= Inae Station =

Railway station in Hikone, Shiga Prefecture, Japan

Inae Station 稲枝駅
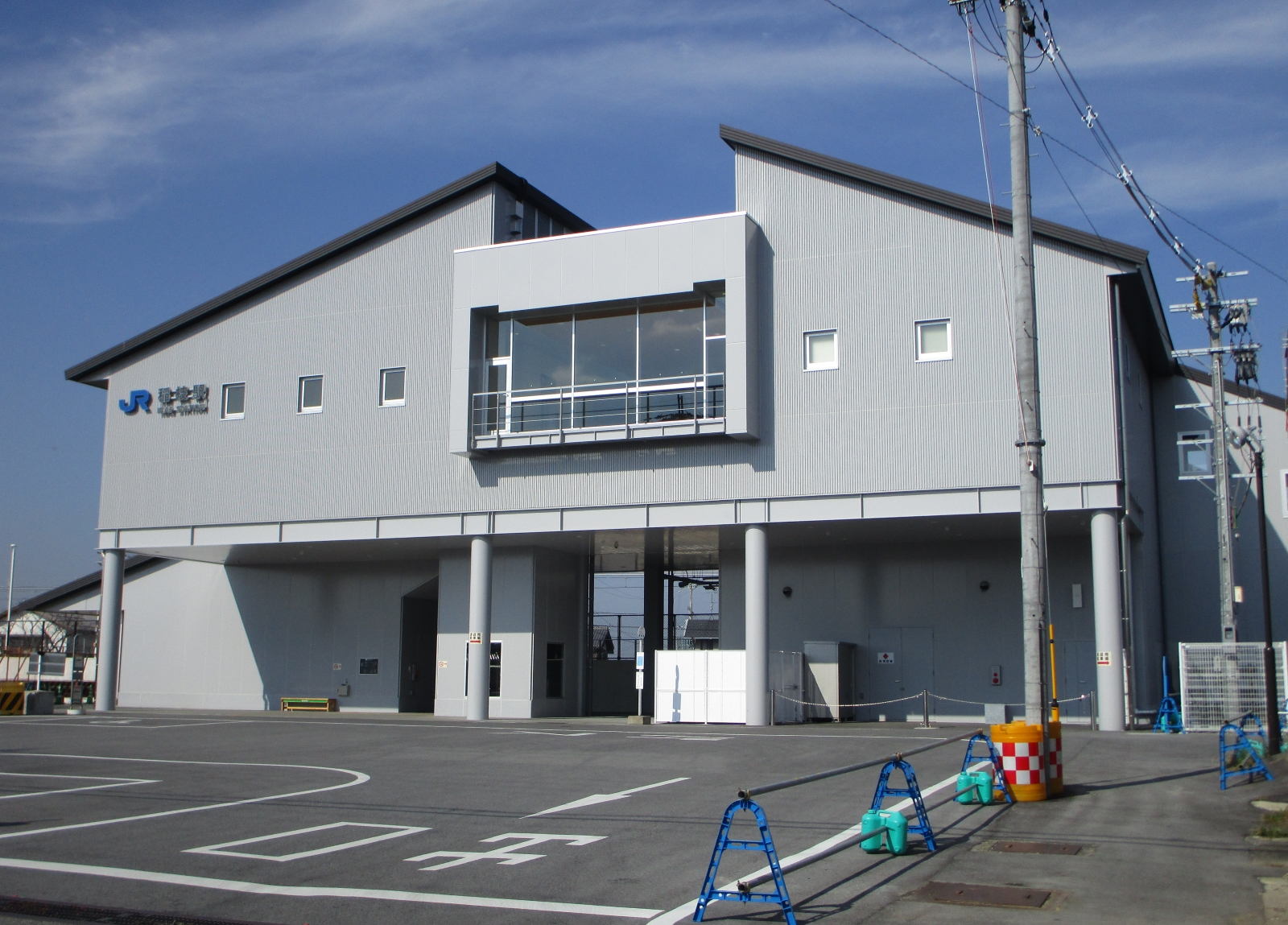
- East gate of the station, November 2017

General information
- Location: 332 Inaecho, Hikone-shi, Shiga-ken 521-1125; Japan
- Coordinates: 35.2033°N 136.1946°E
- System: JR-West regional rail station
- Operator: JR West
- Line: Biwako Line
- Distance: 16.1 km from Maibara
- Platforms: 2 side platforms

Construction
- Structure type: Ground level

Other information
- Station code: JR-A16
- Website: Official website

History
- Opened: 1 July 1920

Passengers
- FY 2023: 4,660 daily
Location
- Location within Shiga Prefecture Location within Japan

Inae Station (稲枝駅, Inae-eki) is a passenger railway station located in the city of Hikone, Shiga, Japan, operated by the West Japan Railway Company (JR West).

== Lines ==
Inae Station is served by the Biwako Line portion of the Tōkaidō Main Line, and is 16.1 kilometers from Maibara and 462.0 kilometers from Tokyo.

== Station layout ==
The station consists of two opposed side platforms connected by an elevated station building. The station building is attended.

== Platform ==
1	■ Biwako Line	for Kusatsu and Kyoto
2	■ Biwako Line	for Maibara, Nagahama and Ōgaki

== Adjacent stations ==
«	Service	»
Biwako Line
Special Rapid: Does not stop at this station
Limited Express "Hida": Does not stop at this station
Kawase	Local	Notogawa

== History ==
The station opened on 1 July 1920 as a station on the Japanese Government Railway (JGR) Tōkaidō Line, which became the Japan National Railways (JNR) after World War II. The station came under the aegis of the West Japan Railway Company (JR West) on 1 April 1987 due to the privatization of JNR. A new station building was completed in 2014.

Station numbering was introduced in March 2018 with Inae being assigned station number JR-A16.

== Passenger statistics ==
In fiscal 2019, the station was used by an average of 2559 passengers daily (boarding passengers only).

== Surrounding area ==
- Seisen University / Seisen College Junior College

== See also ==
- List of railway stations in Japan
