= Azuchi Station =

Railway station in Ōmihachiman, Shiga Prefecture, Japan

Azuchi Station 安土駅
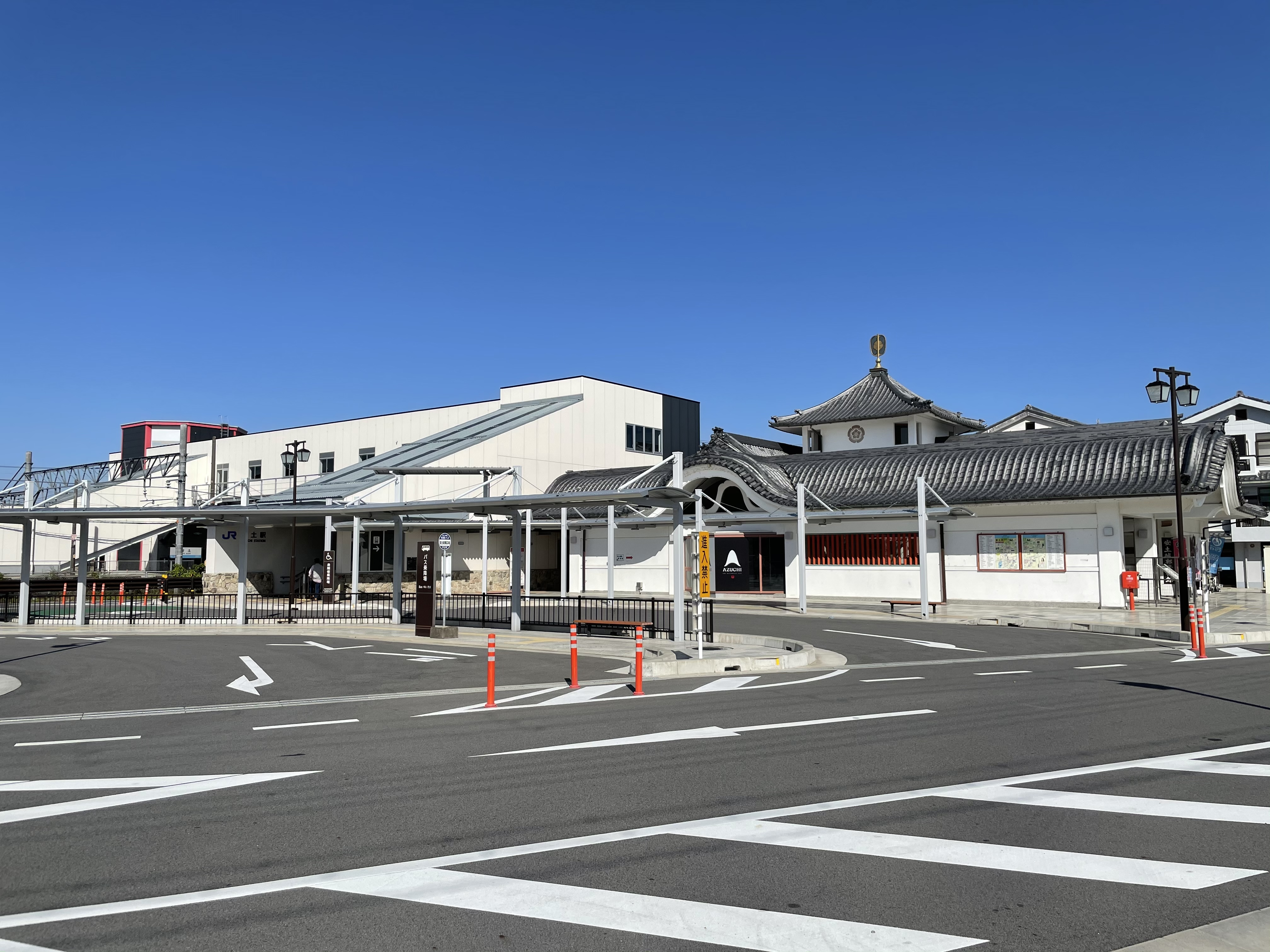
- Azuchi Station south exit, November 2020

General information
- Location: Kamitoyoura, Azuchi-cho, Ōmihachiman-shi, Shiga-ken 521-1341; Japan
- Coordinates: 35.1424°N 136.1337°E
- Operator: JR West
- Line: Biwako Line
- Distance: 24.9 km from Maibara
- Platforms: 1 side + 1 island platform

Construction
- Structure type: Ground level

Other information
- Station code: JR-A18
- Website: Official website

History
- Opened: April 25, 1914

Passengers
- FY 2023: 4,212 daily

Services
Preceding station	JR West	Following station
Ōmi-Hachiman towards Kyoto	Biwako Line Local	Notogawa towards Nagahama
Location
- Location within Shiga Prefecture Location within Japan

Azuchi Station (安土駅, Azuchi-eki) is a passenger railway station located in the city of Ōmihachiman, Shiga Prefecture, Japan, operated by the West Japan Railway Company (JR West).

== Lines ==
Azuchi Station is served by the Biwako Line portion of the Tōkaidō Main Line, and is 24.9 kilometers from Maibara and 470.8 kilometers from Tokyo.

== Station layout ==
The station consists of one side platform and one island platform connected by an elevated station building. The station is staffed.

== Platforms ==
1	■ Biwako Line	for Maibara, Nagahama and Ōgaki
2, 3	■ Biwako Line	for Kusatsu and Kyoto

== History ==
Azuchi Station opened on 25 April 1914 as a station for both passenger and freight operations on the Japanese Government Railway (JGR), which became the Japan National Railway (JNR) after World War II. Freight operations ceased on 15 March 1972. The station became part of the West Japan Railway Company on 1 April 1987 due to the privatization and dissolution of the JNR.

Station numbering was introduced in March 2018 with Azuchi being assigned station number JR-A18.

The station was remodeled to resemble a Japanese castle in 2019.

== Passenger statistics ==
In fiscal 2019, the station was used by an average of 2,586 passengers daily (boarding passengers only).

== Surrounding area ==
- Omihachiman City Azuchi Elementary School
- Azuchi Castle Museum
- Shiga Prefectural Azuchi Castle Archaeological Museum

== See also ==
- List of railway stations in Japan
