= Yasu Station (Shiga) =

Railway station in Yasu, Shiga Prefecture, Japan

Yasu Station 野洲駅
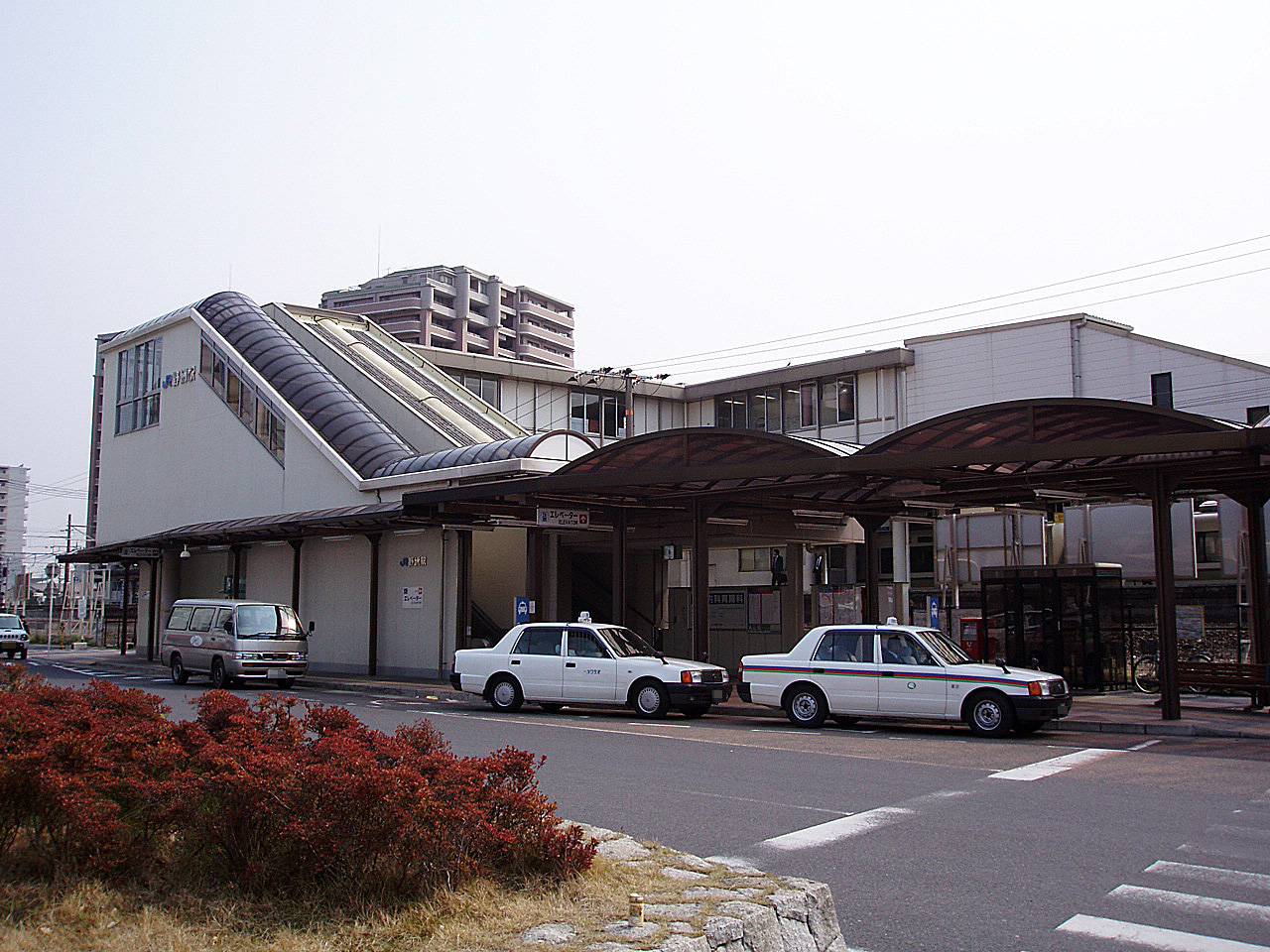
- The north gate of Yasu Station

General information
- Location: Koshinohara, Yasu-shi, Shiga-ken 520-2331; Japan
- Coordinates: 35.068546°N 136.022705°E
- Operator: JR West
- Line: Biwako Line
- Distance: 38.0 km from Maibara
- Platforms: 1 side + 1 island platform
- Tracks: 3

Construction
- Structure type: Ground level
- Accessible: Yes

Other information
- Station code: JR-A21
- Website: Official website

History
- Opened: 16 June 1891

Passengers
- FY 2023: 27,190 daily
Location
- Location within Shiga Prefecture Location within Japan

Yasu Station (野洲駅, Yasu-eki) is a passenger railway station located in the city of Yasu, Shiga Prefecture, Japan, operated by the West Japan Railway Company (JR West).

== Lines ==
Yasu Station is served by the Biwako Line portion of the Tōkaidō Main Line, and is 38.0 kilometers from Maibara and 483.9 kilometers from Tokyo.

== Station layout ==
The station consists of one island platform serving one track (No. 1) and one island platform serving two tracks (Nos. 2 and 3). The ticket windows and gates are located in the building above the platforms. The station has a Midori no Madoguchi staffed ticket office.

== Platforms ==
1	■ Biwako Line	for Kusatsu and Kyoto
2, 3	■ Biwako Line	for Maibara, Nagahama and Tsuruga

== Adjacent Stations ==
«	Service	»
Biwako Line
Limited Express "Hida": Does not stop at this station
Terminus	Limited Express "Haruka"	Moriyama
Terminus	Local (4 doors)	Moriyama
Shinohara	Local (3 doors)	Moriyama
Ōmi-Hachiman	Special Rapid	Moriyama

== History ==
Yasu Station opened on 16 June 1891 as a station for both passenger and freight operations on the Japanese Government Railway (JGR), which became the Japan National Railway (JNR) after World War II. Freight operations ceased on 15 March 1972. A new station building was completed in January 1973. The station became part of the West Japan Railway Company on 1 April 1987 due to the privatization and dissolution of the JNR.

Station numbering was introduced to the station in March 2018 with Yasu being assigned station number JR-A21.

== Passenger statistics ==
In fiscal 2019, the station was used by an average of 15,313 passengers daily (boarding passengers only).

== Surrounding area ==
- Yasu City Hall
- Yasu Hospital
- Shiga Prefectural Yasu High School
- Yasu City Yasu Elementary School

== See also ==
- List of railway stations in Japan
