= Notogawa Station =

Railway station in Higashiōmi, Shiga Prefecture, Japan

Notogawa Station 能登川駅
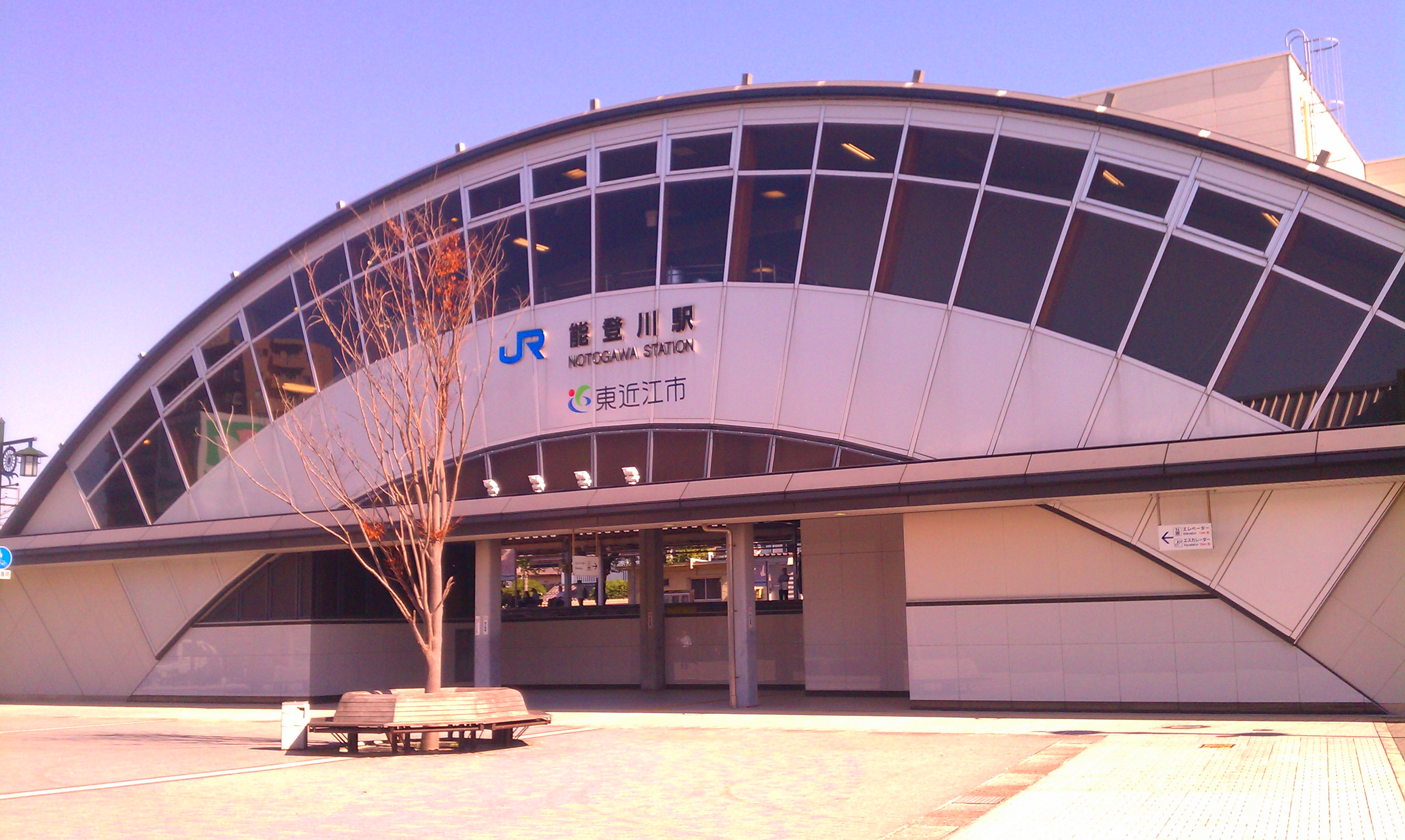
- The west gate of Notogawa Station, September 2020

General information
- Location: Hayashi-chō, Higashiōmi-shi, Shiga-ken 521-1221; Japan
- Coordinates: 35°10′48″N 136°09′57″E
- Operator: JR West
- Line: Biwako Line
- Distance: 19.8 km from Maibara
- Platforms: 1 side + 1 island platform

Construction
- Structure type: Ground level

Other information
- Station code: JR-A17
- Website: Official website

History
- Opened: 1 July 1889

Passengers
- FY 2023: 12,604 daily
Location
- Location within Shiga Prefecture Location within Japan

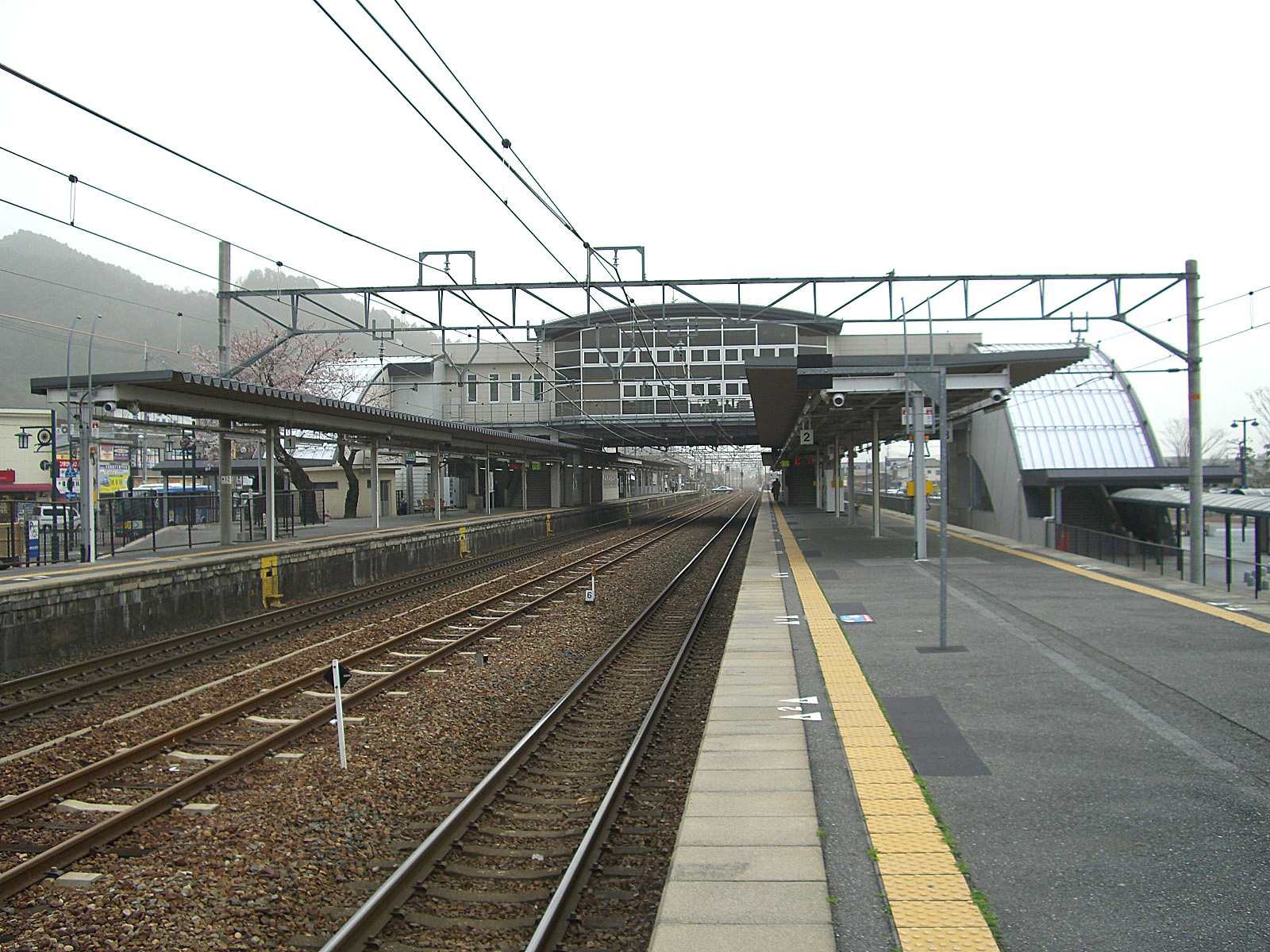
Platforms of Notogawa Station

Notogawa Station (能登川駅, Notogawa-eki) is a passenger railway station located in the city of Higashiōmi, Shiga, Japan, operated by the West Japan Railway Company (JR West).

== Lines ==
Notogawa Station is served by the Biwako Line portion of the Tōkaidō Main Line, and is 19.8 kilometers from Maibara and 465.7 kilometers from Tokyo.

== Station layout ==
The station consists of one side platform and one island platform connected by an elevated station building. The station is staffed.

== Platforms ==
1	■ Biwako Line	for Kusatsu and Kyoto
2, 3	■ Biwako Line	for Maibara, Nagahama and Ōgaki

== Adjacent stations ==
«	Service	»
Biwako Line
Limited Express "Hida": Does not stop at this station
Hikone	Special Rapid	Ōmi-Hachiman
Inae	Local	Azuchi

== History ==
The station opened on 1 July 1889, when the railway between Sekigahara and Baba (now Zeze) opened.

Station numbering was introduced in March 2018 with Notogawa being assigned station number JR-A17.

== Passenger statistics ==
In fiscal 2019, the station was used by an average of 7201 passengers daily (boarding passengers only).

== Surrounding area ==
- Higashiomi City Hall Notogawa Branch (formerly Notogawa Town Hall)
- Higashiomi City Notogawa Library
- Higashiomi City Notogawa Museum
- Notogawa Sports Center
- Hayashi Central Park
- Higashiomi City Notogawa Junior High School

== See also ==
- List of railway stations in Japan
