= Shinohara Station (Shiga) =

Railway station in Ōmihachiman, Shiga Prefecture, Japan

Shinohara Station 篠原駅
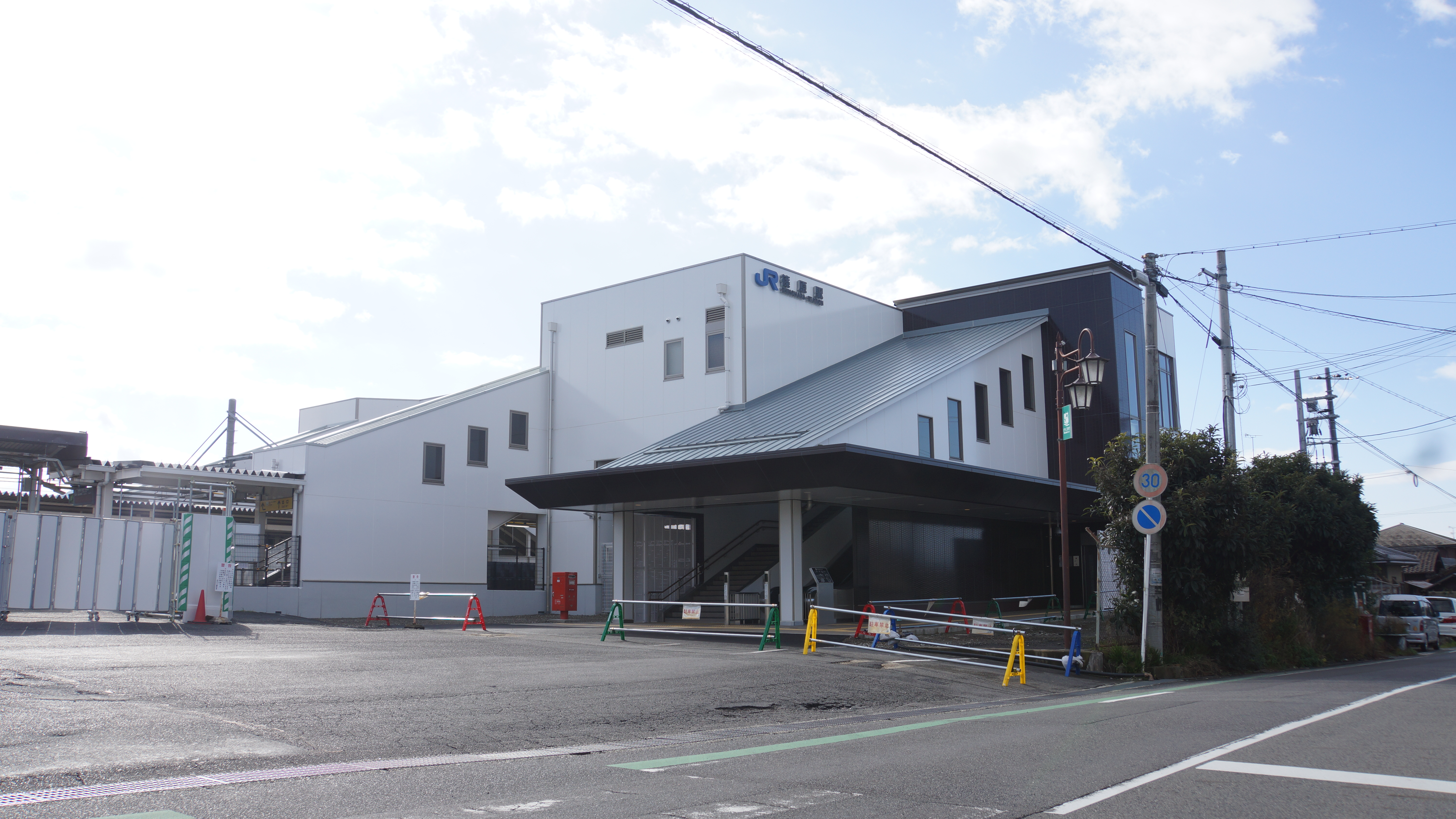
- The north entrance in January 2016

General information
- Location: 1260 Ueno-cho, Ōmihachiman-shi, Shiga-ken 523-0046; Japan
- Coordinates: 35°05′57″N 136°04′17″E
- Operator: JR West
- Line: Biwako Line
- Distance: 32.4 km from Maibara
- Platforms: 2 side platforms

Other information
- Station code: JR-A20
- Website: Official website

History
- Opened: April 20, 1921

Passengers
- FY 2023: 3,966 daily

Services
Preceding station	JR West	Following station
Yasu towards Kyoto	Biwako Line Local	Ōmi-Hachiman towards Nagahama
Location
- Location within Shiga Prefecture Location within Japan

Shinohara Station (篠原駅, Shinohara-eki) is a passenger railway station located in the city of Ōmihachiman, Shiga Prefecture, Japan, operated by the West Japan Railway Company (JR West).

== Lines ==
Shinohara Station is served by the Biwako Line portion of the Tōkaidō Main Line, and is 32.4 kilometers from Maibara and 478.3 kilometers from Tokyo.

== Station layout ==
The station consists of two opposed side platforms connected by an elevated concourse. The station is staffed.

== Platforms ==
1	■ Biwako Line	for Maibara, Nagahama and Ōgaki
2, 3	■ Biwako Line	for Kusatsu and Kyoto

== History ==
Shinohara station opened on 20 April 1921, replacing a signal yard that had been in operation since 1 June 1918. The station became part of the West Japan Railway Company on 1 April 1987 due to the privatization and dissolution of the JNR.

Station numbering was introduced to the station in March 2018 with Shinohara being assigned station number JR-A20.

== Passenger statistics ==
In fiscal 2019, the station was used by an average of 2,179 passengers daily (boarding passengers only).

== Surrounding area ==
- Polytech College Shiga
- Shinohara Park

== See also ==
- List of railway stations in Japan
