= Moriyama Station (Shiga) =

Railway station in Moriyama, Shiga Prefecture, Japan

Moriyama Station 守山駅
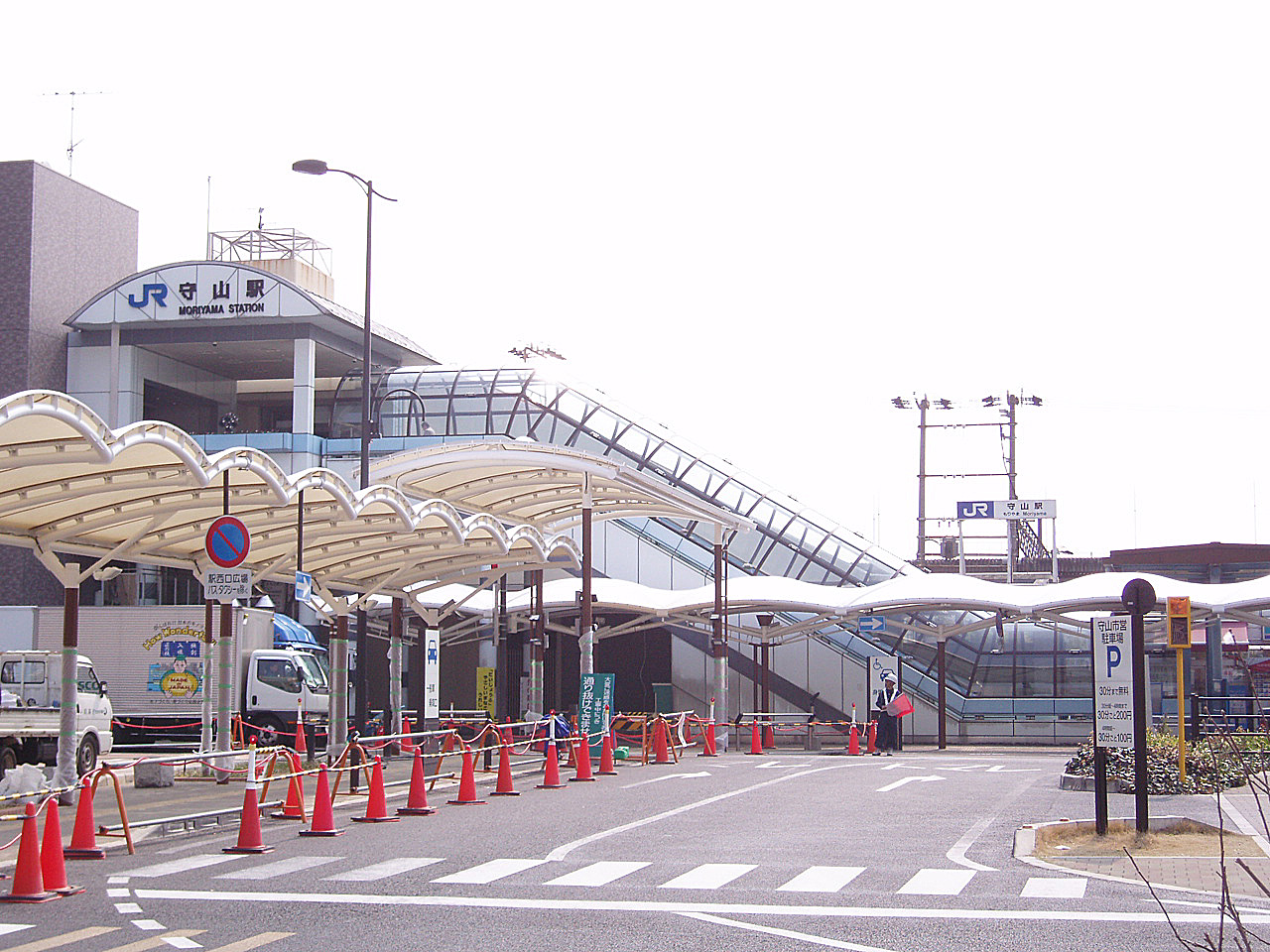
- North side of the station

General information
- Location: 6-1 Katsube, Moriyama-shi, Shiga-ken 524-0041; Japan
- Coordinates: 35.050411°N 135.99569°E
- Operator: JR West
- Line: Biwako Line
- Distance: 41.1 km from Maibara
- Platforms: 2 side platforms

Construction
- Structure type: Ground level

Other information
- Station code: JR-A22
- Website: Official website

History
- Opened: 16 April 1912

Passengers
- FY 2023: 33,714 daily
Location
- Location within Shiga Prefecture Location within Japan

Moriyama Station (守山駅, Moriyama-eki) is a passenger railway station located in the city of Moriyama, Shiga Prefecture, Japan, operated by the West Japan Railway Company (JR West).

== Lines ==
Moriyama Station is served by the Biwako Line portion of the Tōkaidō Main Line, and is 41.1 kilometers from Maibara and 487.0 kilometers from Tokyo.

== Station layout ==
The station consists of two opposed side platforms connected by an elevated station building. The station has a Midori no Madoguchi staffed ticket office.

== Platforms ==
1	■ Biwako Line	for Maibara, Nagahama and Ōgaki
2	■ Biwako Line	for Kusatsu and Kyoto

== Adjacent Stations ==
«	Service	»
Biwako Line
Limited Express "Hida": Does not stop at this station
Yasu	Limited Express "Haruka"	Kusatsu
Yasu	Special Rapid Service	Kusatsu
Yasu	Local	Rittō

== History ==
The station opened on 16 April 1912 as a station for both passenger and freight operations on the Japanese Government Railway (JGR), which became the Japan National Railway (JNR) after World War II. The station was bombed by American aircraft on 30 July 1945, killing 11 people. The current station building was completed in 1973. The station became part of the West Japan Railway Company on 1 April 1987 due to the privatization and dissolution of the JNR.

Station numbering was introduced to the station in March 2018 with Moriyama being assigned station number JR-A22.

== Passenger statistics ==
In fiscal 2019, the station was used by an average of 17,283 passengers daily (boarding passengers only).

According to the "Shiga Prefecture Statistical Book", the average daily ridership is as follows

Year	Daily average Number of passengers	Source
1992	14,574	
1993	14,576	
1994	14,293	
1995	14,468	
1996	14,514	
1997	14,228	
1998	14,016	
1999	13,739	
2000	13,686	
2001	13,562	
2002	13,585	
2003	13,522	
2004	13,412	
2005	13,347	
2006	13,909	
2007	14,511	
2008	15,086	
2009	15,065	
2010	15,153	
2011	15,340	
2012	15,645	
2013	16,110	
2014	16,022	
2015	16,382	
2016	16,490	
2017	16,786	
2018	17,087	
2019	17,283	
2020	14,248	

== Surrounding area ==
- Moriyama City Hall
- Shiga Prefectural General Hospital
- Shiga Medical Center for Children
- Moriyama Municipal Hospital
- Moriyama City Irigaoka Elementary School

== See also ==
- List of railway stations in Japan
