= Rittō Station =

Railway station in Rittō, Shiga Prefecture, Japan

Rittō Station 栗東駅
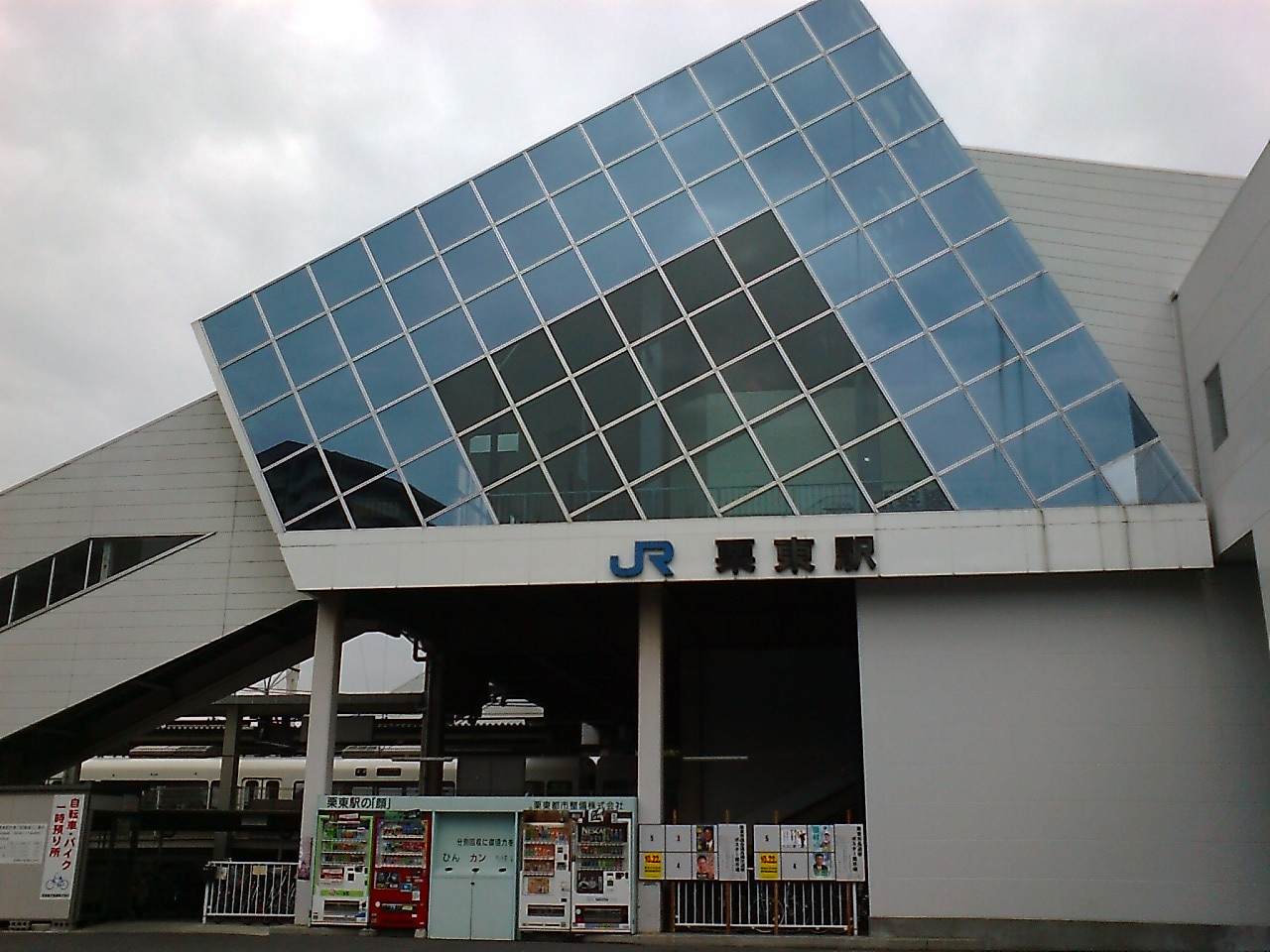
- Rittō Station building, October 2006

General information
- Location: 2-3 Heso, Rittō-shi, Shiga-ken 520-3031; Japan
- Coordinates: 35.0374°N 135.9800°E
- Operator: JR West
- Line: Biwako Line
- Distance: 43.2 km from Maibara
- Platforms: 2 side platforms
- Tracks: 2

Other information
- Station code: JR-A23
- Website: Official website

History
- Opened: 16 March 1991

Passengers
- FY 2023: 18,148 daily

Services
Preceding station	JR West	Following station
Kusatsu towards Kyoto	Biwako Line Local	Moriyama towards Nagahama
Location
- Location within Shiga Prefecture Location within Japan

Rittō Station (栗東駅, Rittō-eki) is a passenger railway station located in the city of Rittō, Shiga Prefecture, Japan, operated by the West Japan Railway Company (JR West).

== Lines ==
Rittō Station is served by the Biwako Line portion of the Tōkaidō Main Line, and is 43.2 km (26.8 mi) from Maibara and 489.1 km (303.9 mi) from Tokyo.

== Station layout ==
The station consists of two opposed side platforms connected by an elevated concourse. The station is staffed.

== Platforms ==
1	■ Biwako Line	for Maibara, Nagahama and Ōgaki
2	■ Biwako Line	for Kusatsu and Kyoto

== History ==
Rittō Station was opened on 16 March 1991.

Station numbering was introduced to the station in March 2018 with Rittō being assigned station number JR-A23.

== Passenger statistics ==
In fiscal 2019, the station was used by an average of 11,976 passengers daily (boarding passengers only).

== Surrounding area ==
- Daiho Shrine
- Ritto City Daiho Elementary School
- Ritto Arts and Culture Center Sakira
- Sekisui Chemical Shiga Ritto Factory

== See also ==
- List of railway stations in Japan
