= Tamura Station =

Railway station in Nagahama, Shiga Prefecture, Japan

Tamura Station 田村駅
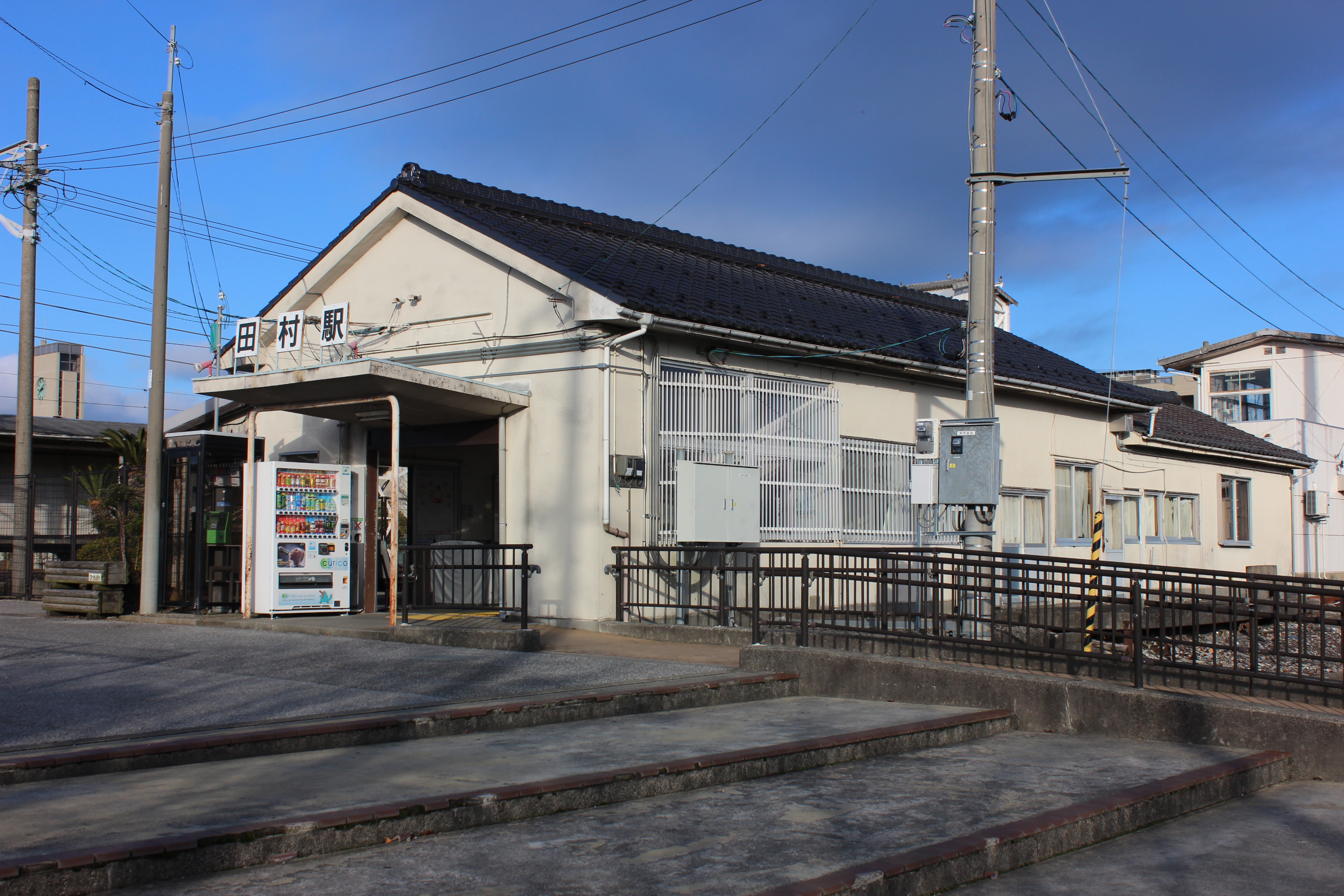
- Tamura Station, November 2020

General information
- Location: 1210 Minami-Sendo Tamura-cho, Nagahama-shi, Shiga-ken 526-0829; Japan
- Coordinates: 35°21′22.71″N 136°16′54.53″E
- System: JR-West regional rail station
- Operator: JR West
- Line: Biwako Line
- Distance: 4.7 km from Maibara
- Platforms: 2 side platforms

Construction
- Structure type: Ground level

Other information
- Station code: JR-A10
- Website: Official website

History
- Opened: 14 October 1931
- Closed: 1940-1954

Passengers
- FY 2023: 2,236 daily
Location
- Location within Shiga Prefecture Location within Japan

Tamura Station (田村駅, Tamura-eki) is a passenger railway station located in the city of Nagahama, Shiga, Japan, operated by the West Japan Railway Company (JR West).

== Lines ==
Tamura Station is served by the Biwako Line portion of the Hokuriku Main Line, and is 4.7 kilometers from the terminus of the line at Maibara.

== Station layout ==
The station consists of two opposed unnumbered side platforms connected by a footbridge. The station is unattended.

== Platform ==
east	■ Biwako Line	for Maibara and Kyoto
west	■ Biwako Line	for Nagahama, Tsuruga

== Adjacent stations ==
«	Service	»
Biwako Line
Special Rapid: Does not stop at this station
Limited Express "Hida": Does not stop at this station
Sakata	Local	Nagahama

== History ==
The station opened on 14 October 1931 on the Japanese Government Railway (JGR) Hokuriku Main Line. The station was closed on 1 November 1940 and reopened as "Sakata Station" on 10 December 1954 under the Japan National Railways (JNR) after World War II. The station came under the aegis of the West Japan Railway Company (JR West) on 1 April 1987 due to the privatization of JNR.

Station numbering was introduced in March 2018 with Tamura being assigned station number JR-A10.

== Passenger statistics ==
In fiscal 2019, the station was used by an average of 1270 passengers daily (boarding passengers only).

== Surrounding area ==
- Nagahama Institute of Bio-Science and Technology
- Shiga Prefectural Nagahama Dome
- Nagahama Science Park
- Shiga Prefectural Nagahama Agricultural High School
- Shiga Bunkyo Junior College
- Nagahama Municipal Hospital

== See also ==
- List of railway stations in Japan
