= Ōtsu Station =

Railway station in Ōtsu, Shiga Prefecture, Japan

Ōtsu Station 大津駅
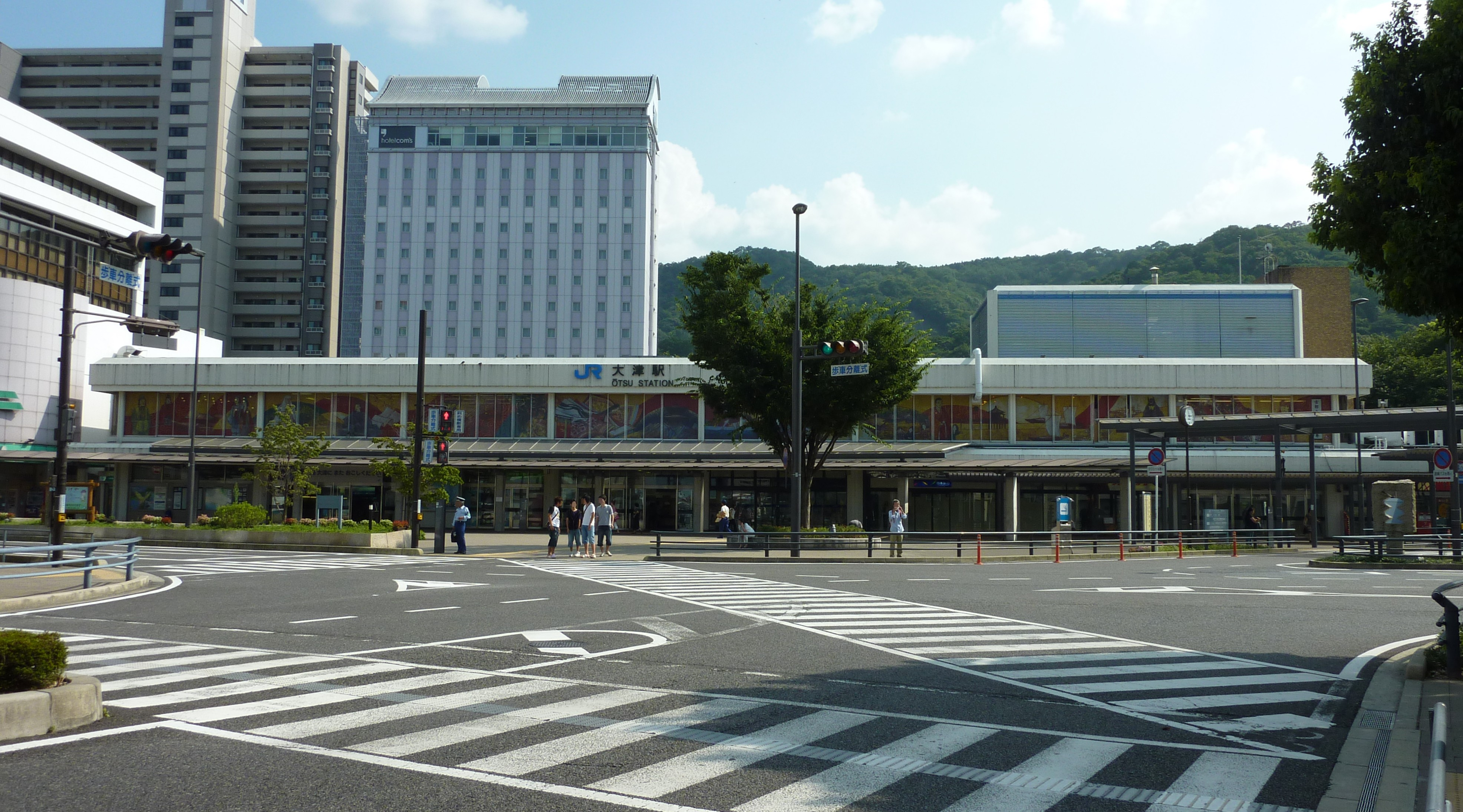
- North side of Ōtsu Station, August 2010

General information
- Location: 1 Kasugachō, Ōtsu-shi, Shiga-ken 520-0055; Japan 35.0030°N 135.8649°E
- Operator: JR West
- Line: Biwako Line
- Distance: 57.7 km from Maibara
- Platforms: 2 island platforms

Construction
- Structure type: Ground level
- Accessible: Yes

Other information
- Station code: JR-A29

History
- Opened: 15 July 1880

Passengers
- FY 2023: 33,164 daily
Location
- Location within Shiga Prefecture Location within Japan

Ōtsu Station (大津駅, Ōtsu-eki) is a passenger railway station located in the city of Ōtsu, Shiga Prefecture, Japan, operated by the West Japan Railway Company (JR West).

== Lines ==
Ōtsu Station is served by the Biwako Line portion of the Tōkaidō Main Line, and is 57.7 kilometers from Maibara and 503.6 kilometers from Tokyo.

== Station layout ==
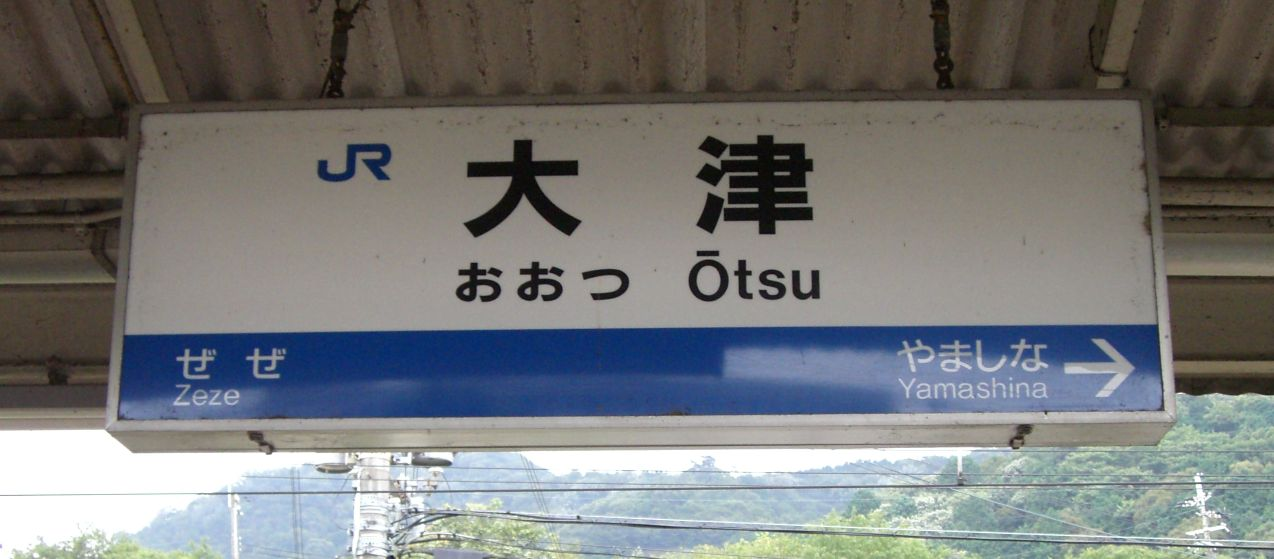
Sign on platform, August 2006

The station is a ground-level station with two island platforms and four tracks. There are two gates on the south and north; the latter is named Biwako Entrance. Each platform is connected with an underpass to the gates by two stairs and an elevator. The station has a Midori no Madoguchi staffed ticket office.

=== Platforms ===
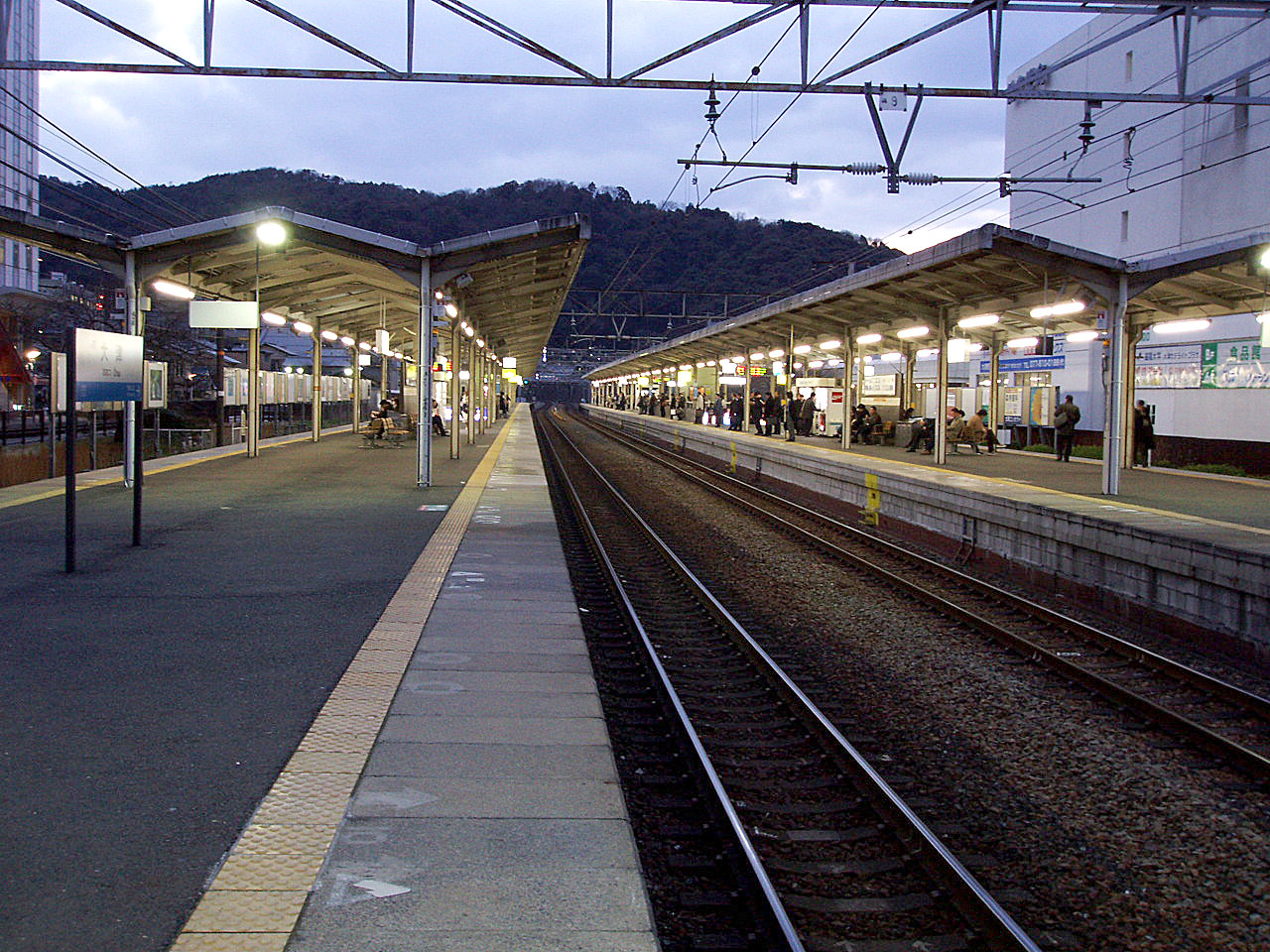
Platforms and tracks, March 2007

1	■ Biwako Line (Outer track, eastbound)	Special rapid service for Kusatsu and Maibara limited express Haruka, Biwako Express for Kusatsu and Maibara local trains for Kusatsu and Kibukawa (Kusatsu Line)
2	■ Biwako Line (Inner track, eastbound)	local trains and special rapid service for Kusatsu and Maibara
3	■ Biwako Line (Inner track, westbound)	local trains and special rapid service for Kyoto and Osaka
4	■ Biwako Line (Outer track, westbound)	Trains for Kyoto and Osaka limited express Biwako Express for Kyoto and Osaka; Haruka for Kansai Airport

The station is situated on the middle of a four-track section. Some Special Rapid Service trains and some Kusatsu Line direct service train in the morning and evening use the outer two tracks (Nos. 1 and 4 for each direction) and other trains use the inner tracks (Nos. 2 and 3).

== Adjacent stations ==
«	Service	»
Tokaido Main Line (Biwako Line)
Limited Express "Hida": Does not stop at this station
Ishiyama	Limited Express "Haruka"	Yamashina or Kyoto
Ishiyama	Special Rapid Service	Yamashina
Zeze	Local	Yamashina

== History ==
The current station complex was built in 1921 when a new route was introduced to the section between Kyoto Station and Zeze Station.

=== First station ===
The first Ōtsu Station was built on July 15, 1880, the site of which is now occupied by Hama-Ōtsu Station of Keihan Electric Railway. Trains from Kobe, Osaka and Kyoto switchedback at Baba Station (present-day Zeze Station) to overcome an elevation difference and entered into Ōtsu Station, the terminal adjacent to a port of the Lake Biwa. The railway with the port station provided joint service with boats on the lake which enabled the transport of passengers and freight between the new capital, Tokyo, and the old capital, Kyoto, despite incompleteness of the railway in the Shiga Prefecture area. This is the first example of the train-boat joint service in Japan. The boats left each port, Ōtsu and Nagahama, 3 times a day and took about 3 hours to cross the lake.

=== Second station ===
The boat was, however, not a reliable mean of transportation in comparison with the railway. When the new railway between Baba Station and Sekigahara Station was completed in 1889 so that trains became able to run from Tokyo to Kobe directly, the boat service was discontinued. At this time the railway branch between Baba Station and Ōtsu Station ceased passenger service but was continued as a freight-only line. Later in 1898 passenger service was revived on the branch, which in 1909 was named the Ōtsu Line. In March 1913 Ōtsu Densha Kidō tramway started operation using a part of the track of the Ōtsu Line and the passenger service on the line was again discontinued. In June 1913, Baba Station was renamed Ōtsu Station and the first Ōtsu Station was renamed Hama-Ōtsu Station.

=== Third (present) station ===
When the new route through Shin-Ōsakayama Tunnel was built between the second Ōtsu Station and Kyoto Station on August 1, 1921, the third and current Ōtsu Station was built on the new route and the name of the second station was moved back to Baba Station.

Station numbering was introduced to the station in March 2018 with Ōtsu being assigned station number JR-A29.

== Passenger statistics ==
In fiscal 2019, the station was used by an average of 17,358 passengers (boarding passengers only), making it the 26th-busiest station by traffic in the West Japan Railway Company's network.

== Surrounding area ==
- Shiga Prefectural Office
- Otsu District Court / Otsu Family Court
- Otsu City Osaka Elementary School
- Otsu City Chuo Elementary School

== See also ==
- List of railway stations in Japan
