= Seta Station (Shiga) =

Railway station in Ōtsu, Shiga Prefecture, Japan

Seta Station 瀬田駅
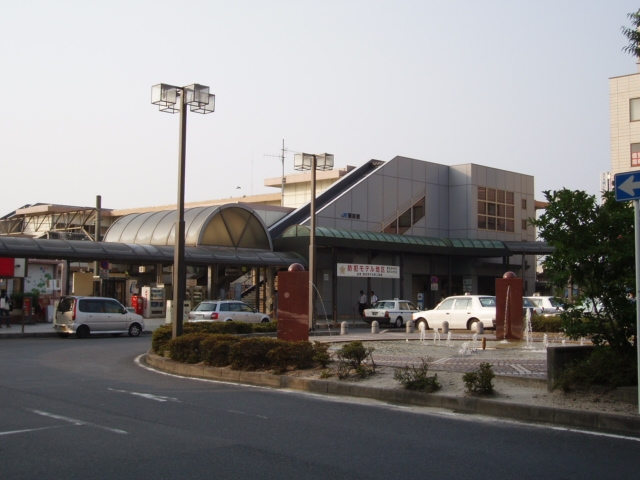
- Seta Station, July 2005

General information
- Location: 1-10 Ōgaya, Ōtsu-shi, Shiga-ken 520-2144; Japan
- Coordinates: 34°59′13″N 135°55′31″E
- Operator: JR West
- Line: Biwako Line
- Distance: 50.7 km from Maibara
- Platforms: 2 island platforms

Construction
- Structure type: Ground level
- Accessible: Yes

Other information
- Station code: JR-A26

History
- Opened: 12 August 1969

Passengers
- FY 2023: 34,294 daily

Services
| Preceding station | JR West | Following station |
|---|---|---|
| Ishiyama towards Kyoto | Biwako Line Local | Minami-Kusatsu towards Nagahama |
Location
- Location within Shiga Prefecture Location within Japan

Seta Station (瀬田駅, Seta-eki) is a passenger railway station located in the city of Ōtsu, Shiga Prefecture, Japan, operated by the West Japan Railway Company (JR West).

== Lines ==
Seta Station is served by the Biwako Line portion of the Tōkaidō Main Line, and is 50.7 kilometers from Maibara and 496.6 kilometers from Tokyo.

== Station layout ==
The station consists of two island platforms connected by an elevated station building. The station is staffed.

== Platforms ==
| 1 | ■ Biwako Line | for Kyoto and Osaka (partly) |
| 2 | ■ Biwako Line | for Kyoto and Osaka |
| 3 | ■ Biwako Line | for Kusatsu and Maibara |
| 4 | ■ Biwako Line | for Kusatsu and Maibara (partly) (Kusatsu Line) for Kusatsu and Kibukawa |

== History ==
The route of the Tōkaidō Main Line passed through Seto in 1889, but no station was built in the village. The Ministry of Communications authorized a station to be built in 1900, but despite petitions by local inhabitants, Ishiyama Station was built instead. After half a century, the route of the Tōkaidō Shinkansen was designed to pass through Seta and in 1960 the government asked local residents to permit a land survey and began steps to secure the required land. However, the local residents refused cooperation unless a station was built as per the 1900 authorization. Seta Station opened on 12 August 1969.

Station numbering was introduced to the station in March 2018 with Seta being assigned station number JR-A26.

== Passenger statistics ==
In fiscal 2019, the station was used by an average of 18,224 passengers (boarding passengers only) in 2019, making it the 26th-busiest station by traffic in the West Japan Railway Company's network.

== Surrounding area ==
- Otsu Municipal Seta Kita Junior High School
- Kayano Shrine
- Otsu City Setakita Elementary School

== See also ==
- List of railway stations in Japan
