= Ishiyama Station =

Railway station in Ōtsu, Shiga Prefecture, Japan

Ishiyama Station 石山駅
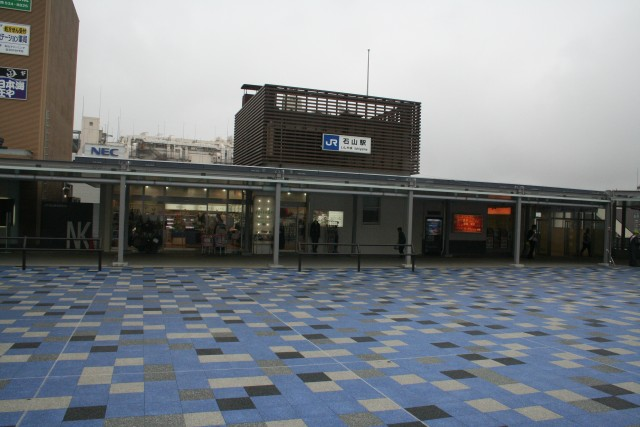
- Ishiyama Station, October 2006

General information
- Location: Awazu-cho, Ōtsu-shi, Shiga-ken 520-0832; Japan
- Coordinates: 34°58′48″N 135°54′01″E
- Operator: JR West
- Line: Biwako Line
- Distance: 53.2 km from Maibara
- Platforms: 2 island platforms

Construction
- Structure type: Ground level
- Accessible: Yes

Other information
- Station code: JR-A27

History
- Opened: 1 April 1903

Passengers
- FY 2023: 41,368 daily
Location
- Location within Shiga Prefecture Location within Japan

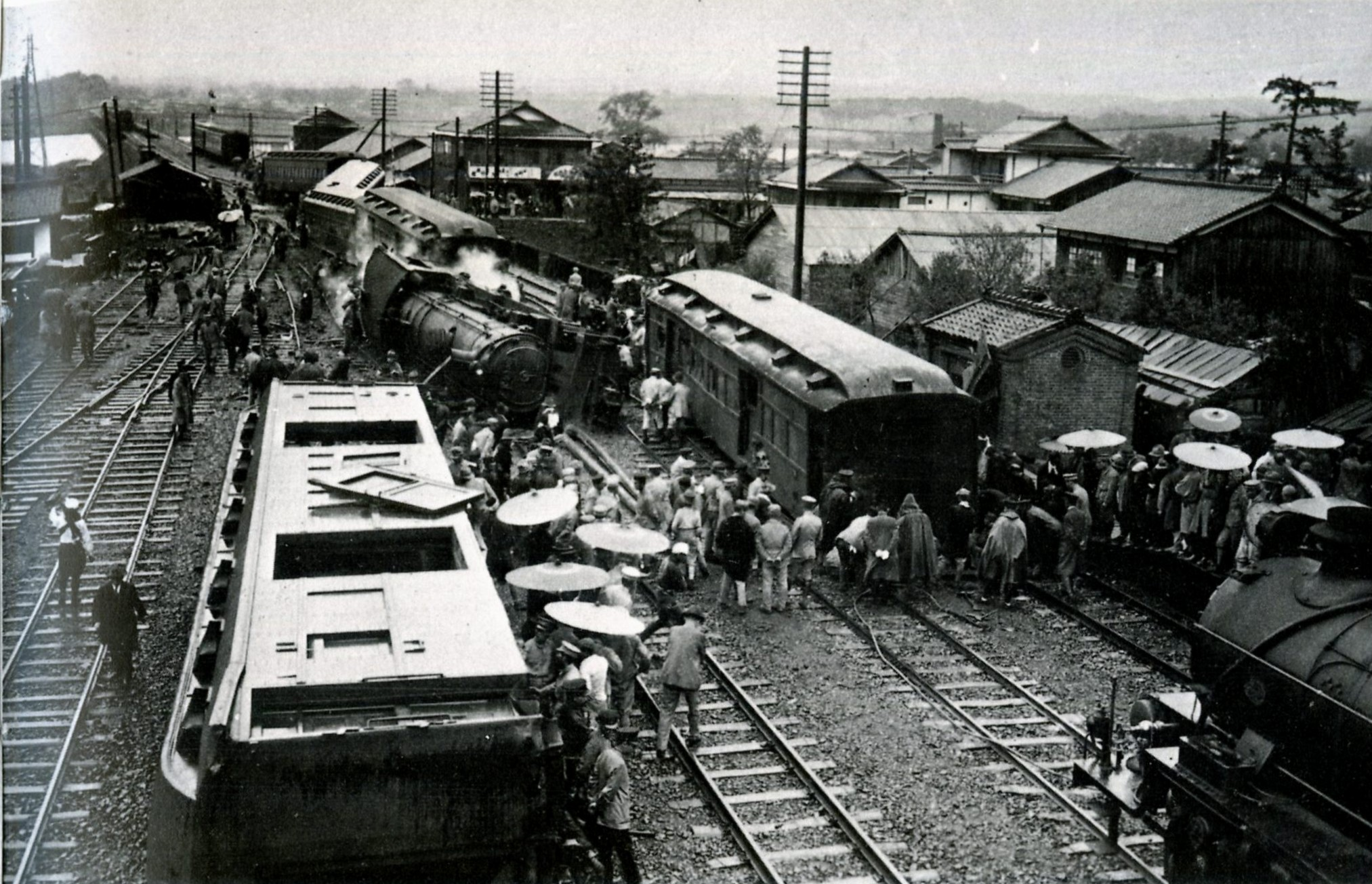
Ishiyama Station accident, 1930

Ishiyama Station (石山駅, Ishiyama-eki) is a passenger railway station located in the city of Ōtsu, Shiga Prefecture, Japan, operated by the West Japan Railway Company (JR West). It is also a freight deport for the Japan Freight Railway Company (JR Freight). The station is located adjacent to the Keihan Electric Railway Keihan-ishiyama Station with which it is connected by a concourse.

== Lines ==
Ishiyama Station is served by the Biwako Line portion of the Tōkaidō Main Line, and is 53.2 kilometers from Maibara and 499.1 kilometers from Tokyo.

== Station layout ==
The station consists of two island platforms with 4 tracks on the ground and 2 siding tracks on both sides of the outer tracks. The station has a Midori no Madoguchi staffed ticket office.

=== Platforms ===
| 1 | ■ Biwako Line | part of local trains and special rapid service for Kyoto, Takatsuki and Osaka |
| 1 | ■ limited express trains | for Shin-Osaka, Tennoji and Kansai Airport |
| 2 | ■ Biwako Line | local trains and special rapid service for Kyoto, Takatsuki and Osaka |
| 3 | ■ Biwako Line | local trains and special rapid service for Kusatsu, Maibara and Nagahama |
| 4 | ■ Biwako Line | special rapid service (part of trains) and limited express trains for Kusatsu, Maibara and Nagahama |
| 4 | ■ through to the Kusatsu Line | local trains for Kusatsu, Kibukawa and Tsuge |

== Adjacent stations ==
| « | Service | » |
West Japan Railway Company Biwako Line (Ishiyama)
Limited Express "Hida": Does not stop at this station
| Kusatsu | Limited Express "Haruka" | Otsu |
| Minami-Kusatsu | Special Rapid | Ōtsu |
| Seta | Local (including Rapid Service) | Zeze |

== History ==
The route of the Tōkaidō Main Line passed through Ishiyama in 1889, but no station was built until 1 April 1903. On 25 April 1930 a derailment accident occurred at the station when an express train from Tokyo en route to Shimonoseki overturned when passing a point at high speed. Thirteen people were injured, but there were no fatalities. The station became part of the JR West network on 1 April 1987 with the privation of the Japan National Railway (JNR).

Station numbering was introduced to the station in March 2018 with Ishiyama being assigned station number JR-A27.

== Passenger statistics ==
In fiscal 2019, the station was used by an average of 24,103 passengers (boarding passengers only) in 2019, making it the 26th-busiest station by traffic in the West Japan Railway Company's network.

== Surrounding area ==
- Renesas Semiconductor Manufacturing Shiga Factory (formerly Renesas Kansai Semiconductor)
- Nippon Electric Glass Headquarters / Otsu Office
- NSK Otsu Factory

== See also ==
- List of railway stations in Japan
