= Minami-Kusatsu Station =

Railway station in Kusatsu, Shiga Prefecture, Japan

Minami-Kusatsu Station 南草津駅
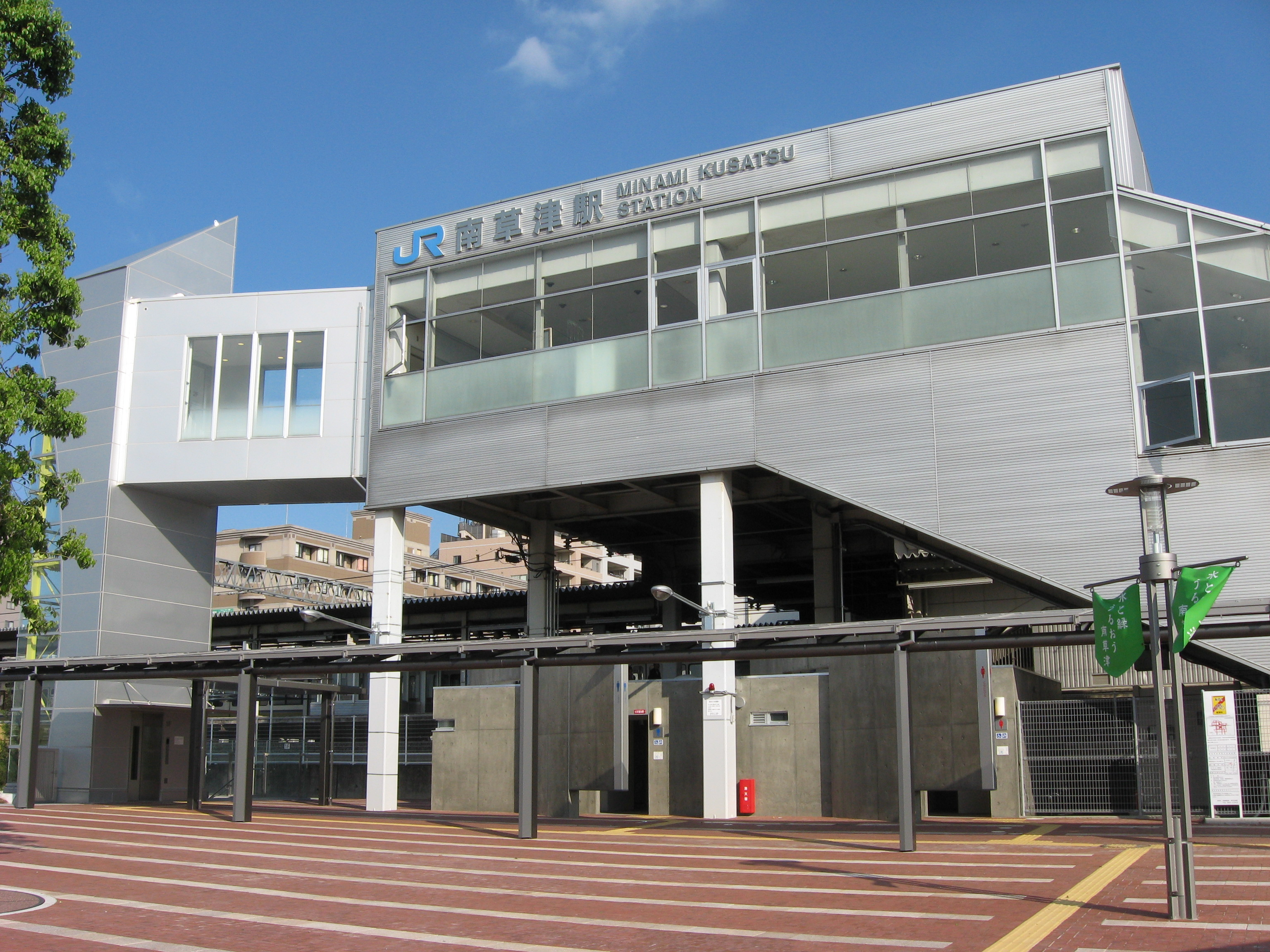
- Minami-Kusatsu Station west gate, September 2007

General information
- Other names: Minakusa
- Location: 1-14-1, Noji, Kusatsu-shi, Shiga-ken 525-0050; Japan
- Coordinates: 35°0′13.5″N 135°56′50.21″E
- Operator: JR West
- Line: Biwako Line
- Distance: 48.0 km from Maibara
- Platforms: 2 island platforms

Construction
- Structure type: Ground level

Other information
- Station code: JR-A25

History
- Opened: 4 September 1994

Passengers
- FY 2023: 53,720 daily
Location
- Location within Shiga Prefecture Location within Japan

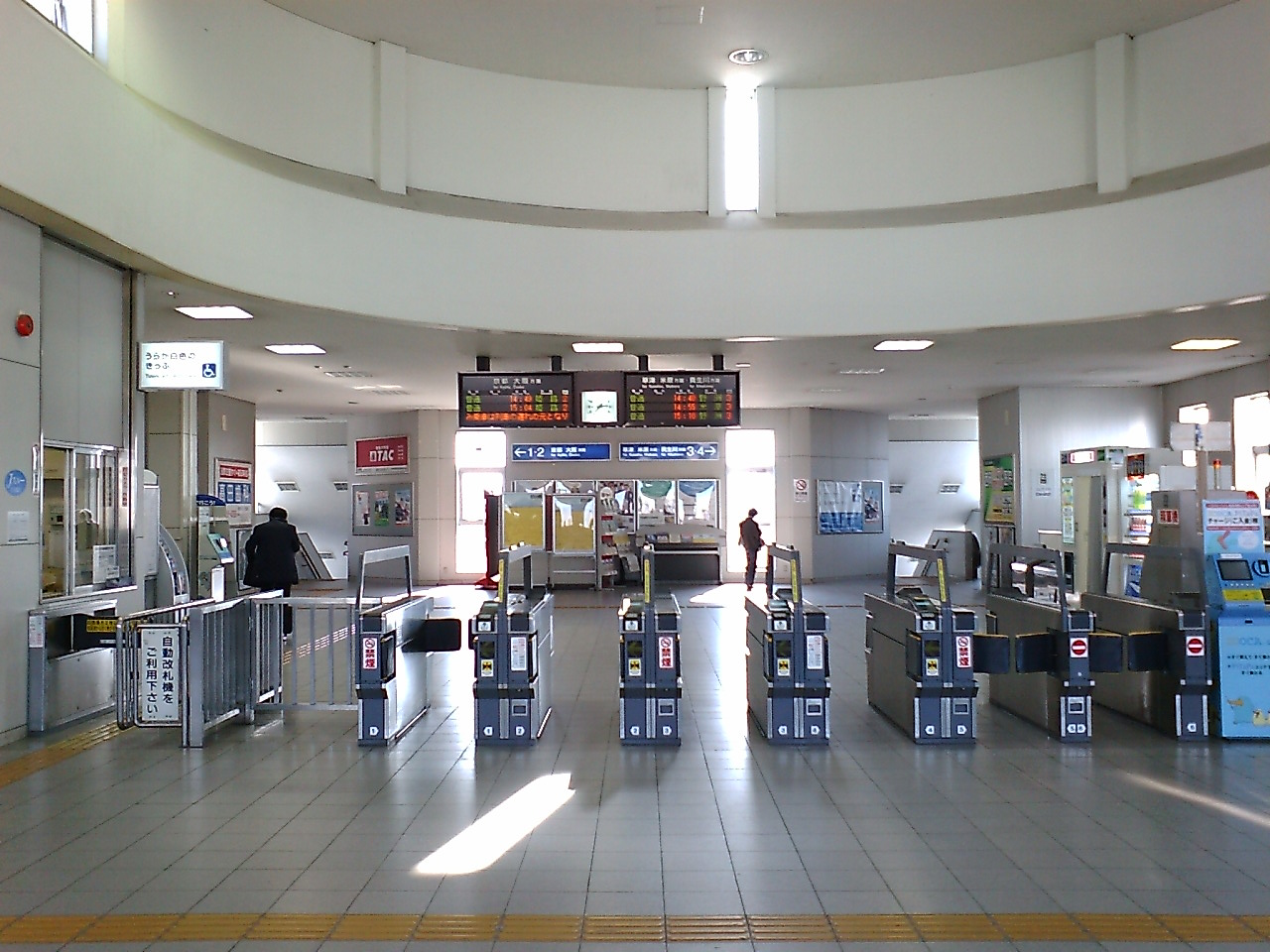
Minami-Kusatsu Station ticket gates, February 2007

Minami-Kusatsu Station (南草津駅, Minami-Kusatsu-eki) is a passenger railway station located in the city of Kusatsu, Shiga Prefecture, Japan, operated by the West Japan Railway Company (JR West). It is sometimes popularly referred to simply as "Minakusa"

== Lines ==
Minami-Kusatsu Station is served by the Biwako Line portion of the Tōkaidō Main Line, and is 48.0 kilometers from Maibara and 493.9 kilometers from Tokyo.

== Station layout ==
The station consists of two island platforms connected by an elevated station building. The station has a Midori no Madoguchi staffed ticket office.

== Platforms ==
1	■ Biwako Line	for Kyoto and Osaka (partly)
2	■ Biwako Line	for Kyoto and Osaka
3	■ Biwako Line	for Kusatsu and Maibara
4	■ Biwako Line	for Kusatsu and Maibara (partly) (Kusatsu Line) for Kusatsu and Kibukawa

== Adjacent stations ==
«	Service	»
Biwako Line
Limited Express "Hida": Does not stop at this station
Kansai Airport Limited Express "Haruka": Does not stop at this station
Kusatsu	Local	Seta
Kusatsu	Special Rapid	Ishiyama

== History ==
The station opened on 4 September 1994, following a successful petition for its construction by Kusatsu. The city contributed about ¥3 billion of the total ¥30 billion costs of construction. The station has stimulated urban growth in the surrounding area, especially after the opening of Ritsumeikan University's Biwako-Kusatsu Campus (BKC) in 1994.

Station numbering was introduced to the station in March 2018 with Minami-Kusatsu being assigned station number JR-A25.

== Passenger statistics ==
In fiscal 2019, the station was used by an average of 30,443 passengers (boarding passengers only) in 2019, making it the 26th-busiest station by traffic in the West Japan Railway Company's network.

== Surrounding area ==
- Kusatsu General Hospital
- Kusatsu Municipal Senior High School
- Omi Kusatsu Tokushukai Hospital
- Ritsumeikan University Biwako Kusatsu Campus
- Shiga University of Medical Science
- Shiga Prefectural Tamagawa High School

== See also ==
- List of railway stations in Japan
