= Sakata Station =

Sakata Station is the name of multiple train stations in Japan:

- Sakata Station (Shiga) - (坂田駅) in Shiga Prefecture
- Sakata Station (Yamagata) - (酒田駅) in Yamagata Prefecture
