= Biwako Line =

Railway line in Kyoto and Shiga Prefectures, Japan

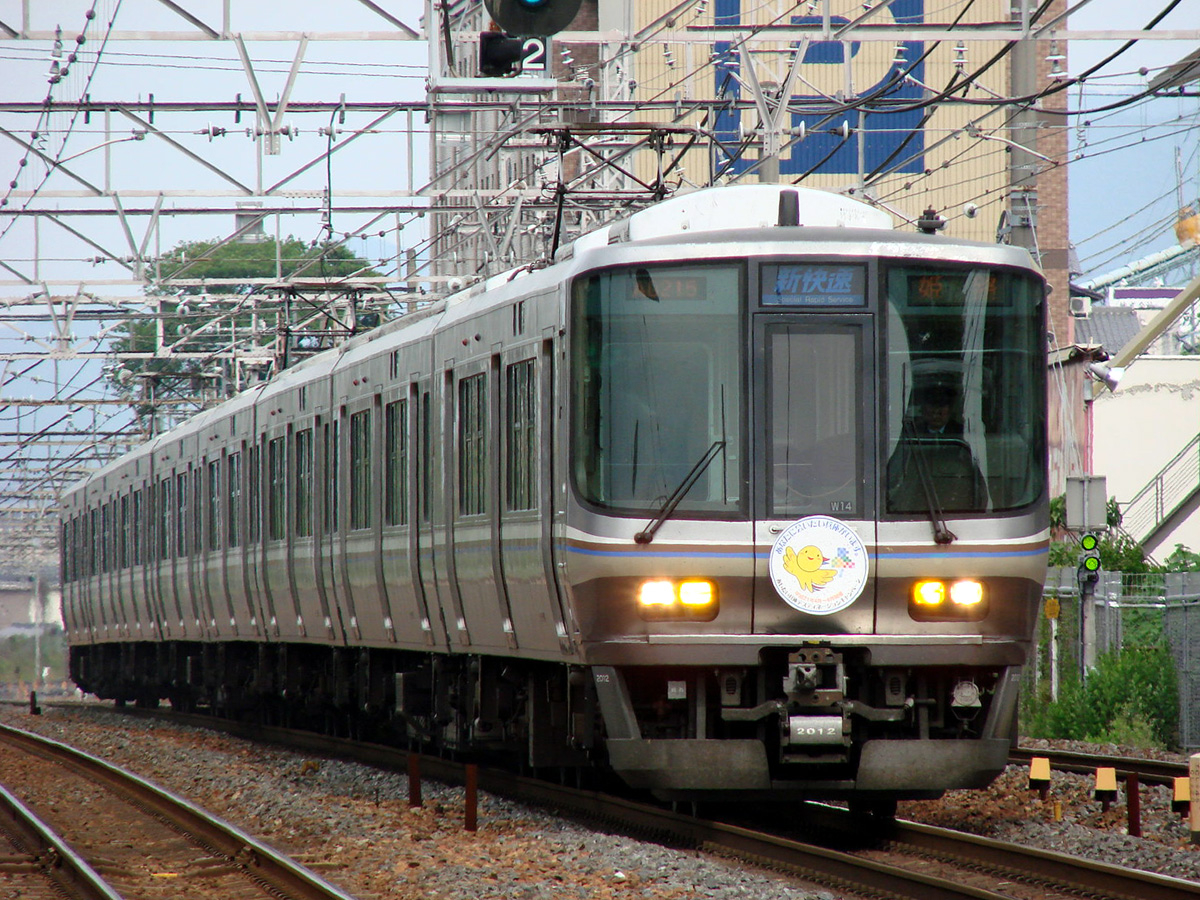
- Biwako Line

Overview
- Native name: 琵琶湖線
- Owner: JR West
- Locale: Kyoto Prefecture and Shiga Prefecture
- Termini: Maibara; Kyoto (Tōkaidō Line) Nagahama (Hokuriku Line)
- Stations: 23

Service
- Type: Heavy rail
- System: Urban Network
- Operator(s): JR West; JR Freight

History
- Opened: May 1, 1882; 143 years ago (as part of Tōkaidō Main Line); March 13, 1988; 37 years ago (renamed as Biwako Line)

Technical
- Line length: 75.4 km (46.9 mi)
- Track gauge: 1,067 mm (3 ft 6 in)
- Electrification: 1,500 V DC overhead line
- Operating speed: 130 km/h (81 mph)

The Biwako Line (琵琶湖線, Biwako-sen) is the nickname used by West Japan Railway Company (JR West) to refer to the portion of the Tōkaidō Main Line (between Maibara Station and Kyoto Station) and the Hokuriku Main Line (between Maibara Station and Nagahama Station). The section, along with JR Kyoto Line and JR Kobe Line, forms a contiguous service that is the main trunk of JR West's "Urban Network" commuter rail network in the Osaka-Kobe-Kyoto Metropolitan Area.

== Overview ==
The line is named after Lake Biwa (琵琶湖, Biwa-ko), which the route runs along. Line nicknames were introduced when the newly privatized JR West intended to use "familiar" names over official line names, such as Tōkaidō Main Line and Fukuchiyama Line. Biwako Line did not appear on the first list, and instead The JR Kyoto Line was to be called up to Maibara. A move in Shiga Prefecture opposed the name, claiming that the name of Kyoto Line in Shiga sounds like an auxiliary, requiring its own name in the prefecture. Biwako Line was thus made to refer to the section between Maibara and Kyoto.

The section of the name was extended to Nagahama, on the alteration of electric supply from 20 kV AC to 1,500 V DC, which enabled through operation to Kyoto and Osaka.

Although the "Biwako Line" nickname is used by the operator JR West for passenger announcements, the official status of Tōkaidō Main Line has not been changed or discussed. The counterpart for the line, Central Japan Railway Company (JR Central) uses its official name "Tōkaidō Main Line" for the section of JR West, at the connections of Kyoto and Maibara. The "Biwako Line" nickname appears in some local newspapers and real estate advertisements. Frequent passengers understand that the Biwako, JR Kyoto, JR Kobe lines are in fact one line, however, public recognition of the name is still in question, especially among non-users along the line.

== Trains ==
- Special Rapid Service (新快速):
  - Trains terminate at Nagahama, Maibara and Yasu (some trains continue on Hokuriku Line to Omi-Shiotsu and Tsuruga). Stops at Nagahama, Tamura, Sakata, Maibara, Hikone, Notogawa, Omi-Hachiman, Yasu, Moriyama, Kusatsu, Minami-Kusatsu, Ishiyama, Otsu, Yamashina, and Kyoto. Continues on JR Kyoto Line to Osaka and beyond.
- Local trains (普通)
  - Operated as rapid service trains when running in the west of Takatsuki (Kyoto in the morning) (3 doors par car)
    - These local trains are mainly operated on the Biwako Line and make every stop on the line. They terminate at Maibara and Yasu.
  - JR Kyoto Line local trains (4 doors par car)
    - JR Kyoto Line local service extends to Yasu during rush hour on weekdays.

== Stations ==
Stations are listed from east to west. The distance of Tokyo – Maibara is 445.9 km (277.1 mi), and that of Tokyo – Kyoto is 513.6 km (319.1 mi). Historically, the Tōkaidō Main Line continued from Tokyo to Kyoto and beyond, through Maibara. In the Japanese timetable books, the distances from Tokyo are still shown in the table, although the Biwako Line's officially begins at Maibara.

- ●: Trains stop.
- ○: Limited stop, early morning and late night only
- |: Trains pass.
- Local (4-door Commuter trains): JR Kyoto Line local trains
- Local (3-door Suburban trains): Operated as Rapid service trains west of Takatsuki (west of Kyoto in the morning)

Official line name	No.	Station	Japanese	Stop			Transfers	Location	
Official line name	No.	Station	Japanese	Local (Commuter)	Local (Suburban)	Special Rapid	Transfers	Ward, City	Prefecture
Through service from/to Hokuriku Main Line
Hokuriku Main Line	JR-A09	Nagahama	長浜		●	●	Hokuriku Main Line for Ōmi-Shiotsu and Tsuruga	Nagahama	Shiga
Hokuriku Main Line	JR-A10	Tamura	田村		●	●		Nagahama	Shiga
Hokuriku Main Line	JR-A11	Sakata	坂田		●	●		Maibara	Shiga
Hokuriku Main Line	JR-A12	Maibara	米原		●	●	JR Central: Tōkaidō Shinkansen; Tokaido Line for Gifu and Nagoya (CA83); ■ Ohmi Railway Main Line	Maibara	Shiga
Tōkaidō Main Line	JR-A12	Maibara	米原		●	●	JR Central: Tōkaidō Shinkansen; Tokaido Line for Gifu and Nagoya (CA83); ■ Ohmi Railway Main Line	Maibara	Shiga
Tōkaidō Main Line	JR-A13	Hikone	彦根		●	●	■ Ohmi Railway Main Line	Hikone	Shiga
Tōkaidō Main Line	JR-A14	Minami-Hikone	南彦根		●	|		Hikone	Shiga
Tōkaidō Main Line	JR-A15	Kawase	河瀬		●	|		Hikone	Shiga
Tōkaidō Main Line	JR-A16	Inae	稲枝		●	|		Hikone	Shiga
Tōkaidō Main Line	JR-A17	Notogawa	能登川		●	●		Higashiōmi	Shiga
Tōkaidō Main Line	JR-A18	Azuchi	安土		●	|		Ōmihachiman	Shiga
Tōkaidō Main Line	JR-A19	Ōmi-Hachiman	近江八幡		●	●	■ Ohmi Railway Yōkaichi Line	Ōmihachiman	Shiga
Tōkaidō Main Line	JR-A20	Shinohara	篠原		●	|		Ōmihachiman	Shiga
Tōkaidō Main Line	JR-A21	Yasu	野洲	○	●	●		Yasu	Shiga
Tōkaidō Main Line	JR-A22	Moriyama	守山	○	●	●		Moriyama	Shiga
Tōkaidō Main Line	JR-A23	Rittō	栗東	○	●	|		Rittō	Shiga
Tōkaidō Main Line	JR-A24	Kusatsu	草津	●	●	●	Kusatsu Line	Kusatsu	Shiga
Tōkaidō Main Line	JR-A25	Minami-Kusatsu	南草津	●	●	●		Kusatsu	Shiga
Tōkaidō Main Line	JR-A26	Seta	瀬田	●	●	|		Ōtsu	Shiga
Tōkaidō Main Line	JR-A27	Ishiyama	石山	●	●	●	Keihan Ishiyama Sakamoto Line (OT03: Keihan Ishiyama Station)	Ōtsu	Shiga
Tōkaidō Main Line	JR-A28	Zeze	膳所	●	●	|	Keihan Ishiyama Sakamoto Line (OT09: Keihan Zeze Station)	Ōtsu	Shiga
Tōkaidō Main Line	JR-A29	Ōtsu	大津	●	●	●		Ōtsu	Shiga
Tōkaidō Main Line	JR-A30	Yamashina	山科	●	●	●	Kosei Line (JR-B30); Kyoto Municipal Subway Tōzai Line (T07); Keihan Keishin Line (OT31: Keihan Yamashina Station)	Yamashina-ku, Kyoto	Kyoto
Tōkaidō Main Line	JR-A31	Kyoto	京都	●	●	●	Tōkaidō Shinkansen; JR Kyoto Line; Nara Line (JR-D01); Sagano Line (Sanin Main Line) (JR-E01); B Kintetsu Kyoto Line (B01); Kyoto Municipal Subway Karasuma Line (K11)	Shimogyo-ku, Kyoto	Kyoto
Through service from/to JR Kyoto Line
Within JR Kyoto Line:				Local (Northbound only)	Rapid	Special Rapid			

== Rolling stock ==
=== Local ===
- 207 series (Yasu – Kusatsu – Kyoto)
- 221 series (through service with Kosei Line and Kusatsu Line)
- 223 series (through service with Kosei Line and Kusatsu Line)
- 321 series (Yasu – Kusatsu – Kyoto, through service with Kosei Line)
- 521-0 series (Nagahama – Maibara, through service with Hokuriku Line)

=== Special Rapid and Local ===
- 223–1000 series (through service with Kusatsu Line, Kosei Line, Hokuriku Line)
- 223-2000 series (through service with Kusatsu Line, Kosei Line, Hokuriku Line)
- 225-0 series (through service with Kusatsu Line, Kosei Line, Hokuriku Line)
- 225-100 series (through service with Kusatsu Line, Kosei Line, Hokuriku Line)

=== Limited Express ===
- 271 series (Haruka service, from Spring 2020)
- 281 series (Haruka service)
- 285 series (Sunrise Izumo/Sunrise Seto service, from 1998)
- 681 series (Biwako Express service)
- 683 series (Biwako Express service)
- KiHa 189 series (Biwako Express service, from March 2014)
- KiHa 85 series (JR Central) (Hida service)

=== Former ===
- 485 series (Biwako Liner rapid service until June 2003)
- 583 series (Express Kitaguni until January 2013)
- 383 series (JR Central) (Limited Express Shinano until 26 March 2016)
- 113 series
- 117 series
- 125 series
