= Sakata Station (Shiga) =

Railway station in Maibara, Shiga Prefecture, Japan

Sakata Station 坂田駅
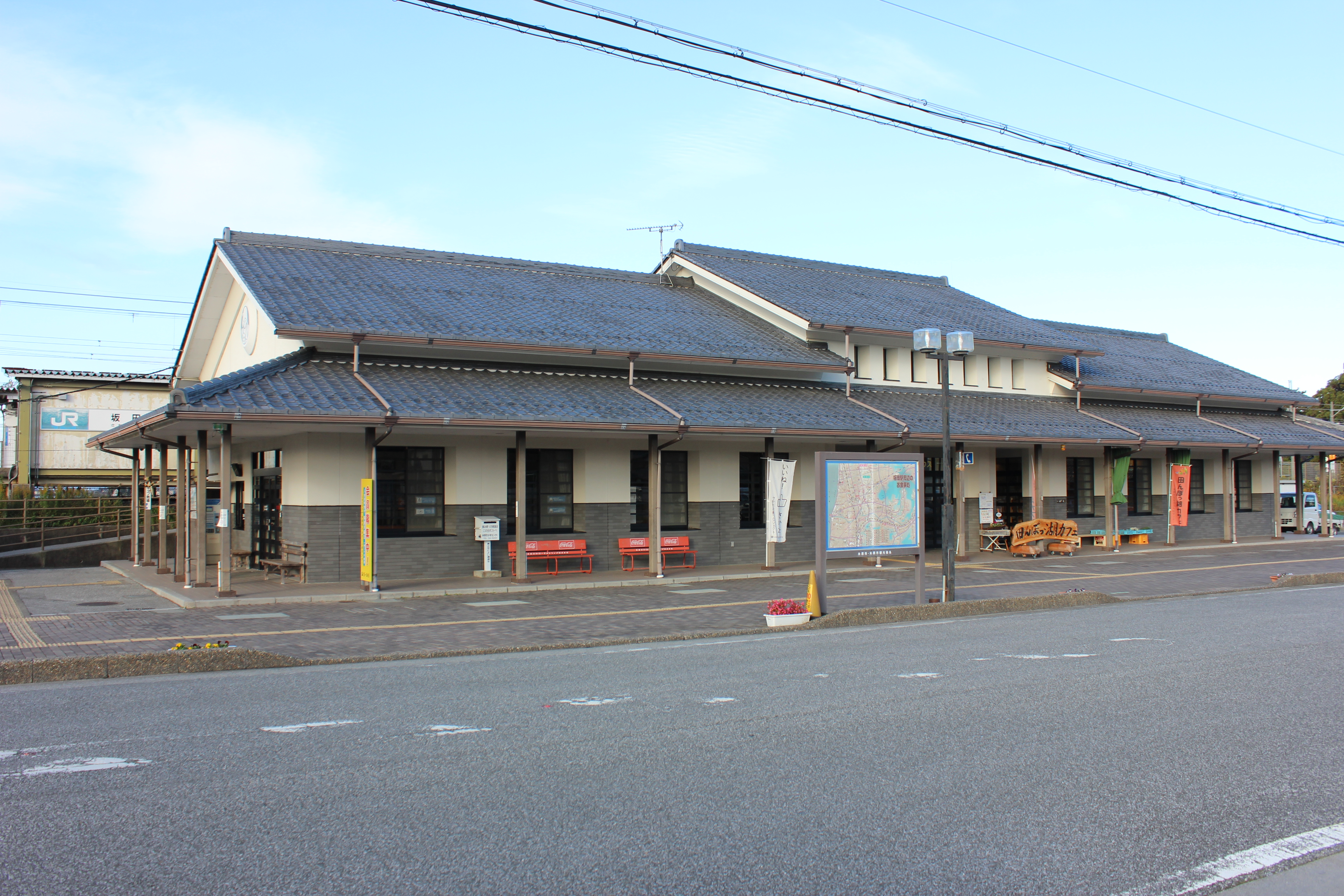
- Sakata Station, November 2020

General information
- Location: 842 Ukano, Maibara-shi, Shiga-ken 521-0062; Japan
- Coordinates: 35.336116°N 136.287739°E
- System: JR-West regional rail station
- Operator: JR West
- Line: Biwako Line
- Distance: 2.4 km from Maibara
- Platforms: 2 side platforms

Construction
- Structure type: Ground level

Other information
- Station code: JR-A11
- Website: Official website

History
- Opened: 15 September 1931
- Closed: 1940-1954
- Former names: Hoshoji (to 1954)

Passengers
- FY 2023: 1,114 daily
Location
- Location within Shiga Prefecture Location within Japan

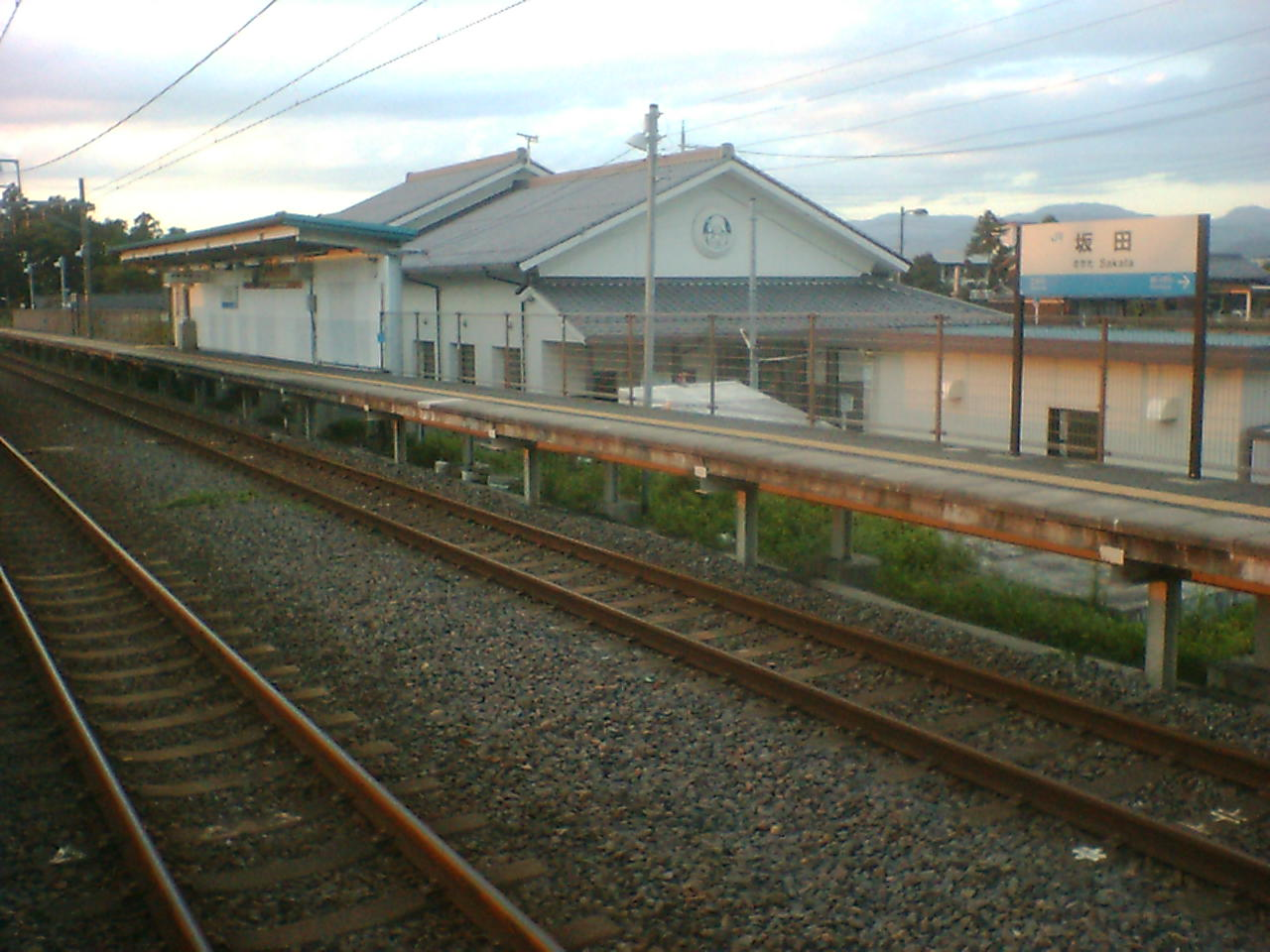
Platform

Sakata Station (坂田駅, Sakata-eki) is a passenger railway station located in the city of Maibara, Shiga, Japan, operated by the West Japan Railway Company (JR West).

== Lines ==
Sakata Station is served by the Biwako Line portion of the Hokuriku Main Line, and is 2.4 kilometers from the terminus of the line at Maibara.

== Station layout ==
The station consists of two opposed unnumbered side platforms connected by an underground passage. The station is unattended.

== Platform ==
east	■ Biwako Line	for Maibara and Kyoto
west	■ Biwako Line	for Nagahama, Tsuruga

== Adjacent stations ==
«	Service	»
Biwako Line
Special Rapid: Does not stop at this station
Limited Express "Hida": Does not stop at this station
Maibara	Local	Tamura

== History ==
The station opened on September 15, 1931 as Hoshoji Station (法性寺駅, Hoshoji-eki) on the Japanese Government Railway (JGR) Hokuriku Main Line. The station was closed on November 1, 1940 and reopened as "Sakata Station" on August 1, 1954 under the Japan National Railways (JNR) after World War II. The station came under the aegis of the West Japan Railway Company (JR West) on April 1, 1987 due to the privatization of JNR. The station was relocated 200 meters towards Maibara and the platforms lengthened in 1991.

Station numbering was introduced in March 2018 with Sakata being assigned station number JR-A11.

== Passenger statistics ==
In fiscal 2019, the station was used by an average of 636 passengers daily (boarding passengers only).

== Surrounding area ==
- Maibara City Sakata Elementary School
- Statue of Yamauchi Kazutoyo and his wife Chiyo (located in front of the station).

== See also ==
- List of railway stations in Japan
