= Kusatsu Station (Shiga) =

Railway station in Kusatsu, Shiga Prefecture, Japan

Kusatsu Station 草津駅
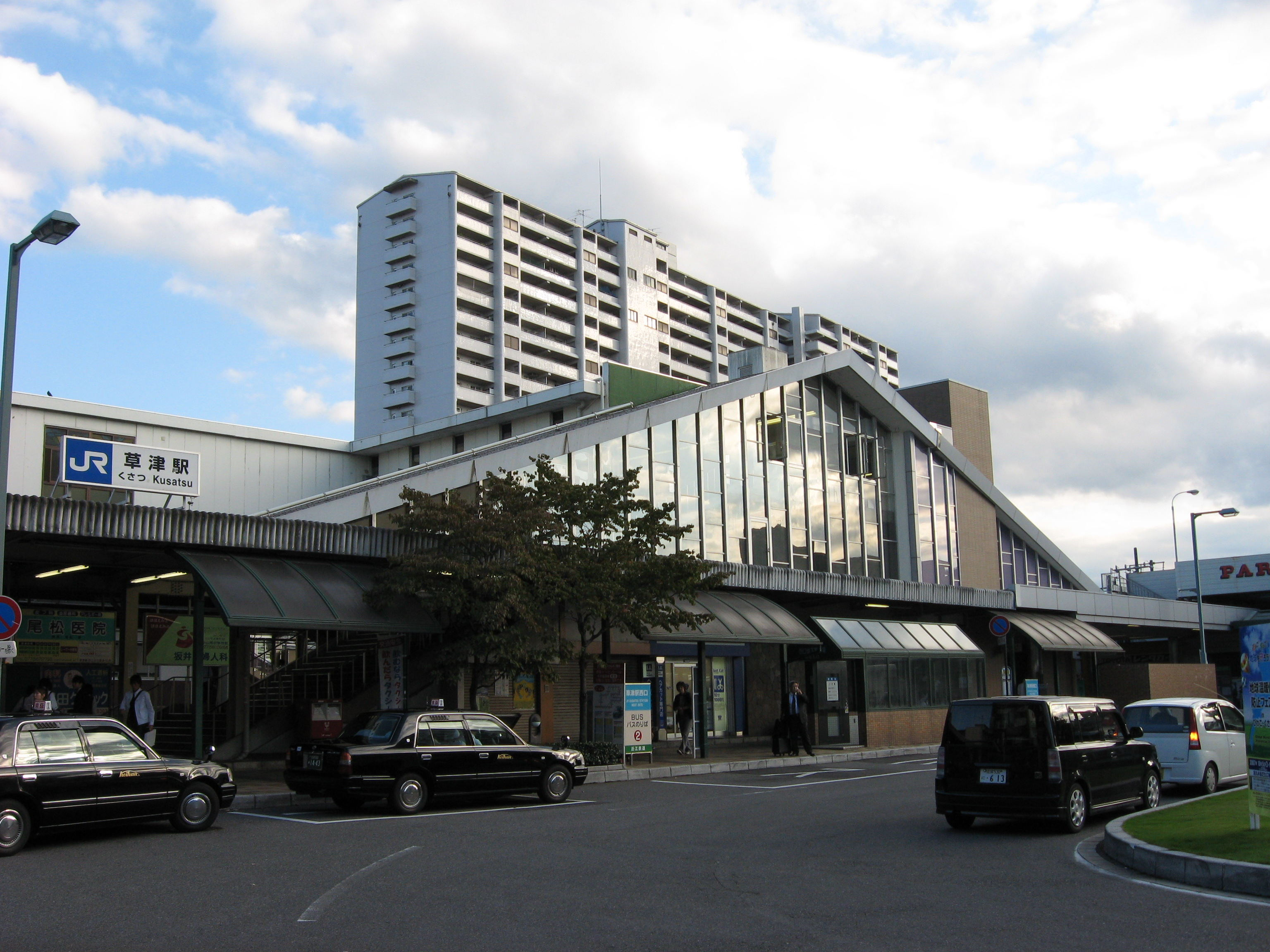
- Kusatsu Station west entrance in October 2007

General information
- Location: 1-1-16 Shibukawa, Kusatsu City, Shiga Prefecture 525-0026; Japan
- Coordinates: 35°01′20″N 135°57′42″E
- Operator: JR West
- Lines: A Biwako Line (Tōkaidō Main Line); C Kusatsu Line
- Distance: 45.5 km (28.3 mi) from Maibara
- Platforms: 3 island platforms
- Tracks: 8

Construction
- Structure type: Ground level

Other information
- Station code: JR-A24
- Website: Official website

History
- Opened: 1 July 1889; 137 years ago

Passengers
- FY 2023: 58,114 daily

Services
Preceding station	JR West	Following station
Minami-Kusatsu towards Kyoto	Biwako Line Local	Rittō towards Nagahama
through to Biwako Line	Kusatsu Line Local	Tehara towards Tsuge
Location
- Location within Shiga Prefecture Location within Kansai region Location within Japan

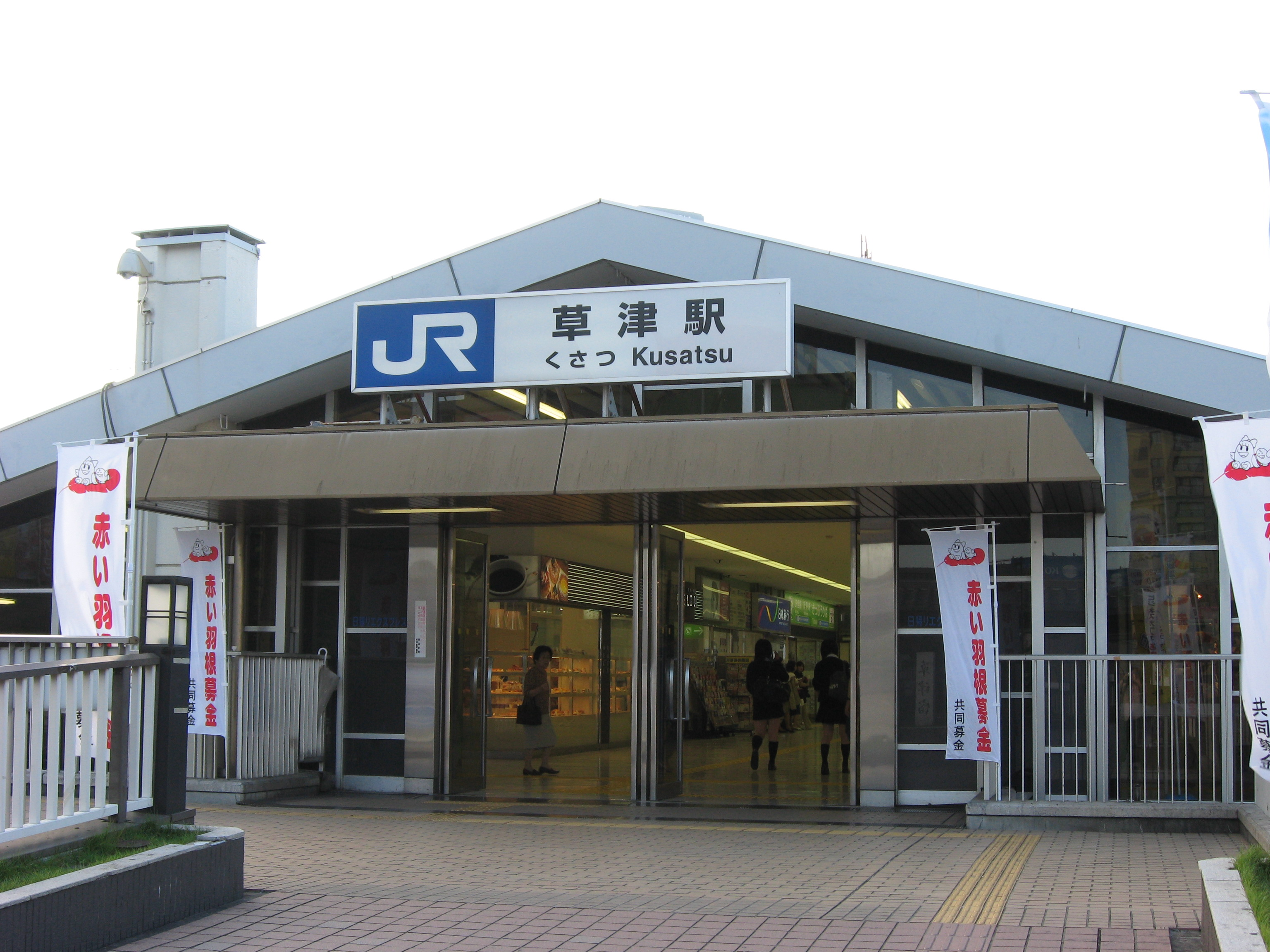
Kusatsu Station east entrance in October 2007

Kusatsu Station (草津駅, Kusatsu-eki) is a junction passenger railway station located in the city of Kusatsu, Shiga Prefecture, Japan, operated by West Japan Railway Company (JR West).

== Lines ==
Kusatsu Station is served by the Biwako Line portion of the Tōkaidō Main Line, and is 45.5 kilometers from Maibara and 491.4 kilometers from Tokyo. It is also served by the Kusatsu Line and is 36.7 kilometers from the terminus of that line at Tsuge.

== Station layout ==
The station consists of three island platforms serving two tracks each, connected by an elevated concourse, and two tracks without platforms. The station has a "Midori no Madoguchi" staffed ticket office.

=== Platforms ===
1	■ Kusatsu Line	for Kibukawa and Tsuge
2	■ Kusatsu Line	for Kibukawa and Tsuge
2	■ Biwako Line	from the Kusatsu Line for Kyoto and Osaka
3	■ Biwako Line	for Kyoto and Osaka limited express Biwako Express, Hida for Kyoto and Osaka; Kansai Airport limited express Haruka for Kansai Airport
4	■ Biwako Line	for Kyoto and Osaka
5	■ Biwako Line	for Maibara and Nagahama
6	■ Biwako Line	for Maibara and Nagahama limited express Haruka, Biwako Express for Maibara limited express Hida for Takayama
6	■ Kusatsu Line	from Biwako Line for Kibukawa and Tsuge

== Adjacent stations ==
«	Service	»
Tokaido Line (Biwako Line)
Maibara	Limited Express Hida	Kyoto
Moriyama	Kansai Airport Limited Express Haruka	Ishiyama
Moriyama	Special Rapid	Minami-Kusatsu
Rittō	Local	Minami-Kusatsu
Kusatsu Line
Tehara	Local	Through to Biwako Line

== History ==
The station opened on 1 July 1889. With the privatization of Japanese National Railways (JNR) on 1 April 1987, the station came under the control of JR West.

Station numbering was introduced to the Tokaido Line in March 2018 with Kusatsu being assigned station number JR-A24.

== Passenger statistics ==
In fiscal 2019, the station was used by an average of 29,569 passengers daily (boarding passengers only).

== Surrounding area ==
=== East ===
- Kusatsu City Hall
- Kusatsu Police Station
- Kusatsu Tax Office
- LT 932, Garden City Kusatsu
- Kintetsu Department Store Kusatsu

=== West ===
- Hotel Boston Plaza Kusatsu

== See also ==
- List of railway stations in Japan
