= Maibara Station =

Railway station in Maibara, Shiga Prefecture, Japan

CA83 A 12 Maibara Station 米原駅
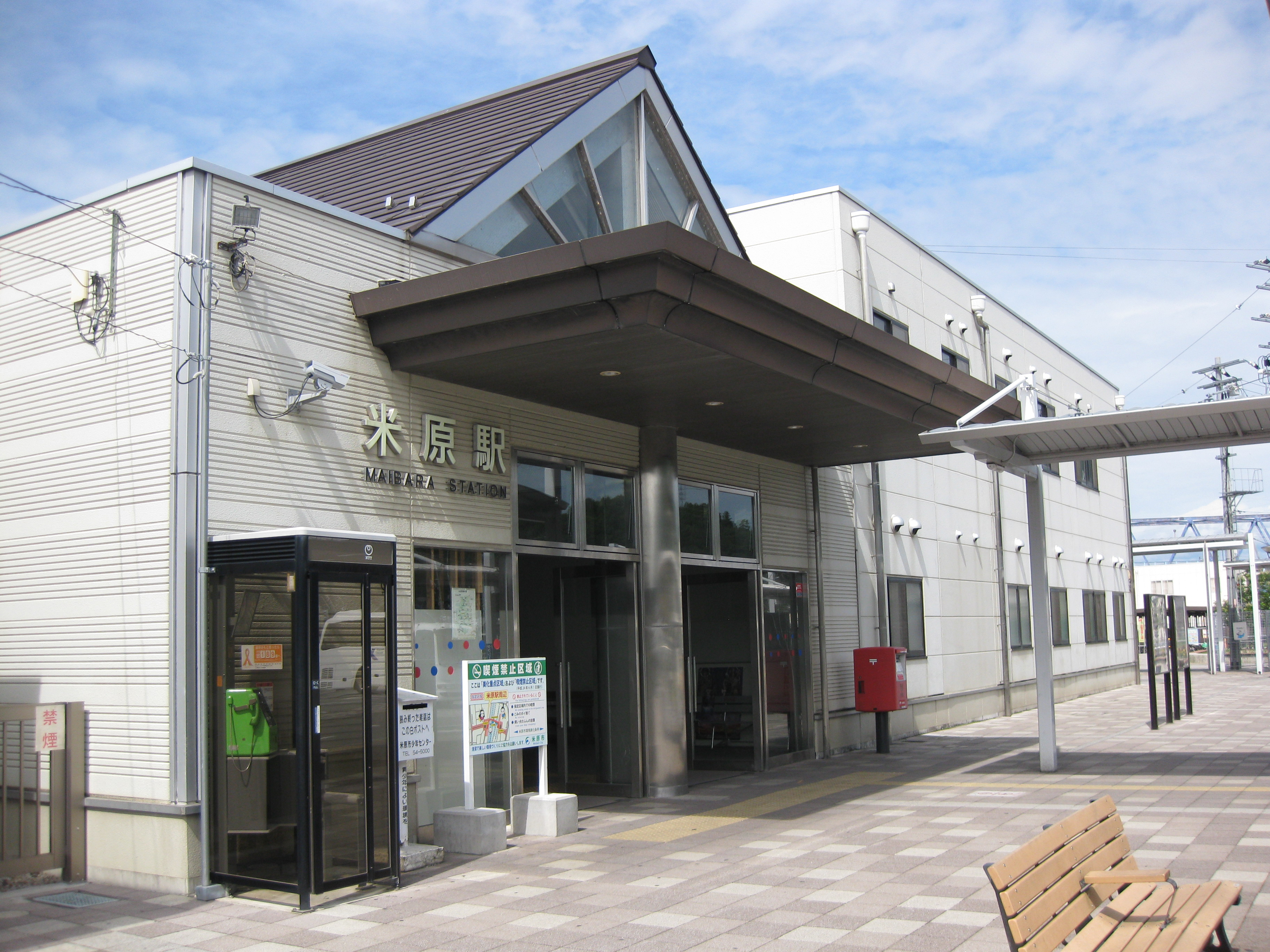
- East side of the station in September 2016

General information
- Location: Maibara, Shiga; Japan
- Coordinates: 35°18′51.05″N 136°17′25.76″E
- Operator: JR Central; JR West; Ohmi Railway
- Lines: Tōkaidō Shinkansen; Hokuriku Main Line; Biwako Line; Ohmi Railway Main Line
- Platforms: 5 island platforms, 1 side platform
- Tracks: 9 (3 Shinkansen)

Construction
- Structure type: At grade

Other information
- Station code: JR-A12 (JR West); CA-83 (JR Central); OR-01 (Ohmi Railway)

History
- Opened: 1 July 1889; 137 years ago

Passengers
- FY 2023: 10,366 daily (JR West); 12,080 daily (JR Central); 178 daily (Ohmi Railway)

Services
Preceding station	JR Central	Following station
Kyoto towards Shin-Ōsaka	Tōkaidō Shinkansen Hikari Kodama	Gifu-Hashima towards Tokyo
Location
- Location within Shiga Prefecture Location within Japan

Maibara Station (Japanese: 米原駅, Hepburn: Maibara-eki) is an interchange passenger railway station located in the city of Maibara, Shiga, Japan. On the border between West Japan Railway Company (JR West) and Central Japan Railway Company (JR Central), it is jointly operated by both companies, along with the private railway operator Ohmi Railway. It is also a freight depot for the Japan Freight Railway Company (JR Freight).

== Lines ==
Maibara Station is served by the JR West Hokuriku Main Line and the Biwako Line section of the Tōkaidō Main Line. It is also served by the JR Central Tōkaidō Shinkansen and the JR Central portion of Tōkaidō Main Line towards Ōgaki and Gifu. It is 445.9 kilometers from Tokyo Station and is the southern terminus of the 176.6 kilometer Hokuriku Main Line to Kanazawa. It is also the terminus for the 44.7 kilometer Ohmi Railway Main Line to Kibukawa.

== Station layout ==
=== JR ===
The JR portion of the station consists of three island platforms with six tracks for the Tōkaidō Line and the Hokuriku Line. There is an island platform, and a side platform with five tracks for the Tōkaidō Shinkansen.

==== Platforms ====
2, 3	■ Biwako Line	■ local, ■ special rapid, ■ limited express and ■ express for Kusatsu, Kyoto and Osaka
5, 6, 7	■ Hokuriku Line	■ local, ■ special rapid and ■ Shirasagi for Tsuruga
7, 8	■ Tōkaidō Line	■ local, ■ rapid, ■ new rapid, ■ special rapid and ■ Shirasagi for Ogaki, Gifu and Nagoya ■ Hida for Gero and Takayama
11	■ Tōkaidō Shinkansen	Hikari and Kodama for Shin-Ōsaka
12	■ Tōkaidō Shinkansen	Hikari and Kodama for Tokyo
13	■ Tōkaidō Shinkansen	Hikari and Kodama for Tokyo

=== Ohmi Railway ===
The Ohmi Railway portion of the station consists of one island platform serving two tracks.

==== Platforms ====
1, 2	■ Main Line	for Taga Taisha-mae, Yōkaichi, Ōmi-Hachiman and Kibukawa

== Adjacent stations ==
«	Service	»
Biwako Line (Tokaido Line)
Terminus	Local (3 doors)	Hikone
Terminus	Special Rapid Service	Hikone
Ogaki	Limited Express Hida	Kusatsu
Biwako Line (Hokuriku Line)
Terminus	Local	Sakata
Terminus	Special Rapid Service	Sakata
Ogaki	Limited Express Shirasagi	Nagahama or Tsuruga
Tokaido Line
Samegai	Local	Terminus
Samegai	Semi Rapid (terminating only)	Terminus
Samegai	Rapid	Terminus
Samegai	New Rapid	Terminus
Samegai	Special Rapid	Terminus
Ogaki	Limited Express Hida	Kusatsu
Ogaki	Limited Express Shirasagi	Nagahama or Tsuruga
Ohmi Railway Main Line (Hikone Taga-Taisha Line)
Terminus	Local	Fujitec-mae

== History ==
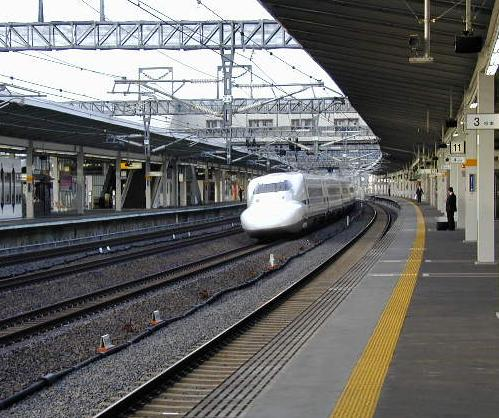
Shinkansen platforms

Maibara Station opened on 1 July 1889 as a station on the Japanese Government Railway (JGR) Tōkaidō Line, which became the Japan National Railways (JNR) after World War II. The Ohmi Railway began operations of 15 March 1931. The station came under the aegis of the West Japan Railway Company (JR West) on 1 April 1987 due to the privatization of the JNR.

Station numbering was introduced to the JR West and JR Central platforms in March 2018 with Maibara being assigned station number JR-A12 for the Biwako Line and CA83 on the JR Central network.

== Passenger statistics ==
In fiscal 2018, the JR West portion of the station was used by an average of 5,514 passengers daily, the JR Central portion by 7,240 passengers daily (boarding passengers only). The Ohmi Railway portion of the station was used by 1,069 passengers daily (boarding passengers only) in 2015.

== Surrounding area ==
- Maibara City Society of Commerce
- Shiga Prefectural Cultural Industry Exchange Center
- Shiga Prefectural Maibara High School
- Yanmar Central Research Institute

== See also ==
- List of railway stations in Japan
