= Nagahama Station =

Railway station in Nagahama, Shiga Prefecture, Japan

Nagahama Station 長浜駅
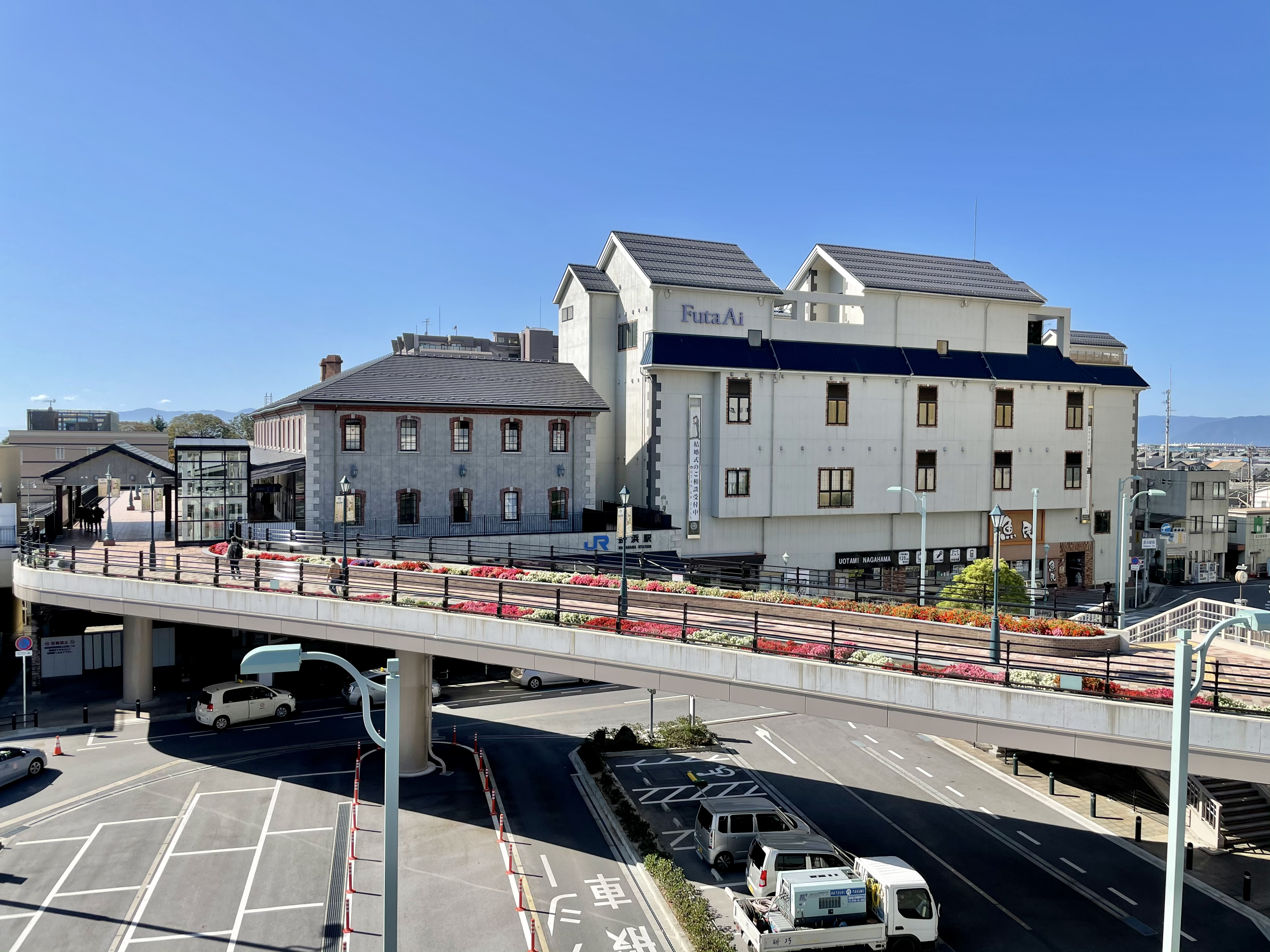
- The east entrance of Nagahama Station, October 2010

General information
- Location: 1 Kitafunachō, Nagahama-shi, Shiga-ken 526-0057; Japan
- Coordinates: 35.378483°N 136.265262°E
- Operator: JR West
- Line: Hokuriku Main Line
- Distance: 7.7 km from Maibara
- Platforms: 1 side + 1 island platform

Construction
- Structure type: Ground level

Other information
- Station code: JR-A09
- Website: Official website

History
- Opened: 10 March 1882

Passengers
- FY 2023: 7,780 daily
Location
- Location within Shiga Prefecture Location within Japan

Nagahama Station (長浜駅, Nagahama-eki) is a passenger railway station located in the city of Nagahama, Shiga Prefecture, Japan, operated by West Japan Railway Company (JR West).

== Lines ==
Nagahama Station is served by the Hokuriku Main Line, and is 7.7 kilometers from the terminus of the line at Maibara. Between 1991 and 2006, the station was the dividing point of electrification systems (south of the station, including the station, was 1500 V DC and north was 20,000 V AC) so that all regional trains from Osaka and Kyoto using DC-only electric multiple units terminated at this station. In 2006 the DC zone was extended to Tsuruga Station, but there still exist some terminating trains at Nagahama.

== Station layout ==
The station consists of one side platform and one island platform with an elevated station building located above the platforms. The island platform has a cut-out, allowing part of the platform to serve an additional track. The station has a Midori no Madoguchi staffed ticket office.

=== Platforms ===
1	■ Hokuriku Main Line	for Maibara and Kyoto
2	■ Hokuriku Main Line	for Kinomoto and Tsuruga
3	■ Hokuriku Main Line	for Kinomoto and Tsuruga
4	■ Hokuriku Main Line	for Tsuruga

== History ==
Nagahama Station opened on March 10, 1882 under the Japanese Government Railway (JGR). At the time it was the terminal of the railway between Nagahama and Tsuruga. The station became an intermediate station when railway was extended from Nagahama to Sekigahara on May 1, 1883. The route to Sekigahara was later replaced by the route to Maibara. Until 1889 when the Tōkaidō Main Line was completed by the opening of the last section in Shiga Prefecture, Nagahama was a connection point of the railway and the boat on the Biwa Lake which fulfilled the gap of the railways east and west of the lake. The original station, built 1882, is now preserved as a museum (The Old Nagahama Station Museum), and is the oldest preserved railroad station in Japan.

The station came under the aegis of the West Japan Railway Company (JR West) on 1 April 1987 due to the privatization of JNR.

Station numbering was introduced in March 2018 with Nagahama being assigned station number JR-A09.

== Passenger statistics ==
In fiscal 2019, the station was used by an average of 4391 passengers daily (boarding passengers only).

== Gallery ==
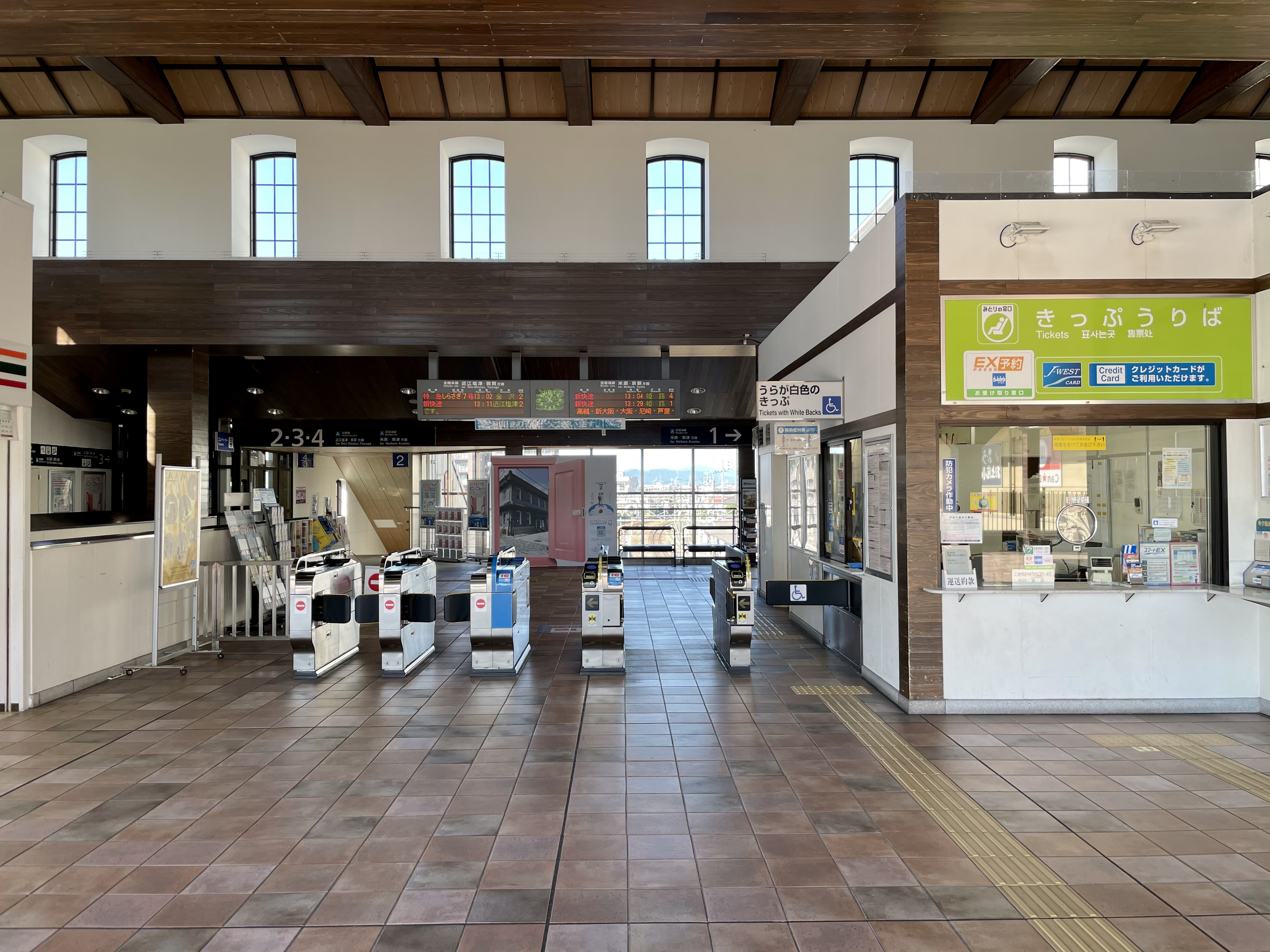
Ticket gate, October 2020

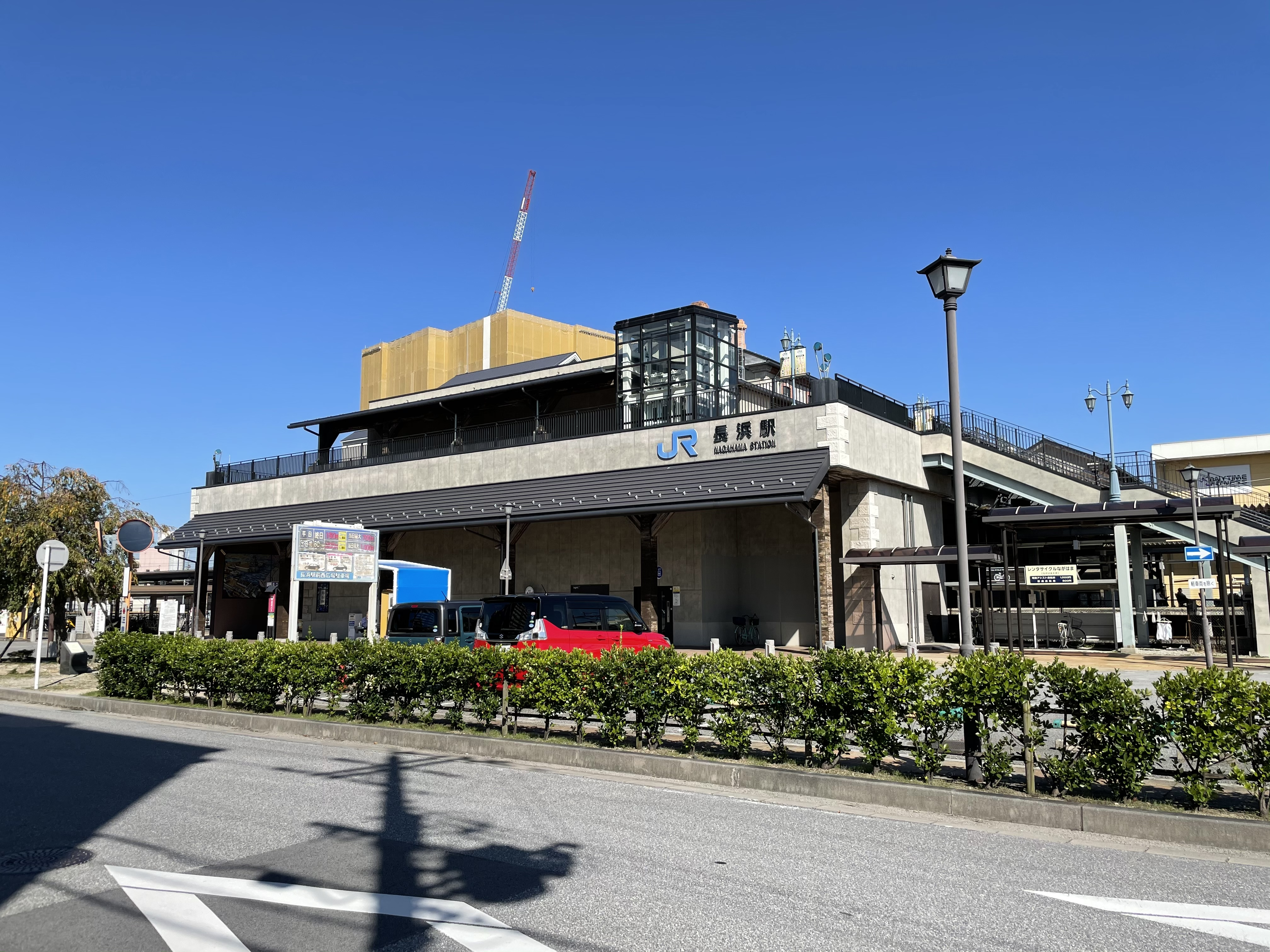
West exit, October 2020

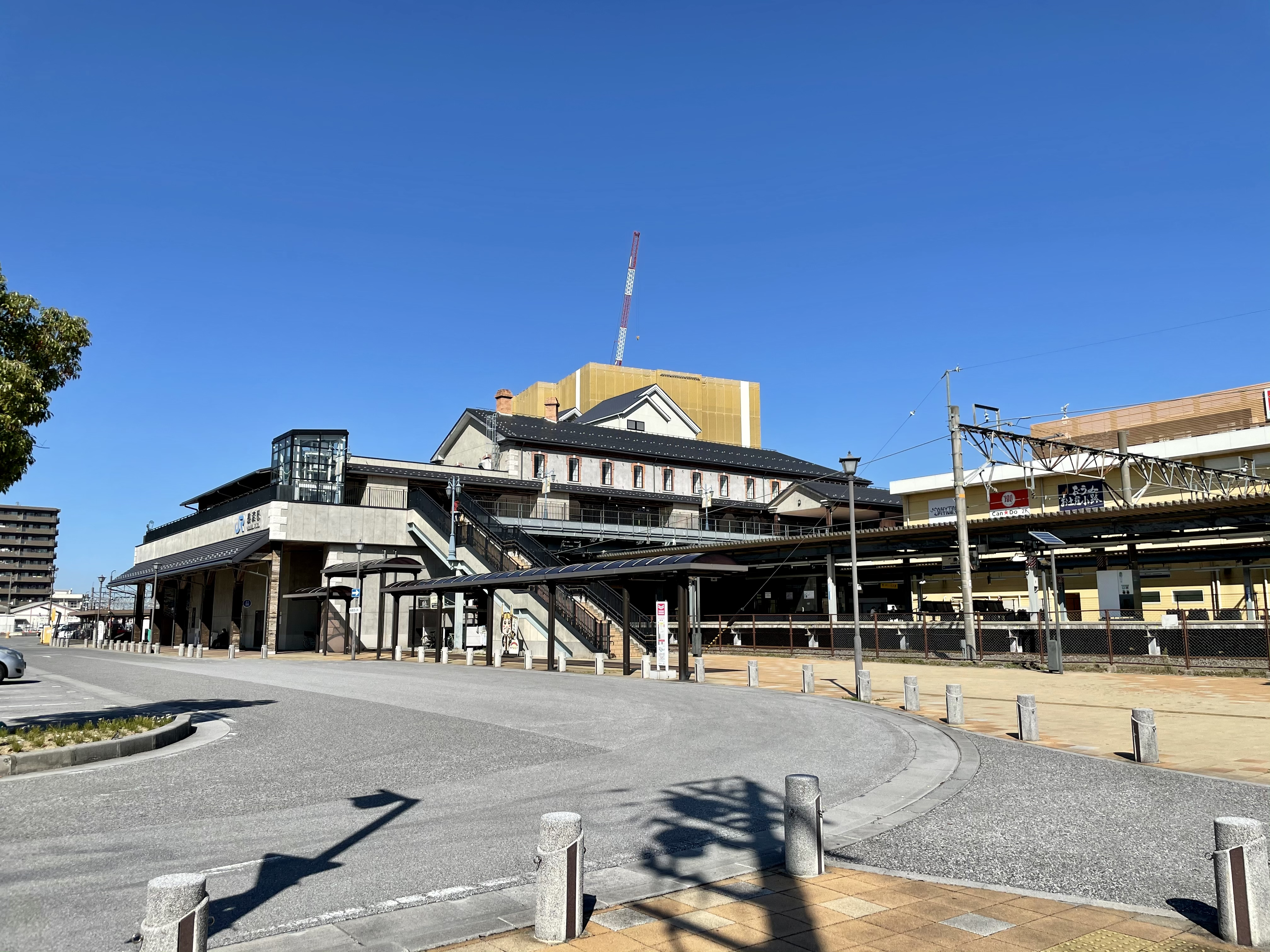
South exit, October 2020

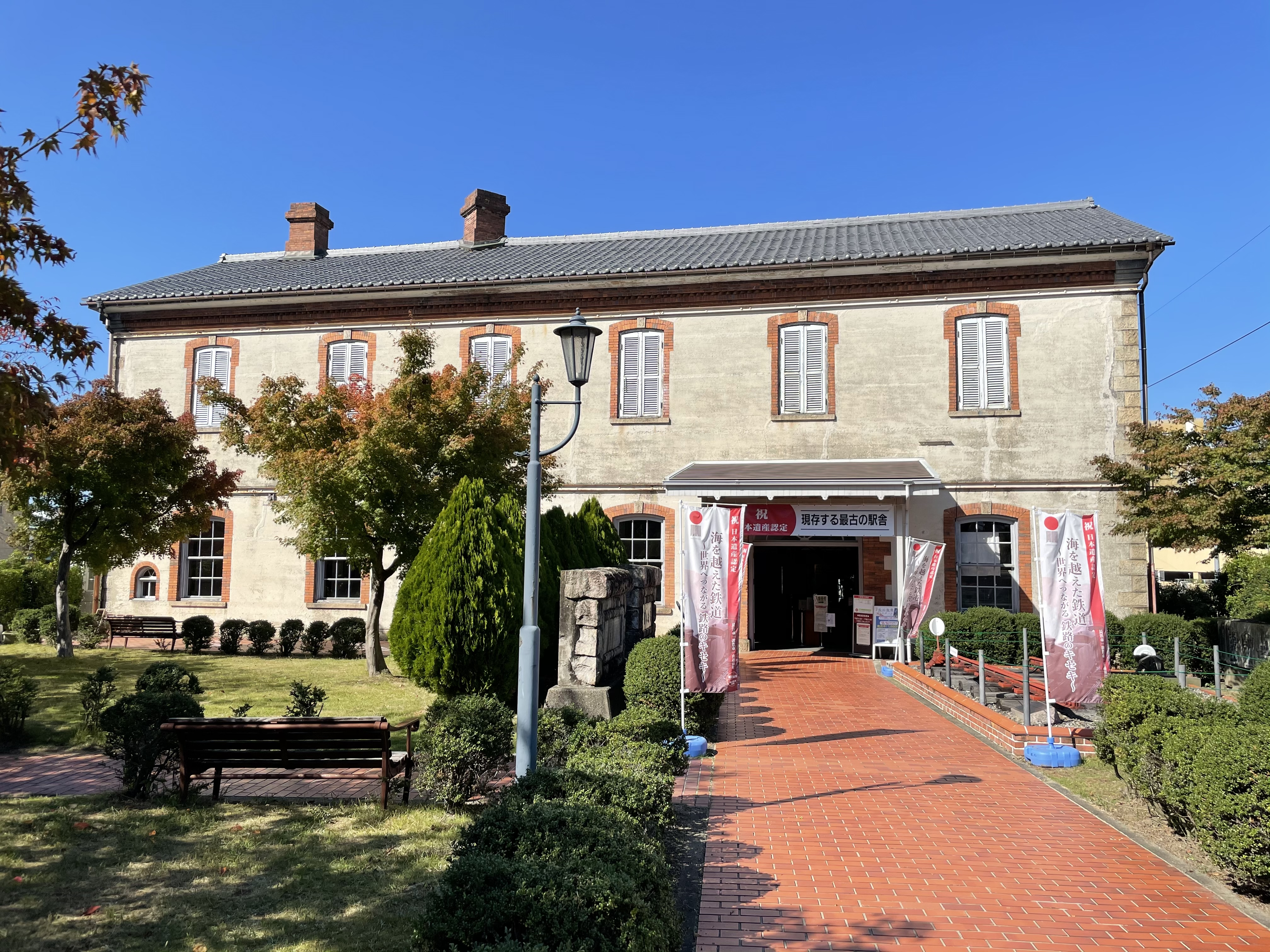
Original Station Building (now a museum)

== Surrounding area ==
- Nagahama City Office
- Nagahama Castle (Nagahama Castle Historical Museum)
- Nagahama Port

== See also ==
- List of railway stations in Japan
