= Amago Station =

Railway station in Kōra, Shiga Prefecture, Japan

Amago Station 尼子駅
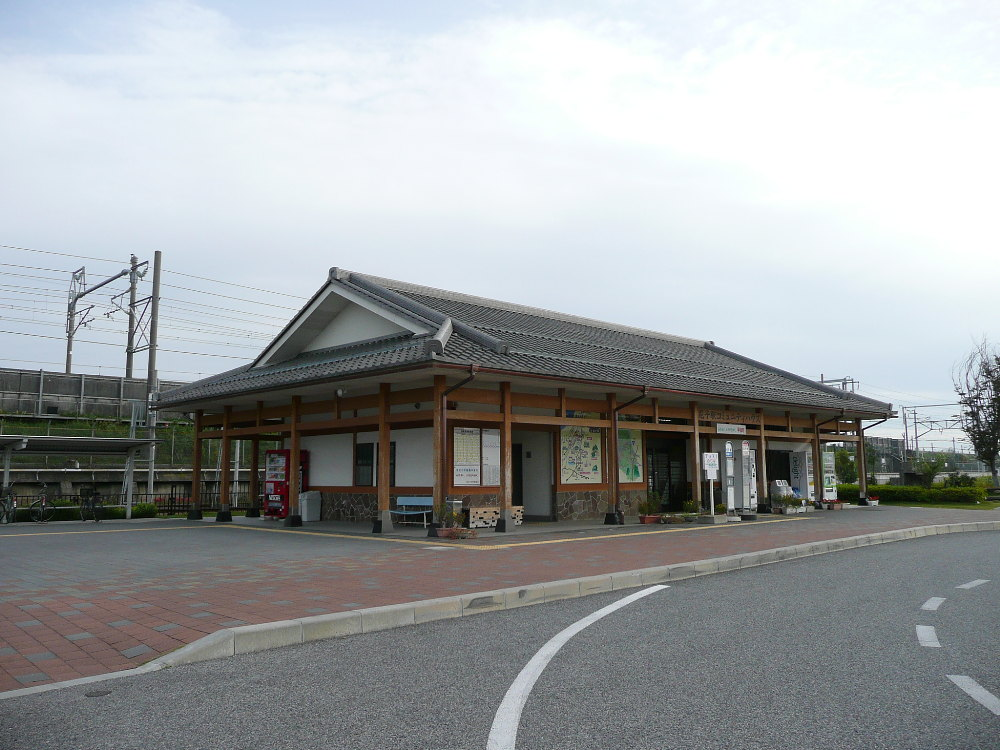
- Amago Station in October 2007

General information
- Location: 1712-2 Amago, Kōra-chō, Inukami-gun, Shiga-ken 522-0242; Japan
- Coordinates: 35.2138°N 136.2462°E
- Operator: Ohmi Railway
- Line: ■ Ohmi Railway Main Line
- Distance: 12.7 km from Maibara
- Platforms: 1 island platform

Other information
- Station code: OR10
- Website: Official website

History
- Opened: June 1, 1911

Passengers
- FY2015: 285 daily
Location
- Location within Shiga Prefecture Location within Japan

Amago Station (尼子駅, Amago-eki) is a passenger railway station in located in the town of Kōra, Shiga Prefecture, Japan, operated by the private railway operator Ohmi Railway.

== Lines ==
Amago Station is served by the Ohmi Railway Main Line, and is located 12.7 rail kilometers from the terminus of the line at Maibara Station.

== Station layout ==
The station consists of a single island platform connected to the station building by a level crossing. The station building also functions as a local community center, but is unattended.

== Platform ==
■ Main Line	for Hikone and Maibara
■ Main Line	for Yokaichi, Kibukawa and Ōmi-Hachiman

== Adjacent stations ==
«	Service	»
Ohmi Railway Main Line
Rapid: Does not stop at this station
Takamiya	Local	Toyosato

== History ==
Amago Station was opened on June 1, 1911. The station was relocated 100 meters towards Kibukawa in November 2002 and a new station building was completed on November 3, 2003.

== Surroundings ==
- Nakasendō
- Kōra Municipal Kora Nishi Elementary School

== See also ==
- List of railway stations in Japan
