= Tarōbōgū-mae Station =

Railway station in Higashiōmi, Shiga Prefecture, Japan

Tarōbōgūmae Station 太郎坊宮前駅
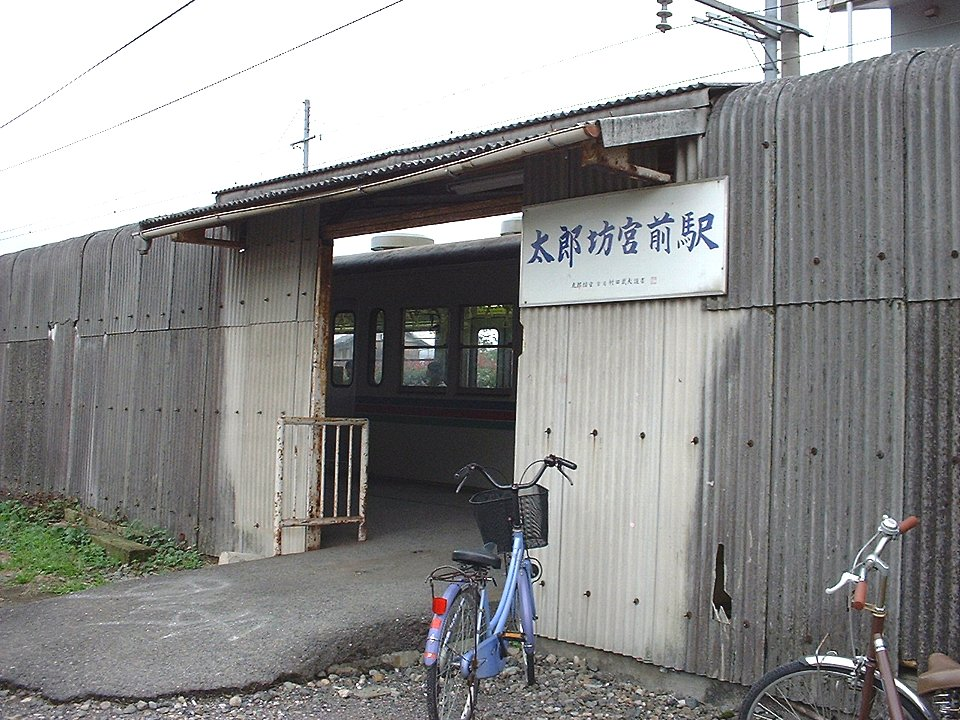
- Tarōbōgūmae Station, July 2003

General information
- Location: 2-10 Yōkaichishimizu, Higashiōmi-shi, Shiga-ken 27-0018; Japan
- Coordinates: 35.1084°N 136.1840°E
- Operator: Ohmi Railway
- Line: ■ Ohmi Railway Yōkaichi Line
- Distance: 1.3 km from Yōkaichi
- Platforms: 1 side platform

Other information
- Station code: OR17
- Website: Official website

History
- Opened: December 29, 1913
- Former names: Tarōbō (until 1919)

Passengers
- FY2019: 501 daily
Location
- Location within Shiga Prefecture Location within Japan

Tarōbōgūmae Station (太郎坊宮前駅, Tarōbōgūmae-eki) is a passenger railway station in located in the city of Higashiōmi, Shiga Prefecture, Japan, operated by the private railway operator Ohmi Railway. Although Ohmi Railway did use the name Tarōbōgū-mae with long sound for the first "o" on its web page, as of 2024 it does use the name Tarobōgū-mae with a short sound for the first "o".

== Lines ==
Tarōbōgūmae Station is served by the Ohmi Railway Yōkaichi Line, and is located 1.3 rail kilometers from the terminus of the line at Yōkaichi Station.

== Station layout ==
The station consists of one side platform serving a single bi-directional track. The station is unattended.

== Platforms ==
■ Yōkaichi Line	for Yōkaichi for Omi-Hachiman

== Adjacent stations ==
«	Service	»
Ohmi Railway Yōkaichi Line
Rapid: Does not stop at this station
Shin-Yōkaichi	Local	Ichinobe

== History ==
Tarōbōgūmae Station was opened on December 29, 1913 as Tarōbō Station (太郎坊駅, Tarōbō-eki) . It was renamed to its present name on April 1, 1998.

== Passenger statistics ==
In fiscal 2019, the station was used by an average of 415 passengers daily (boarding passengers only).

== Surroundings ==
- Agata Jinja (Tarōbōgū)
- Japan National Route 421

== See also ==
- List of railway stations in Japan
