= Ichinobe Station =

Railway station in Higashiōmi, Shiga Prefecture, Japan

Ichinobe Station 市辺駅
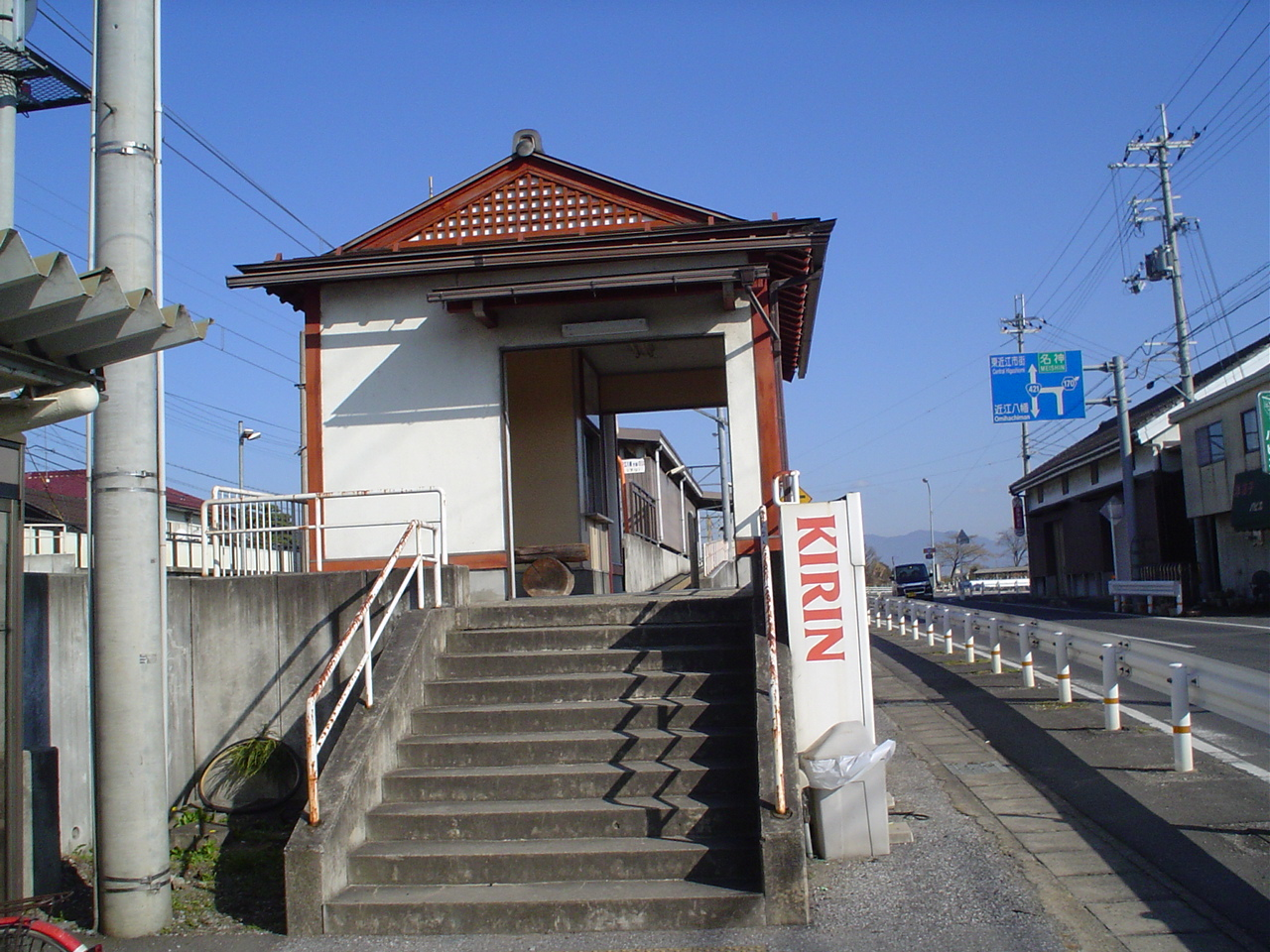
- Ichinobe Station, December 2008

General information
- Location: 2801 Ichinobe, Higashiōmi-shi, Shiga-ken 527-0074; Japan
- Coordinates: 35.1038°N 136.1655°E
- Operator: Ohmi Railway
- Line: ■ Ohmi Railway Yōkaichi Line
- Distance: 3..0 km from Yōkaichi
- Platforms: 2 side platforms

Other information
- Station code: OR18
- Website: Official website

History
- Opened: December 29, 1913

Passengers
- FY2019: 210 daily
Location
- Location within Shiga Prefecture Location within Japan

Ichinobe Station (市辺駅, Ichinobe-eki) is a passenger railway station in located in the city of Higashiōmi, Shiga Prefecture, Japan, operated by the private railway operator Ohmi Railway.

== Lines ==
Ichinobe Station is served by the Ohmi Railway Yōkaichi Line, and is located 3.0 rail kilometers from the terminus of the line at Yōkaichi Station.

== Station layout ==
The station consists of two unnumbered side platforms connected to the station building by a level crossing. The station is unattended.

== Platforms ==
■ Yōkaichi Line	for Yōkaichi
■ Yōkaichi Line	for Omi-Hachiman

== Adjacent stations ==
«	Service	»
Ohmi Railway Yōkaichi Line
Rapid: Does not stop at this station
Tarōbōgū-mae	Local	Hirata

== History ==
Ichinobe Station was opened on December 29, 1913.

== Passenger statistics ==
In fiscal 2019, the station was used by an average of 210 passengers daily (boarding passengers only).

== Surroundings ==
- Higashiomi City Funaoka Junior High School
- Japan National Route 421

== See also ==
- List of railway stations in Japan
