= Gokashō Station =

Railway station in Higashiōmi, Shiga Prefecture, Japan

Gokashō Station 五箇荘駅
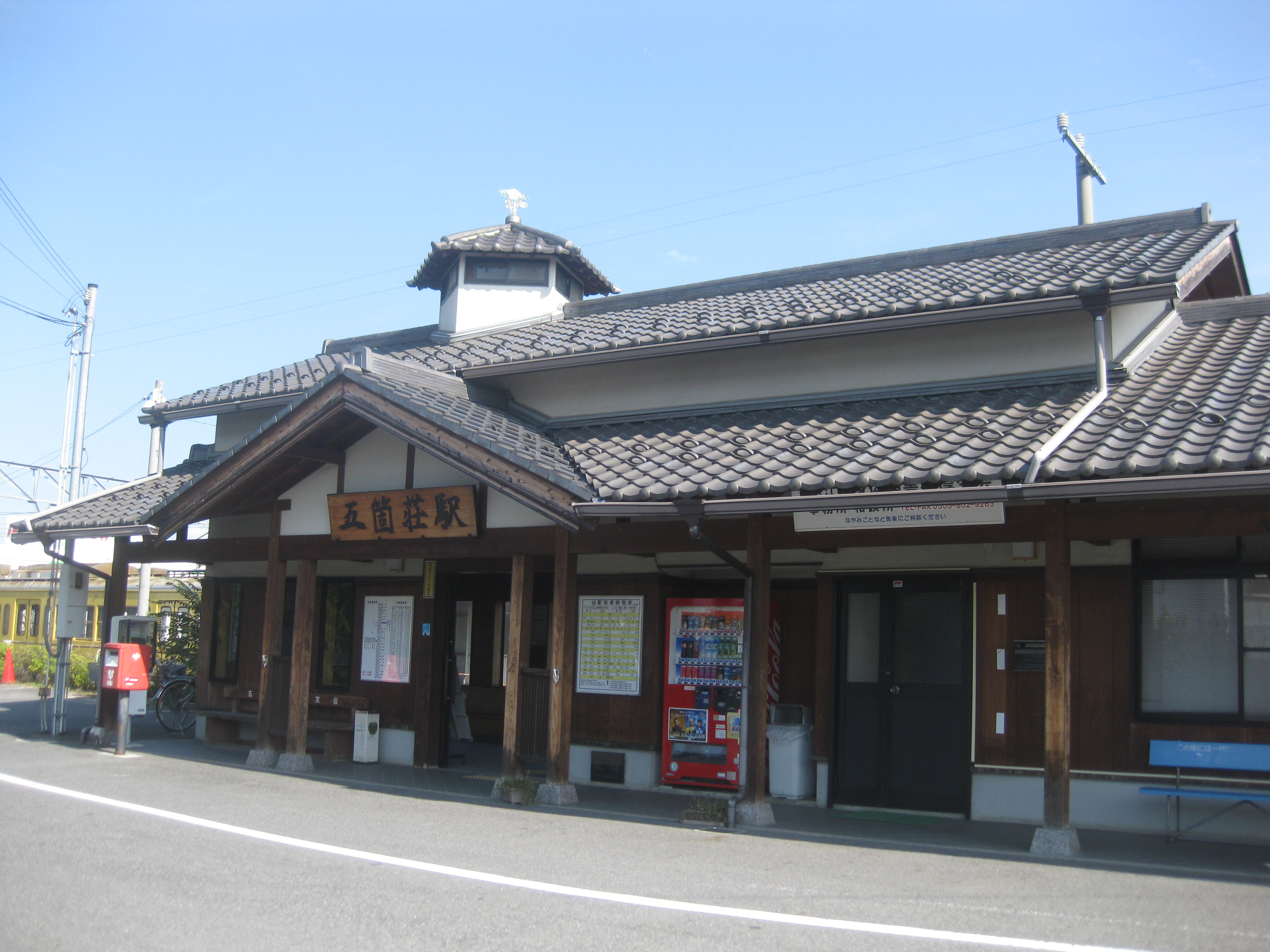
- Gokashō Station, 2011

General information
- Location: Gokashō-obata-chō, Higashiōmi-shi, Shiga-ken 529-1422; Japan
- Coordinates: 35.1546°N 136.1970°E
- Operator: Ohmi Railway
- Line: ■ Ohmi Railway Main Line
- Distance: 20.9 km from Maibara
- Platforms: 2 side platforms

Other information
- Station code: OR13
- Website: Official website

History
- Opened: March 19, 1899
- Former names: Obata (until 1910)

Passengers
- FY2019: 84 daily
Location
- Location within Shiga Prefecture Location within Japan

Gokashō Station (五箇荘駅, Gokashō-eki) is a passenger railway station in located in the city of Higashiōmi, Shiga Prefecture, Japan, operated by the private railway operator Ohmi Railway. The Tōkaidō Shinkansen passes over just south of Gokashō Station.

== Lines ==
Gokashō Station is served by the Ohmi Railway Main Line, and is located 20.9 rail kilometers from the terminus of the line at Maibara Station.

== Station layout ==
The station consists of two unnumbered side platforms connected to the station building by a level crossing. The station building also serves as the local community center, and is unattended.

== Platforms ==
■ Main Line	for Hikone and Maibara
■ Main Line	for Yokaichi, Kibukawa and Omi-Hachiman

■ Rail siding	Not for passengers (loading place of track ballast)

== Adjacent stations ==
«	Service	»
Ohmi Railway Main Line
Rapid: Does not stop at this station
Echigawa	Local	Kawabe-no-mori

== History ==
Gokashō Station was opened on March 19, 1899, as Obata Station (小幡駅, Obata-eki) . It was relocated 200 meters to the south and renamed to its present name on January 1, 1900.. The station building was reconstructed in 2000.

== Passenger statistics ==
In fiscal 2019, the station was used by an average of 84 passengers daily (boarding passengers only).

== Surroundings ==
- Higashiomi City Hall Gokashō Branch
- Higashiomi City Gokashō Welfare Center
- Higashiomi City Gokashō Health Center
- Higashiomi Municipal Gokashō Junior High School

== See also ==
- List of railway stations in Japan
