= Toyosato Station (Shiga) =

Railway station in Toyosato, Shiga Prefecture, Japan

Toyosato Station 豊郷駅
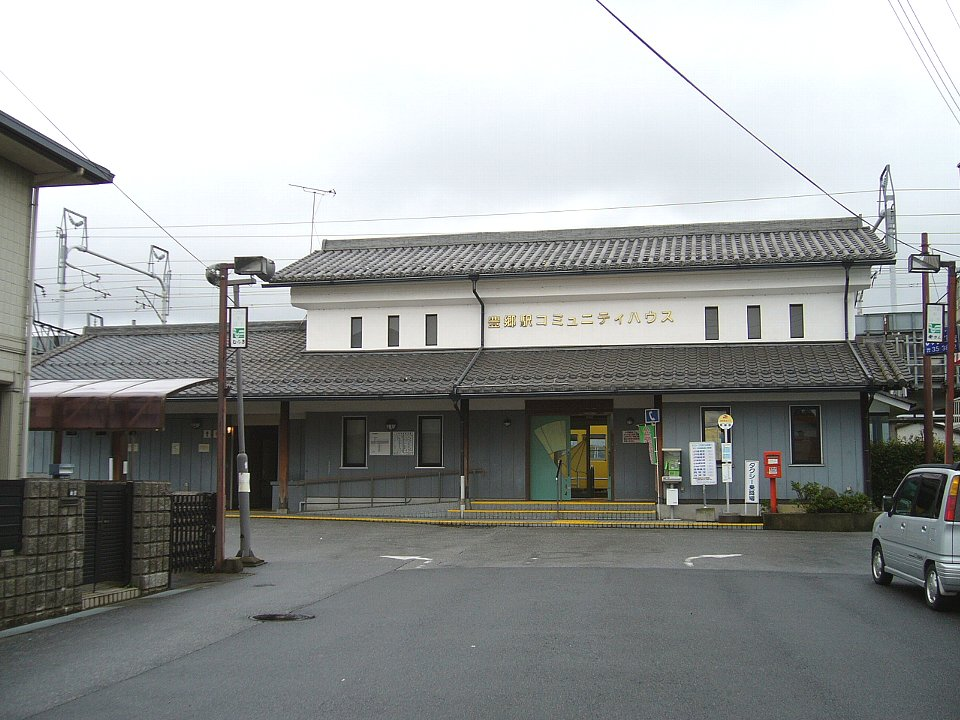
- Toyosato Station, October 2006

General information
- Location: Hachime, Toyosato-chō, Inukami-gun, Shiga-ken 529-1168; Japan
- Coordinates: 35°11′52″N 136°13′51″E
- Operator: Ohmi Railway
- Line: ■ Ohmi Railway Main Line
- Distance: 15.0 km from Maibara
- Platforms: 2 side platforms

Other information
- Station code: OR11
- Website: Official website

History
- Opened: March 19, 1899

Passengers
- FY2015: 215 daily
Location
- Location within Shiga Prefecture Location within Japan

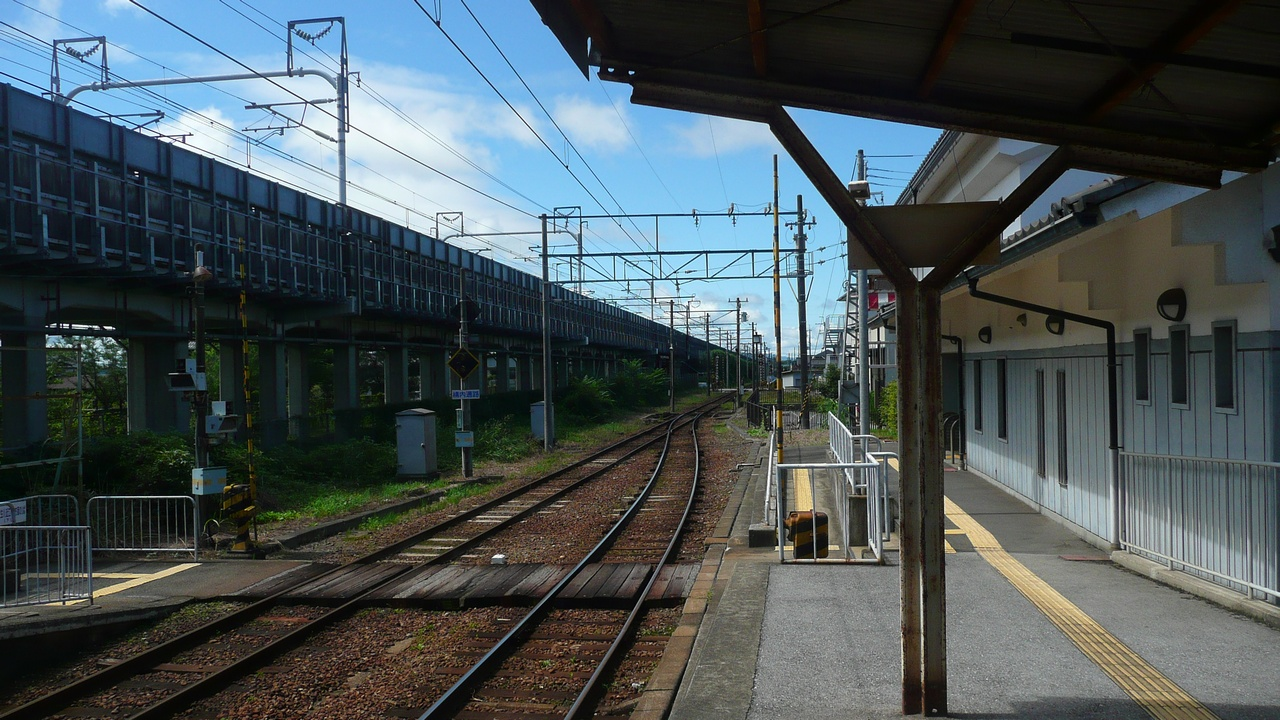
Platform of Toyosato Station

Toyosato Station (豊郷駅, Toyosato-eki) is a passenger railway station in located in the town of Toyosato, Shiga Prefecture, Japan, operated by the private railway operator Ohmi Railway.

== Lines ==
Toyosato Station is served by the Ohmi Railway Main Line, and is located 15.0 rail kilometers from the terminus of the line at Maibara Station.

== Station layout ==
The station consists of two unnumbered side platforms connected to the station building by a level crossing. The station is unattended.

== Platforms ==
opposite side	■ Main Line	for Hikone and Maibara
station side	■ Main Line	for Yokaichi, Kibukawa and Ōmi-Hachiman

== Adjacent stations ==
«	Service	»
Ohmi Railway Main Line
Amago	Local	Echigawa
Rapid: Does not stop at this station

== History ==
Toyosato Station was opened as a temporary stop on March 19, 1899 on land donated by local magnate Itō Chūbei. A station building was completed on April 14, 1906 and the station raised to a passenger station on the Ohmi Railway. Cargo handling was abolished in October 1972. The station building was reconstructed in 1996.

== Surroundings ==
- Toyosato Town Hall
- Toyosato Elementary School, known for being used in the anime K-On!
- Nakasendō
- Tōkaidō Shinkansen

== See also ==
- List of railway stations in Japan
