= Echigawa Station =

Railway station in Aishō, Shiga Prefecture, Japan

Echigawa Station 愛知川駅
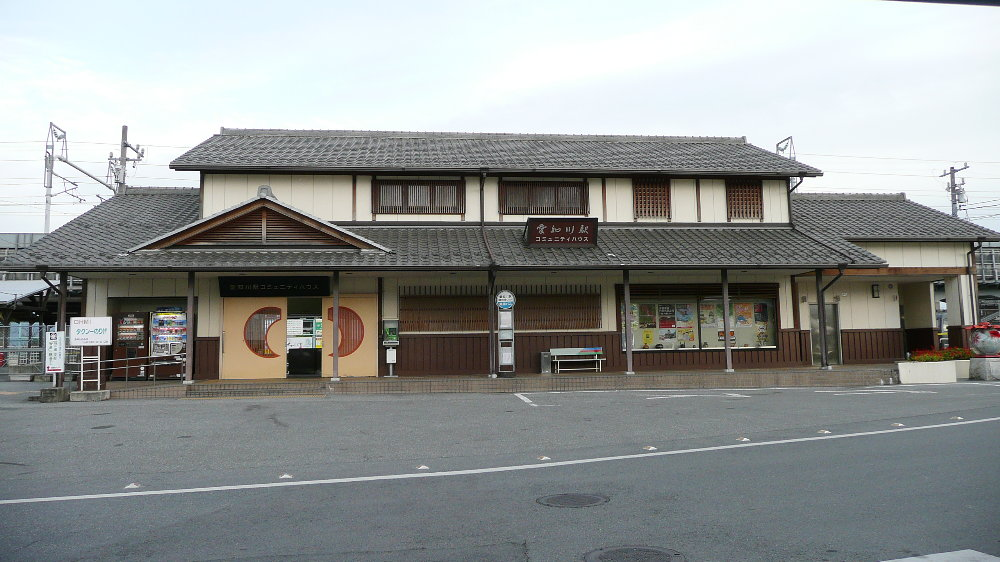
- Echigawa Station, October 2006

General information
- Location: 895 Ichi, Aishō-chō, Echi-gun, Shiga-ken 529-1313; Japan
- Coordinates: 35.1762°N 136.2133°E
- Operator: Ohmi Railway
- Line: ■ Ohmi Railway Main Line
- Distance: 17.9 km from Maibara
- Platforms: 2 side platforms

Other information
- Station code: OR12
- Website: Official website

History
- Opened: June 11, 1898

Passengers
- FY2015: 593 daily
Location
- Location within Shiga Prefecture Location within Japan

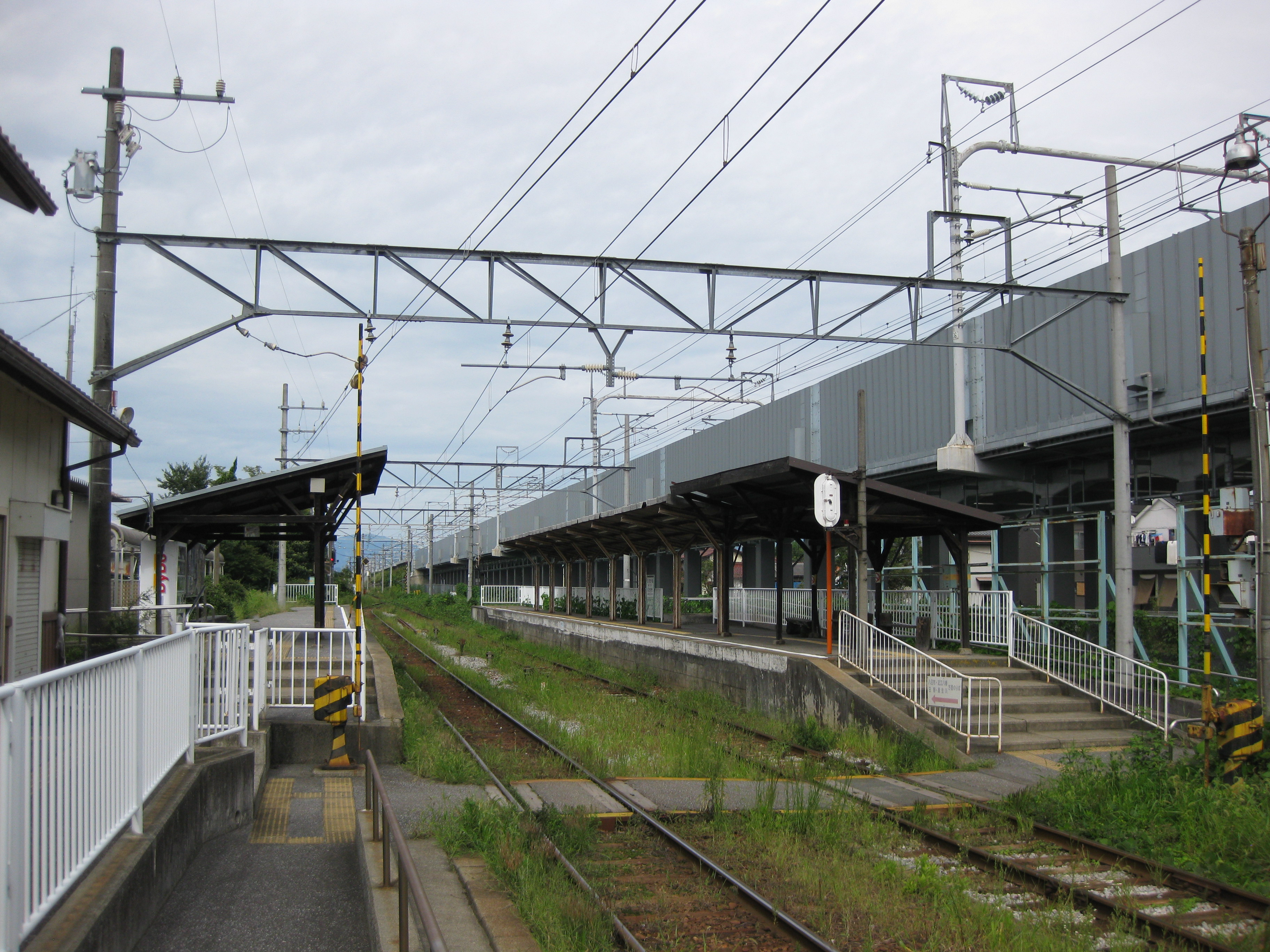
View of the railway track

Echigawa Station (愛知川駅, Echigawa-eki) is a passenger railway station in located in the town of Aishō, Shiga Prefecture, Japan, operated by the private railway operator Ohmi Railway.

== Lines ==
Echigawa Station is served by the Ohmi Railway Main Line, and is located 17.9 rail kilometers from the terminus of the line at Maibara Station.

== Station layout ==
The station consists of two unnumbered side platforms connected to the station building by a level crossing. The station building also serves as the local community center, and is unattended.

== Platforms ==
| ■ Main Line | for Yokaichi, Kibukawa and Ōmi-Hachiman |
| ■ Main Line | for Hikone and Maibara |

== Adjacent stations ==
| « | Service | » |
Ohmi Railway Main Line
Rapid: Does not stop at this station
| Toyosato | Local | Gokashō |

== History ==
Echigawa Station was opened on June 11, 1898. The station building was reconstructed in 2000.

== Surroundings ==
- Aishō Town Hall
- Aishō Municipal Eichigawa Library
- Aishō Municipal Aishō Junior High School
- Shiga Prefectural Echi High School
- Nakasendō Echigawa-juku
- Tōkaidō Shinkansen

== See also ==
- List of railway stations in Japan
