= Hirata =

Hirata may refer to:

== Places ==
- Hirata, Fukushima, village in Fukushima Prefecture, Japan
- Hirata, Gifu, former town in Gifu Prefecture, Japan
- Hirata, Shimane, former city in Shimane Prefecture, Japan
- Hirata, Yamagata, former town in Yamagata Prefecture, Japan

== Other uses ==
- Hirata (surname)
- Hirata Station (disambiguation), multiple train stations in Japan
