= Musa Station (Shiga) =

Railway station in Ōmihachiman, Shiga Prefecture, Japan

Musa Station 武佐駅
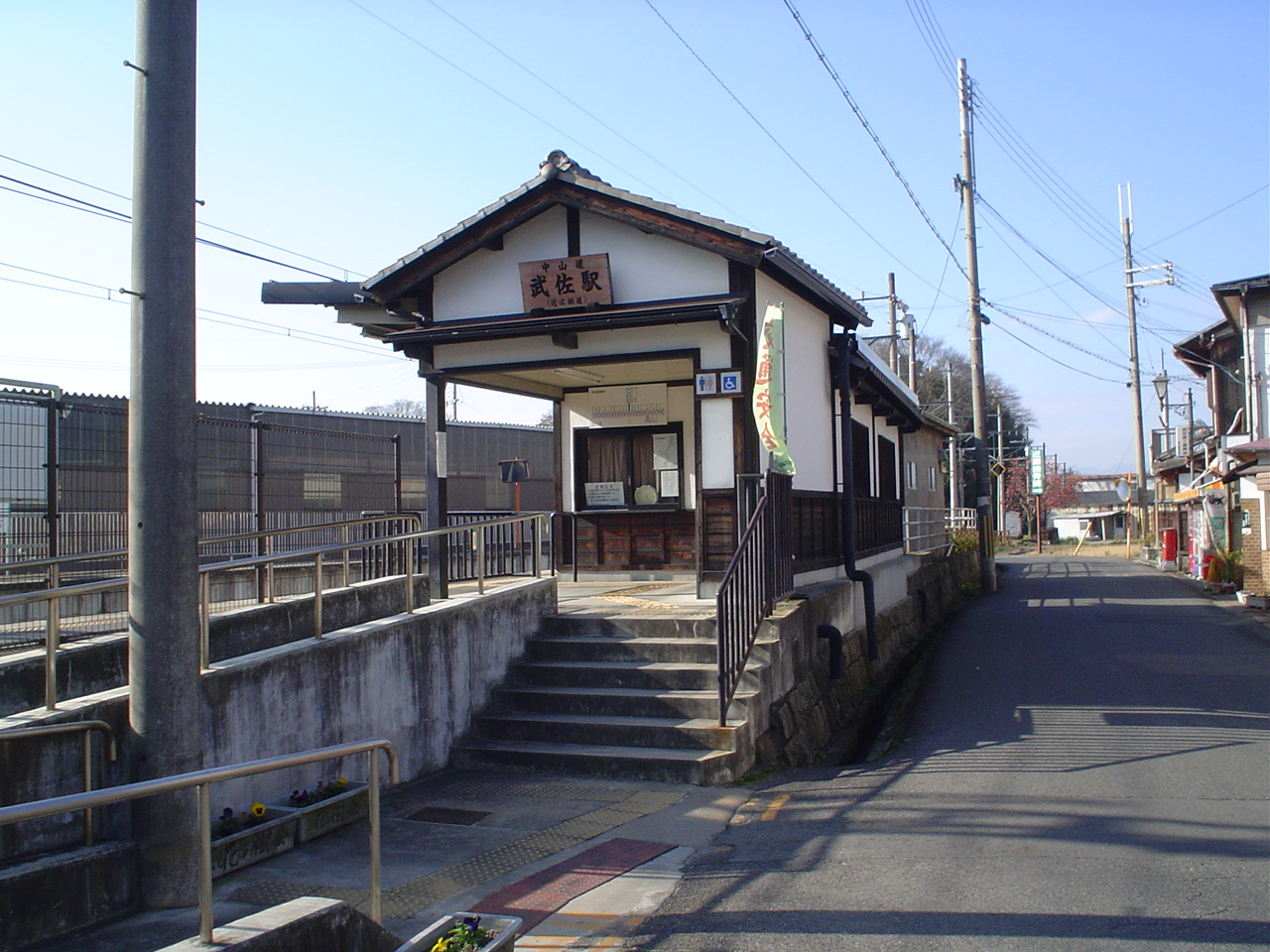
- Musa Station, December 2008

General information
- Location: 55-3 Chokoji-cho, Ōmihachiman-shi, Shiga-ken 523-0013; Japan
- Coordinates: 35°06′54″N 136°07′50″E
- Operator: Ohmi Railway
- Line: ■ Ohmi Railway Yōkaichi Line
- Distance: 6.5 km from Yōkaichi
- Platforms: 2 side platforms

Other information
- Station code: OR20
- Website: Official website

History
- Opened: December 29, 1913

Passengers
- FY2017: 175 daily
Location
- Location within Shiga Prefecture Location within Japan

Musa Station (武佐駅, Musa-eki) is a passenger railway station in located in the city of Ōmihachiman, Shiga Prefecture, Japan, operated by the private railway operator Ohmi Railway.

== Lines ==
Musa Station is served by the Ohmi Railway Yōkaichi Line, and is located 6.5 rail kilometers from the terminus of the line at Yōkaichi Station.

== Station layout ==
The station consists of two unnumbered side platforms connected to the station building by a level crossing. The station is unattended.

== Platforms ==
■ Yōkaichi Line	for Yōkaichi
■ Yōkaichi Line	for Omi-Hachiman

== Adjacent stations ==
«	Service	»
Ohmi Railway Yōkaichi Line
Yōkaichi	Rapid	Ōmi-Hachiman
Hirata	Local	Ōmi-Hachiman

== History ==
Musa Station was opened on December 29, 1913.

== Passenger statistics ==
In fiscal 2017, the station was used by an average of 175 passengers daily (boarding passengers only).

== Surroundings ==
- Ōmihachiman City Musa Community Center
- Ōmihachiman City Musa Elementary School
- Japan National Route 8
- Japan National Route 421
- Nakasendo Musa-juku

== See also ==
- List of railway stations in Japan
