= Kawabe-no-mori Station =

Railway station in Higashiōmi, Shiga Prefecture, Japan

Kawabe-no-mori Station 河辺の森駅
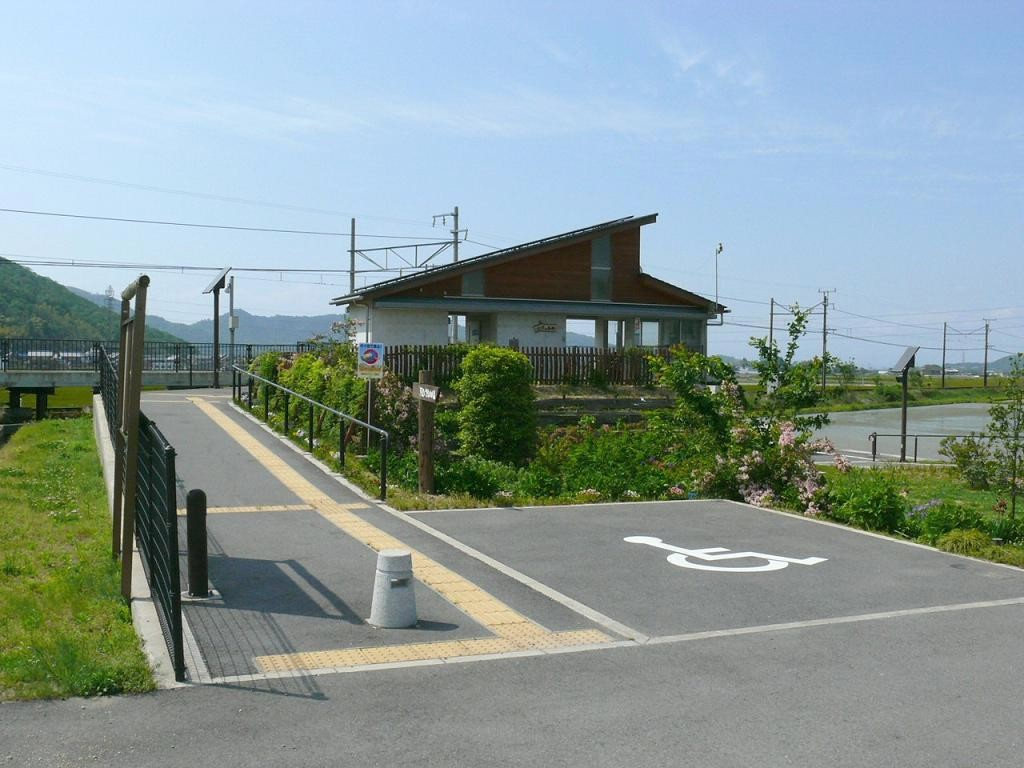
- Kawabe-no-mori Station, May 2007

General information
- Location: 1241-2 Tatebeshimono-chō, Higashiōmi-shi, Shiga-ken 527-0001; Japan
- Coordinates: 35.1356°N 136.1962°E
- Operator: Ohmi Railway
- Line: ■ Ohmi Railway Main Line
- Distance: 23.0 km from Maibara
- Platforms: 1 side platform

Other information
- Status: unstaffed
- Station code: OR14
- Website: Official website

History
- Opened: March 13, 2004

Passengers
- FY2019: 14 daily
Location
- Location within Shiga Prefecture Location within Japan

Kawabe-no-mori Station (河辺の森駅, Kawabe-no-mori-eki) is a passenger railway station in located in the city of Higashiōmi, Shiga Prefecture, Japan, operated by the private railway operator Ohmi Railway.

== Lines ==
Kawabe-no-mori Station is served by the Ohmi Railway Main Line, and is located 23.0 rail kilometers from the terminus of the line at Maibara Station.

== Station layout ==
The station consists of one side platform serving a single bi-directional track. The station is unattended.

== Platforms ==
■ Main Line	for Hikone and Maibara for Yokaichi, Kibukawa and Omi-Hachiman

== Adjacent stations ==
«	Service	»
Ohmi Railway Main Line
Rapid: Does not stop at this station
Gokashō	Local	Yōkaichi

== History ==
Kawabe-no-mori Station was opened on March 13, 2004.

== Passenger statistics ==
In fiscal 2019, the station was used by an average of 14 passengers daily (boarding passengers only).

== Surroundings ==
- Kawabe-no-mori Bio-Park

== See also ==
- List of railway stations in Japan
