= Shin-Yōkaichi Station =

Railway station in Higashiōmi, Shiga Prefecture, Japan

Shin-Yōkaichi Station 新八日市駅
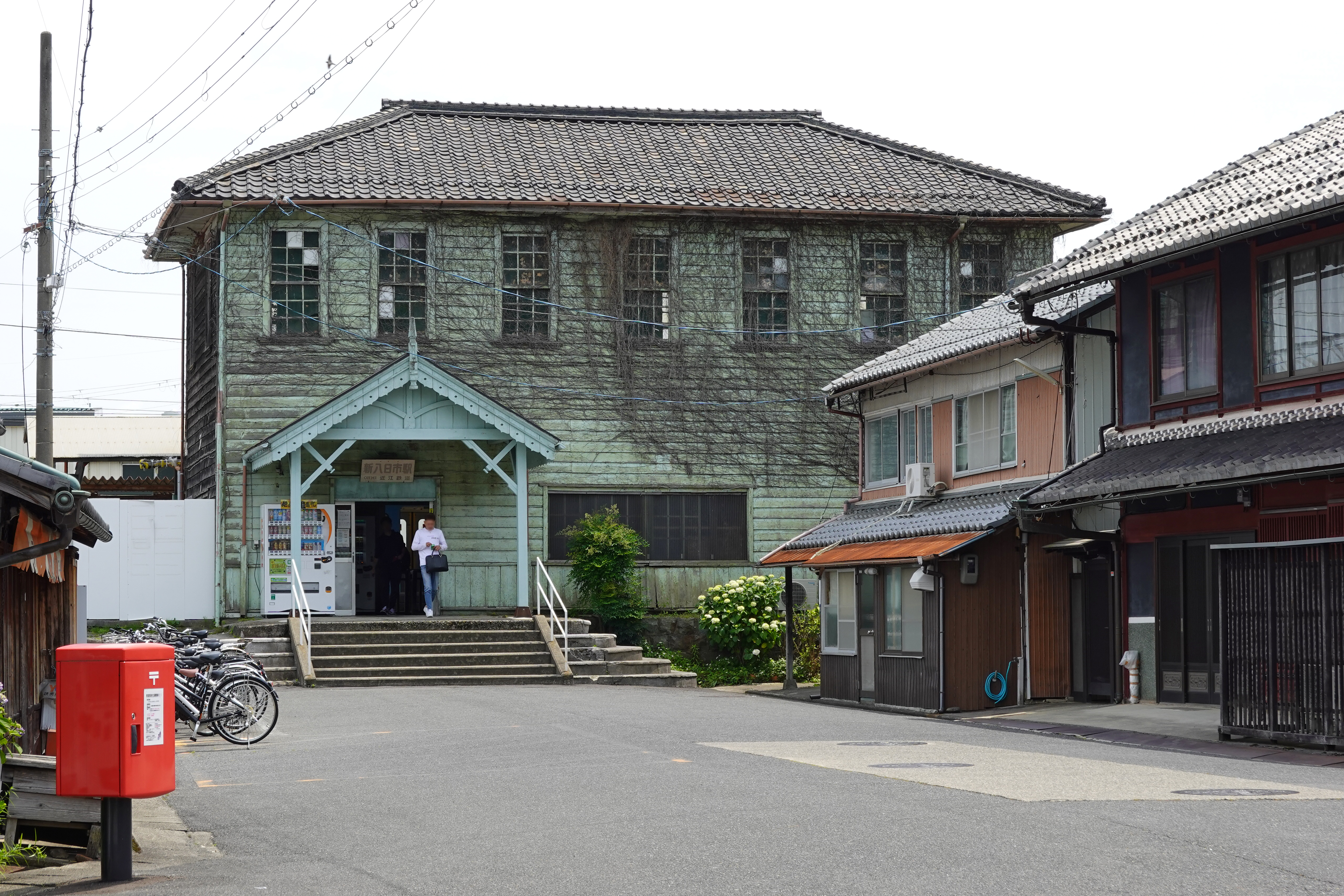
- Shin-Yōkaichi Station, July 2003

General information
- Location: 2-10 Yōkaichishimizu, Higashiōmi-shi, Shiga-ken 27-0018; Japan
- Coordinates: 35.1105°N 136.1911°E
- Operator: Ohmi Railway
- Line: ■ Ohmi Railway Yōkaichi Line
- Distance: 0.7 km from Yōkaichi
- Platforms: 2 side platforms

Other information
- Station code: OR16
- Website: Official website

History
- Opened: December 29, 1913
- Former names: Yōkaichiguchi (until 1919)

Passengers
- FY2019: 501 daily
Location
- Location within Shiga Prefecture Location within Japan

Shin-Yōkaichi Station (新八日市駅, Shin-Yōkaichi-eki) is a passenger railway station in located in the city of Higashiōmi, Shiga Prefecture, Japan, operated by the private railway operator Ohmi Railway.

== Lines ==
Shin-Yōkaichi Station is served by the Ohmi Railway Yōkaichi Line, and is located 0.7 rail kilometers from the terminus of the line at Yōkaichi Station.

== Station layout ==
The station consists of two unnumbered side platforms connected to the station building by a level crossing. The station is unattended.

== Platforms ==
■ Yōkaichi Line	for Yōkaichi
■ Yōkaichi Line	for Omi-Hachiman

== Adjacent stations ==
«	Service	»
Ohmi Railway Yōkaichi Line
Rapid: Does not stop at this station
Yōkaichi	Local	Tarō Bogū-mae

== History ==
Shin-Yōkaichi Station was opened on December 29, 1913 as Yōkaichiguchi Station (八日市口駅, Yōkaichiguchi-eki) . It was renamed to its present name on July 1, 1919. The station building was built in 1922. The second floor of the station building was once used as the head office of the Konan Railway and Yokaichi Railway, which were the predecessors of the Yokaichi Line.

== Passenger statistics ==
In fiscal 2019, the station was used by an average of 501 passengers daily (boarding passengers only).

== Surroundings ==
- Yōkaichi Post Office
- Japan National Route 421

== See also ==
- List of railway stations in Japan
