= Hirata Station (Shiga) =

Railway station in Higashiōmi, Shiga Prefecture, Japan

Hirata Station 平田駅
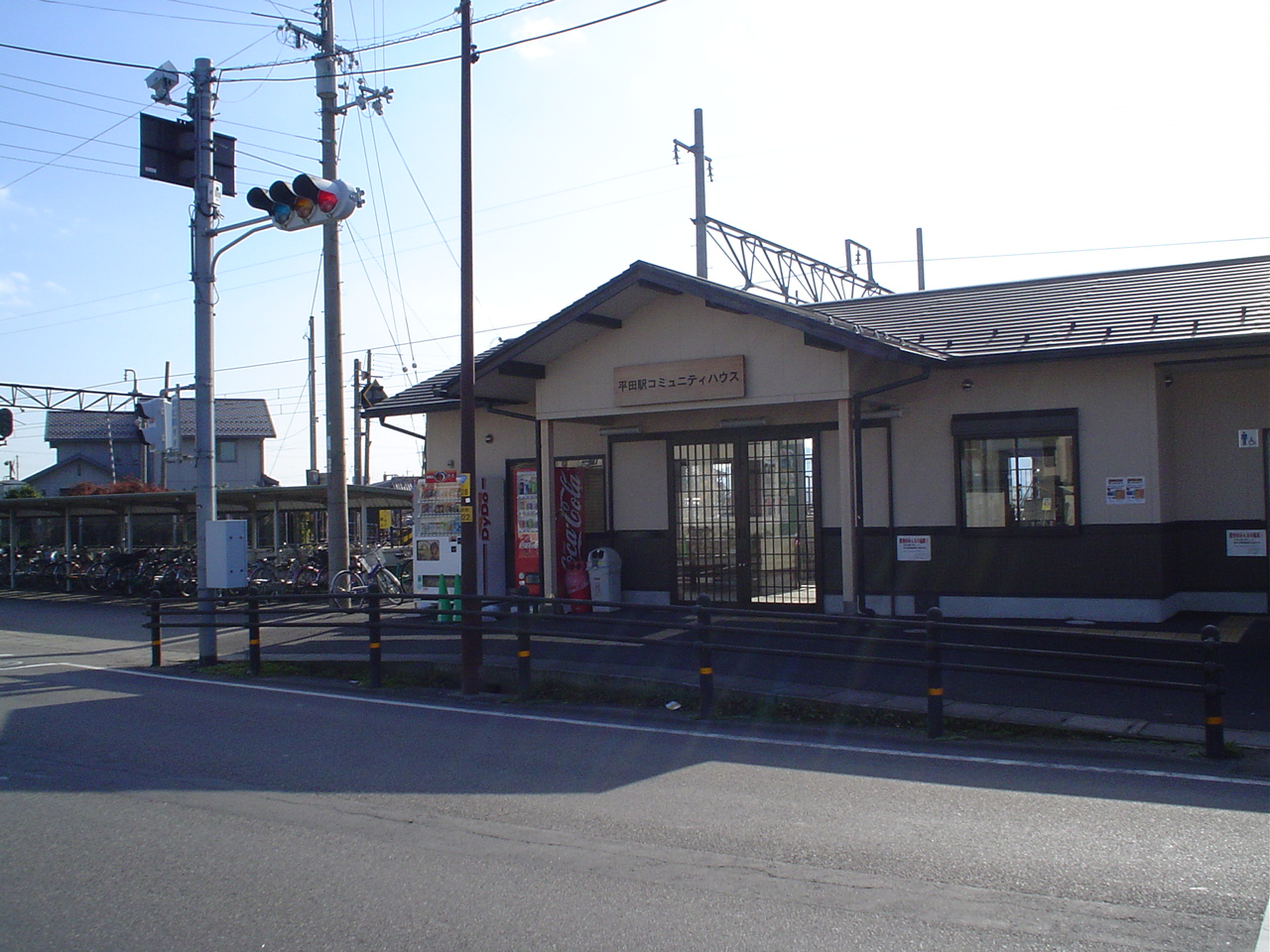
- Hirata Station, December, 2008

General information
- Location: 121-2 Hirata-chō, Higashiōmi-shi, Shiga-ken 527-0087; Japan
- Coordinates: 35°06′37″N 136°08′48″E
- Operator: Ohmi Railway
- Line: ■ Ohmi Railway Yōkaichi Line
- Distance: 5.0 km from Yōkaichi
- Platforms: 2 side platforms

Other information
- Station code: OR19
- Website: Official website

History
- Opened: December 29, 1913

Passengers
- FY2019: 154 daily
Location
- Location within Shiga Prefecture Location within Japan

Hirata Station (平田駅, Hirata-eki) is a passenger railway station in located in the city of Higashiōmi, Shiga Prefecture, Japan, operated by the private railway operator Ohmi Railway.

== Lines ==
Hirata Station is served by the Ohmi Railway Yōkaichi Line, and is located 5.0 rail kilometers from the terminus of the line at Yōkaichi Station.

== Station layout ==
The station consists of two unnumbered side platforms connected to the station building by a level crossing. The station is staffed and also serves as the local community center.

== Platforms ==
■ Yōkaichi Line	for Yōkaichi
■ Yōkaichi Line	for Omi-Hachiman

== Adjacent stations ==
«	Service	»
Ohmi Railway Yōkaichi Line
Rapid: Does not stop at this station
Ichinobe	Local	Musa

== History ==
Hirata Station was opened on December 29, 1913. The station building was rebuilt in 2006.

== Passenger statistics ==
In fiscal 2019, the station was used by an average of 154 passengers daily (boarding passengers only).

== Surroundings ==
- Shiga Prefectural Yokaichi School for the Disabled

== See also ==
- List of railway stations in Japan
