= Hirata Station =

Hirata Station is the name of three train stations in Japan:

- Hirata Station (Kōchi)
- Hirata Station (Shiga)
- Hirata Station (Nagano)
