= Minami-Matsumoto Station =

Railway station in Matsumoto, Nagano Prefecture, Japan

SN05 Minami-Matsumoto Station 南松本駅
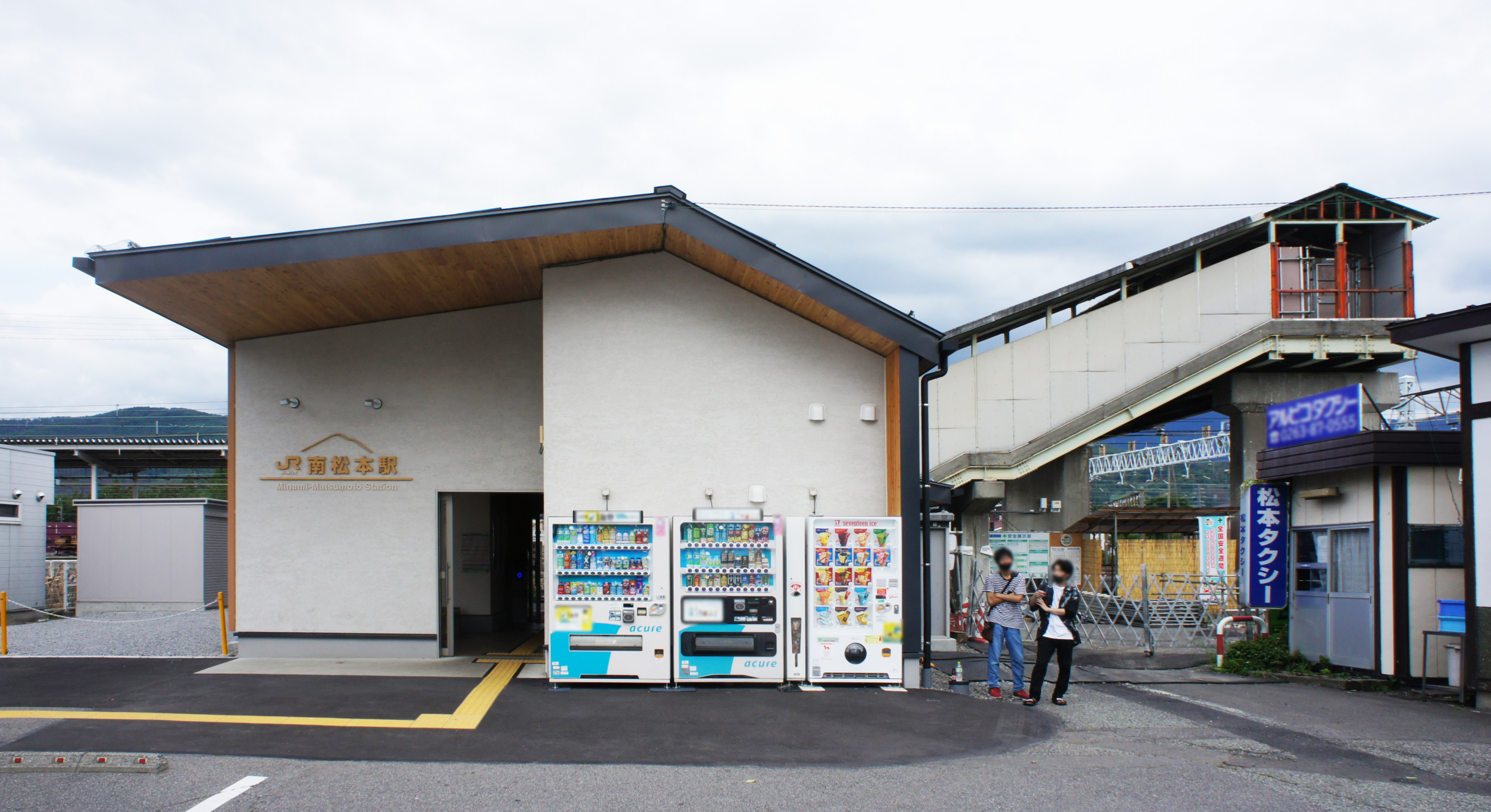
- Minami-Matsumoto Station, July 2021

General information
- Location: 1-1 Idegawa-machi, Matsumoto-shi, Nagano-ken 390-0826; Japan
- Coordinates: 36.2100°N 137.9695°E
- Elevation: 594.6 meters
- Operator: East Japan Railway Company; Japan Freight Railway Company
- Line: Shinonoi Line
- Distance: 10.9 km from Shiojiri
- Platforms: 1 island platform

Other information
- Status: Staffed (Midori no Madoguchi)
- Website: Official website

History
- Opened: 1 September 1944

Passengers
- FY2015: 1584 (daily)

Services
Preceding station	JR East	Following station
Hirata SN04 towards Shiojiri	Shinonoi Line Rapid; Local & Rapid Misuzu	Matsumoto SN06 towards Shinonoi
Location
- Location within Nagano Prefecture Location within Japan

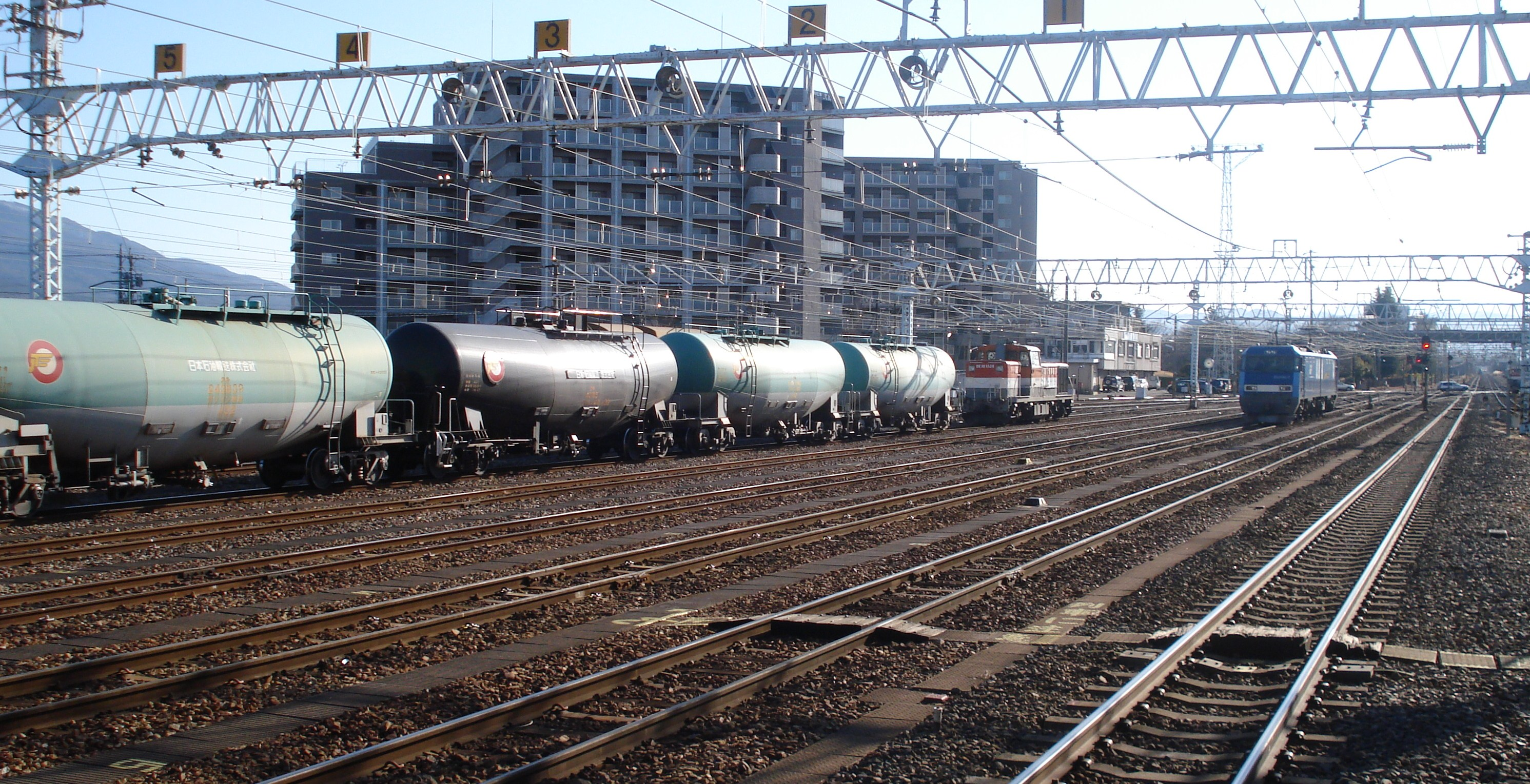
Freight tracks of Minami-Matsumoto Station

Minami-Matsumoto Station (南松本駅, Minami-Matsumoto-eki) is a train station in the city of Matsumoto, Nagano Prefecture, Japan, operated by East Japan Railway Company (JR East)., with a freight terminal operated by the Japan Freight Railway Company.

== Lines ==
Minami-Matsumoto Station is served by the Shinonoi Line and is 10.9 kilometers from the terminus of the line at Shiojiri Station.Many trains of the Chūō Main Line continue past the nominal intermediate terminus of the line at Shiojiri and continue on to Matsumoto via this station.

== Station layout ==
The station consists of one ground-level island platform, connected to the station building by a footbridge. The station has a Midori no Madoguchi staffed ticket office.

=== Platforms ===
1	■ Shinonoi Line	for Matsumoto and Nagano
2	■ Shinonoi Line	for Shiojiri and Kami-Suwa

== History ==
Minami-Matumoto Station opened on 1 September 1944. With the privatization of Japanese National Railways (JNR) on 1 April 1987, the station came under the control of JR East. Station numbering introduced on the line from February 2025, with the station being assigned number SN05.

== Passenger statistics ==
In fiscal 2015, the station was used by an average of 1584 passengers daily (boarding passengers only).

== Surrounding area ==
- Minami-Matsumoto Post Office

== See also ==
- List of railway stations in Japan
