= Shigeo Hirose =

Japanese academic

Shigeo Hirose (広瀬 茂男, Hirose Shigeo) (born 1947 in Tokyo) is a pioneer of robotics technology and a professor at the Tokyo Institute of Technology.

Born in Tokyo and attending Hibiya High School, he graduated from Yokohama National University in 1971 and received a Ph.D. from Tokyo Institute of Technology in 1976 where he later took professorship.

His works includes designs for robots capable of various types of movement such as walking, crawling, swimming and slithering. Specific designs include a "ninja-robot" capable of climbing buildings and a seven-ton robot capable of climbing mountainous slopes with the aim of installing bolts in the ground so as to prevent landslides. Hirose is also involved in work with the United Nations to develop a remotely controlled robot capable of clearing landmines.

== Positions held ==
- 1976–1979 Research Associate
- 1979–1992 Associate Professor
- 1992–2013 Professor, Tokyo Institute of Technology
- 2002– Honorary Professor, Shengyang Institute of Technology, Chinese Academy of Sciences
- Fellow of the Japan Society of Mechanical Engineers
- 2003– Fellow of the Institute of Electrical and Electronics Engineers

== Books ==
1. “Snake Inspired Robots” (Kogyo-chosakai Publishing Co. Ltd., 1987, in Japanese)
2. “Robotics” (Shokabo Publishing Co. Ltd., 1987, 1996 revised edition, in Japanese)
3. “Biologically Inspired Robots” (Oxford University Press, 1993).

== Awards ==
Hirose has been awarded about thirty academic prizes including:

1. Medal with Purple Ribbon in spring 2006.
2. The first Pioneer in Robotics and Automation Award in 1999, Best Conference Paper Award in 1995, 2003 Distinguished Lecturers, all from IEEE Robotics and Automation Society.
3. Award of Merits from IFToMM (International Federation for the Promotion of Mechanism and Machine Science) in 2004
4. The Joseph Engelberger Robotics Award from Robotic Industries Association in 2009
5. Award of Ministry of Education, Culture, Sports, Science and Technology in 2001.
6. Creative Engineering Award from Tokyo Tech Graduate School of Engineering in 2008.
7. Outstanding Paper Awards in 1976, 1983 and 1992, Outstanding Publishing Award in 1989, all from the Society of Instrument and Control Engineers.
8. Hatakeyama Award in 1971, Certificate of Merit for Outstanding Contribution in 1997, both from the Japanese Society of Mechanical Engineers (JSME)
9. ROBOMEC Awards in 1994, 2000 and 2003. Certificate of Merit for Outstanding Contribution in 1998, 2000 and 2008, all form JSME Robotics and Mechatronics
10. Journal of Robotics and Mechatronics Award in 2009.
11. Outstanding Paper Awards in 1987, 1993 and 2002, Outstanding Technical Paper Award in 1992, 2000, and 10th anniversary paper award in 1993, all from the Robotics Society of Japan
12. The Most Interesting Reading Award in 1999 from Japan Society for Design Engineering
13. JIRA Award in 1990 and Best Paper Award in 1992 both from the Japan Industrial Robot Association
14. Outstanding Publishing Awards in 1989, 1994 and outstanding invention award in 2001 all from Tejima Seiichi Commemorative Foundation
15. Carlos Ghosn Award in 2008
16. Fire Fighter Agency Award in 2004
17. Nikkan-Kogyo-Shinbun Outstanding Publishing Award in 1988
18. Outstanding Paper Award in 1994 from Foundation for Promotion of Advanced Automation Technology
19. Outstanding Paper Award in 2000 from FANUC FA and Robot Foundation
20. Good Design Award in 2002 and 2006
21. Acknowledgments of Outstanding Invention in 1990 and 1993 from the Science and Technology Agency
22. IEEE Robotics and Automation Technical Field Award (TFA) 2014

== See also ==
- Robotics
