= Kuniji Toda =

Japanese politician (1934–2023)

- 戸田 邦司

Member of the House of Councillors
- In office 23 July 1995 – 29 July 2001
- Constituency: National PR

Personal details
- Born: 18 November 1934 Iwaki, Fukushima, Japan
- Died: 4 September 2023 (aged 88)
- Party: Liberal
- Other political affiliations: New Frontier (1995–1998)
- Education: Yokohama National University
- Occupation: Engineer

Kuniji Toda (Japanese: 戸田邦司 Toda Kuniji; 18 November 1934 – 4 September 2023) was a Japanese engineer and politician. A member of the New Frontier Party and later the Liberal Party, he served in the House of Councillors from 1995 to 2001.

Toda died on 4 September 2023, at the age of 88.
