= Hirata (surname) =

Hirata (written: 平田 lit. "peaceful rice paddy") is a Japanese surname. Notable people with the surname include:

- Akihiko Hirata (平田 昭彦, 1927–1984), Japanese actor
- Akihisa Hirata (平田 明久, born 1963), Japanese rower
- Hirata Atsutane (平田 篤胤, 1776–1843), Japanese scholar
- Hirata Hide (平田 ヒデ, 1902–1978), Japanese politician
- Hiroaki Hirata (平田 広明, born 1963), Japanese voice actor
- Hiromi Hirata (平田 宏美, born 1978), Japanese singer and voice actress
- Hiroshi Hirata (平田 弘史, 1937–2021), Japanese manga artist
- Itsuki Hirata (平田 樹,, born 1999), Japanese mixed martial artist
- Junji Hirata (平田 淳嗣, born 1956), Japanese professional wrestler
- Kazuki Hirata (平田 一喜, born 1987), Japanese professional wrestler
- Kenji Hirata (平田 健二, born 1944), Japanese politician
- Koichi Hirata (平田 耕一, born 1948), Japanese politician
- Mana Hirata (平田 真菜, born 1985), Japanese voice actress
- Mitsuru Hirata (平田 満, born 1953), Japanese actor
- Momoko Hirata (平田 桃子, born 1985), Japanese ballerina
- Noritoshi Hirata (平田 倫敏, born 1958), Japanese gymnast
- Noriyasu Hirata (平田 典靖, born 1983), Japanese badminton player
- Ryosuke Hirata (平田 良介, born 1988), Japanese baseball player
- Takeo Hirata (平田 竹男, born 1960), Japanese academic
- Hirata Tosuke (平田 東助, 1849–1925), Japanese politician
- Yoshimasa Hirata (平田 義正, 1915–2000), Japanese chemist
- Yuka Hirata (平田 裕香, born 1983), Japanese actress, voice actress and gravure idol

== Other people ==
- Andrea Hirata, Indonesian writer
- Bruno Hirata (born 1988), Brazilian baseball player
- Gilberto Hirata (born 1953), Mexican politician
