= Masatoshi Muto =

Japanese diplomat (born 1948)

- 武藤正敏

Japanese Ambassador to South Korea
- In office August 5, 2010 – October 2012
- Preceded by: Toshinori Shigeya
- Succeeded by: Hiroki Bessho

Japanese Ambassador to Kuwait
- In office 2007–2010
- Preceded by: Otsuki Masamitsu
- Succeeded by: Hiromi Ogizo

Japanese Consul-General in Honolulu
- In office 2002–2005
- Preceded by: Shibuya Rin
- Succeeded by: Iwao Ikuo

Personal details
- Born: December 18, 1948 (age 77) Tokyo, Japan
- Education: Yokohama National University, Harvard University (Master)

Masatoshi Muto (武藤 正敏, Mutō Masatoshi; born December 18, 1948) is a Japanese diplomatic analyst and former diplomat who served as the Japanese ambassador to South Korea from 2010 to 2012. He also served as the Japanese ambassador to Kuwait in the late 2000s and was the Japanese consul-general in Hawaii in the early 2000s. Starting in 2015, he is also an author.

== Early life and education ==
Muto was born in the Setagaya ward of Tokyo and graduated from Yokohama National University in 1972, where he studied economics. Muto also studied Korean and is reportedly fluent in the language. In 1975, he received a master's degree from the graduate school of Harvard University.

== Career ==
In 2005, Muto became an envoy extraordinary and minister plenipotentiary to South Korea.

During the period from 2007 to 2010, Muto worked as Japanese Ambassador to Kuwait.

In August 2010, Muto became the Japanese ambassador to South Korea. He was briefly recalled by the Japanese government in protest of an August 2012 visit by the South Korean president to the Liancourt Rocks, which Japan claims but South Korea controls and administers. He eventually returned to his post. Muto's successor, Hiroki Bessho, was nominated in September 2012, and Muto left the post in October 2012. Muto's posting to South Korea was his last official diplomatic position; he has since retired from diplomatic work and now works as a diplomatic analyst and critic.

== Controversy ==
In December 2016, Muto said of Korean comfort women claiming that "there is no evidence of a forced emigration of comfort women".

In 2017, Muto published his third book 韓国人に生まれなくてよかった (English translation: Fortunately, I wasn't Born a Korean) that mainly focused on heavily criticizing Moon Jae-In as the recently then recently inaugurated president of South Korea but also criticizing various aspects of South Korea as a whole. In the book, he described Moon as "the worst president ever elected in South Korea" and accused him of potentially using "anti-Japan" policies to boost his popularity. Muto additionally called Moon a "pro-North Korean and anti-Japanese populist". He also claims Moon's "appeasement" policies toward North Korea would encourage North Korea's violence. He described Korean people as being swayed by "sentiment" rather than "logic". Talking of the then recent mass protests and impeachment of President Park Geun-hye as "an act explicitly showing the ugly face (of Koreans) who are swayed by sentiment than logic" and additionally claimed Park became a target due to her attempts to improve South Korea-Japan ties. Some Korean editorial writers considered the book as an "anti-Korean" book that is filled with anti-Korean sentiment. The book in Korea was also widely considered "anti-Korean". Muto defended the title and content of the books saying that it wasn't meant to slander Korea or Koreans but simply a criticism of the politics, society, and economy of South Korea.

In a 2019 interview, Muto heavily disagreed with South Korea's 2018 supreme court ruling where it ruled there is a liability of a Japanese company implicated in war crimes for compensation for forced labor mobilization: “The very fact that such a ruling could happen at this point is incomprehensible. There would never be a ruling like this in Japan”. Additionally in reaction to the court ruling he claimed of Korea's judiciary "There are many progressives in the judiciary, and it is said they are more likely to become judges…Therefore, there is a strong tendency for left-leaning decisions to be made." In the same interview when asked "Do you think of yourself as a person who hates Korea or as a person who is friendly toward the country?". Muto answered "Today, Koreans might see me as a Korea hater, but I have both love and hate for the country."

== Awards ==
- Order of merit (修好勲章光化章) from South Korean government, 2013

== Bibliography ==
- 日韓対立の真相. Goku books, 2015.
- 日本大使が徹底分析 韓国の大誤算. Goku books, 2016.
- 韓国人に生まれなくてよかった. Goku books, 2017. - warning about Moon Jae-in as a president who will destroy Japan–South Korea relations.
- 文在寅という災厄. Goku books, 2019. - proposing about how to confront President Moon Jae-in who is being isolated from international community.
- 文在寅の謀略 すべて見抜いた！. Goku books, 2020. - enumerating conspiracies of the dictator president and trying to reveal his aim.
