= Yokohama National University =

University located in Yokohama, Japan

Yokohama National University(YNU)
- 横浜国立大学
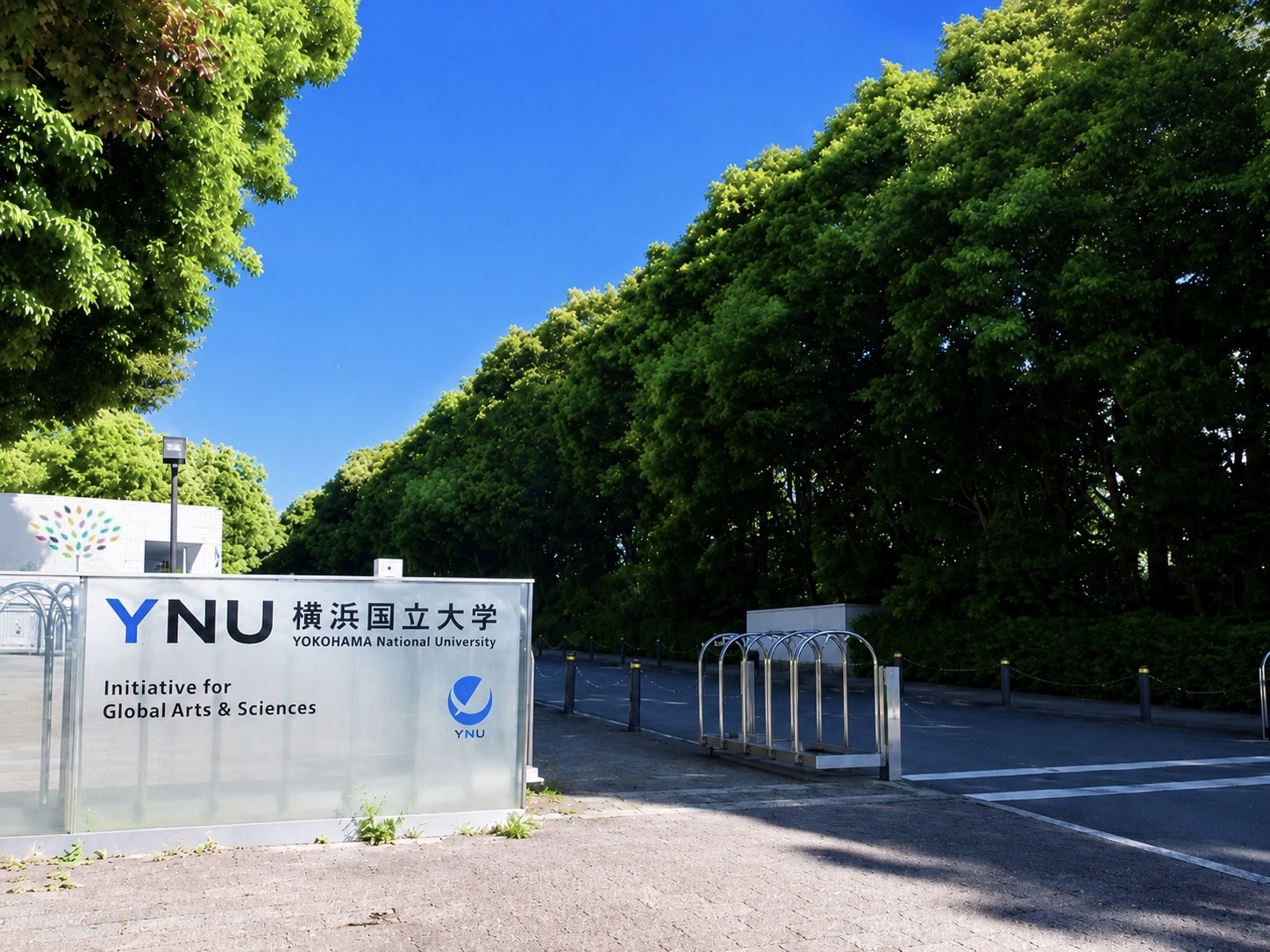
- Other name: Yokokoku
- Motto: Japanese: グローバルな学術の共創
- Motto in English: Initiative for Global Arts & Sciences
- Type: National
- Established: 1876 (chartered 1949)
- Affiliations: Port-City University League (PUL)
- President: Izuru Umehara
- Undergraduates: 7,298 as of 1 May 2020
- Postgraduates: 2,302 as of 1 May 2020
- Location: Yokohama, Kanagawa, Japan; 35°28′26″N 139°35′24″E
- Website: www.ynu.ac.jp

- Location in Kanagawa Prefecture

Yokohama National University (横浜国立大学, Yokohama Kokuritsu Daigaku), abbreviated to Yokohama Kokudai (横浜国大), Yokokoku (横国) or YNU, is a national university located in Yokohama, Kanagawa Prefecture, Japan. Founded in 1876, it became a national university in 1949, and currently comprises five graduate schools and four undergraduate faculties.

The university has been evaluated highly from the business world and was ranked first in Kantō (including Greater Tokyo Area) and Kōshin'etsu region and second in Japan by personnel departments of leading companies in Japan in 2020. The university was also ranked tenth in Japan according to the ratio of the number of officers and managers produced to the number of graduates.

== History ==
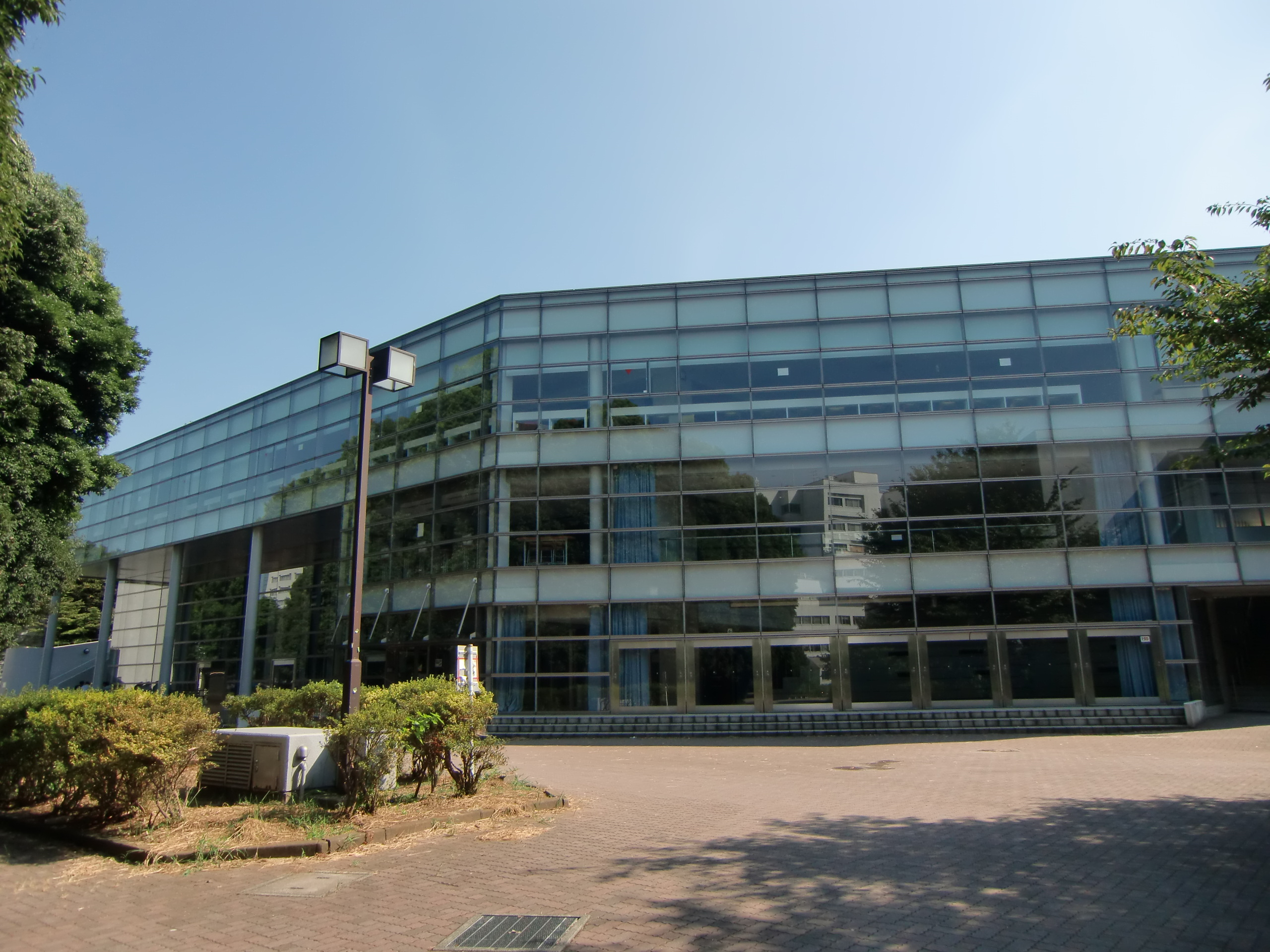
Central Library of Yokohama National University

The predecessor of the university, Yokohama Normal School, was founded in 1876. It became a Japanese national university in 1949 by the amalgamation of Kanagawa Normal School, Kanagawa Youth Normal School, Yokohama College of Economics and the Yokohama Institute of Technology.

The university was originally planned to be named as "Yokohama University", but at the time the former Yokohama City Economics College and Yokohama Vocational School also wanted to apply their names as Yokohama University. They had a consultation about the name and decided not to use name "Yokohama University".

The Faculty of Business Administration was founded in 1967. The university has master's degree programs in engineering (1962), economics (1972), business administration (1972), and education (1979). The Institute of Environmental Science and Technology was established in 1973 under the botanist Akira Miyawaki, and the Graduate School of International and Business Law was established in 1990. The Graduate School of International Development Studies was created in 1994 and the School of Law in 2004.

== Organisation ==
=== Undergraduate faculties ===
- College of Education
- College of Economics: Established in 1949 as one of the three original colleges, the College of Economics follows the great tradition of the former Yokohama Commercial College. The college (undergraduate) prides itself in contributing to the advancement of economic theory and empirics. Every year many aspiring students apply for entrance, and after an intensive four-year period of training in economic thought and research, they successfully graduate as competent experts in their fields. Recognized internationally as a center of economic study, an array of nationalities are represented in the college as lecturers, researchers and students. The College of Economics promotes cultural diversity and host many international students both on scholarships and self-funded. At the Master's level, the Faculty of Economics is host to the Joint Japan World Bank Graduate Scholarship Program. In the fall of 2013, YNU Economics began offering M.A. and Ph.D. degrees where the course content, advising, etc. is offered entirely in the English language.
- College of Business Administration: Yokohama National University's Faculty of Business Administration was established in 1967, and currently composed of four disciplinary areas: the Division of Business Administration, the Division of Accounting and Information, the Division of Management System Science and the Division of International Business. The faculty places emphasis on internationalization, with not only Japanese students, but also many students from overseas currently enrolled. Students are free to register subjects outside of their own division, and so are able to gain an education that covers all aspects of business administration. In the latter half of second year, students are assigned to a seminar, where they do research in a specialized area of an advising professor.
- College of Engineering Science
- College of Urban Sciences: Urban Sciences is an academic field that focuses on an important theme—how cities should be in the future—from a scientific point of view. The College of Urban Sciences was newly established in April 2017, and comprises the following four departments: (1) the Department of Urban and Social Collaboration for studying cultural and social sciences, with the objective of create a pleasant urban society and culture; (2) the Department of Architecture and Building Science for studying creative architecture, urban environments, and town development; (3) the Department of Civil Engineering for studying technology and management relating to the infrastructure supporting urban activities; and (4) the Department of Risk Management and Environmental Science for studying sustainable urban development with the understanding of natural and social environmental risks. The college pursues the development of talented people who can commit themselves to creating cities from broad perspectives that include liberal arts and scientific viewpoint.

=== Graduate Schools ===
- Graduate School of Education
- Graduate School of International Social Sciences
- Graduate School of Engineering Science
- Graduate School of Environment and Information Sciences
- Graduate School of Urban Innovation
- Interfaculty Graduate School of Innovative and Practical Studies

== Notable alumni ==
- Hironobu Sakaguchi, game designer, creator of Final Fantasy
- Takuzo Aida, polymer chemist in University of Tokyo
- Akira Fujishima, chemist, and the President of Tokyo University of Science
- Koshi Inaba, lead singer of the rock duo B'z
- Shunji Iwai, film director
- Katsuhiko Kawasoe, former President and chief executive officer of Mitsubishi Motors
- Le Thi Tuyet Mai, Ambassador and Permanent Representative of the Permanent Mission of Vietnam to the United Nations Office and the World Trade Organization
- Kaori Manabe, Japanese television personality and model
- Chisato Minamimura, dancer and choreographer
- Masaya Nakamura, the founder of Namco Co., Ltd and the "Father of Pac-Man".
- Sumio Mabuchi, Japanese politician of the Democratic Party of Japan
- Shinichiro Sakurai, automotive engineer
- Akira Satō, photographer
- Hiromichi Tanaka, game designer
- Makoto Takahashi, CEO of KDDI
- Toshimitsu Misawa, President of Oracle Corporation Japan
- Kunimasa Suzuki, President of Intel Japan
- Ryō Kurusu, officer in the Imperial Japanese Army
- Ayako Kimura, olympic hurdler
- Kodo Nakano, olympic judoka
- Masayuki Takahashi, olympic sailor
- Kotaka Otsuma, pioneer of women's education in Japan
- Hidetoshi Nishijima, actor and model
- Yoshiaki Nishimura, lead film producer
- Yoshio Miyajima, cinematographer
- Ryue Nishizawa, a professor of Yokohama National University and Architect (awarded the Pritzker Prize)
- Kazumi Yamashita, manga artist
- Rankin' Taxi, reggae artist
- Kaoru Kuroki, adult video performer
- Junji Sakamoto, film director
- Masaya Kato, actor
- Tomomi Hayashi, architect
- Yousuke Ichikawa, actor and model
- Kihachirō Kawamoto, puppet designer, independent film director, screenwriter and animator
- Genichiro Takahashi, novelist
- Kōta Nozomi, novelist
- Jūkichi Yagi, poet
- Takeo Hirata, researcher at Waseda University
- Shigeo Hirose, professor at Tokyo Institute of Technology
- Hasegawa Yoshikazu, vertebrate palaeontologist and honorary museum director
- Yuliang Zheng, Chair of the Department of Computer and Information Sciences at the University of Alabama at Birmingham
- Yukio Tsuda, professor at the University of Tsukuba
- Tomida Yukimitsu, vertebrate palaeontologist
- Yoshiaki Itakura, businessman and researcher of military history
- Katsuhiko Kawasoe, former CEO of Mitsubishi Motors
- Masatoshi Muto, diplomat
- Thanong Bidaya, Thai politician
- Sumio Mabuchi, politician
- Masayoshi Nataniya, politician
- Kimie Hatano, politician
- Kuniji Toda, engineer and politician
- Hisako Ōishi, politician
- Takako Ebata, politician
