= Ohmi Railway Yōkaichi Line =

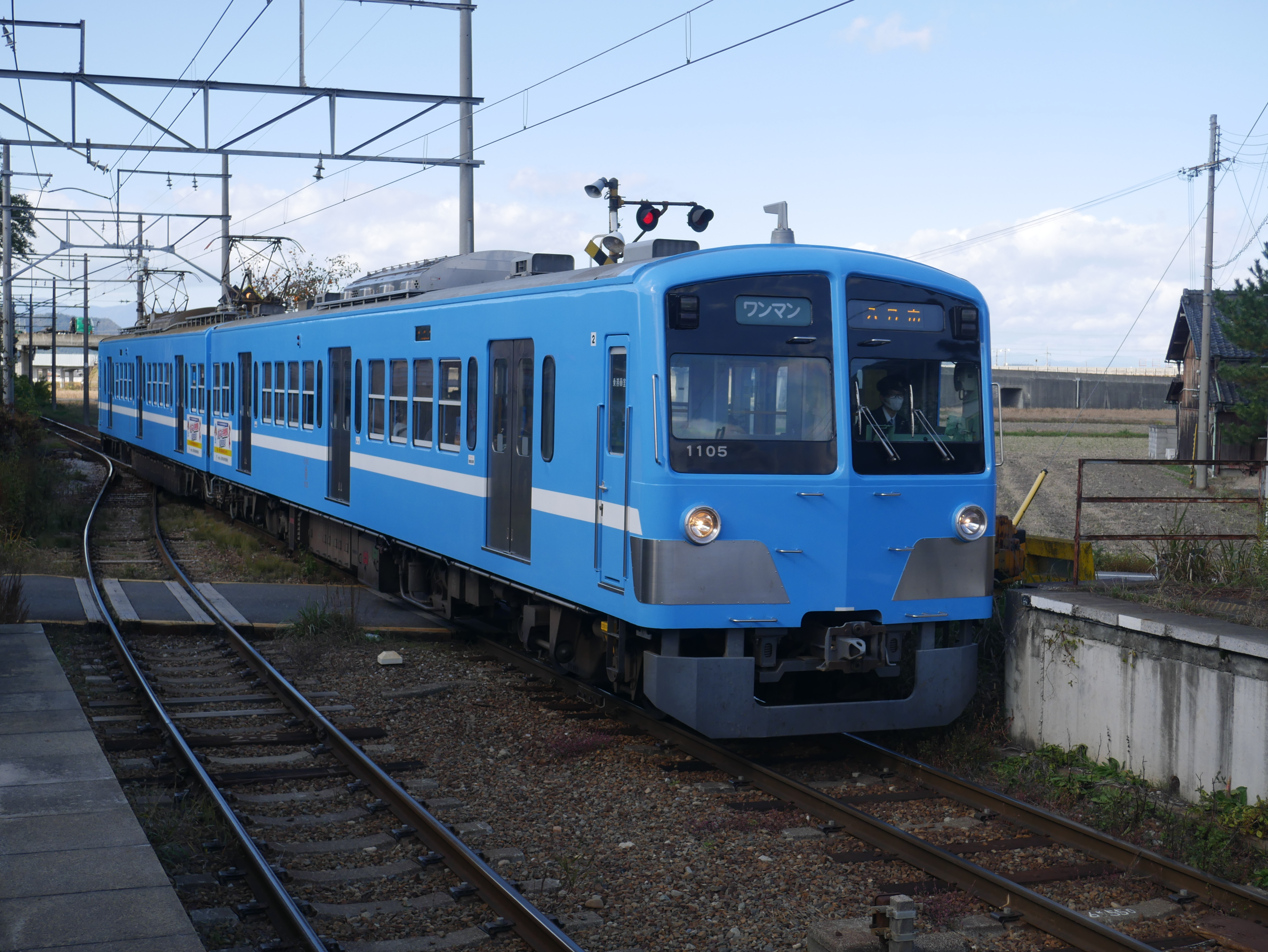
- Ohmi Railway Yōkaichi Line

Overview
- Native name: 近江鉄道八日市線
- Termini: Yōkaichi; Ōmi-Hachiman
- Stations: 7
- Website: https://www.ohmitetudo.co.jp/

Service
- Type: Commuter rail
- Operator(s): Ohmi Railway

History
- Opened: 1913

Technical
- Line length: 9.3 km (5.8 mi)
- Track gauge: 1,067 mm (3 ft 6 in)
- Electrification: 1,500 V DC

The Ohmi Railway Yōkaichi Line (近江鉄道八日市線, Ōmi Tetsudō Yōkaichi-sen) is a regional railway line in Shiga Prefecture operated by Ohmi Railway.

The line is 9.3 km long, connecting Yōkaichi on the Main Line in Higashiōmi to Ōmi-Hachiman on the JR West Biwako Line in Omihachiman.

In addition to local shuttle trains, the Yōkaichi Line trains include Rapid Service that connects Yōkaichi and Ōmi-Hachiman nonstop, and through trains to the Main Line to Maibara or Kibukawa.

== History ==
The Hunan Railway Co. opened the line in 1913, and merged with the Ohmi Railway Co. in 1944.

The line was electrified at 1,500 VDC in 1946.

=== Former connecting lines ===
- Shin-Yōkaichi station - A 3km line to the Misono airfield operated between 1930 and 1948.

== Stations ==
Rapid Service: + = stop; - = pass;
Local trains make all stops

No.	Station	Japanese	Distance (km)	Rapid	Connections	Location	
OR-15	Yōkaichi	八日市	0.0	+	Ohmi Railway Main Line	Higashiōmi	Shiga Prefecture
OR-16	Shin-Yōkaichi	新八日市	0.6	-		Higashiōmi	Shiga Prefecture
OR-17	Tarōbōgū-mae	太郎坊宮前	1.3	-		Higashiōmi	Shiga Prefecture
OR-18	Ichinobe	市辺	3.0	-		Higashiōmi	Shiga Prefecture
OR-19	Hirata	平田	5.0	-		Higashiōmi	Shiga Prefecture
OR-20	Musa	武佐	6.5	+		Ōmihachiman	Shiga Prefecture
OR-21	Ōmi-Hachiman	近江八幡	9.3	+	JR West: Tōkaidō Main Line (Biwako Line)	Ōmihachiman	Shiga Prefecture

== See also ==
- List of railway lines in Japan
