= Chisato Minamimura =

Deaf dancer and choreographer

Chisato Minamimura is a British dancer and choreographer. She is deaf and a British Sign Language user.

== Background ==
Minamimura was born in Tokyo, Japan, and became deaf as a baby, after a treatment for a fever. As a child, she attended mainstream schools. Her family encouraged her to learn piano. Minamimura received a BA in Japanese Painting and a MA from Yokohama National University. She then became interested in dance and moved to London to train at Trinity Laban Contemporary Dance Centre.

Since moving to Britain, she started using British Sign Language, as she cannot lipread English.

She returned to Japan, where she worked as a dancer and tutor for four years, before returning to Britain upon being offered a job with CandoCo Dance Company in 2003. She stayed with the company until 2006. She has also worked with the Graeae Theatre Company.

After a few years of working as a dancer, she decided to move to choreography. Her style takes inspiration from the movements of sign language and blends elements of mime, visual vernacular, projections, music, conceptual dance, as well as what she describes as "visual sound". She often performs aerial dance on sway poles, trapeze or other vertical supports and surfaces.

== Activity ==
Minamimura has taught and performed dance across 20 different countries. She performed aerial dance at the London 2012 Paralympic Opening Ceremony and at the Rio 2016 Paralympic Cultural Olympics.

Some of Minamimura's past projects include "SoundMoves", where dance and movement were digitally converted into images and lights, "New Beats", exploring the visual rhythm generated by the body parts, and "Ring the Changes+", which use technology to enhance the dance experience

Minamimura's one-hour performance, "Scored in Silence" (2020), was created to commemorate the 75th anniversary of the bombing of Hiroshima and Nagasaki. For this show, Minamimura interviewed the last deaf hibakusha (people who survived the bombing) still alive.
