= Takeo Hirata =

Japanese sports scientist

- Born: January 16, 1960 (age 66); Osaka, Japan
- Citizenship: Japanese
- Scientific career
- Fields: Sports science
- Workplaces: Waseda University

Takeo Hirata (平田 竹男, Hirata Takeo; born 16 January 1960) is a Japanese researcher at the Waseda University.

== Early life ==
Takeo Hirata was born on 16 January 1960 in Osaka, Japan.

He went to Osaka Prefectural Otemae Senior High School during his younger years. In 1982, he graduated from the Faculty of Business Administration at the Yokohama National University.

== Career ==
After graduating from the university, Hirata was employed at the Ministry of International Trade and Industry. In 1987, he received a post-graduate Master of Public Administration degree from Harvard University's John F. Kennedy School of Government. From 1991 to 1994 he served as the First Secretary at the Embassy of Japan in Brazil. During that time, he became friends with Cafu, a Brazilian footballer. From 1999 to 2001, he was engaged in oil resource development in the Middle East, as the director for international petroleum affairs at the Agency for Natural Resources and Energy.

In 1989, when the service industry office of the Ministry of International Trade and Industry considered expanding sports business, he met Saburō Kawabuchi during the preparation phase for the soccer's JSL study committee on professionalizing Japan's soccer league. He joined the advisory board and contributed to shaping the J. League's principles. He also took part in the Japanese bidding committee for the 2002 FIFA World Cup. In 2002, the Japan Football Association appointed him to be a General Secretary. He was mainly engaged in public relations and coordination with the international representatives. He also established the commission for matching international games of representatives.

In 2006, he resigned from the general secretary position, as his term had expired. Since July 2006, he had been the Vice-Chairman and Managing Director of honor. In 2008, he acquired a Degree in Engineering from the University of Tokyo.

He became a professor of the Graduate School of Sport Sciences at Waseda University. Graduates of his master (doctor) course at Waseda University include Masumi Kuwata, Tokimitsu Ishizawa, Naoki Soma, and Tomohiro Nagatsuka among others.

In addition to his own field Sports Business, he was also responsible for the lectures on energy and environment from his experience as a bureaucrat. Since March 2007, he served as an auditor at Rakuten. In 2009, he served as an auditor at Japan Association of Athletics Federations, and in 2010, he became the director of the Tokyo Marathon Foundation board.

== Positions ==
- He is an official of the Ministry of International Trade and Industry.
- He was a former General Secretary and currently the Honorary Vice President of the Japan Football Association
- Professor at the Graduate School of Sports Sciences at the Waseda University
- Auditor of the Japan Association of Athletics Federations
- Chairperson of the Japan Society of Sports Industry
- Member of the board of the Tokyo Marathon Foundation, 2010

== Research Interests ==
Takeo Hinata was interested in Sports science.

=== Works ===
Some of his works include:

- A War Named Football: the Backstage of Diplomatic Negotiation for the Japanese Team, 2009.
- Study the Baseball. Shinchosha, 2010.
- The best textbook for Sports Business, 2012.
- The Forefront of the Top Sports Business series
  - "Triple Mission, Spread, Market, Victory", 2006. (Note: Hirata, Takeo, Yoshio Nakamura. "Triple mission, Spread, Market, Victory". Kodansha, 2006.)
  - "Strategy for Revenue and Win", 2006. (Note: Hirata, Takeo, Yoshio Nakamura. "Strategy for revenue and win". Kodansha, 2006.)
  - "From the Sports Writing Business to the Broadcasting Rights Business", 2006. (Note: Hirata, Takeo, Yoshio Nakamura. "From the Sports Writing Business to the Broadcasting Rights Business". Kodansha, 2006.)
  - "From the Morning Musume's Mission for Spreading Futsal to Retirement Project of Hidetoshi Nakata", 2007. (Note: Hirata, Takeo, Yoshio Nakamura. "From the Morning Musume's mission for spreading futsal to retirement project of Hidetoshi Nakata". Kodansha, 2007.)
  - "Work To Make a Dream Come True". Kodansha, 2008. (Note: Hirata, Takeo, Yoshio Nakamura. "Work to make a dream come true". Kodansha, 2008.)
  - "Road to the Dream Job", 2009. (Note: Hirata, Takeo, Yoshio Nakamura. "Road to the Dream Job". Kodansha, 2009.)

=== Other publications ===
- Futabasha, Soccer Criticism, September 2003.
- Asahi Shimbun
- The Nikkei Evening edition, August 1, 2002
- Weekly Post, Shogakukan, September 14, 2007 issue.
- Significance of Sports Diplomacy, 2006.
- Delight in South Africa. Stimulation of Demands, June 10, 2010.
- Let's Discuss About the World Cup, July 13, 2010.
- Study the J-League series
  - "A Club Should be Able to Gather Guests Even in Enemy Territory", October 5, 2010. (Note: "Club should be able to gather guests even in enemy territory". Asahi Shimbun, Series, October 5, 2010.)
  - "The force of Terrestrial Broadcasting to Expand Fans", October 19, 2010. (Note: "The force of terrestrial broadcasting to expand fans". Asahi Shimbun, Series, October 19, 2010.)
  - "Can Urawa Become a True Leader?", October 26, 2010. (Note: "Can Urawa become a true leader?". Asahi Shimbun, Series, October 26, 2010.)
  - "The Core of the Club is Training Youth", November 2, 2010. (Note: "The core of the club is training youth". Asahi Shimbun, Series, November 2, 2010.)
  - "Not a Simple Effect of the Appreciation of The Yen", November 23, 2010. (Note: "Not a simple effect of the appreciation of the yen". Asahi Shimbun, Series, November 23, 2010.)
  - "A Mechanism for Everybody's Benefit", November 30, 2010. (Note: "A mechanism for everybody's benefit". Asahi Shimbun, Series, November 30, 2010.)
