= Hirata Station (Nagano) =

Railway station in Matsumoto, Nagano Prefecture, Japan

SN04 Hirata Station 平田駅
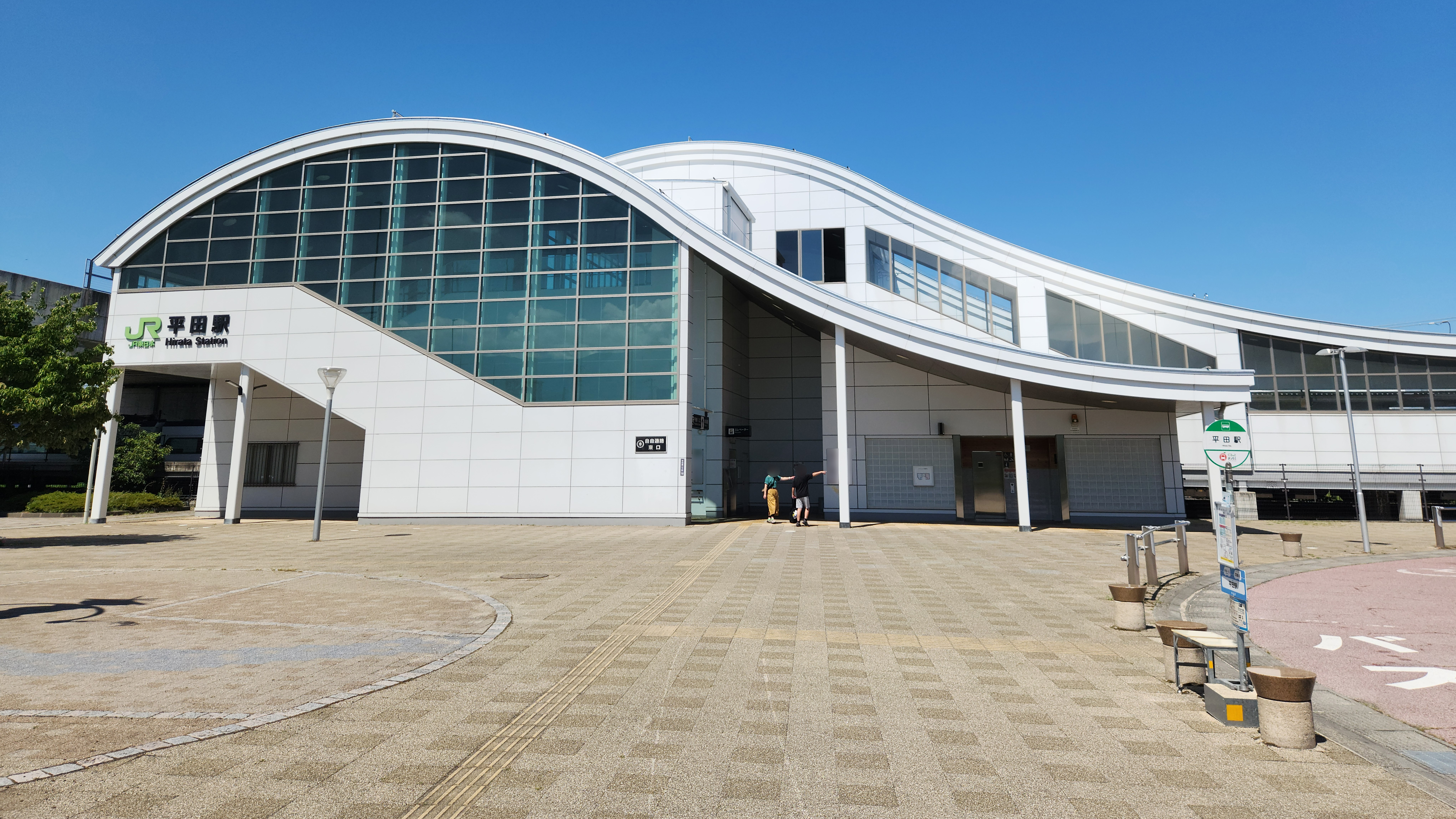
- East entrance of Hirata Station in August 2024

General information
- Location: 2-162-2 Hirata-nishi, Matsumoto-shi, Nagano-ken 399-0015; Japan
- Coordinates: 36°11′30″N 137°57′45″E
- Elevation: 609.0 meters
- Operator: JR East
- Line: Shinonoi Line
- Distance: 8.8 km from Shiojiri
- Platforms: 2 side platforms

Other information
- Status: Staffed (Midori no Madoguchi)
- Station code: SN04
- Website: Official website

History
- Opened: 18 March 2007

Passengers
- FY2015: 1448 (daily)

Services
Preceding station	JR East	Following station
Murai SN03 towards Shiojiri	Shinonoi Line Rapid; Local & Rapid Misuzu	Minami-Matsumoto SN05 towards Shinonoi
Location
- Location within Nagano Prefecture Location within Japan

Hirata Station (平田駅, Hirata-eki) is a train station in the city of Matsumoto, Nagano Prefecture, Japan, operated by East Japan Railway Company (JR East).

== Lines ==
Hirata Station is served by the Shinonoi Line and is 8.8 kilometers from the terminus of the line at Shiojiri Station.Many trains of the Chūō Main Line continue past the nominal intermediate terminus of the line at Shiojiri and continue on to Matsumoto via this station.

== Station layout ==
The station consists of two ground-level opposed side platforms, connected by an elevated station building. The station has a Midori no Madoguchi staffed ticket office.

=== Platforms ===
1	■ Shinonoi Line	for Matsumoto, Shinonoi and Nagano
2	■ Shinonoi Line	for Shiojiri and Kami-Suwa

== History ==
Hirata Station opened on 18 March 2007. Station numbering introduced on the line from February 2025, with the station being assigned number SN04.

== Passenger statistics ==
In fiscal 2015, the station was used by an average of 1448 passengers daily (boarding passengers only).

== Surrounding area ==
- National Route 19

== See also ==
- List of railway stations in Japan
