= Yōkaichi Station =

Railway station in Higashiōmi, Shiga Prefecture, Japan

Yōkaichi Station 八日市駅
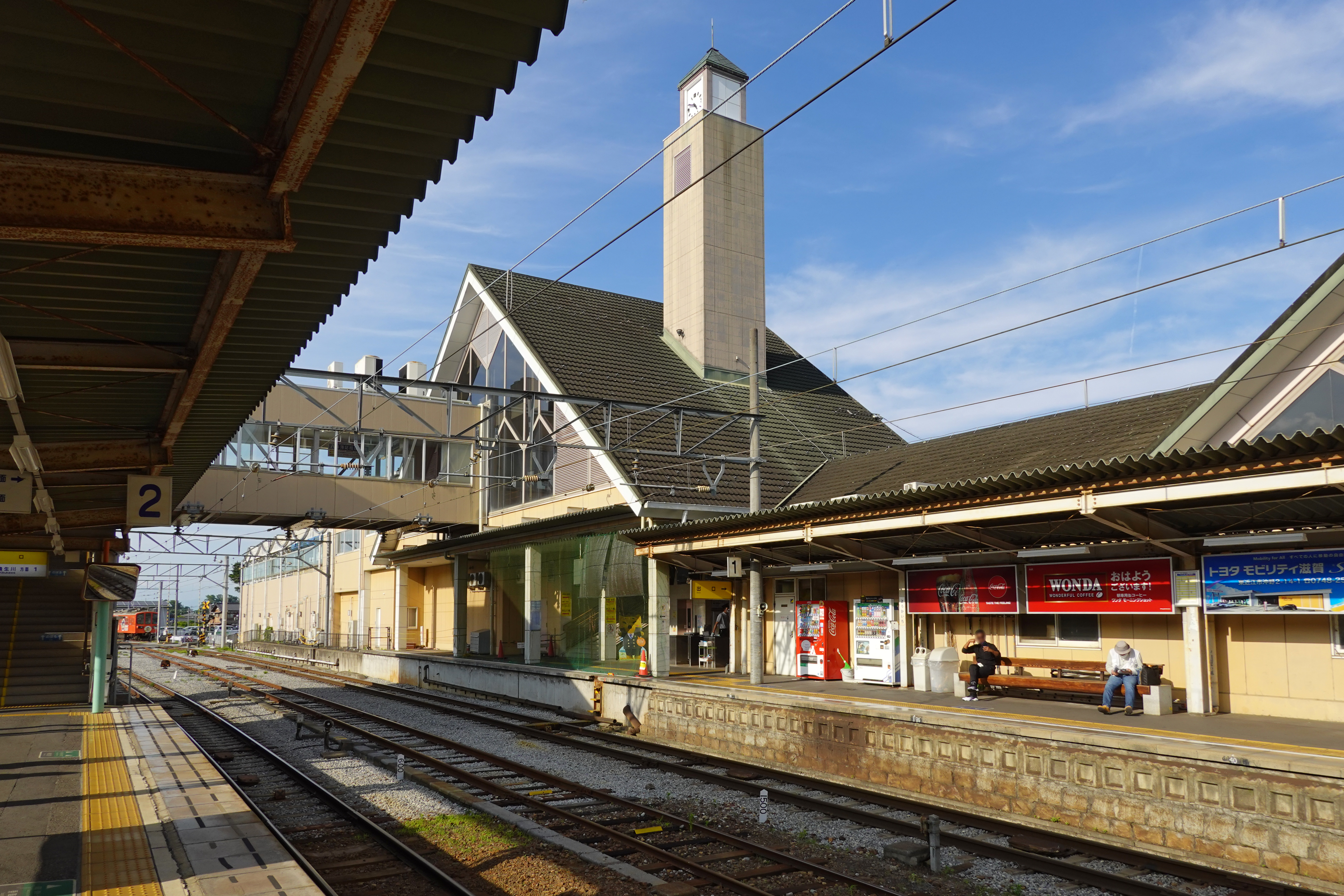
- Platforms and station building, June 2024

General information
- Location: 1 Yōkaichihamanochō, Higashiōmi-shi, Shiga-ken 527-0011; Japan
- Coordinates: 35.114485°N 136.194849°E
- Operator: Ohmi Railway
- Lines: ■ Main Line (Koto Ohmi Line / Minakuchi Gamono Line); ■ Yōkaichi Line (Man-yō Akane Line)
- Distance: 25.3 km from Maibara
- Platforms: 1 island + 1 side platform

Other information
- Station code: OR15
- Website: Official website

History
- Opened: July 24, 1898

Passengers
- FY2019: 2161 daily
Location
- Location within Shiga Prefecture Location within Japan

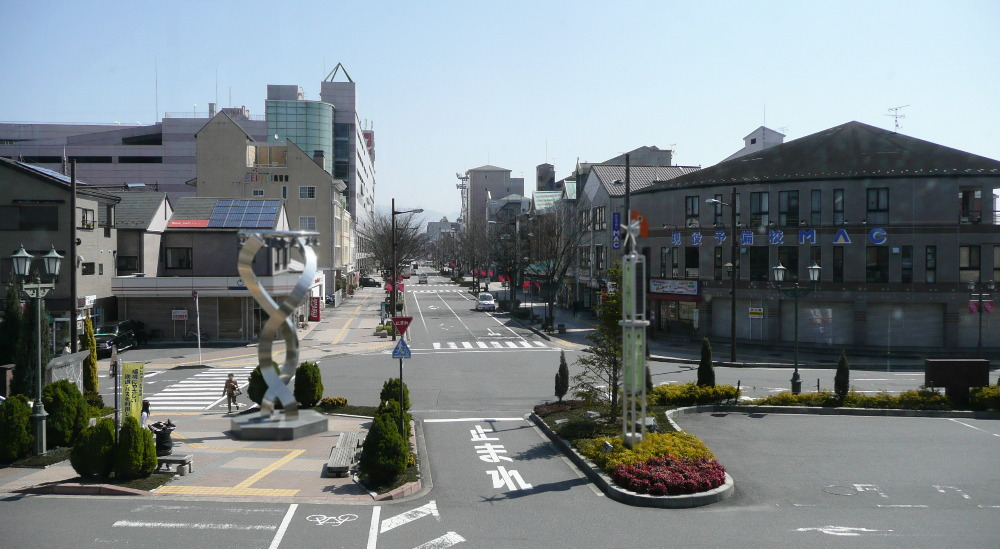
Station plaza

Yōkaichi Station (八日市駅, Yōkaichi-eki) is a passenger junction railway station located in the city of Higashiōmi, Shiga Prefecture, Japan. It is the main station in Higashiōmi city and one of the most important stations of Ohmi railway.

== Lines ==
Yōkaichi Station is served by the Ohmi Railway Main Line (Koto Ohmi Line, Minakuchi Gamono Line), and is located 25.3 rail kilometers from the terminus of the line at Maibara Station. It is also a terminus of the Yōkaichi Line (Man-yō Akane Line) and is 9.3 kilometers from the opposing terminus of that line at Ōmi-Hachiman Station.

== Station layout ==
The station consists of an island platform and a side platforms connected to the station building by a footbridge.

== Platforms ==
1	■ Main Line (Minakuchi Gamono Line)	for Hino and Kibukawa
2	■ Main Line (Koto Ohmi Line)	for Hikone and Maibara
3	■ Yōkaichi Line (Man-yō Akane Line)	for Hirata and Ōmi-Hachiman

== Adjacent stations ==
«	Service	»
Ohmi Railway Main Line
Koto Ohmi Line
Minakuchi Gamono Line
Kawabe-no-mori	-	Nagatanino
Ohmi Railway Yōkaichi Line (Man-yō Akane Line)
Terminus	-	Shin-Yōkaichi

== History ==
Yōkaichi Station was opened on July 24, 1898. The station building was reconstructed in 1998. A museum was opened don the second floor of the station building in 2019.

== Passenger statistics ==
In fiscal 2019, the station was used by an average of 2161 passengers daily (boarding passengers only).

== Buses ==
"Ohmi Railway bus" for Notogawa Station, Eigen-ji and "Chokotto-bus" (municipal buses) depart and arrive from this station.

== Surroundings ==
- Shopping Plaza Apia (Al Plaza Yokaichi)
- Shiga Prefectural Yokaichi High School
- Honmachi Shopping Arcade

== See also ==
- List of railway stations in Japan
