= Ohmi Railway =

Railway company in Shiga Prefecture, Japan

Ohmi Railway Co., Ltd

Overview
- Main region: Shiga Prefecture
- Stations called at: 33
- Parent company: Seibu Holdings (100%)
- Headquarters: Hikone, Shiga Prefecture
- Locale: Shiga Prefecture, Japan
- Dates of operation: June 16, 1896; 130 years ago–present

Technical
- Track gauge: 1,067 mm (3 ft 6 in)
- Electrification: 1,500 V DC, overhead line
- Length: 59.5 km (37.0 miles)

Other
- Website: www.ohmitetudo.co.jp

Ohmi Railway Co., Ltd. (近江鉄道株式会社, Ōmi Tetsudō Kabushiki-gaisha) is a Japanese private railway company which operates in Shiga Prefecture, and a member of the Seibu group since 1943. The company is named after the Ōmi Province, the former name of the present-day Shiga. The railway is nicknamed "Gachakon train" (ガチャコン電車, Gachakon densha) by local users because of its noisy sound.

== History ==
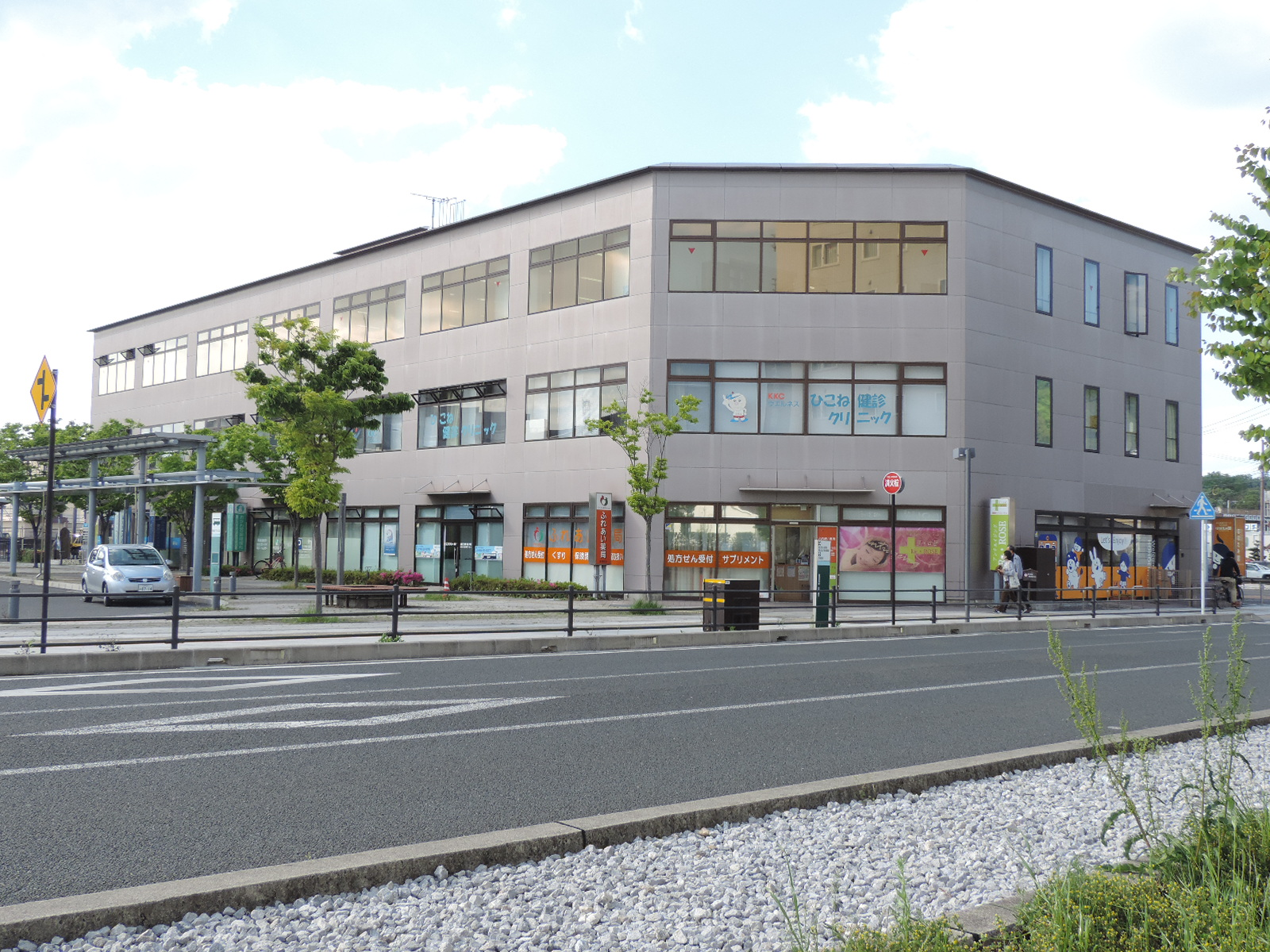
Ohmi Railway Headquarters

Ohmi Railway is the longest private railway company in Shiga. The company was founded in 1896 and started train services from Hikone to Echigawa in 1898. The company was a subsidiary of Ujigawa Electric (宇治川電気, Ujigawa Denki) from 1926 to 1942. In 1944, the company absorbed the Yōkaichi Railway (八日市鉄道, Yōkaichi Tetsudō), now the Yokaichi Line.

== Lines ==
Ohmi Railway consists of three lines: the Main Line, and two branch lines, the Yōkaichi Line and the Taga Line.

The Main Line connects with the Tōkaidō Main Line (Biwako Line), the Hokuriku Main Line and the Tōkaidō Shinkansen at Maibara, the Biwako Line at Hikone, and the Kusatsu Line and the Shigaraki Kōgen Railway at Kibukawa. The Yōkaichi Line connects with the Biwako Line at Ōmi-Hachiman.

Name	Termini		Opened	Length	Stations
Main Line	Maibara	Kibukawa	11 June 1898	47.7 km (29.6 mi)	25
Yōkaichi Line	Yōkaichi	Ōmi-Hachiman	29 December 1913	9.3 km (5.8 mi)	7
Taga Line	Takamiya	Taga Taisha-mae	8 March 1914	2.5 km (1.6 mi)	3
Total				59.5 km (37.0 mi)	33

At first, the Main Line was planned to connect Hikone and Fukawa (now Kōnan) and run through to Ujiyamada. The Yōkaichi Line had a 2.8 km branch line from Shin-Yōkaichi to Misono between 1930 and 1964.

== Other services ==
The company also operates bus lines, taxis, Hachimanyama Ropeway, Shizugatake Lift, ships of Lake Biwa, a tour operator, an onsen hotel, two expressway service areas, a campsite, a driving school and parks in Shiga.
