= Ōmi-Hachiman Station =

Railway station in Ōmihachiman, Shiga Prefecture, Japan

Ōmi-Hachiman Station 近江八幡駅
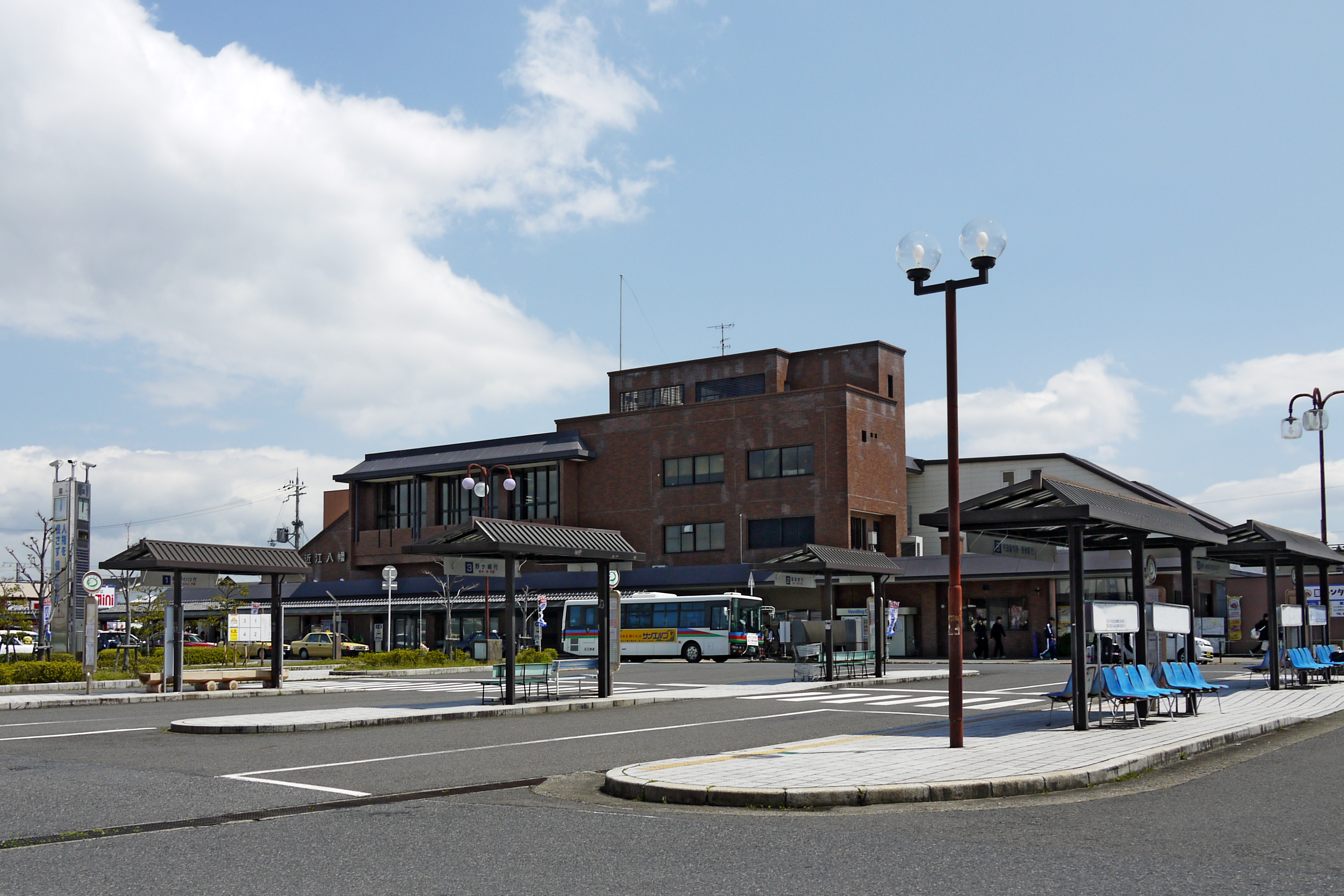
- The north gate of Ōmi-Hachiman Station

General information
- Location: Takakai-cho Ōmihachiman-shi, Shiga-ken 523-0891; Japan
- Coordinates: 35.1228835°N 136.1027527°E
- Operator: JR West; Ohmi Railway
- Lines: Biwako Line; ■Yōkaichi Line
- Distance: 28.4 km from Maibara
- Platforms: 1 side + 2 island platforms

Other information
- Station code: JR-A19 OR21

History
- Opened: 1 July 1889
- Former names: Hachiman; Shin-Hachiman (until 1919)

Passengers
- FY 2023: 31,448 daily (JR); 2,548 daily (Ohmi)
Location
- Location within Shiga Prefecture Location within Japan

Ōmi-Hachiman Station (近江八幡駅, Ōmi-Hachiman-eki) is an interchange passenger railway station located in the city of Ōmihachiman, Shiga, Japan, operated by the West Japan Railway Company (JR West) and the private railway operator Ohmi Railway.

== Lines ==
Ōmi-Hachiman Station is served by the Biwako Line portion of the JR Tōkaidō Main Line, and is 28.4 kilometers from Maibara and 474.3 kilometers from Tokyo. It is also served by the Ohmi Railway Yōkaichi Line and is 9.3 kilometers from the terminus of that line at Yōkaichi.

== Layout ==
The JR station has one side platform and one island platform serving three tracks, with an elevated station building. The station has a Midori no Madoguchi staffed ticket office. The Ohmi Railway portion of the has one island platform.

== Platforms ==
1	■ Biwako Line	for Maibara, Nagahama and Ōgaki
2, 3	■ Biwako Line	for Kusatsu and Kyoto

■ Yōkaichi Line	for Hikone and Maibara for Yokaichi

== Adjacent stations ==
«	Service	»
West Japan Railway Company Biwako Line
Limited Express "Hida": Does not stop at this station
Notogawa	Special Rapid	Yasu
Azuchi	Local (Rapid service: Kyoto or Takatsuki - Akashi)	Shinohara
Ohmi Railway Yōkaichi Line
Musa	Rapid	Terminus
Musa	Local	Terminus

== History ==
The Tōkaidō Main Line station opened on July 1, 1889, when the railway between Sekigahara Station and Baba Station (now Zeze Station) began operation. The station was originally named Hachiman Station (八幡駅); on March 11, 1919, the prefix Ōmi was added. The Ohmi Railway station opened on December 29, 1913, as Shin-Hachiman Station (新八幡駅) of the Konan Railway. It was renamed Ōmi-Hachiman in 1919 as well.

Station numbering was introduced to the Tokaido Line platforms in March 2018 with Ōmi-Hachiman being assigned station number JR-A19.

== Passenger statistics ==
In fiscal 2019, the JR portion of the station was used by an average of 17,734 passengers daily (boarding passengers only), and the Ohmi Railway portion of the station by 2,703 passengers daily (boarding passengers only)

== Surrounding area ==
- Omihachiman City Hall
- Omihachiman Cultural Center
- Omihachima Municipal Medical Center
- Shiga Hachiman Hospital
- Omihachiman Chamber of Commerce
- Shiga Prefectural Hachiman High School
- Shiga Prefectural Hachiman Commercial High School
- Omihachiman City Kirihara Higashi Elementary School

== See also ==
- List of railway stations in Japan
