= Taga =

Taga may refer to:

== Places ==
Japan

- Taga District, Ibaraki, Ibaraki Prefecture
- Hitachi-Taga Station in Ibaraki Prefecture
- Yamashiro-Taga Station in Kyoto Prefecture
- Taga, Shiga in Shiga Prefecture
- Taga-taisha, a Shinto shrine in Shiga Prefecture
- Taga Taisha-mae Station in Shiga Prefecture
- Ohmi Railway Taga Line in Shiga Prefecture
- Taga Castle in Tōhoku Prefecture

Other

- Taga, Bhiwani, a village in India
- Taga, Burkina Faso, a village
- Taga, Iran, a village
- Taga, Mali, a village
- Țaga, a commune in Cluj County, Romania
- Taga-Roostoja, a village in Estonia
- Taga, Samoa, a village
- Oued Taga, a town in north-eastern Algeria
- House of Taga, an archeological site on the island of Tinian, United States Commonwealth of the Northern Mariana Islands

== Other uses ==
- Taga (surname)
- Taga (Mandaeism), ritual crown in Mandaeism
- Tyagi (or Taga), an Indian surname
- 3997 Taga, a main-belt asteroid
- Technical Association of the Graphic Arts, an American professional association
