= Tenshō-daijin Honji =

Tenshō-daijin Honji (天照大神本地) is a Japanese otogi-zōshi in one book, composed in the early sixteenth century.

== Plot ==
In the land of Haranai (はらなひ国), King Kentatsuha (けんたつは大王) longs for a son and prays to Kannon and is granted a son, Prince Meuon (めうをん太子). Three years later, the queen dies, and when a new queen arrives she falls in love with the prince but is rebuked by him. She grows to despise her stepson and plots against him, but he is saved by monks who are in reality manifestations of Buddhist deities such as Eleven-Faced Kannon and Chiichi-shōnin (ち一上人). The king and prince journey to Ise Shrine in Japan by way of Magadha. The king, whose true form (本地 honji) is Dainichi Nyorai, resides in the Inner Shrine, and the prince, whose true form is Eleven-Faced Kannon, resides in the Outer Shrine. The prince's birth mother is Taga-daimyōjin, and Chiichi-shōnin is Kokūzō of Asamagatake (朝熊岳虚空蔵 Asamagatake Kokūzō).

The main story of the work is followed by an elaboration on the oral traditions and origins of ceremonies related to the tale.

== Genre, date and sources ==
Tenshō-daijin Honji is a work of the otogi-zōshi genre. More specifically, it is a honji-mono (本地物), a work elaborating the continental (Indian) Buddhist origins of Japanese deities (kami) in accordance with the ideology of honji suijaku. It is one of a number of works dealing with stepchildren (継子譚 keishi-tan).

The work was probably completed by Daiei 2 (1522), as this date is mentioned in the text of the work itself.

The theme of a stepmother's immoral love for her husband's child resembles the fourth story in Book IV of the Konjaku Monogatari-shū, as well as the sermon Aigo no Waka. The journey from India to Japan follows the pattern of Kumano no Honji (熊野の本地) and others, and the name of the character Chiichi-shōnin resembles that of Chiken-shōnin (ちけん上人) in Kumano no Honji. Kazuo Tokuda, in his article on the work for the Nihon Koten Bungaku Daijiten, remarks that these works could be considered a series of tales that elaborate on the religious beliefs and traditions of the Ise-Kumano-Taga, Shiga region.

== Textual tradition ==
Tenshō-daijin Honji is in one book. The work survives in a single manuscript copy in the holdings of the Keiō University Library.

=== Modern editions ===
The work was printed in volume ten of the Muromachi-jidai Monogatari Taisei (室町時代物語大成).
