= Binmanji Ishibotokedani Necropolis =

Sengoku period cemetery in Taga, Japan

- 敏満寺石仏谷墓跡 (Japanese)
- Binmanji Ishibotokedani Necropolis Binmanji Ishibotokedani Necropolis (Japan)
- 35°12′47″N 136°17′14″E
- Type: necropolis
- Periods: Sengoku period
- Location: Taga, Shiga, Japan
- Region: Kansai region

History
- Built: 13th-16th century AD

Site notes
- Public access: Yes (no public facilities)

The Binmanji Ishibotokedani Necropolis (敏満寺石仏谷墓跡, Binmanji ishibotoke-dani haka ato) is a Sengoku period cemetery located in the town of Taga, Inukami District, Shiga Prefecture in the Kansai region of Japan. It was designated a National Historic Site of Japan in 2005.

== Overview ==
The Buddhist temple of Binman-ji was once located on the eastern shore of Lake Biwa in the central part of Shiga Prefecture. Belonging to the Tendai sect, it is mentioned in historical records from the early Kamakura period in connection with a copper Gorintō pagoda that the priest Chōgen donated for reconstruction of Tōdai-ji in Nara. This artifact survives and is a National Important Cultural Property. The temple was fortified in the Sengoku period and was in an area hotly contested between Asai Nagamasa and Oda Nobunaga. It was destroyed in 1571 by Nobunaga and never rebuilt. The stone foundations of the temple were re-used in the construction of Hikone Castle and little trace of the temple itself remains.

However, behind the temple site at the foot of Mount Seiryu is one of the largest groups of medieval tombs from the 13th to the 16th century in Japan. The center of the temple appears to have been near the precincts of the current Konomiya Shrine, and the flat surfaces around the shrine are the foundations for various of its buildings. To the north of the shrine are the ruins of fortifications and townhouses from the 15th to 16th centuries, which housed the large sōhei military force which protected the temple.

The necropolis area is to the south of the temple ruins and consists of many stone Buddhas, Gorintō, Hōkyōintō and plain boulders used as gravestones, for a total of over 1600 tombs. The Taga Town Board of Education conducted a partial archaeological excavation from 1995 to 2004 for surveying and confirmation of contents. Some of the tombs were for multiple burials. There are ten flat areas distributed within the necropolis area, which were the foundations of chapels or other structures, including what appears to have been a crematorium. Burial urns include examples of Seto ware, Mino ware, Tokoname ware, Shigaraki ware, Bizen-yaki, Suzu ware, Echizen ware and Chinese ceramics. From these relics, it is thought that the tombs were built in the latter half of the 13th to 16th centuries, and the burials are estimated to be of a relatively homogeneous hierarchy.

The site is about a 15-minute walk from Tagataishamae Station on the Ohmi Railway.

== See also ==
- List of Historic Sites of Japan (Shiga)
