= Screen Holdings =

Japanese semiconductor equipment manufacturer

SCREEN Holdings Co., Ltd.

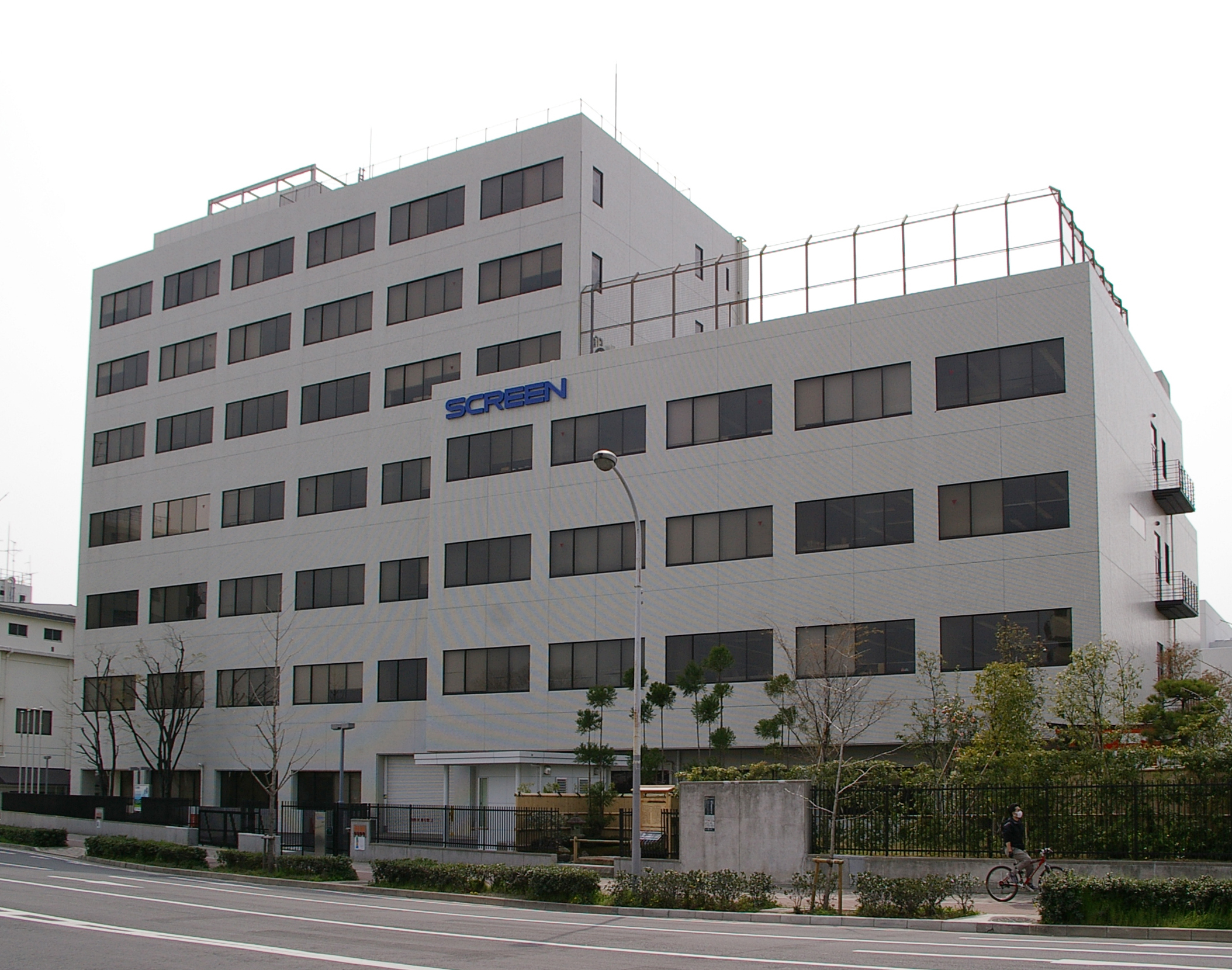
- Headquarters in Kamigyō-ku, Kyoto
- Native name: 株式会社SCREENホールディングス
- Formerly: Dainippon Screen Mfg. Co., Ltd. (1943–2014)
- Company type: Public (K.K)
- Traded as: TYO: 7735; Nikkei 225 Component
- Industry: Semiconductors
- Founded: 1868; 158 years ago (as Ishida Kyokuzan Printing Works) in Kyoto, Japan; October 11, 1943; 82 years ago (as Dainippon Screen Mfg. Co., Ltd.,)
- Headquarters: Tenjinkita-machi 1-1, Teranouchi-agaru 4-chome, Horikawa-dori, Kamigyō-ku, Kyoto, Japan
- Key people: Eiji Kakiuchi (CEO)
- Products: Semiconductor equipment; FPD equipment; Prepress/Printing equipment; PCB equipment; Solar Cell equipment; LiB equipment
- Number of employees: 337 (non-consolidated); 5,422 (consolidated); (2017)
- Website: www.screen.co.jp/eng/

SCREEN Holdings Co., Ltd. (株式会社SCREENホールディングス) is a Japanese semiconductor and electronics company, headquartered in Kyoto, engaged in the manufacture and sale of equipment for the manufacturing of semiconductors, flat panel displays, storage media (such as optical discs) and precision technology manufacturing equipment.

SCREEN Holdings has several sites in Japan, with offices in Kyoto, Kudanminami, Chiyoda, Tokyo, Etchūjima, Koto, Tokyo and manufacturing plants in Kyoto, Yasu, Shiga, Hikone, and Taga, Shiga,

The SCREEN Holdings Group has many subsidiaries in Japan, the United States, the UK, Germany, the Netherlands, China, Hong Kong, South Korea, Taiwan, Singapore and Australia.

On August 5, 2014, the company announced a change of its corporate name from its name at the time, Dainippon Screen Mfg. Co., Ltd. (大日本スクリーン製造株式会社), to Screen Holdings, as it restructured to become a holding company.

Korea's largest semiconductor manufacturer SEMES Co. Ltd. was made as a joint venture with SCREEN using the latter's technology. Currently they have no capital relationship but SEMES continues to use technology from SCREEN and gets all its revenue with orders from Samsung's cleaning equipment.

== See also ==
- Screen Station
