= Technical Association of the Graphic Arts =

TAGA Logo

The Technical Association of the Graphic Arts (TAGA) is an organization founded in 1948 in Chicago, Illinois, United States, to publish information about the graphic arts industry. It currently operates out of Warrendale, Pennsylvania.

== Background ==
Founded as the Technical Association of the Lithographic Industry (TALI), the organization was re-branded as TAGA in 1951 and has continued with that name ever since. The organization works with student chapters around the world to publish information about the graphic arts industry on a yearly basis after its Annual Technical Conference held at a different location each year in North America.

TAGA provides to individual members worldwide, also maintains the industry's best permanent set of technical papers and abstracts. TAGA serves the CTO, CIO, and R&D management personnel of printers, publishers, and pre-media companies, as well as engineers and scientists employed by graphic arts systems and equipment providers, ink manufacturers, and paper manufacturers. TAGA focuses on graphic arts systems, software, and computer technology developments, as well as areas of press, ink, and paper engineering applications. The association also provides guidance and support to student chapters around the world.

In 2014, TAGA became a part of Printing Industries of America and is no longer an independent organization.

== Student chapters ==
Established in 1985, the TAGA Student Chapters are an integral part of the TAGA organization. Organized TAGA Student Chapters as well as individual students at several universities participate in technical research that is presented at the Annual Technical Conference.

The objectives of the TAGA Student Chapters are:

- To encourage research and scholarship among students at colleges and universities in the graphic arts and related disciplines
- To encourage dialogue among young scholars about technical issues impacting the graphic arts presently and about those issues of future importance
- To establish an organized body of individuals who are dedicated to pursuing careers in graphic arts technology, science, research, or teaching
- To provide students with publishing opportunities through the publication of a technical student publication by the student chapters
- To stimulate future TAGA membership by keeping objectives and activities in the forefront of students studying graphic arts or related disciplines

TAGA Currently has eight participating chapters in 2016: Appalachian State University, Ball State University, Cal Poly State University, Clemson University, Grenoble Institute of Technology, Rochester Institute of Technology, Ryerson University, and Western Michigan University.

== See also ==
- TARGA File Format, a raster graphics file format
