= Takamiya Station (Shiga) =

Railway station in Hikone, Shiga Prefecture, Japan

Takamiya Station 高宮駅
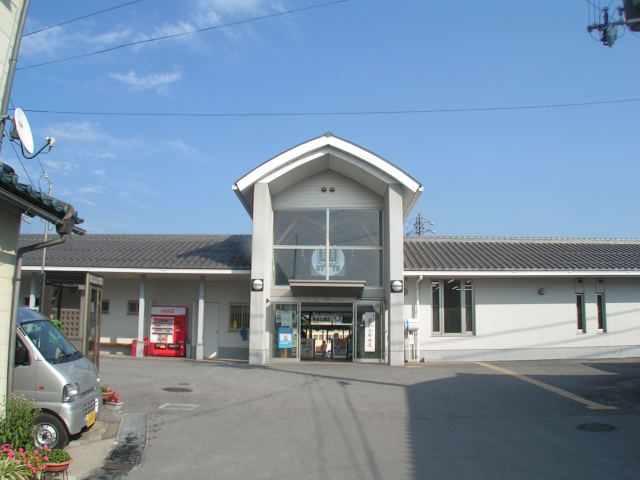
- Takamiya Station in October 2005

General information
- Location: 876-1 Takamiyacho, Hikone-shi, Shiga-ken 522-0201; Japan
- Coordinates: 35.236141°N 136.260512°E
- Operator: Ohmi Railway
- Line: ■ Ohmi Railway Main Line
- Distance: 9.9 km from Maibara
- Platforms: 1 side + 1 island platform

Other information
- Station code: OR07
- Website: Official website

History
- Opened: June 1, 1911

Passengers
- FY2019: 158 daily
Location
- Location within Shiga Prefecture Location within Japan

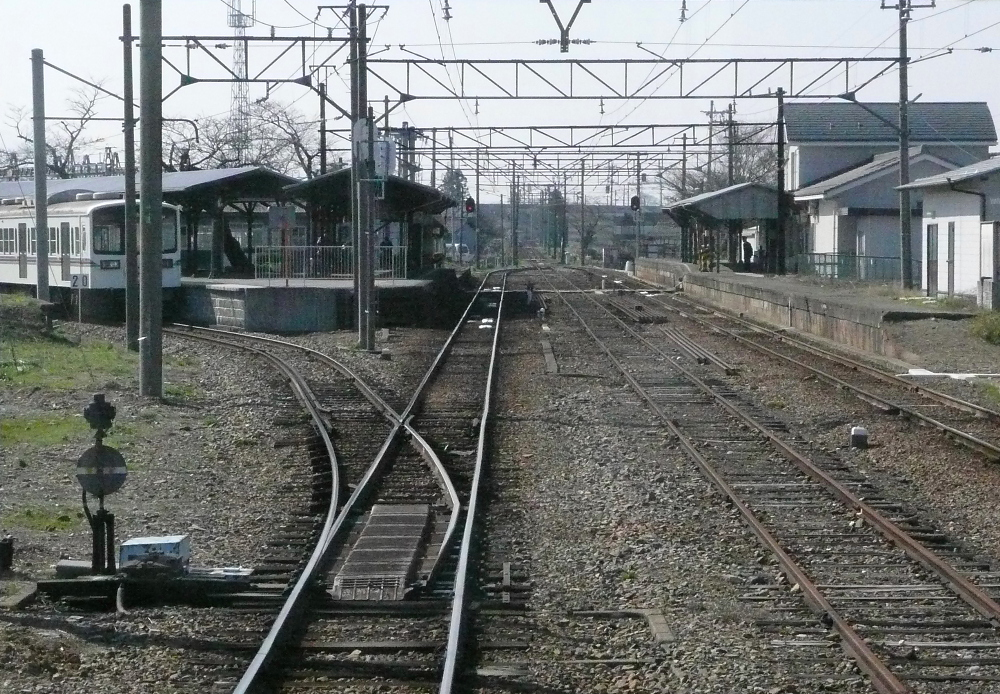
Platforms of Takamiya Station

Takamiya Station (高宮駅, Takamiya-eki) is a junction passenger railway station in located in the city of Hikone, Shiga Prefecture, Japan, operated by the private railway operator Ohmi Railway.

== Lines ==
Takamiya Station is served by the Ohmi Railway Main Line, and is located 9.9 rail kilometers from the terminus of the line at Maibara Station. It is also a terms for the 2.5 kilometer Ohmi Railway Taga Line to Taga Taisha-mae Station

== Station layout ==
The station consists of a side platform and an island platform, connected to the station building by a level crossing. The station building is unattended.

== Platform ==
1	■ Main Line (Hikone Taga-Taisha Line)	from Yokaichi for Hikone and Maibara
2	■ Main Line (Koto Ohmi Line)	for Yokaichi, Kibukawa and Ōmi-Hachiman
3	■ Main Line (Hikone Taga-Taisha Line)	from the Taga Line for Hikone and Maibara
3	■ Taga Line (Hikone Taga-Taisha Line)	for Taga Taisha-mae

== Adjacent stations ==
«	Service	»
Ohmi Railway Main Line
Hikone Taga-Taisha Line
Koto Ohmi Line
Hikoneguchi	-	Amago
Ohmi Railway Taga Line (Hikone Taga-Taisha Line)
Terminus	-	Screen

== History ==
Takamiya Station was opened on June 11, 1898. A new station building was completed in March 2002.The station was used as a setting for the 2012 movie Ace Attorney

== Passenger statistics ==
In fiscal 2019, the station was used by an average of 158 passengers daily (boarding passengers only).

== Surrounding area ==
- Hikone City Hall Takamiya Branch Office
- Hikone City Takamiya Elementary School
- Takamiya-juku

== See also ==
- List of railway stations in Japan
