= Rue21 =

American retailer of casual apparel

New rue21, LLC
- Logo used since 2003

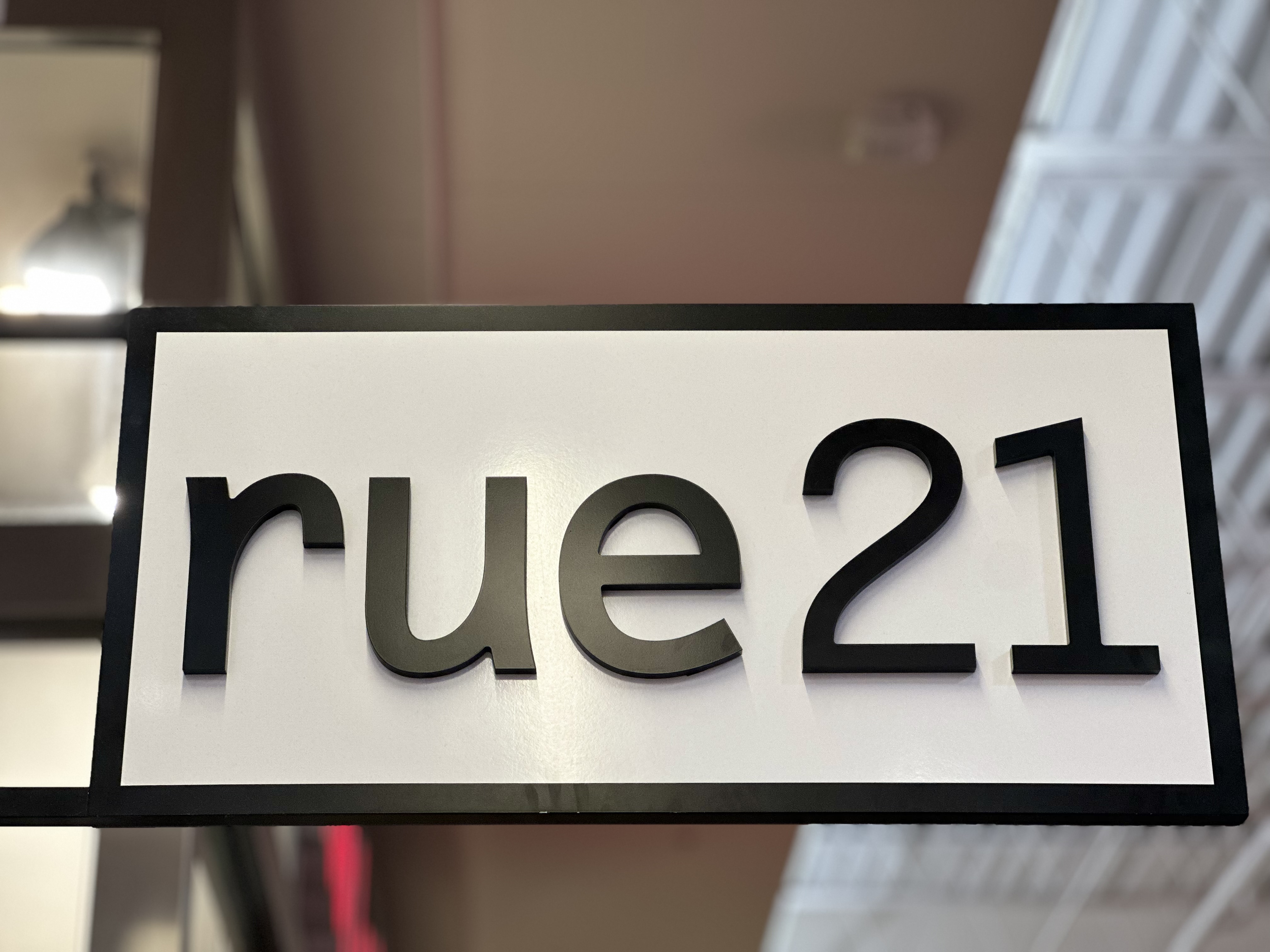
- Rue21 Signage - Store inside Southern Park Mall, Boardman, Ohio.
- Formerly: Pennsylvania Fashions (1970–2003)
- Type: Subsidiary
- Industry: Retail
- Founded: 1970; 56 years ago
- Founder: Cary Klein
- Headquarters: Warrendale, Pennsylvania
- Number of locations: 32 (as of July 26, 2024)
- Key people: Josh Burris (CEO)
- Products: Casual apparel and accessories
- Parent: YM Inc.
- Website: rue21.com

New rue21, LLC (rue21) is an American specialty retailer of women's & men's casual apparel and accessories headquartered in the Pittsburgh suburb of Warrendale, Pennsylvania. Their clothes are designed to appeal to people who desire, wish, or feel to be 21.

== Overview ==
In 2013, Apax Partners, a global private-equity firm, acquired the company by funds advised for $42.00 per share in cash. It filed for Chapter 11 bankruptcy protection on May 16, 2017.

In September 2017, the firm emerged from bankruptcy protection after its reorganization plan was confirmed by the U.S. Bankruptcy Court for the Western District of Pennsylvania. New owners include hedge funds BlueMountain Capital Management, Southpaw Asset Management and Pentwater Capital Management.

In June, 2024, two months after rue21 filed for bankruptcy again and was left with a website unsupportive, seven stores have resigned leases, as part of a stalking horse buyout from Canadian retailer YM, Inc., while the public assets were up for auction. The company has plans to reopen up to 120 stores within the coming months.

== History ==
The company was founded in 1970 as Pennsylvania Fashions Inc. The company operated stores under various brand names. Cary Klein purchased the company from his father in 1989 and later developed the rue21 concept. In February 2002, Pennsylvania Fashions filed for Chapter 11 bankruptcy protection. It was then that SKM emerged as the majority stakeholder three years after Klein sold a 50% stake to the Stamford, Connecticut-based investment firm. At the time, sales among the nearly 250 stores were thought to be between $180 and $200 million annually with approximately 1,800 employees.

The company exited Chapter 11 in May 2003 after undergoing voluntary reorganization, renamed as rue21, which had become the company's dominant store concept. It set out an ambitious plan to expand its 170 stores over the next five years. Their ability to expand into underserved markets was evident by the store growth from their 500th store in Harlingen, Texas on July 23, 2009, through November 14, 2013, when they opened their 1000th store in Enid, Oklahoma.

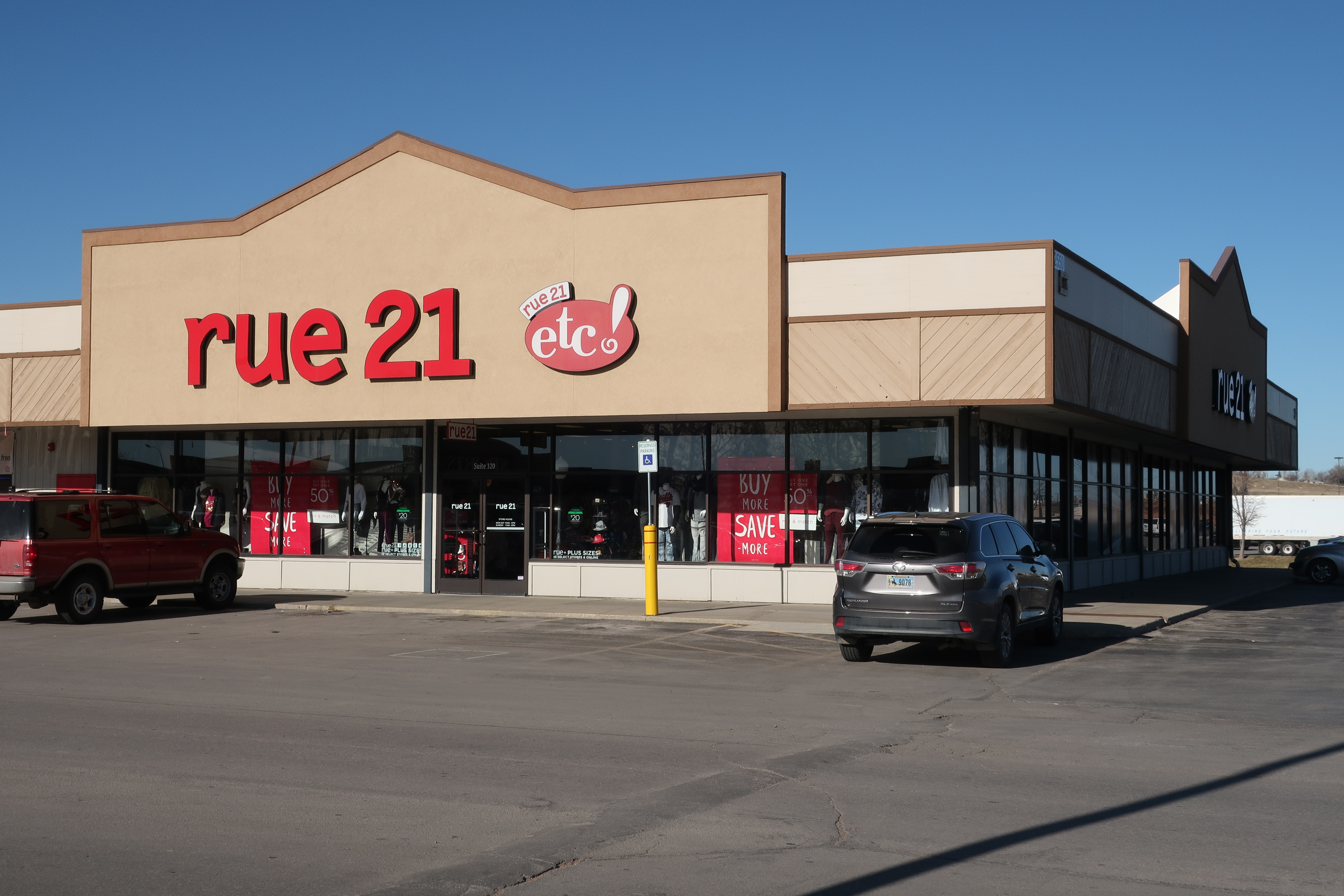
A rue21 in Gillette, Wyoming

rue21 continued its growth and expansion on March 17, 2011, by announcing that it would be doubling the size of its 189,000-square-foot (17,600 m^{2}) Distribution Center located in Weirton, West Virginia. This expansion occurred 12 months after a Distribution Center upgrade that included a new pack-to-light system as well as upgrades to the warehouse management system. CFO Keith McDonough stated, "The recently completed Distribution Center upgrades, including additional packing capacity, new systems and performance metrics, coupled with this planned expansion, gives us the ability to support our current stores and gives us the flexibility for our planned future growth." This upgrade was completed in June 2012.

In April 2017, rue21 announced plans to close around 400 stores, part of an American retail phenomenon of store closings known as the retail apocalypse. On May 16, 2017, rue21 filed for Chapter 11 bankruptcy protection, and emerged on September 22, 2017, after reorganization plan approval by the U.S. Bankruptcy Court for the Western District of Pennsylvania. "We are very pleased to have moved through the restructuring process in a relatively short period," CEO Melanie Cox said in a statement at the time of the plan's court confirmation.

In February 2020, rue21 shared that more of their branches would start offering plus sizes by the end of the first quarter of the year.

On May 1, 2024, rue21 filed for Chapter 11 bankruptcy for the third time, listing liabilities between $100 million and $500 million. The company has plans to sell itself during the procedure and will pursue a potential sale with any interested parties. As part of that plan, rue21 closed all of its remaining 540 stores nationwide. Liquidation sales began on May 3, and stores completed liquidation sales on or before May 30.

However, on June 29, 2024, YM, Inc. acquired Rue21's assets. YM also owns Charlotte Russe and Urban Planet. The company reopened 7 stores, all located in Tanger Outlets centers, with plans to reopen up to 120 stores within the coming months.

== Brands ==
rue21 offers both its own brands and others in its stores. Its website displays selected inventory that is available in their brick & mortar stores. As of November 2013, U.S.-based customers have been able to purchase merchandise off of the redesigned website, but as of 2025, that is no longer the case. In select stores rue21 also offered rueGuy, an expanded men's department with a more male-inspired layout, design, and fashion selection.

On November 6, 2014, rue21 began offering plus sizes for women, in various categories of merchandise, with their rue+ brand.
