= Screen Station =

Railway station in Hikone, Shiga Prefecture, Japan

Screen Station スクリーン駅
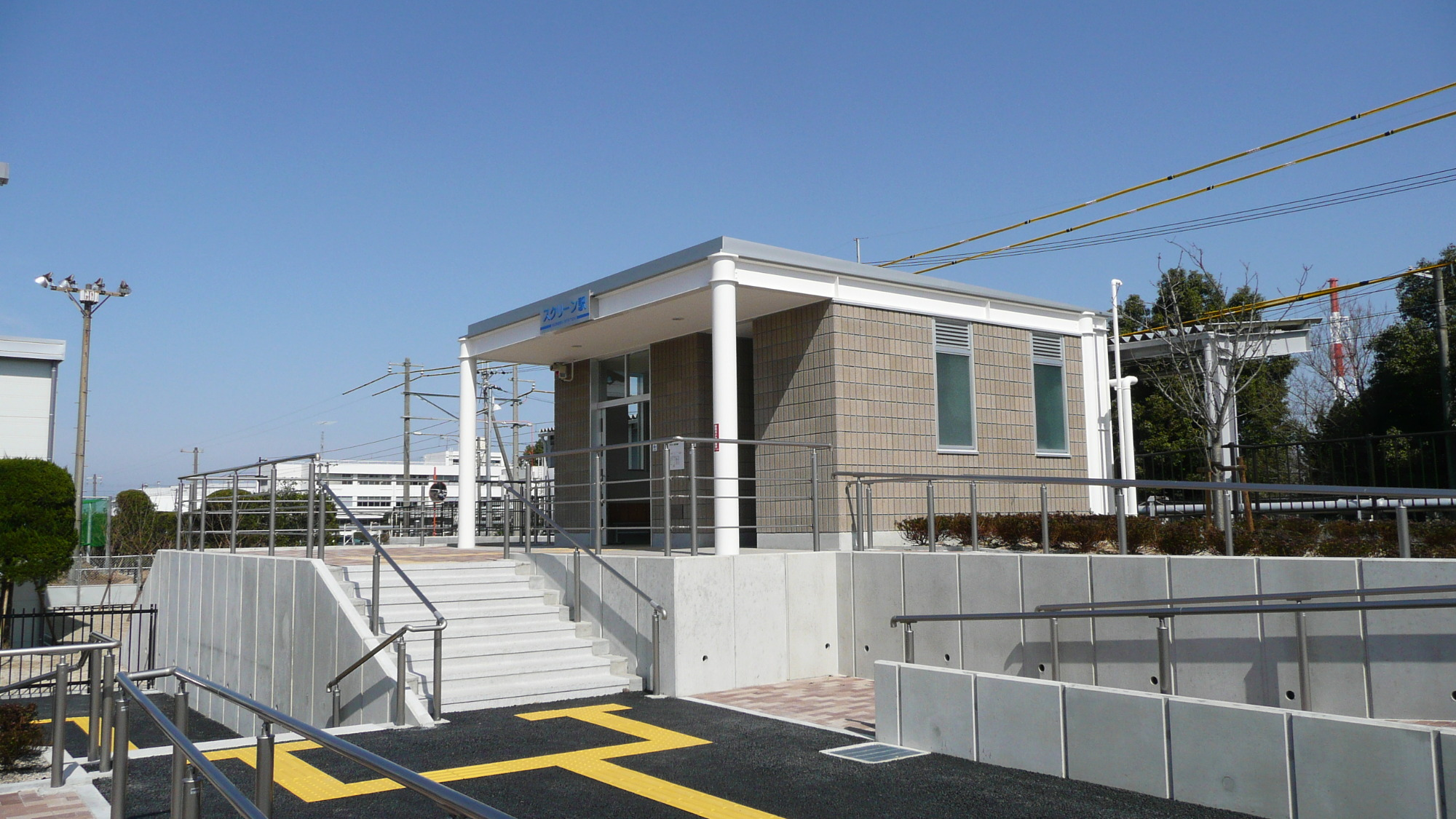
- Screen Station

General information
- Location: Takamiya-chō, Hikone-shi, Shiga-ken 522-0201; Japan
- Coordinates: 35°14′00″N 136°16′02″E
- Operator: Ohmi Railway
- Line: ■ Ohmi Railway Taga Line
- Distance: 0.8 km from Takamiya
- Platforms: 1 side platform

Other information
- Station code: OR08
- Website: Official website

History
- Opened: 15 March 2008

Passengers
- FY2019: 634 daily (boarding passengers only)
Location
- Location within Shiga Prefecture Location within Japan

Screen Station (スクリーン駅, Sukurīn-eki) is a passenger railway station in located in the city of Hikone, Shiga Prefecture, Japan, operated by the private railway operator Ohmi Railway. The station was named after Dainippon Screen Mfg. Co., Ltd., whose Hikone office the station serves.

== Lines ==
Screen Station is a station of the Ohmi Railway Taga Line, and is located 0.8 rail kilometers from the opposing terminus of the line at Takamiya Station.

== Station layout ==
The station consists of a single platform serving one track.. The station is unattended.

== History ==
Construction started on 5 December 2007, and the station opened on 15 March 2008.

== Passenger statistics ==
In fiscal 2019, the station was used by an average of 634 passengers daily (boarding passengers only).

== Adjacent stations ==
«	Service	»
Ohmi Railway Taga Line
Takamiya	Local	Taga Taisha-mae

== Surrounding area ==
- Dainippon Screen Mfg. Co., Ltd., Hikone office
- Bridgestone Hikone factory

== See also ==
- List of railway stations in Japan
