= Inukami River =

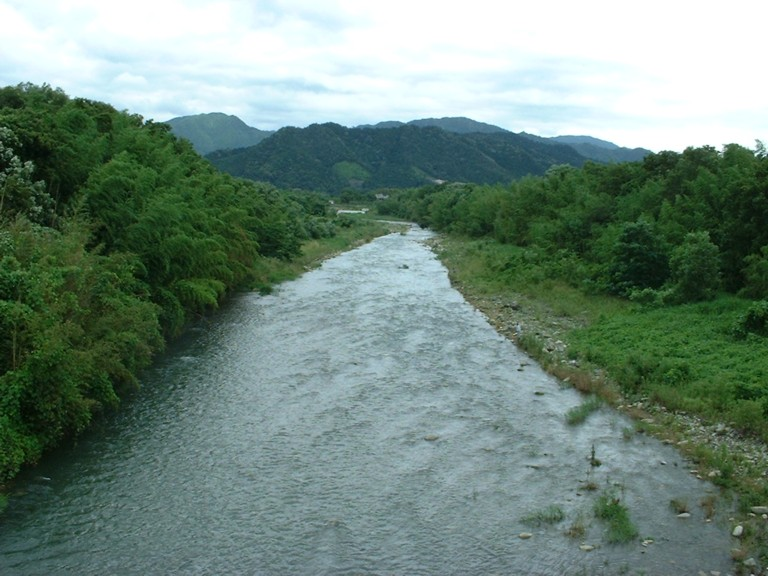

- Location within Japan
- Native name: 犬上川 (Japanese)

Location
- Country: Japan

Physical characteristics
- Source
  - location: Suzuka Mountains
- Mouth
  - location: Lake Biwa
- Length: 25 km (16 mi)
- Basin size: 110 km^{2} (42 sq mi)

Basin features
- River system: Yodo River

The Inukami River (犬上川, Inukami-gawa) has its source in the Suzuka Mountains in Shiga Prefecture, Japan. During the Edo period, Takamiya-juku, a post station along the Nakasendō, sat on the banks of the river in Hikone.

== Geography ==
The Kitaya River (北谷川 Kitaya-gawa) and the Minamiya River (南谷川 Minamiya-gawa), literally the "North Valley" and "South Valley" rivers, originate in the Suzuka Mountains. The two rivers merge as they flow into Taga. The river's central portion spreads out into an alluvial fan as it flows into a plain. When the river reaches Hikone, it flows into Lake Biwa.

== River communities ==
The river passes through or forms the boundary of the following communities:

Shiga Prefecture
Taga, Kōra, Hikone
