= Taqa, Iran =

Taqa طاقا
- Village
- Location within Iran
- Coordinates: 32°02′24″N 49°26′23″E
- Country: Iran
- Province: Khuzestan
- County: Andika
- Bakhsh: Abezhdan
- Rural District: Abezhdan

Population (2006)
  - Total: 64
- Time zone: UTC+3:30 (IRST)
  - Summer (DST): UTC+4:30 (IRDT)

Taqa (Persian: طاقا, also Romanized as Ţāqā; also known as Tagā) is a village in Abezhdan Rural District, Abezhdan District, Andika County, Khuzestan Province, Iran. At the 2006 census, its population was 64, in 15 families.
