= Printing Industries of America =

Logo of Printing Industries of America.

The Printing Industries of America was a nonprofit trade association that advocates for the United States printing industry.

It was the world’s largest graphic arts trade association, representing more than 6,500 member companies and an industry with more than $174.4 billion in revenue and one million employees. Its purpose was to provide representation, training, education, research, and publications to the printing industry.

== History ==
Established in 1887, it had no permanent headquarters until 1902 when an office opened in New York City. In 1908, the office was moved to Philadelphia; in 1912, it was moved to Chicago, where it remained until a move to Washington, DC in 1929.

In 1999, PIA consolidated with the Graphic Arts Technical Foundation becoming the Printing Industries of America/Graphic Arts Technical Foundation (PIA/GATF) and utilizing a logo that was a combination of the two independent organizations logos. In 2009, after an extensive re-branding initiative, the association changed its name to Printing Industries of America and unveiled a new logo. The Graphic Arts Technical Foundation activities are carried out under the auspices of the Center for Technology and Research.

On November 16, 2003, it was announced that the main headquarters would move to Sewickley, Pennsylvania, a suburb of Pittsburgh. The move was completed within a year.

In 2015, the main headquarters moved to Warrendale, Pennsylvania. It continues to have a lobbying presence in Washington.

In 2020, PIA merged with the Specialty Graphic Imaging Association to form the PRINTING United Alliance.
