= Takamiya-juku =

Pre-modern Japan post-station along highway

Takamiya-juku 高宮宿
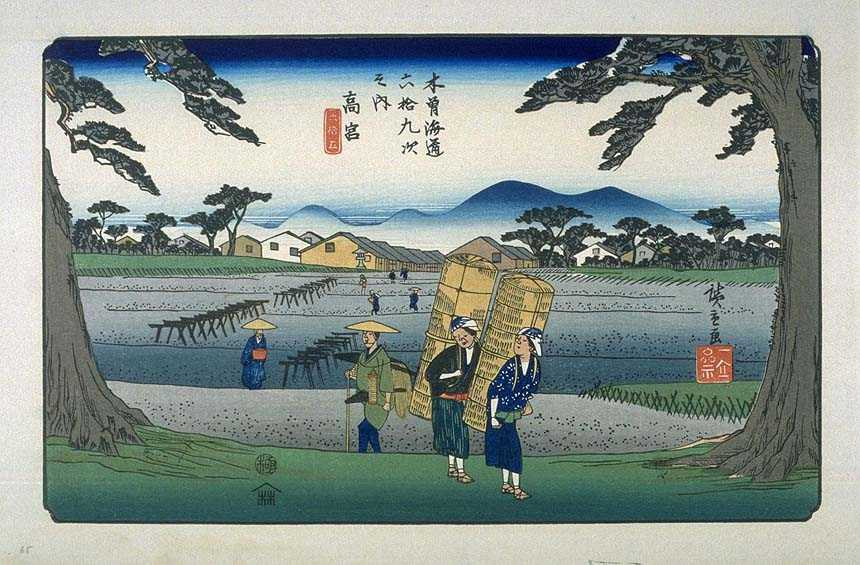
- Hiroshige's print of Takamiya-juku, part of the Sixty-nine Stations of the Kiso Kaidō series

General information
- Location: Hikone, Shiga (former Ōmi Province); Japan
- Coordinates: 35°14′08.1″N 136°15′24″E
- Elevation: 108 m (354 ft)
- System: post station
- Line: Nakasendō
- Distance: 474 km from Edo
Location
- Location within Shiga Prefecture Location within Japan

Takamiya-juku (高宮宿, Takamiya-juku) was the sixty-fourth of the sixty-nine stations of the Nakasendō highway connecting Edo with Kyoto in Edo period Japan. It was located in the present-day city of Hikone, Shiga Prefecture, Japan, on the right bank of the Inukami River.

== History ==
Takamiya-juku has a very long history, and was a market town in front of the gates of the Shinto shrine of Taga Taisha from the end of the Nara period onwards. It was located on the ancient Tōsandō highway connecting the capital of Heian-kyō with the provinces of eastern Japan and from the early Sengoku period was a popular stopping point for pilgrims. The old stone torii gate (constructed in 1635) is still a landmark of Takamiya-juku. It is a Prefectural Important Cultural Property. In the early Edo period, the system of post stations on the Nakasendō was formalized by the Tokugawa shogunate in 1602, and it was a stopping place for traveling merchants (Ōmi shōnin (近江商人)) who originated from Ōmi Province. It was also on the sankin-kōtai route by the Kishū Tokugawa clan and other western daimyō en route to-and-from the Shogun's court in Edo. The area was known for its production of a striped hemp cloth, which was sold throughout Japan and which was also given as tribute from Hikone Domain to the Shogun's court in Edo.

Per the 1843 "中山道宿村大概帳" (Nakasendō Shukuson Taigaichō) guidebook issued by the Inspector of Highways (道中奉行, Dōchu-būgyō), the town had a population of 3560 people in 835 houses, including one honjin, two waki-honjin, and 23 hatago, and was thus this largest of the stations in Ōmi Province. Most of the women were listed as working in textile production, and the men as either in hemp harvesting or sales. Takamiya-juku is 474 kilometers from Edo and 64 kilometers from Kyoto.

== Modern Takamiya-juku ==
Takamiya-juku is southeast of the current center of Hikone. The post town once existed for 800 meters along the road; however, most has been redeveloped with modern buildings. The front gate of the honjin has been preserved, and a number of the late Edo period to early Meiji period merchant houses with their characteristic black walls, "insect-cage window" on the mezzanine floor, and lattice work, still survive.

== Takamiya-juku in The Sixty-nine Stations of the Kiso Kaidō ==
Utagawa Hiroshige's ukiyo-e print of Takamiya-juku dates from 1835 -1838. The print depicts the post station from the opposite bank of the Inukami River, which has all but dried up in the dry season. For some reason, the bridge across the river has been dismantled, and only the trestles remain. In the foreground are two women with huge cylindrical bundles of straw on their banks.These bundles contain silk moth cocoons. The woman to the rear is wearing blue-patterned clothing in the "Takamiya stripes", which was the local speciality. Behind her is a samurai with a walking stick, a monk with a begging bowl and several other figures in the river bed. On the opposite bank of the river are tall stone lanterns which mark the crossing point. The Suzuka Mountains are depicted in blue in the background. The roofs of the buildings of the town are wooden shingles rather than thatch, indicating the relative prosperity of the town.

== Gallery ==
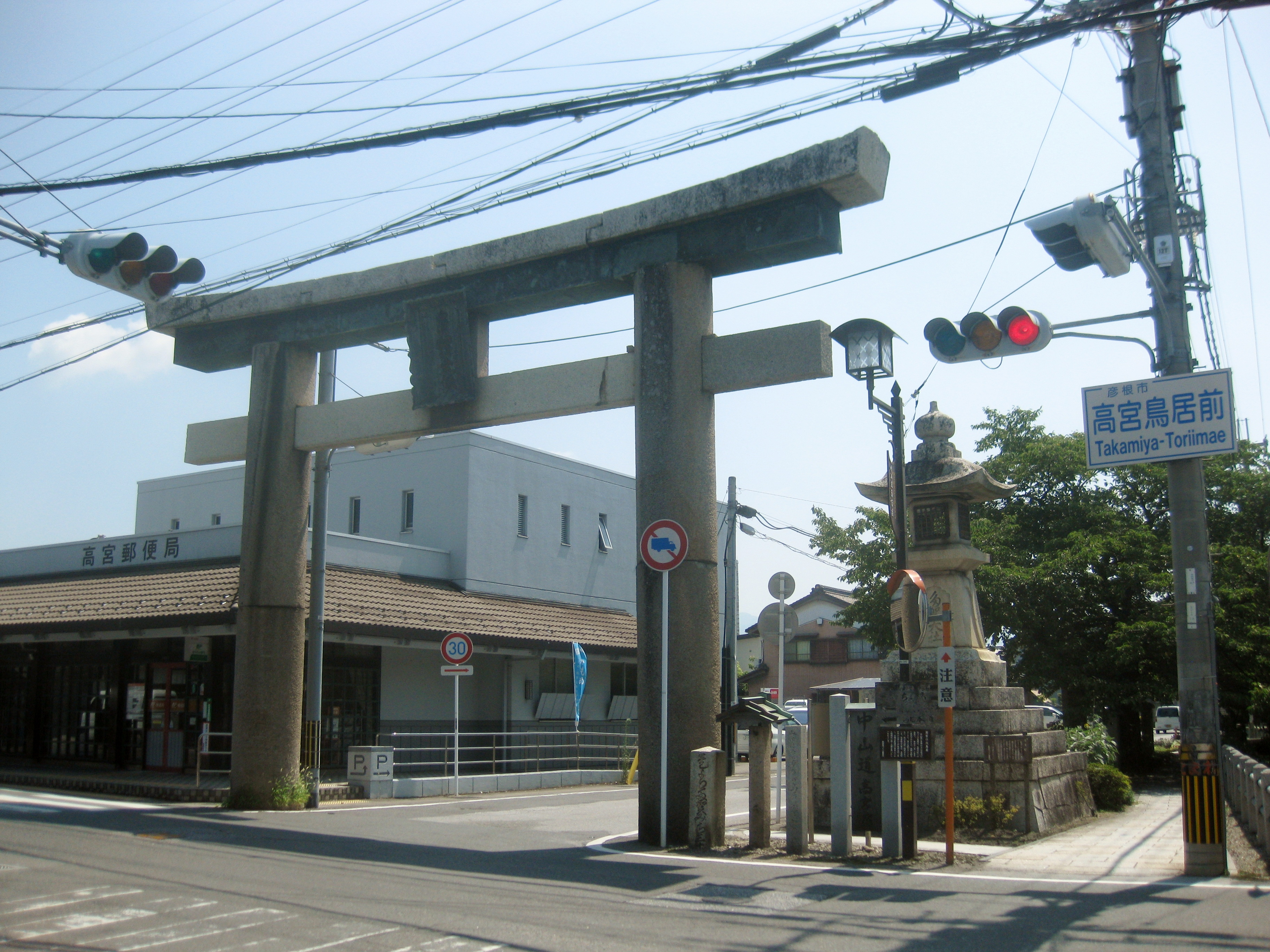
First Torii of Taga Taisha

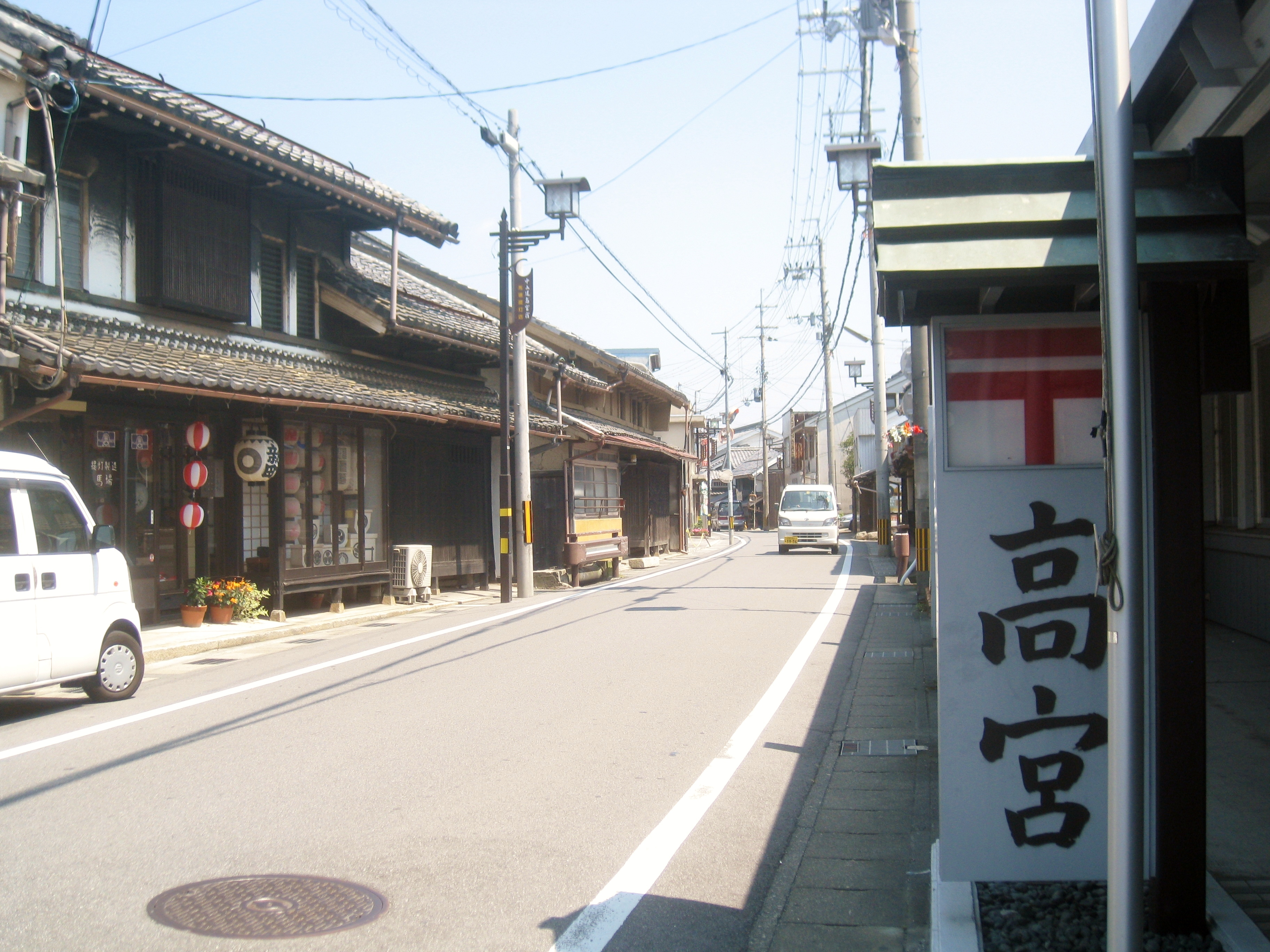
Surviving old buildings of Takamiya-juku

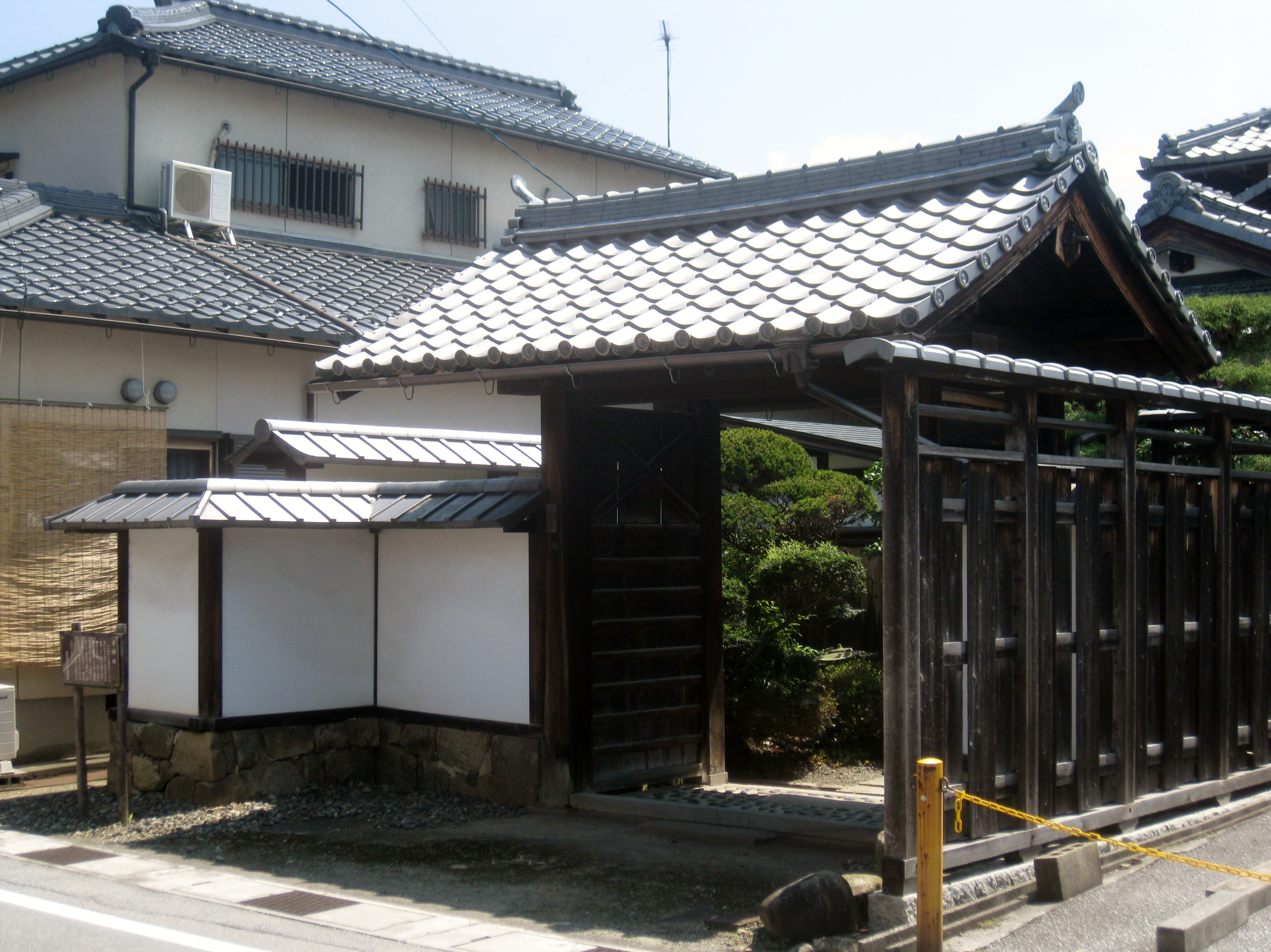
Gate of Takamiya-juku honjin

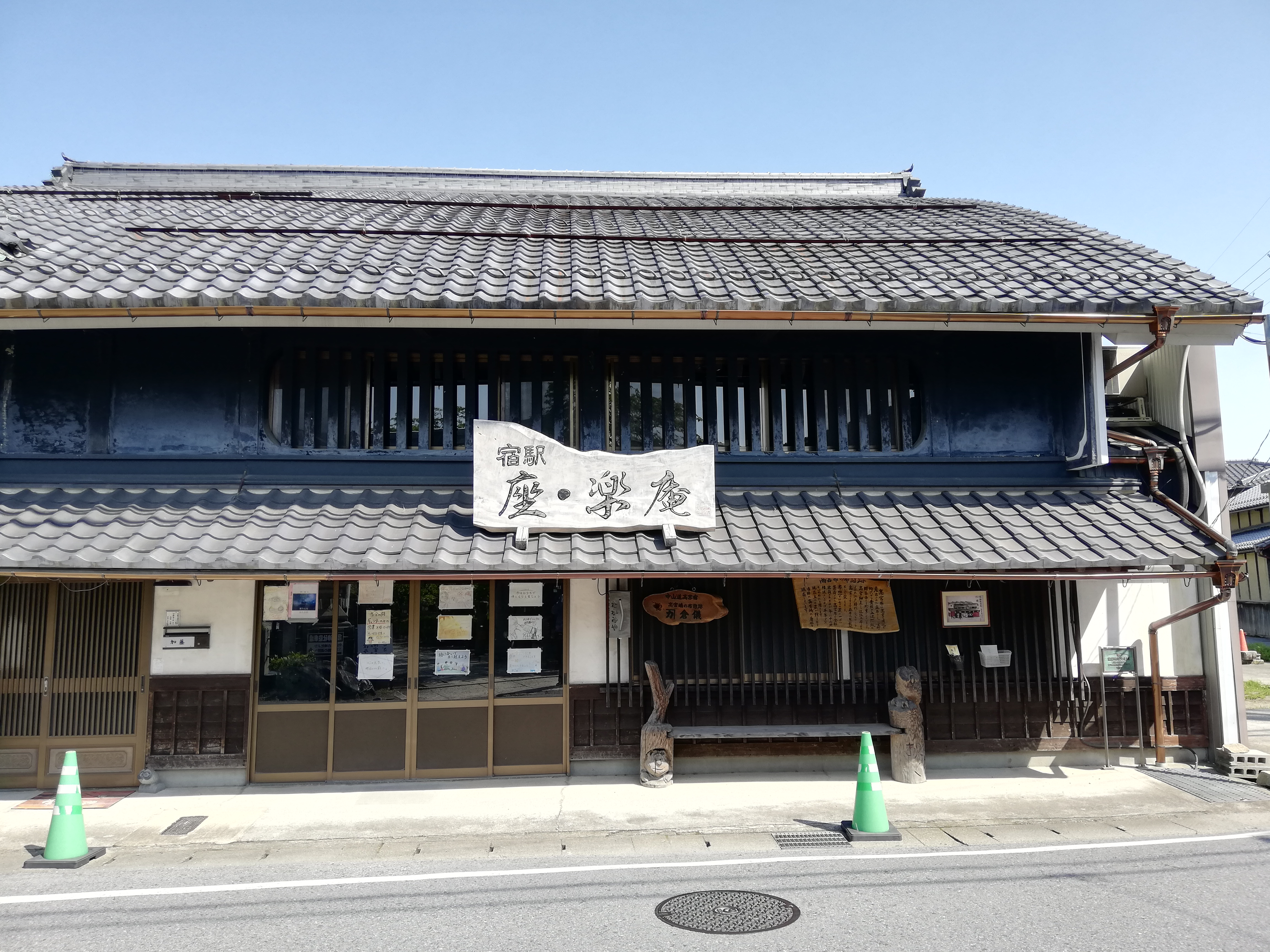
Kato house in Takamiya-juku

== Neighboring post towns ==
Nakasendō
Toriimoto-juku - Takamiya-juku - Echigawa-juku
