= Warrendale, Pennsylvania =

Unincorporated community in Pennsylvania, US

- Unincorporated community
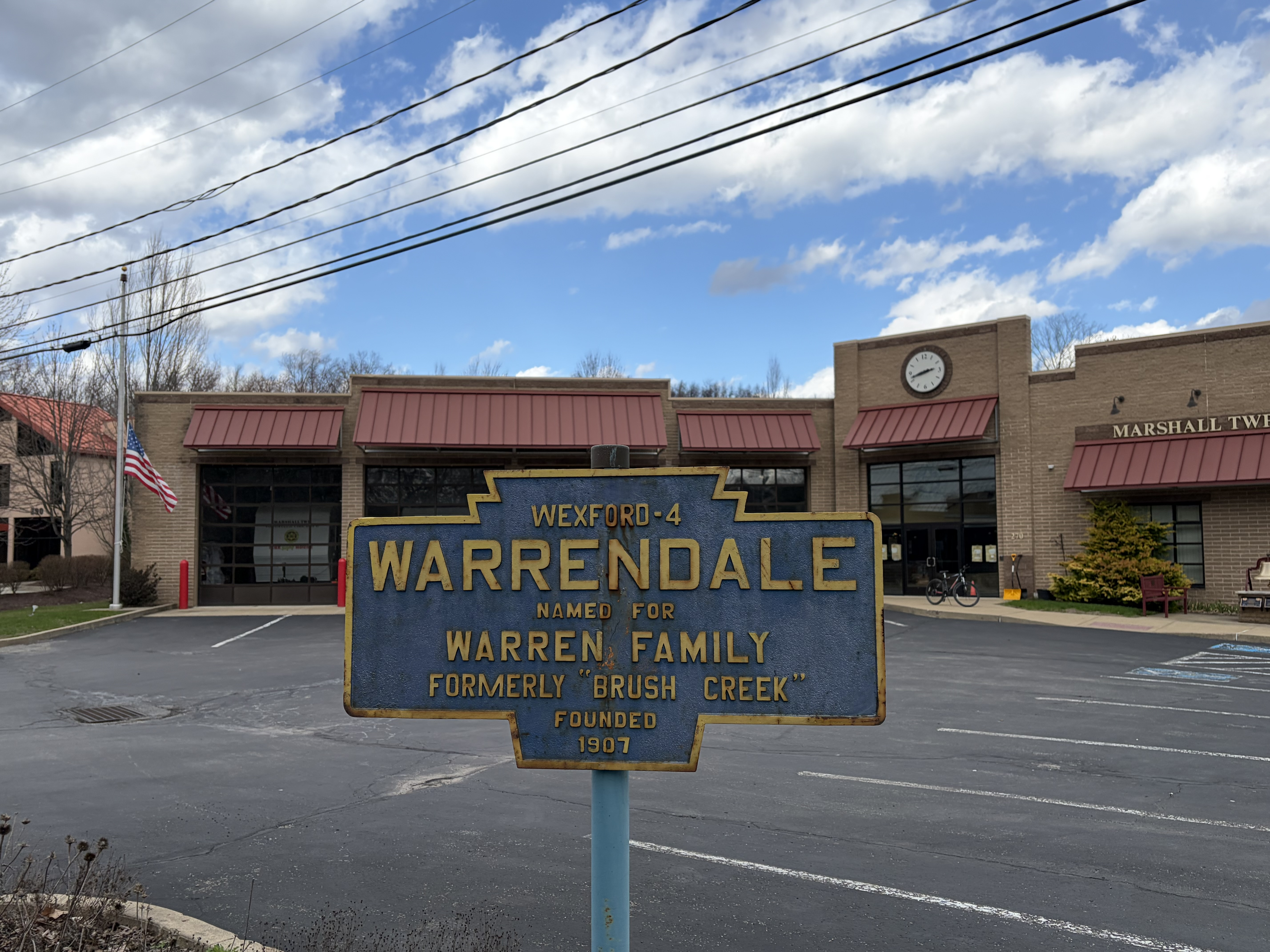
- Warrendale originally called Brush Creek sign outside of Marshall Township volunteer fire department

- Location within Pennsylvania Location within the United States
- Coordinates: 40°39′12″N 80°4′46″W
- Country: United States
- State: Pennsylvania
- County: Allegheny
- Township: Marshall
- Elevation: 1,066 ft (325 m)
- Time zone: UTC-5 (Eastern (EST))
  - Summer (DST): UTC-4 (EDT)
- ZIP code: 15086
- Area code: 724
- GNIS feature ID: 1190600

Warrendale (originally founded as Brush Creek) is a northern suburb of Pittsburgh, Pennsylvania, United States. It is located in the northwestern corner of Allegheny County. It is the home to the corporate headquarters of Joy Mining Machinery, Printing Industries of America and SAE International, as well as the United States Postal Service Pittsburgh Network Distribution Center, one of 21 such mail delivery hubs in the country. Originally founded as Brush Creek, it was renamed to Warrendale in 1907, after the local Warren family that originally resided there in the late 1700s.

It was the home to one of American Eagle Outfitters' four North American distribution centers, before it closed.

It was the home to the corporate headquarters of rue21 before they closed in 2024.
