= Aigo no Waka =

1661 Japanese jōruri piece by Yamamoto Kuhē

Aigo no Waka (あいごの若) is the title of a Japanese jōruri piece—specifically a sekkyō-setsu—in six dan. It was first published in Kyoto in early 1661 by Yamamoto Kuhē, and may have originally been written by Higurashi Kodayū.

== Authorship, publication and date ==
Aigo no Waka was first published in Kyoto in early 1661 by Yamamoto Kuhē (山本九兵衛), and may have originally been written by Higurashi Kodayū (日暮小太夫).

== Genre and structure ==
It is a jōruri piece—specifically a sekkyō-setsu—in six dan (段, "parts").

== Plot ==
In the first dan, the Second Avenue Archivist Kiyohira (二条蔵人清平) goes with his wife to pray to the Hase Kannon for a child, his childlessness having been a source of shame for him at a palace meeting to compare treasures.

In the second dan, the Sixth Avenue Captain (六条の判官), who dislikes Kiyohira, attacks him on his return from the temple, but thanks to the judgement of a monk he escapes without incident. (Yatarō Muroki, in his article on Aigo no Waka for the Nihon Koten Bungaku Daijiten, speculated that this section was not present in the original performance.)

In the third dan, a child (Aigo no Waka) is born to the couple, but when Aigo no Waka is thirteen his mother dies. Waka's young stepmother falls in love with him, and writes him a romantic letter. The fourth dan has Waka taking refuge in the jibutsudō to mourn his mother. His stepmother sends him seven love letters a day but Waka firmly rejects her. The stepmother slanders Waka to her husband, and the boy is tied up and hung from a cherry tree. The ghost of Waka's dead mother takes the form of a weasel and saves him. She tells him to seek the help of his uncle, the Ajari (monk) of Hiei-zan.

In the fifth dan, Ajari, who believes this sudden visit must be a trick by a tengu, drives Waka out. Waka, continuing to encounter misfortune, loses faith in the world and kills himself, leaving the death poem kamikura ya / kiriyū ga taki he / mi o naguru / katari-tsutae yo / sugi no mura tatsu (かみくらや霧生が滝へ身を投ぐる語り伝へよ杉のむら立).

In the final dan, Kiyohira discovers Waka's death and accuses the stepmother of his death. Kiyohira, Ajari, Waka's pet monkey and many other people leap to their deaths, and Waka is worshiped as Sannō Dai-Gongen (ja).

== Analysis ==
The work as a whole is an engi associated with the Hiyoshi Taisha. It has been noted that the legends of the Semimaru Shrine (蟬丸の宮) near Ōtsu, which was a site of reverence for the performers of these jōruri sermon, were likely used as a source for the story. There was likely an earlier version of the story that did not have section divisions and functioned more explicitly as a sermon, which in the surviving text was converted to be more "jōruri-like".

It is one of few examples of a work in which a stepmother falls in love with her stepson, and Muroki interprets her resentment of her stepson for rejecting her as an example of stepchild abuse.

== Influence ==
As Aigo no Waka Mono (愛護若物) the story had a significant influence on later jōruri and kabuki plays.

== Works cited ==
- Muroki, Yatarō (1983). "Aigo no Waka". Nihon Koten Bungaku Daijiten 日本古典文学大辞典 (in Japanese). Vol. 1. Tokyo: Iwanami Shoten. p. 3. OCLC 11917421.
