= Taga (surname) =

Taga is the surname of the following people:

- Imaye Taga (born 1985), Ethiopian-born Israeli footballer
- Mosese Taga (born 1964), Fijian rugby union player
- Nicolae Țaga (born 1967), Romanian rower
- Savenaca Taga, Fijian rugby league player
- Tamiyo Taga, Indian politician
- Taga Takatada (1425–1486), Japanese military leader

== See also ==
- Tyagi
