= Yamashiro-Taga Station =

Railway station in Ide, Kyoto Prefecture, Japan

Yamashiro-Taga Station 山城多賀駅
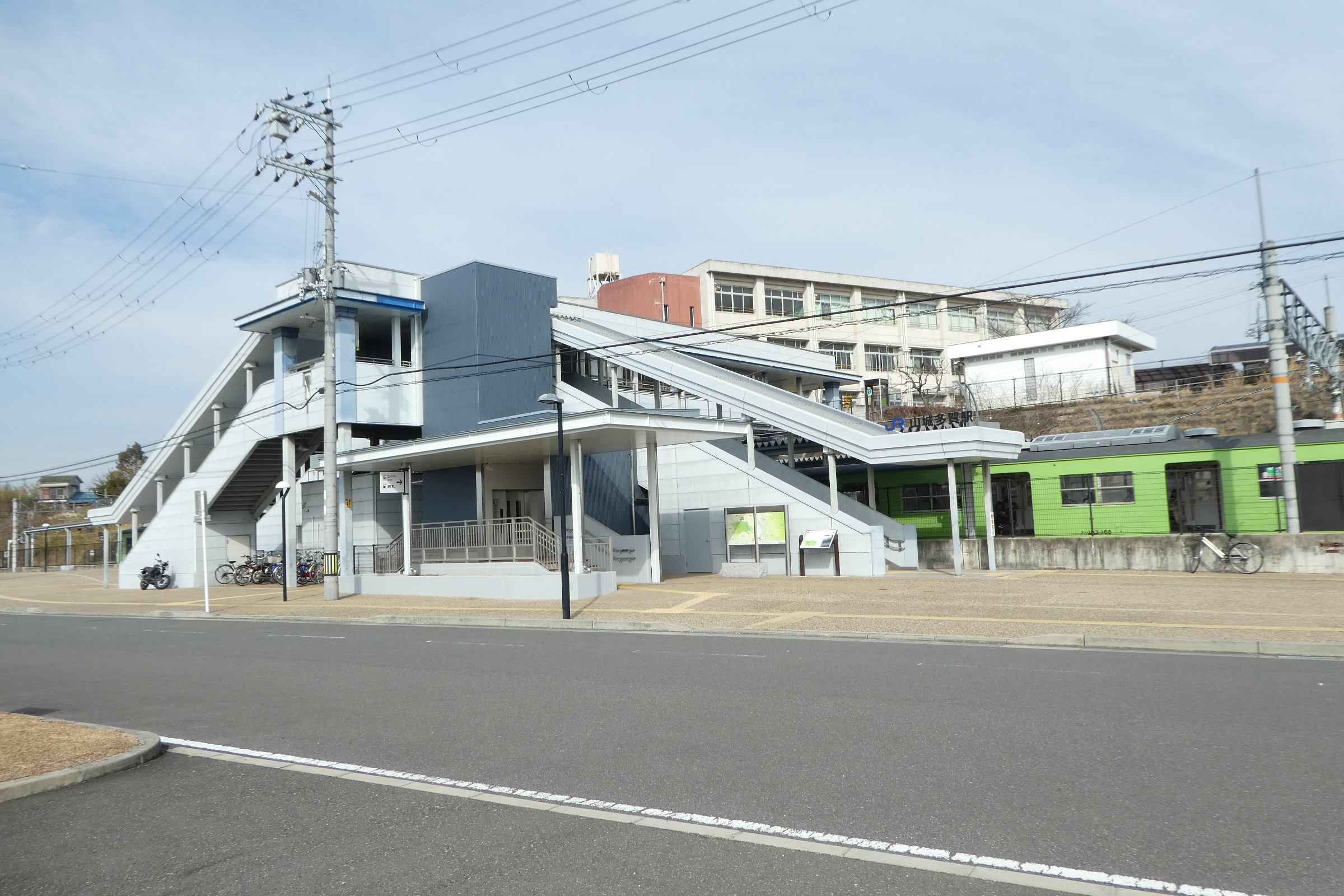
- Yamashiro-Taga Station in February 2018

General information
- Location: 49, Ōaza Taga Koaza Uchigaito, Ide-cho, Tsuzuki-gun, Kyoto-fu 610-0301; Japan
- Coordinates: 34°49′04″N 135°48′22″E
- Operator: JR West
- Line: D Nara Line
- Distance: 9.4 km (5.8 miles) from Kizu
- Platforms: 2 side platforms
- Tracks: 2

Construction
- Structure type: Elevated
- Accessible: Yes

Other information
- Status: Unstaffed
- Station code: JR-D15
- Website: Official website

History
- Opened: 15 July 1955

Passengers
- FY 2023: 804 daily

Services
Preceding station	JR West	Following station
Yamashiro-Aodani towards Kyoto	Nara Line	Tamamizu towards Nara
Location
- Location within Kyoto Prefecture Location within Japan

Yamashiro-Taga Station (山城多賀駅, Yamashiro-Taga-eki) is a passenger railway station located in the town of Ide, Tsuzuki District, Kyoto Prefecture, Japan, operated by West Japan Railway Company (JR West).

== Lines ==
Yamashiro-Taga Station is served by the Nara Line and is located at 9.4 km (5.8 miles) from the terminus of the line at Kizu and 16.4 kilometers from Nara.

== Layout ==
The station consists of two side platforms connected by an elevated station building. The station is unattended. A ticket machine is installed at the station. The IC card ticket "ICOCA" can be used at this station.

=== Platforms ===
1	■ D Nara Line	for Uji and Kyoto
2	■ D Nara Line	for Nara

== History ==
Yamashiro-Taga was opened on 15 July 1955. With the privatization of Japanese National Railways (JNR) on 1 April 1987, the station came under the control of JR West. Station numbering was introduced in March 2018 with Yamashiro-Taga being assigned station number JR-D15.

== Passenger statistics ==
According to the Kyoto Prefecture statistical report, the average number of passengers per day is as follows.

Year	Passengers
1999	477
2000	455
2001	455
2002	416
2003	395
2004	389
2005	389
2006	397
2007	402
2008	386
2009	389
2010	392
2011	393
2012	399
2013	422
2014	395
2015	418
2016	433
2017	453
2018	433
2019	448

== Surrounding area ==
- Ide Town Taga Elementary School

== See also ==
- List of railway stations in Japan
