= Taga-taisha =

Shinto shrine in Taga, Japan

Taga-taisha 多賀大社
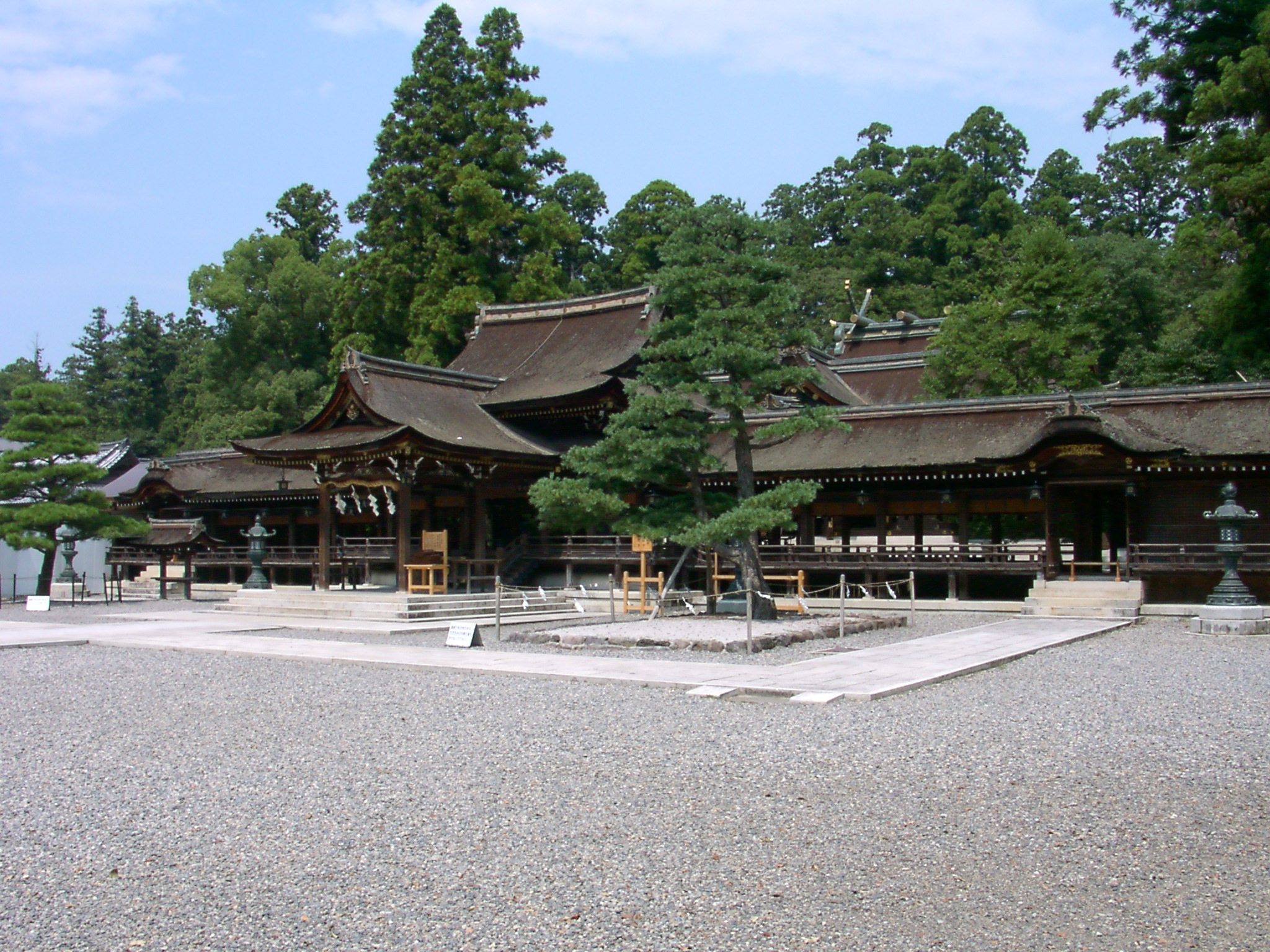
- Honden of Taga-taisha

- Location within Shiga Prefecture Location within Japan

Religion
- Affiliation: Shinto
- Deity: Izanagi, Izanami

Location
- Location: 604 Taga, Inukami-gun, Shiga-ken 522-0341
- Interactive map of Taga-taisha 多賀大社
- Coordinates: 35°13′27″N 136°17′26″E

Architecture
- Established: Pre-Nara period

Website
- www.tagataisya.or.jp

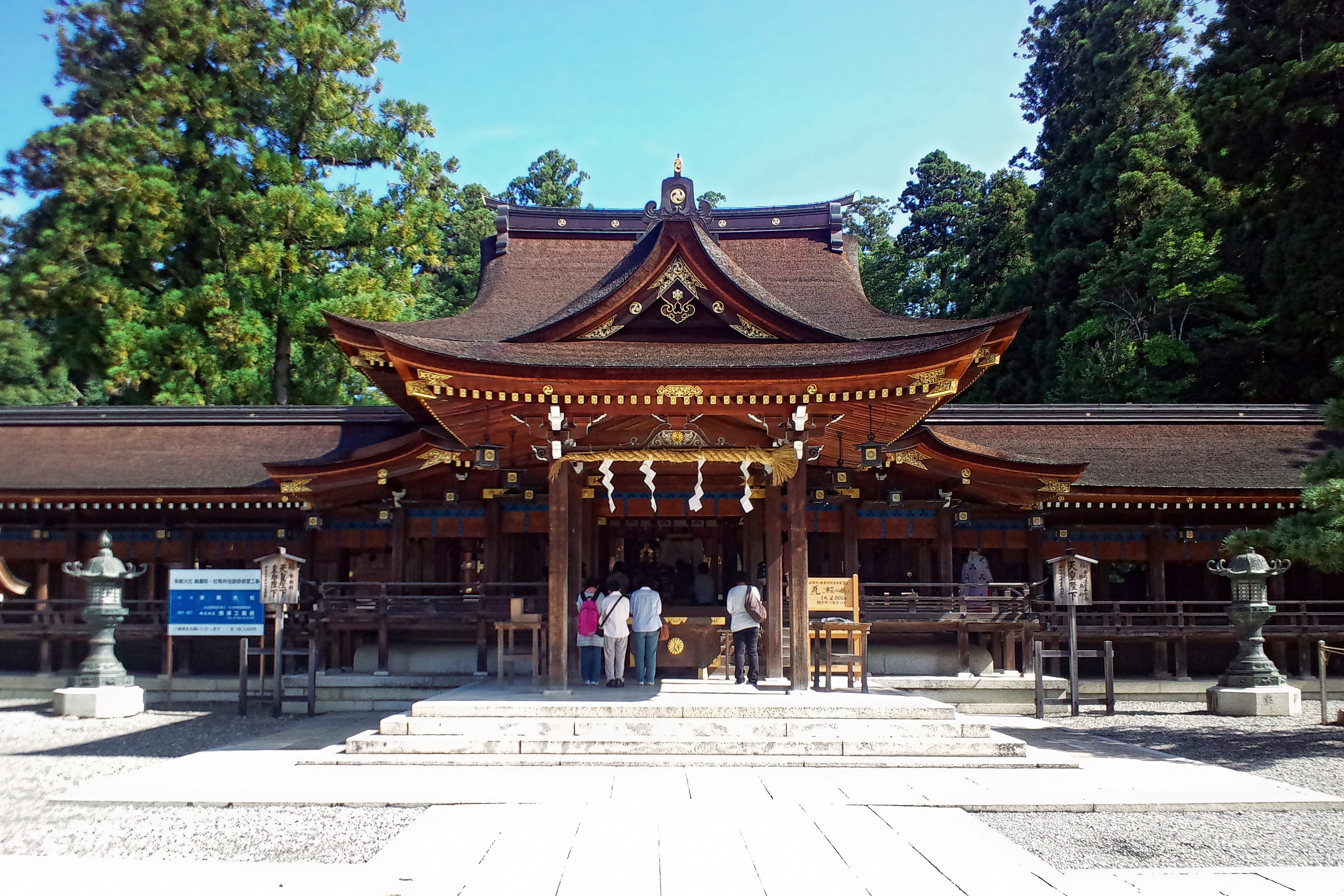
Haiden

Taga-taisha (多賀大社) is a Shinto shrine located in the town of Taga, Inukami District, Shiga Prefecture, Japan. The shrine is frequently referred to as O-Taga-san (お多賀さん) by local residents. The gardens of the inner shoin, which date to the Momoyama period are a nationally designated Place of Scenic Beauty, whereas the mid-Edo period Shoin itself is a Shiga Prefectural Important Cultural Property.

== Main kami ==
- Izanagi
- Izanami

== History ==
The foundation of Taga Taisha is unknown. It is mentioned in the ancient Kojiki and Nihon Shoki chronicles from 712 AD. The shrine's legend connects it with the legendary hero Yamato Takeru, whose son, Inugami no Mitasuki was sent as an emissary to Sui China in 614 AD and the first Japanese embassy to Tang China in 630 AD. He was also the ancestor of the Inukami clan, from which Inukami District, Shiga (where the shrine is located) takes its name. However, in the 914 AD Engishiki records, it is listed only as a small shrine. From the Heian period it was revered as having efficiency for childbirth, vocational aid, fire extinguishing and longevity. During the Muromachi period, as pilgrimages to the Ise Grand Shrine and the Kumano Sanzan gained in popularity, pilgrims were encouraged to visit Taga Shrine as part of the route. In the Sengoku period, Toyotomi Hideyoshi had a strong faith in this shrine and frequently prayed for an extension of his mother's life. He donated 10,000 koku, or the equivalent revenue of one year for a daimyō for its reconstruction and upkeep.

The shrine was destroyed by a fire in 1615, but was rebuilt immediately by Shogun Tokugawa Hidetada and reconstructed in 1633 by Tokugawa Iemitsu. In 1651, Ii Naotaka of Hikone Domain granted it estates of 150 koku for its upkeep. However, much of the shrine was destroyed again by fire in 1733, and by a storm in 1791. Each time, it was rebuilt with the assistance of the Tokugawa shogunate and Hikone Domain.

With the establishment of State Shinto following the Meiji restoration, the shrine was designated a prefectural shrine under the Modern system of ranked Shinto shrines in 1871. It was promoted to a Kanpei Chūsha (官幣中社, Imperial shrine, 2nd rank) in 1885 and to a Kanpei-taisha (官幣大社, Imperial shrine, 1st rank) in 1914.

Many of the shrine's buildings are Registered Tangible Cultural Properties of Taga Town.

== Festivals ==
- Korei-taisai (古例大祭): Most important festival held on April 22. Also known as Taga-matsuri (多賀まつり).
- Otaue-sai (御田植祭): A festival of planting rice with traditional rites held on June 7.
- Mantō-sai (万灯祭): A lantern festival held on the night of August 3–5.

== Specialty goods ==
- Otaga-shakushi (お多賀杓子): A talisman shakushi (Japanese ladle) from the reign of Empress Genshō. Allegedly the origin of the Japanese word otamajakushi.
- Itokiri-mochi (糸切餅): A Japanese sweet made of mochi sticky rice sold at souvenir shops around the shrine. Itokiri-mochi was first made to celebrate the Japanese victory over the Mongols.

== Access ==
The shrine is about a 20 minute walk from Taga Taisha-mae Station on the Ohmi Railway Taga Line, or about ten minutes by bus from Minami-Hikone Station on the JR West Biwako Line.

== See also ==
- Takamiya-juku, the closest of the 69 Stations of the Nakasendō to the shrine
