= Ohmi Railway Taga Line =

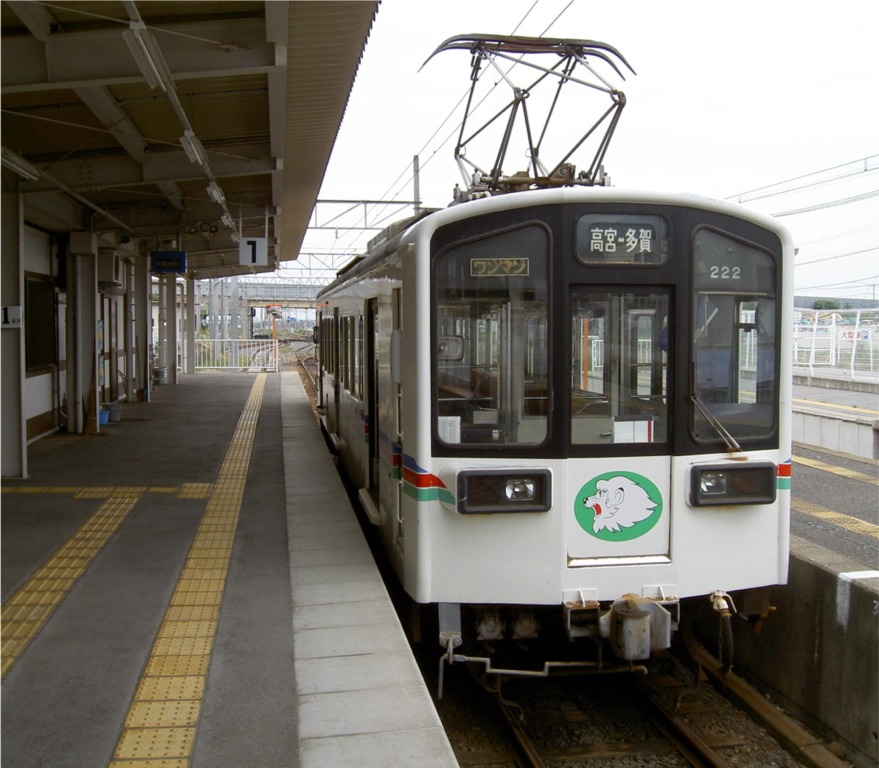
- 220 series electric car at Taga Taisha-mae Station (October 2006)

Overview
- Native name: 近江鉄道多賀線
- Termini: Takamiya; Taga Taisha-mae
- Stations: 3
- Website: http://www.ohmitetudo.co.jp

Service
- Type: Commuter rail
- Operator: Ohmi Railway

History
- Opened: 8 March 1914

Technical
- Line length: 2.5 km (1.6 mi)
- Track gauge: 1,067 mm (3 ft 6 in)
- Electrification: 1,500 V DC

The Ohmi Railway Taga Line (近江鉄道多賀線, Ōmi Tetsudō Taga-sen) is a regional railway line in Shiga Prefecture operated by Ohmi Railway. It connects Hikone city and Taga town.

The single-track line is 2.5-kilometre (1.6 mi) long, connecting Takamiya on the Main Line in Hikone to Taga Taisha-mae in Taga. It is electrified at 1,500 V DC, and the track gauge is 1,067 mm (3 ft 6 in).

== History ==
- 8 March 1914: Line opens.
- 12 March 1925: Line is electrified at 600 VDC, this is being increased to 1500 VDC in 1928 in conjunction with the voltage increase on the Main Line.
- October 1943: Services to Tsuchida Station (between Takamiya and Taga) suspended.
- October 1953: Tsuchida Station is closed.
- 11 May 1976: Driver-only operation commences.
- 1 April 1998: Taga Station renamed Taga Taisha-mae Station.
- 15 March 2008: Screen Station opens.

== Rolling stock ==
- 220 series single-car EMUs

== Stations ==
| No. | Station | Japanese | Distance (km) | Connections | Location | |
|---|---|---|---|---|---|---|
| OR-07 | Takamiya | 高宮 | 0.0 | Ohmi Railway Main Line | Hikone | Shiga Prefecture |
| OR-08 | Screen | スクリーン | 0.8 | | Hikone | Shiga Prefecture |
| OR-09 | Taga Taisha-mae | 多賀大社前 | 2.5 | | Taga | Shiga Prefecture |

== Attractions along the line ==
- Taga-taisha shrine
  - Taga Line was built for worshippers of Taga Taisha shrine.
- Kirin Brewery Company Shiga Factory
- Bridgestone Hikone Factory
- Dainippon Screen Mfg (Electronics company) Hikone Area Office
- Maruho (Pharmaceutical company) Hikone Factory

== See also ==
- List of railway lines in Japan
