= Inukami District, Shiga =

District in Shiga prefecture, Japan

Coordinates: 35.204°N 136.334°E

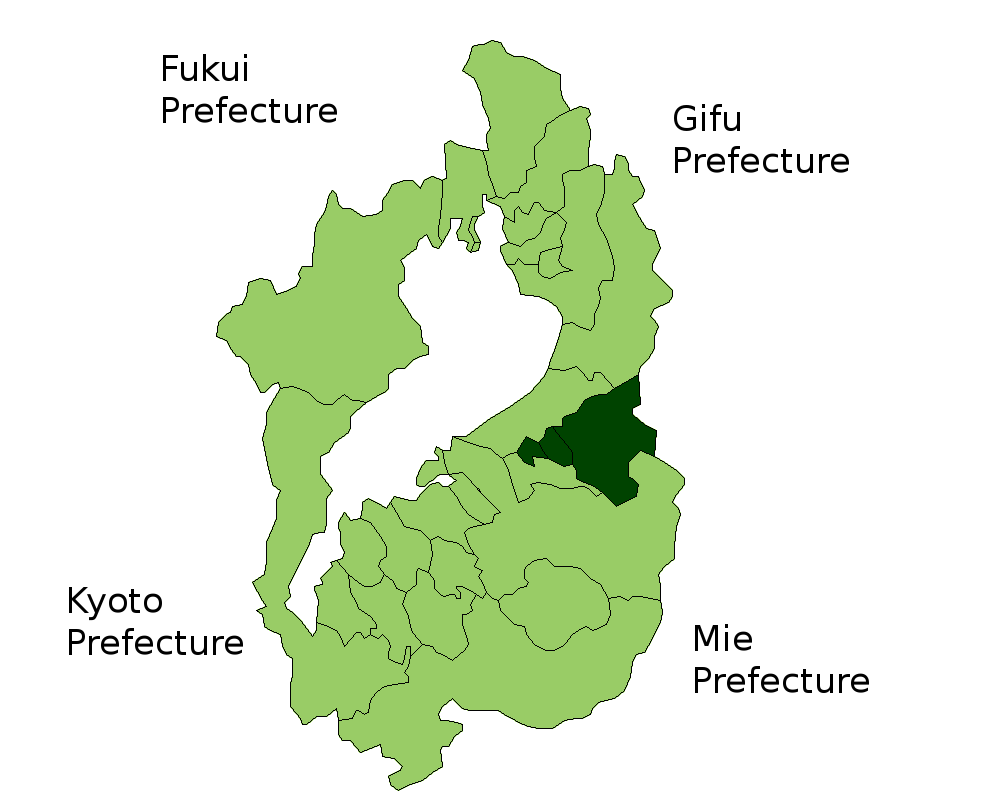
Map of Inukami District in Shiga Prefecture

Inukami (犬上郡, Inukami-gun) is a district located in Shiga Prefecture, Japan.

As of 2020, the district has an estimated population of 20,768 and a density of 132.1 persons per km^{2}. The total area is 157.2 km^{2}.

== Towns ==
- Kōra
- Taga
- Toyosato

== Transition ==
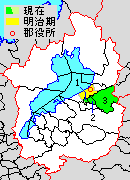
Map of Inukami District with Meiji period (1890) area in yellow, modern area in green.

Light blue autonomies are Inukami District's town, deep blue autonomies are Inukami District's village, and gray autonomies are others.

| April 1, 1889 | 1889 - 1926 | 1927 - 1944 | 1945–1954 | 1955–1989 | | 1990 - | Now |
|---|---|---|---|---|---|---|---|
| Hikone (彦根) | Hikone | February 11, 1937; Hikone City | Hikone | Hikone | | Hikone | Hikone |
| Kita-aoyagi (北青柳) | Kita-aoyagi | February 11, 1937; Hikone City | Hikone | Hikone | | Hikone | Hikone |
| Kita-aoyagi (北青柳) | May 6, 1891 separation Matsubara (松原) | February 11, 1937; Hikone City | Hikone | Hikone | | Hikone | Hikone |
| Aonami (青波) | Aonami | February 11, 1937; Hikone City | Hikone | Hikone | | Hikone | Hikone |
| Fukumitsu (福満) | Fukumitsu | February 11, 1937; Hikone City | Hikone | Hikone | | Hikone | Hikone |
| Chimoto (千本) | Chimoto | February 11, 1937; Hikone City | Hikone | Hikone | | Hikone | Hikone |
| Isoda (磯田) | Isoda | June 10, 1942 incorporation into Hikone | Hikone | Hikone | | Hikone | Hikone |
| Minami-aoyagi (南青柳) | Minami-aoyagi | June 10, 1942 incorporation into Hikone | Hikone | Hikone | | Hikone | Hikone |
| Hinatsu (日夏) | Hinatsu | Hinatsu | April 1, 1950 incorporation into Hikone | Hikone | | Hikone | Hikone |
| Kawase (川瀬) | August 16, 1890 rename Kawase (河瀬) | Kawase | Kawase | September 30, 1956 incorporation into Hikone | | Hikone | Hikone |
| Yasumizu (安水) | June 25, 1892 rename Kameyama (亀山) | Kameyama | Kameyama | September 30, 1956 incorporation into Hikone | | Hikone | Hikone |
| Takamiya (高宮) | September 10, 1912; Takamiya | Takamiya | Takamiya | April 3, 1957 incorporation into Hikone | | Hikone | Hikone |
| Taga (多賀) | Taga | November 3, 1941; Taga | Taga | April 1, 1955; Taga | | Taga | Taga |
| Kyūtoku (久徳) | Kyūtoku | November 3, 1941; Taga | Taga | April 1, 1955; Taga | | Taga | Taga |
| Seritani (芹谷) | Seritani | November 3, 1941; Taga | Taga | April 1, 1955; Taga | | Taga | Taga |
| Ōtaki (大滝) | Ōtaki | Ōtaki | Ōtaki | April 1, 1955; Taga | | Taga | Taga |
| Wakigahata (脇ヶ畑) | Wakigahata | Wakigahata | Wakigahata | April 1, 1955; Taga | | Taga | Taga |
| Higashi-kōra (東甲良) | Higashi-kōra | Higashi-kōra | Higashi-kōra | April 1, 1955; Kōra (甲良) | | Kōra | Kōra |
| Nishi-kōra (西甲良) | Nishi-kōra | Nishi-kōra | Nishi-kōra | April 1, 1955; Kōra (甲良) | | Kōra | Kōra |
| Toyosato (豊郷) | Toyosato | Toyosato | Toyosato | September 30, 1956; Toyosato | February 11, 1971; Toyosato | Toyosato | Toyosato |
| Echi D Hie (日枝) Village | Echi D, Hie | Echi D, Hie | Echi D, Hie V | September 30, 1956; Toyosato | February 11, 1971; Toyosato | Toyosato | Toyosato |
