= Taga Taisha-mae Station =

Railway station in Taga, Shiga Prefecture, Japan

Taga Taisha-mae Station 多賀大社前駅
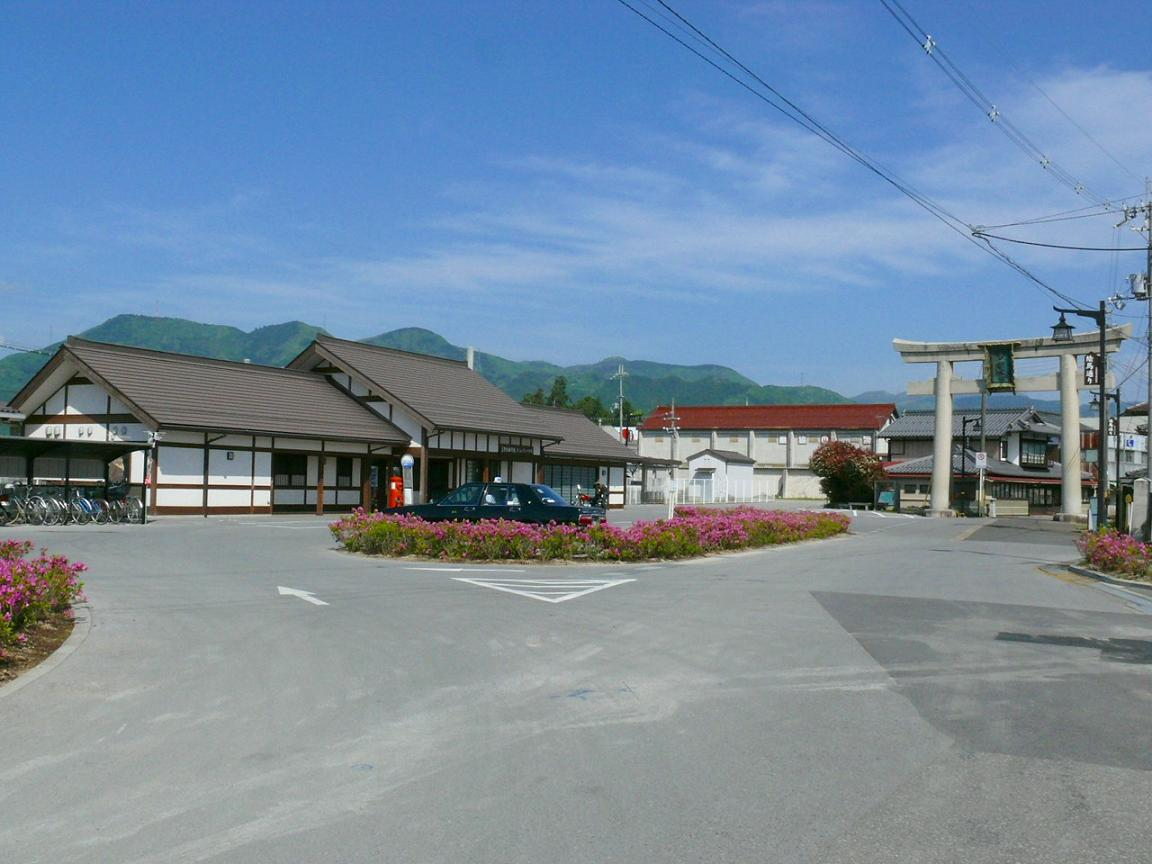
- Taga Taisha-mae Station, May 2007

General information
- Location: 1322 Taga, Taga-cho, Inukami-gun, Shiga-ken 522-0341; Japan
- Coordinates: 35.226440°N 136.284073°E
- Operator: Ohmi Railway
- Line: ■ Ohmi Railway Taga Line
- Distance: 2.5 km from Takamiya
- Platforms: 2 bay platforms

Other information
- Station code: OR09
- Website: Official website

History
- Opened: March 8, 1914
- Former names: Taga (to 1998)

Passengers
- FY2015: 226 daily
Location
- Location within Shiga Prefecture Location within Japan

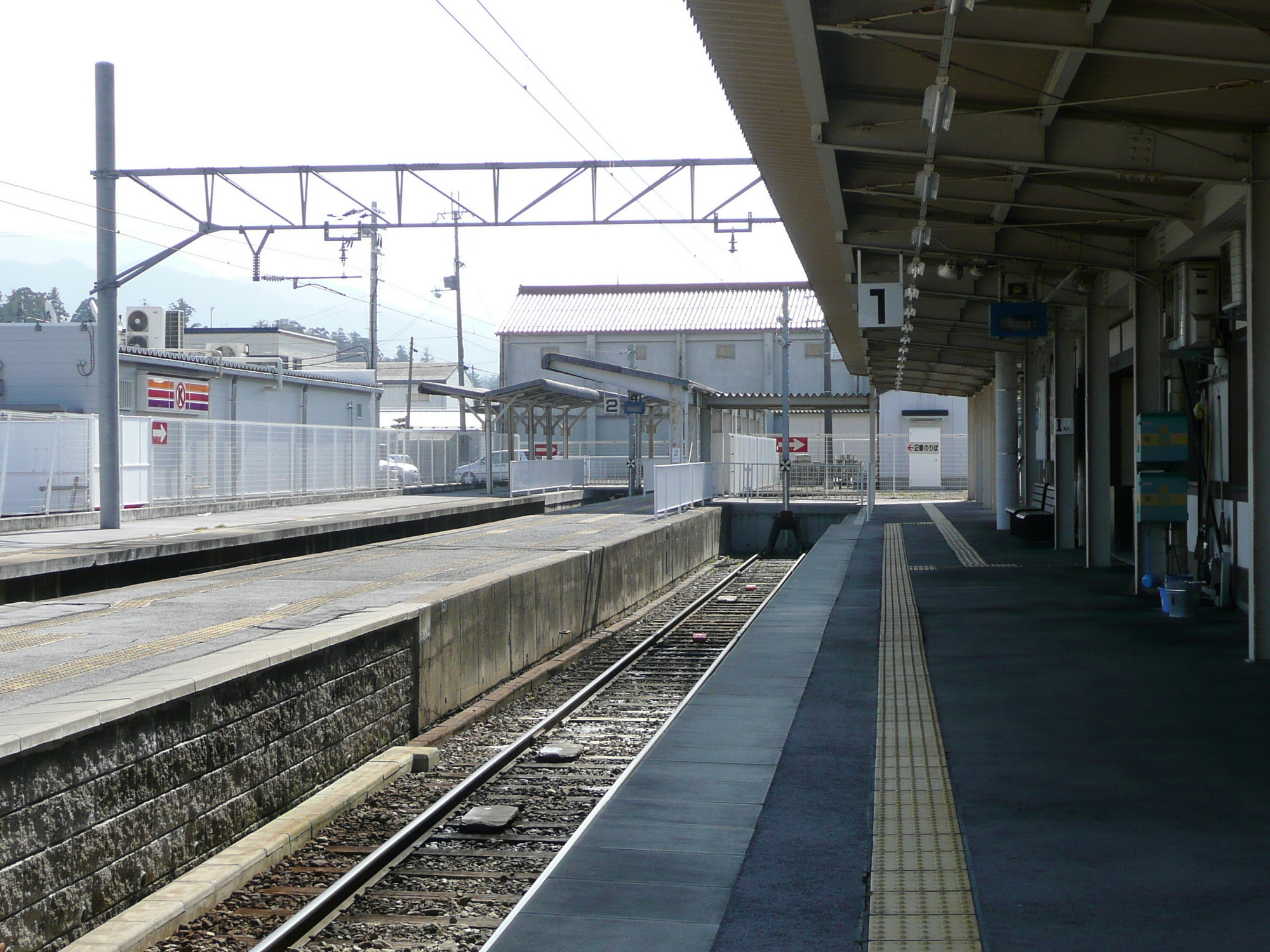
Taga Taisha-mae Station platforms

Taga Taisha-mae Station (多賀大社前駅, Taga Taisha-mae-eki) is a passenger railway station in located in the town of Taga, Shiga Prefecture, Japan, operated by the private railway operator Ohmi Railway.

== Lines ==
Taga Taisha-mae Station is the terminus of the Ohmi Railway Taga Line, and is located 2.5 rail kilometers from the opposing terminus of the line at Takamiya Station.

== Station layout ==
The station consists of two bay platforms. The station is unattended.

== Adjacent stations ==
«	Service	»
Ohmi Railway Taga Line
Screen	Local	Terminus

== History ==
Taga Taisha-mae Station was opened on March 8, 1914 as Taga Station (多賀駅, Taga eki). It was renamed to its present name on April 1, 1998.

== Surroundings ==
- Taga Taisha
- Taga Town Office
- Taga Municipal Taga Elementary School

== See also ==
- List of railway stations in Japan
