= Taga, Shiga =

Taga 多賀町
- Town
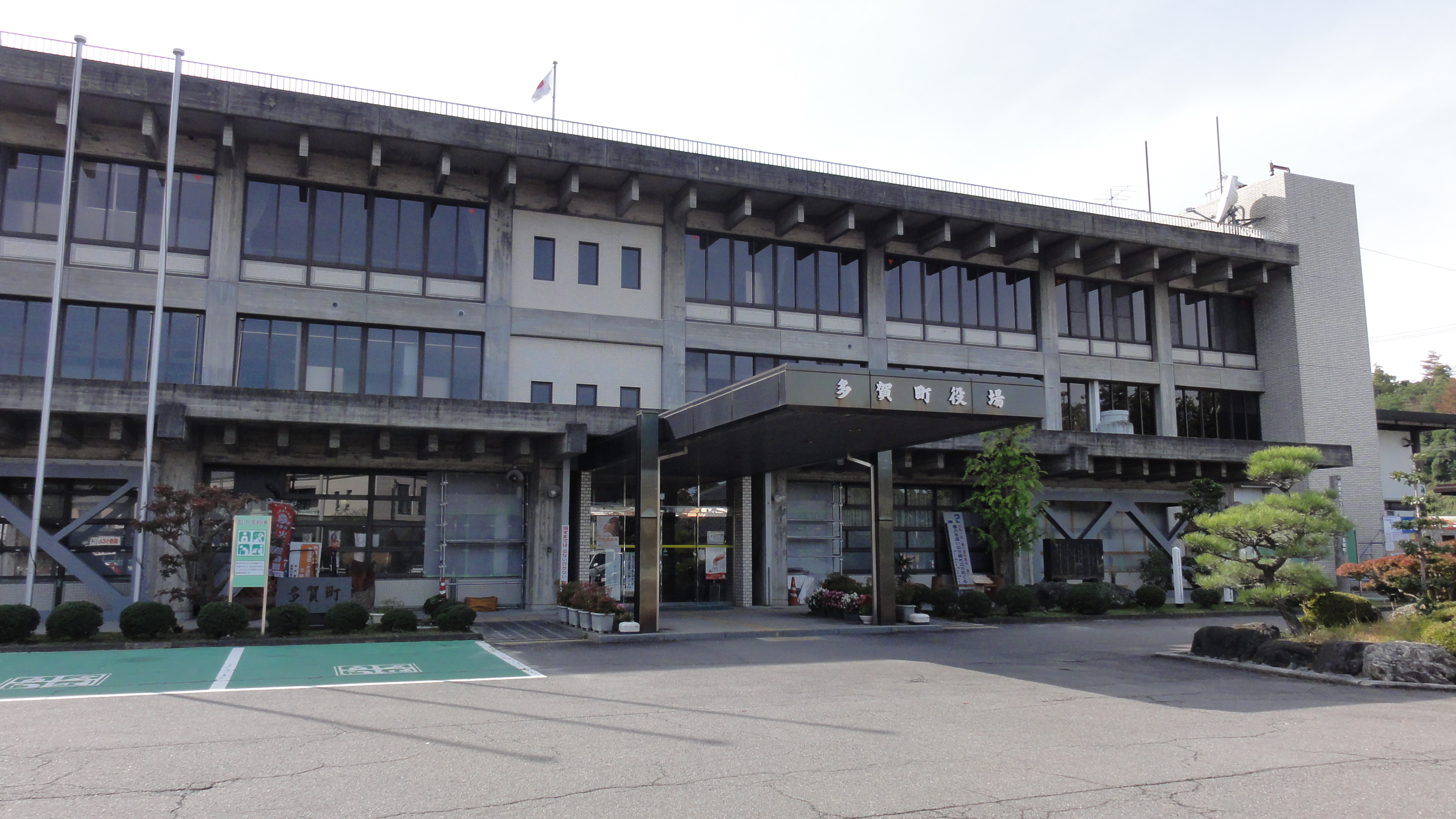
- Taga town hall

- Flag Seal

- Location of Taga in Shiga Prefecture

- Location in Japan
- Coordinates: 35°13′N 136°18′E
- Country: Japan
- Region: Kansai
- Prefecture: Shiga Prefecture
- District: Inukami

Area
  - Total: 135.77 km^{2} (52.42 sq mi)

Population (July 31, 2021)
  - Total: 7,525
  - Density: 55.42/km^{2} (143.5/sq mi)
- Time zone: UTC+09:00 (JST)
- City hall address: 342, Taga, Taga-chō, Inukami-gun, Shiga-ken 522-0341
- Website: Official website
- Symbols
- Bird: Japanese bush-warbler
- Flower: Lilium japonicum
- Tree: Cryptomeria

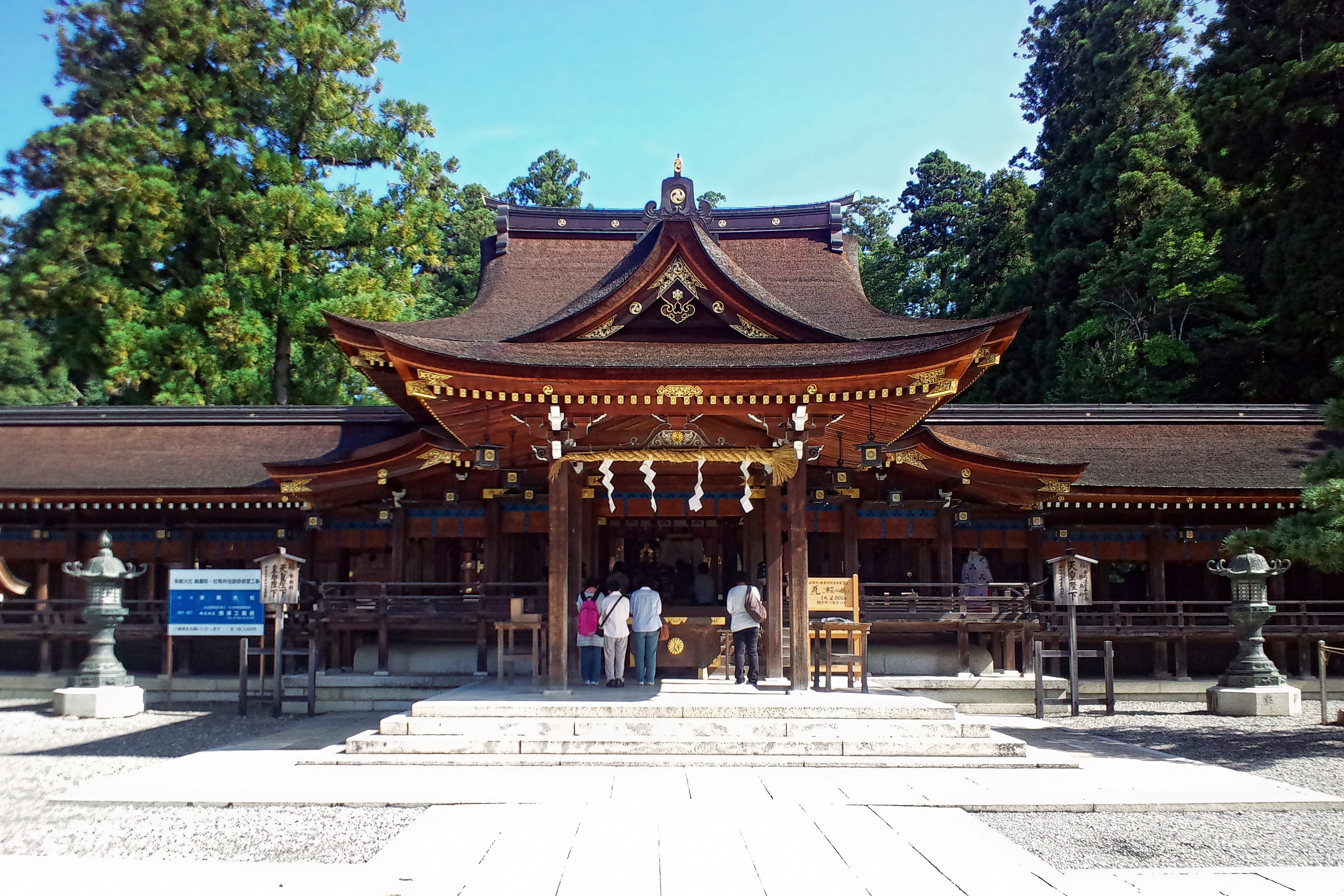
Taga Taisha Haiden

Taga (多賀町, Taga-chō) is a town located in Inukami District, Shiga Prefecture, Japan. As of 31 July 2021, the town had an estimated population of 7,525 in 2900 households and a population density of 940 persons per km^{2}. The total area of the town is 135.77 square kilometres (52.42 sq mi). Taga developed as a shrine town of Taga Taisha, a major Shinto shrine.

== Geography ==
Taga is located in eastern Shiga Prefecture, with the eastern part of the town is in the Suzuka Mountains bordering Inabe in Mie Prefecture and Ogaki in Gifu Prefecture. The western part of the town is in the flatlands of the Koto Plains, which extend towards Lake Biwa. The administrative and industrial center of the town is in the west, with the mountainous areas suffering from rural depopulation.The Inukami River flows through the south of the town.

=== Neighbouring municipalities ===
Gifu Prefecture

- Ōgaki

Mie Prefecture

- Inabe

Shiga Prefecture

- Aishō
- Higashiōmi
- Hikone
- Kōra
- Maibara

=== Climate ===
Taga has a humid subtropical climate (Köppen Cfa) characterized by warm summers and cool winters with light to no snowfall.

== Demographics ==
Per Japanese census data, the population of Taga has declined over the past 70 years.

Historical population
Year	Pop.	±%
1920	9,623	—
1930	9,340	−2.9%
1940	8,979	−3.9%
1950	11,002	+22.5%
1960	10,547	−4.1%
1970	9,279	−12.0%
1980	9,284	+0.1%
1990	9,136	−1.6%
2000	8,462	−7.4%
2010	7,764	−8.2%
2020	7,274	−6.3%

== History ==
The area of Taga was part of ancient Ōmi Province, and the name is listed in the ancient Kojiki chronicle. The area was dominated by the local Taga clan from ancient times into the Sengoku period, and the town itself developed as market town in front of the gates of Taga Taisha, a noted Shinto shrine that was favored by Toyotomi Hideyoshi. The Taga clan were dispossessed after the Battle of Sekigahara and the region came under the control of Hikone Domain under the Edo period Tokugawa shogunate. The village of Taga was established on April 1, 1889, with the creation of the modern municipalities system.Taga merged with the neighboring villages of Seritani and Kyutoku to form the town on Taga on November 3, 1941. The town expanded in 1955 by annexing the villages of Ōtaki and Wakigahata.

== Government ==
Taga has a mayor-council form of government with a directly elected mayor and a unicameral city council of 12 members. Taga, collectively with the other municipalities of Inukami District, contributes one member to the Shiga Prefectural Assembly. In terms of national politics, the city is part of Shiga 2nd district of the lower house of the Diet of Japan.

== Economy ==
Agriculture and forestry has dominated the local economy since ancient times. Manufacturing includes a number of small to medium-sized factories, the largest of which is a bottling plant owned by Kirin Beer and a bakery owned by Fuji Baking Group.

== Education ==
Taga has two public elementary schools and one public middle school operated by the town government. The town does not have a high school.

== Transportation ==
=== Railway ===
Ohmi Railway – Taga Line

- Taga Taisha-mae

=== Highways ===
- Meishin Expressway
- National Route 306
- National Route 307

== Local attractions ==
- Binmanji Ishibotokedani Necropolis, a National Historic Site
- Mount Oike, highest peak in the Suzuka Mountains at 1241 meters
- Taga Taisha, a major Shinto shrine
