= List of cities in Shiga Prefecture by population =

The following list sorts all cities (including towns) in the Japanese prefecture of Shiga with a population of more than 5,000 according to the 2020 Census. As of October 1, 2020, 19 places fulfill this criterion and are listed here. This list refers only to the population of individual cities, towns and villages within their defined limits, which does not include other municipalities or suburban areas within urban agglomerations.

== List ==
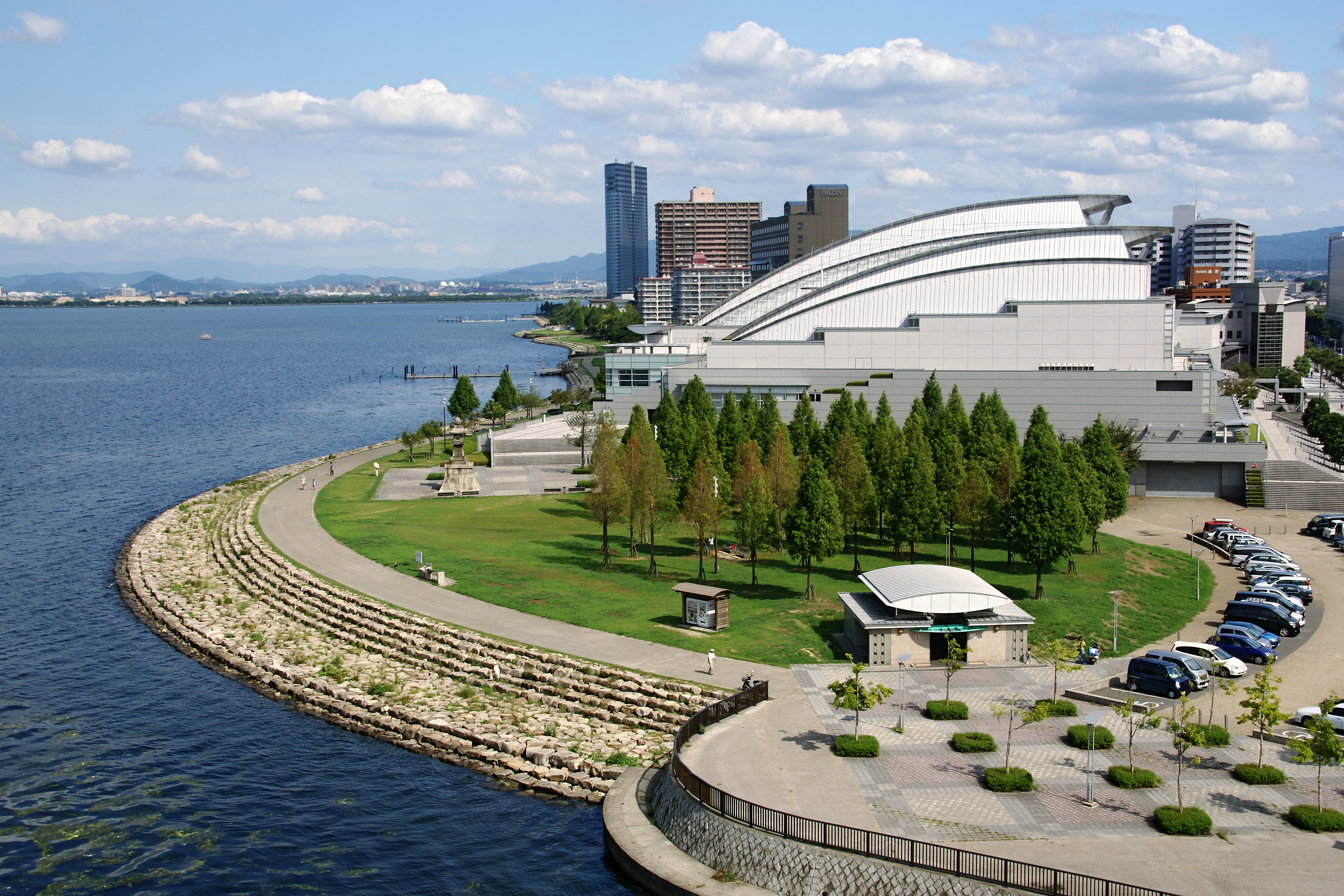
Ōtsu

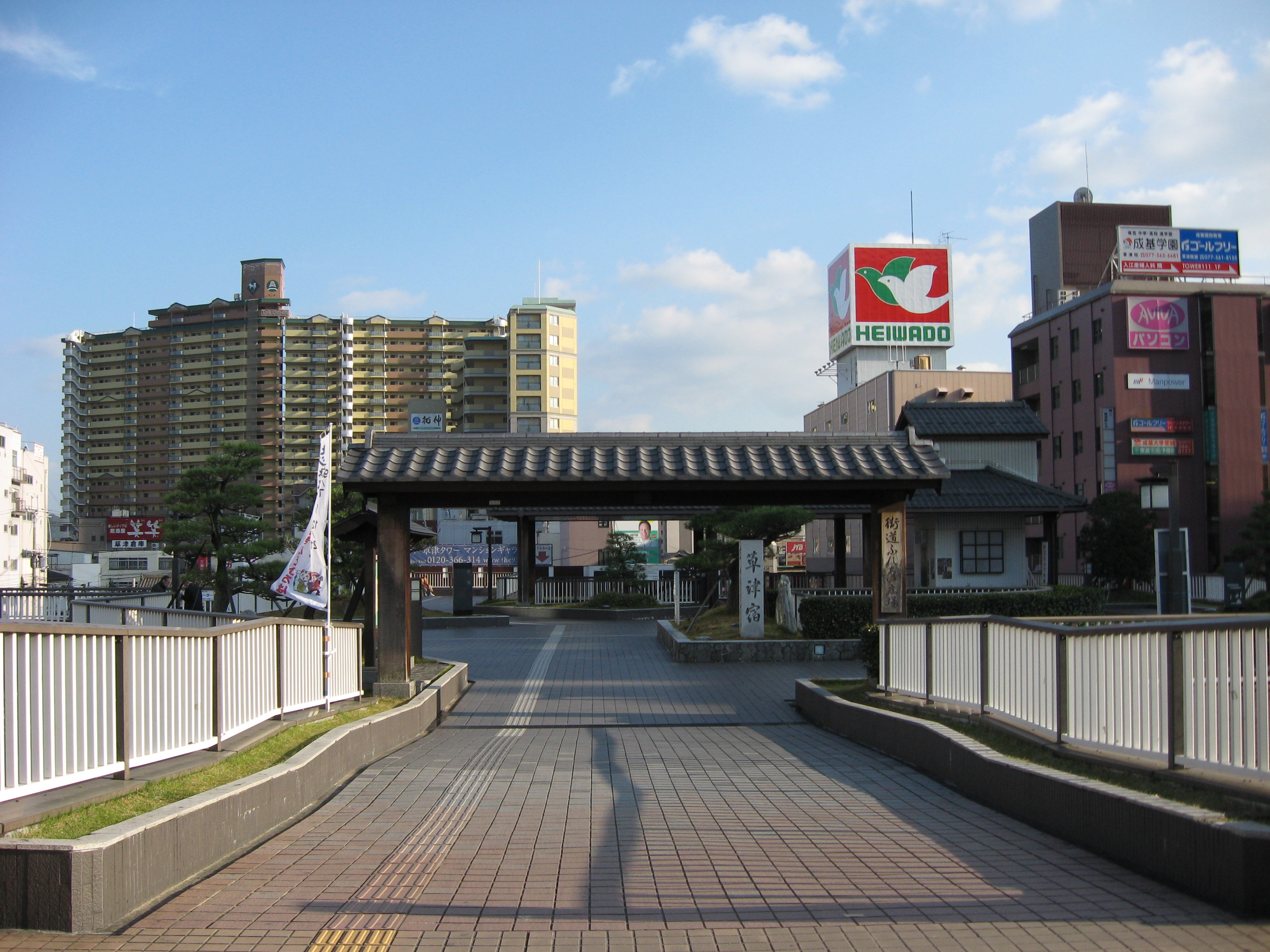
Kusatsu

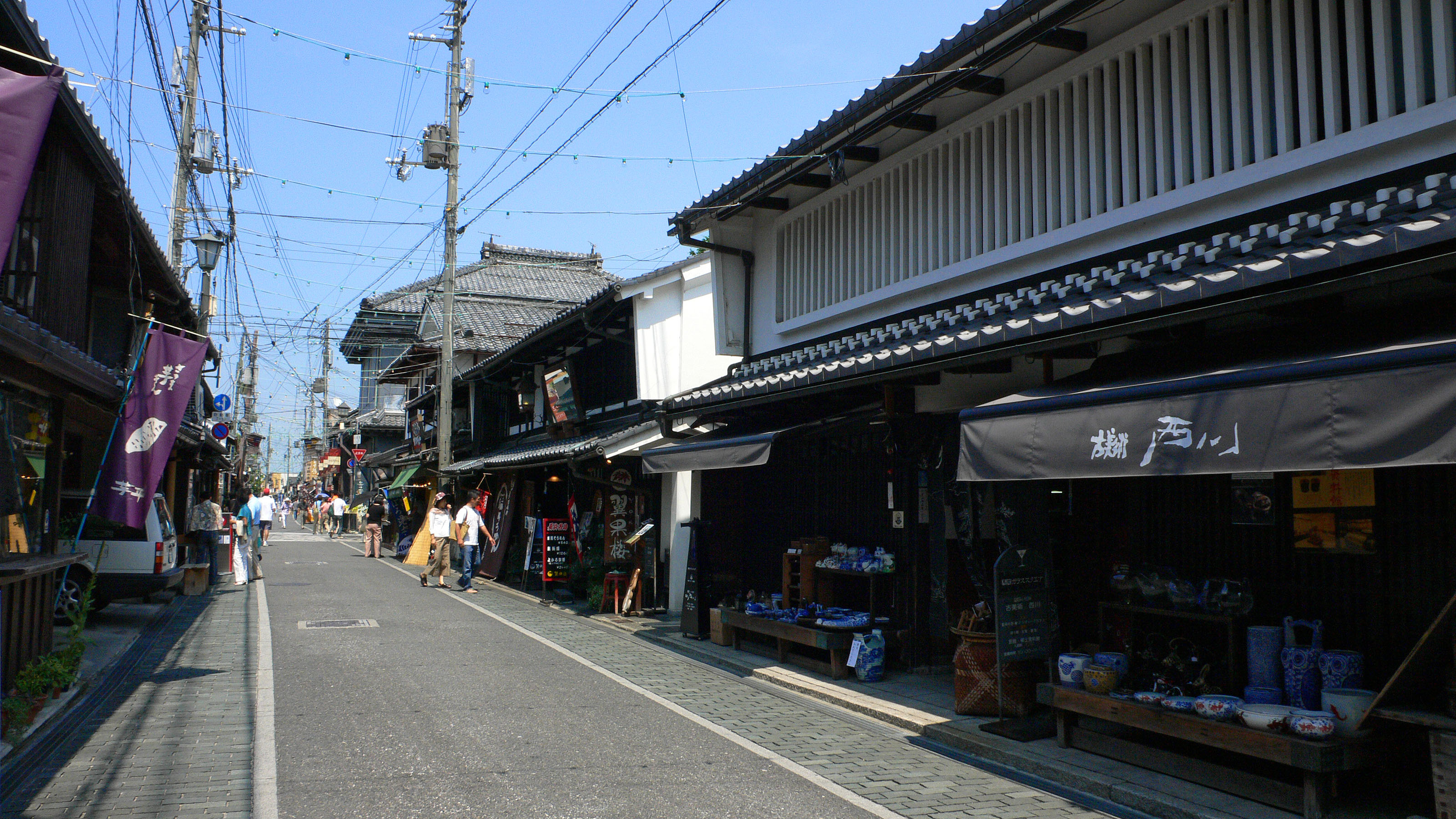
Nagahama

The following table lists the 19 cities and towns in Shiga with a population of at least 5,000 on October 1, 2020, according to the 2020 Census. The table also gives an overview of the evolution of the population since the 1995 census.

Rank (2020)	Name	Status	2020	2015	2010	2005	2000	1995
1	Ōtsu	City	345,202	340,973	337,634	323,719	309,793	295,574
2	Kusatsu	City	143,958	137,247	130,874	121,159	115,455	101,828
3	Nagahama	City	113,719	118,193	124,131	124,498	123,862	122,415
4	Hikone	City	113,693	112,156	112,156	109,779	107,860	103,508
5	Higashiōmi	City	112,872	114,180	115,479	116,797	114,395	111,322
6	Kōka	City	88,417	90,901	92,704	93,853	92,484	90,744
7	Moriyama	City	83,271	79,859	76,560	70,823	65,542	61,859
8	Ōmihachiman	City	81,170	81,312	81,738	80,610	80,669	79,488
9	Rittō	City	68,879	66,749	63,655	59,869	54,856	48,759
10	Konan	City	54,492	54,289	54,614	55,325	53,740	51,372
11	Yasu	City	50,541	49,889	49,955	49,486	48,326	45,865
12	Takashima	City	46,379	50,025	52,486	53,950	55,451	54,369
13	Maibara	City	37,201	38,719	40,060	41,009	41,251	40,557
14	Hino	Town	20,975	21,873	22,870	22,809	23,022	23,132
15	Aishō	Town	20,895	20,778	20,118	19,729	18,992	17,856
16	Ryūō	Town	11,797	12,434	12,916	13,280	13,370	13,650
17	Taga	Town	7,283	7,355	7,761	8,145	8,463	8,916
18	Toyosato	Town	7,139	7,442	7,566	7,418	7,132	7,222
19	Kōra	Town	6,365	7,039	7,500	8,103	8,169	8,569
