= Administrative divisions of Shiga Prefecture =

- Category: Municipality
- Location: Shiga Prefecture
- Number: 19 (13 cities, 6 towns)
- Populations: 6,362 (Kōra) – 345,070 (Ōtsu)
- Areas: 7.80 km² (Toyosato) – 693.05 km² (Takashima)
- Government: City Hall, Town Hall

Shiga Prefecture is a prefecture located in the Kansai region of Japan. It was established from Otsu Prefecture in January 1872 (the 5th year of Meiji), merged with Inukami Prefecture in September of the same year, integrated into Fukui Prefecture in 1876, and separated from Fukui Prefecture in 1881 to become the current Shiga Prefecture. In 2020 (the 2nd year of Reiwa), Shiga Prefecture had a population of 1,413,610, ranking 26th among all prefectures; an area of 4,017.38 km^{2} (1,551.12 sq mi), ranking 38th among all prefectures; and a population density of 351.9/km^{2} (911/sq mi), ranking 15th among all prefectures.

Shiga Prefecture currently consists of 13 cities and 6 towns, totaling 19 municipalities. Otsu is the capital of Shiga Prefecture and the prefecture's only core city; it is also the most populous municipality with 345,070 inhabitants. The least populous municipality is Kōra, with 6,362 people. The largest municipality by area is Takashima, covering 693.05 km^{2} (267.59 sq mi), while the smallest is Toyosato at 7.80 km^{2} (3.01 sq mi). Kusatsu has the highest population density at 2,122.0/km^{2} (5,496/sq mi), whereas Higashiōmi has the lowest at 46.3/km^{2} (120/sq mi). In addition, Shiga Prefecture has 3 districts, which lie above the 6 towns but possess no administrative power and are not considered standard administrative divisions. According to traditional regional classifications, the municipalities of Shiga Prefecture can be divided into Konan (south), Koto (east), Kosei (west), and Kohoku (north) regions based on their relative positions to Lake Biwa at the center of the prefecture. They can be further subdivided into subregions including Otsu, Southern, Koka, Higashiomi, Koto, Kohoku, and Takashima.

== Relationship between regions, subregions, and municipalities ==
The table below lists the correspondence between the regions, subregions, and municipalities of Shiga Prefecture. The relevant data is sourced from the official website of the Shiga Prefectural Government and the Kadokawa Nihon Chimei Daijiten (角川日本地名大辞典).

Regions, subregions, and municipalities of Shiga Prefecture
Region	Subregion	Municipality
Konan (south)	Otsu	Otsu
Konan (south)	Southern	Kusatsu, Moriyama, Rittō, Yasu
Konan (south)	Koka	Kōka, Konan
Koto (east, broad)	Koto (east, narrow)	Hikone, Aishō, Kōra, Taga, Toyosato
Koto (east, broad)	Higashiomi	Higashiōmi, Ōmihachiman, Hino, Ryūō
Kohoku (north)		Nagahama, Maibara
Kosei (west)	Takashima	Takashima

== List of municipalities ==
The table below lists the municipalities of Shiga Prefecture, including their English and Japanese names, date and method of establishment, area, population, population density, flags, emblems, and maps, sorted by their Local Authority Code (JIS code). The Japanese names are provided with furigana to indicate their pronunciation. Data such as JIS codes, area, population, and population density are sourced from the 2020 Census of Japan|National Census and the Statistical Reports on the Land Area by Prefectures, Subprefectures, and Municipalities in Japan published by the Geospatial Information Authority of Japan (GSI) of the Ministry of Land, Infrastructure, Transport and Tourism. The unit for area is square kilometers (km²), population is measured in number of people, and population density is expressed in people per square kilometer (people/km²).

Legend
* : Prefectural capital and core city
† : Maximum value among municipalities
‡ : Minimum value among municipalities

List of municipalities in Shiga Prefecture
Name		Code	Establishment		Population (2020)	Area (km²)	Population density (/km²)	Flag	Emblem	Map
English	Japanese	Code	Date	Method	Population (2020)	Area (km²)	Population density (/km²)	Flag	Emblem	Map
Shiga Prefecture
Shiga Prefecture	滋賀県 (Shiga-ken)	25000	1872 (Meiji 5)	Reorganized from Otsu Prefecture	1,413,610	4,017.38	351.9	Flag of Shiga Prefecture	Emblem of Shiga Prefecture	Map of Shiga Prefecture
Cities (Shi)
Otsu*	大津市 (Ōtsu-shi)	25201	1898 (Meiji 31)	Reorganized from Ōtsu Town (Ōtsu-chō)	345,070 †	464.51	742.9	Flag of Otsu	Emblem of Otsu	Location of Otsu in Shiga Prefecture
Hikone	彦根市 (Hikone-shi)	25202	1937 (Shōwa 12)	Merged from Hikone Town, Kita-Aoyagi Village, Matsubara Village, Aonami Village, Fukumitsu Village, and Chimoto Village	113,647	196.87	577.3	Flag of Hikone	Emblem of Hikone	Location of Hikone in Shiga Prefecture
Nagahama	長浜市 (Nagahama-shi)	25203	1943 (Shōwa 18)	Merged from Nagahama Town,Kamiteru Village, Rokusō Village, Minamigōri Village, Kitagōri Village, |Nishikuroda Village, and Kanda Village	113,636	681.02	166.9	Flag of Nagahama	Emblem of Nagahama	Location of Nagahama in Shiga Prefecture
Ōmihachiman	近江八幡市 (Ōmihachiman-shi)	25204	1954 (Shōwa 29)	Merged from Hachiman Town, Okayama Village, Kaneda Village, Kirihara Village, and Mabuchi Village	81,122	177.45	457.2	Flag of Ōmihachiman	Emblem of Ōmihachiman	Location of Ōmihachiman in Shiga Prefecture
Kusatsu	草津市 (Kusatsu-shi)	25206	1954 (Shōwa 29)	Merged from Kusatsu Town, Shizu Village, Oigami Village, Yamada Village, Kasanui Village, and Tokiwa Village	143,913	67.82	2,122.0 †	Flag of Kusatsu	Emblem of Kusatsu	Location of Kusatsu in Shiga Prefecture
Moriyama	守山市 (Moriyama-shi)	25207	1970 (Shōwa 45)	Reorganized from Moriyama Town (Moriyama-chō)	83,236	55.74	1,493.3	Flag of Moriyama	Emblem of Moriyama	Location of Moriyama in Shiga Prefecture
Rittō	栗東市 (Rittō-shi)	25208	2001 (Heisei 13)	Reorganized from Rittō Town (Rittō-chō)	68,820	52.69	1,306.1	Flag of Rittō	Emblem of Rittō	Location of Rittō in Shiga Prefecture
Kōka	甲賀市 (Kōka-shi)	25209	2004 (Heisei 16)	Merged from Minakuchi Town, Tsuchiyama Town, Kōka Town, Kōnan Town, and Shigaraki Town	88,358	481.62	183.5	Flag of Kōka	Emblem of Kōka	Location of Kōka in Shiga Prefecture
Yasu	野洲市 (Yasu-shi)	25210	2004 (Heisei 16)	Merged from Chūzu Town and Yasu Town						
Konan	湖南市 (Konan-shi)	25211	2004 (Heisei 16)	Merged from Ishibe Town and Kōsei Town	54,460	70.40	773.6	Flag of Konan	Emblem of Konan	Location of Konan in Shiga Prefecture
Takashima	高島市 (Takashima-shi)	25212	2005 (Heisei 17)	Merged from Makino Town, Imazu Town, Shinasahi Town, Adogawa Town, and Takashima Town	46,377	693.05 †	66.9	Flag of Takashima	Emblem of Takashima	Location of Takashima in Shiga Prefecture
Higashiōmi	東近江市 (Higashiōmi-shi)	25213	2005 (Heisei 17)	Merged from Yōkaichi, Eigenji Town, Gokashō Town, Aitō Town, and Kotō Town	112,819	388.37	46.3 ‡	Flag of Higashiōmi	Emblem of Higashiōmi	Location of Higashiōmi in Shiga Prefecture
Maibara	米原市 (Maibara-shi)	25214	2005 (Heisei 17)	Merged from Maibara Town, Ibuki Town, and Santō Town	37,225	250.39	148.7	Flag of Maibara	Emblem of Maibara	Location of Maibara in Shiga Prefecture
Gamō District (Gamō-gun)
Hino	日野町 (Hino-chō)	25383	1889 (Meiji 22)	Established directly with the municipal system implementation	20,964	117.60	178.3	Flag of Hino	Emblem of Hino	Location of Hino in Shiga Prefecture
Ryūō	竜王町 (Ryūō-chō)	25384	1955 (Shōwa 30)	Merged from Naemura Village and Kagamiyama Village	11,789	44.55	264.6	Flag of Ryūō	Emblem of Ryūō	Location of Ryūō in Shiga Prefecture
Echi District (Echi-gun)
Aishō	愛荘町 (Aishō-chō)	25425	2006 (Heisei 18)	Merged from Hatashō Town and Echigawa Town	20,893	37.97	550.3	Flag of Aishō	Emblem of Aishō	Location of Aishō in Shiga Prefecture
Inukami District (Inukami-gun)
Toyosato	豊郷町 (Toyosato-chō)	25441	1971 (Shōwa 46)	Reclassified from Toyosato Village	7,132	7.80 ‡	914.4	Flag of Toyosato	Emblem of Toyosato	Location of Toyosato in Shiga Prefecture
Kōra	甲良町 (Kōra-chō)	25442	1955 (Shōwa 30)	Merged from Higashikōra Village and Nishikōra Village	6,362 ‡	13.63	466.8	Flag of Kōra	Emblem of Kōra	Location of Kōra in Shiga Prefecture
Taga	多賀町 (Taga-chō)	25443	1941 (Shōwa 16)	Merged from Taga Village, Seritani Village, and Kyūtoku Village	7,274	135.77	53.6	Flag of Taga	Emblem of Taga	Location of Taga in Shiga Prefecture

== See also ==
- Administrative divisions of Japan
- Prefectures of Japan
- Municipalities of Japan
