= K-On! =

Manga series by Kakifly

- First tankōbon volume cover, featuring Yui Hirasawa

けいおん! (Keion!)
- Genre: Comedy; Music; Slice of life
- Manga
- Written by: Kakifly
- Published by: Houbunsha
- English publisher: NA: Yen Press
- Magazine: Manga Time Kirara; Manga Time Kirara Carat
- English magazine: US: Yen Plus
- Original run: April 9, 2007 – June 28, 2012
- Volumes: 6
- Manga

K-On! Shuffle
- Written by: Kakifly
- Published by: Houbunsha
- English publisher: NA: Yen Press
- Magazine: Manga Time Kirara
- Original run: July 9, 2018 – present
- Volumes: 3
- Video game

K-On! Hōkago Live!!
- Developer: Sega
- Publisher: Sega
- Genre: Rhythm
- Platform: PlayStation Portable, PlayStation 3
- Released: September 30, 2010 (PSP); June 21, 2012 (PS3)
- Video game

K-On! Hōkago Rhythm Time
- Developer: Atlus
- Publisher: Index; Sega
- Genre: Rhythm, trading card game
- Platform: Arcade
- Released: April 26, 2013
- Video game

K-On! Hōkago Rhythm Selection
- Developer: Sega
- Publisher: Sega Interactive
- Genre: Rhythm, trading card game
- Platform: Arcade
- Released: November 13, 2014
- Anime
- K-On! (2009–2010); K-On!: The Movie (2011)
- icon

K-On! (Japanese: けいおん!, Hepburn: Keion!) (Note: The Japanese title is short for "light music" (軽音楽, Keiongaku); that is, more casual music (e.g. jazz or popular) in contrast to classical.) is a Japanese four-panel manga series written and illustrated by Kakifly. It was serialized in Houbunsha's Manga Time Kirara magazine between the May 2007 and October 2010 issues, and also serialized in Houbunsha's Manga Time Kirara Carat magazine. The manga relaunched from April 2011 to June 2012 with two separate storylines published in Manga Time Kirara and Manga Time Kirara Carat. The manga is licensed in North America by Yen Press. A spin-off manga about a different band of high school girls, K-On! Shuffle, began serialization in July 2018. The main series focuses on four young Japanese high school girls who join their school's light music club to try to save it from being disbanded. However, they are the only four members of the club, one of which has little experience with guitar playing.

A 13-episode anime television series adaptation produced by Kyoto Animation aired in Japan between April and June 2009. An additional original video animation (OVA) episode was released in January 2010. A 26-episode second season, titled K-On!! (with two exclamation marks), aired in Japan between April and September 2010, with an OVA episode released in March 2011. An anime film adaptation was released in Japan in December 2011. Bandai Entertainment had licensed the first season until their closure in 2012. Sentai Filmworks has since re-licensed the first season, in addition to acquiring the rights to the second season and film. K-On! has achieved strong sales in Japan, and by 2011 gross revenues had reached over ¥15 billion ($192 million) in merchandise sales.

== Plot ==
In an unspecified part of Japan, four high school girls join the light music club of the all-girls private Sakuragaoka High School to try to save it from being disbanded. However, they are the only members of the club. At first, Yui Hirasawa has no experience playing musical instruments or reading sheet music, but she eventually becomes an excellent guitar player. From then on, Yui, along with bassist Mio Akiyama, drummer Ritsu Tainaka, and keyboardist Tsumugi Kotobuki spend their school days practicing, performing, and hanging out together. The club is overseen by music teacher Sawako Yamanaka who eventually becomes their homeroom teacher as well, during their final year of high school. In their second year, the club welcomes another guitarist, underclassman Azusa Nakano. After Azusa joins they gain more structure and begin to practice more.

After their third year, Yui, Mio, Ritsu and Tsumugi graduate and enroll into a university. There they join its light music club alongside three other students: Akira Wada, Ayame Yoshida, and Sachi Hayashi. Meanwhile, Azusa continues to run the high school light music club alongside Yui's sister Ui, their classmate Jun Suzuki, and new members Sumire Saitō and Nao Okuda.

The spin-off manga K-On! Shuffle focuses on a new set of characters at a different school. After being inspired by the Sakuragaoka High School light music club, Yukari Sakuma and friend Kaede Shimizu seek to form their own club. Along with classmate Maho Sawabe, they discover the Light Music Appreciation Society, a club run by Riko Satou.

== Characters ==
=== Main ===
Yui Hirasawa (平沢 唯, Hirasawa Yui)
Voiced by: Aki Toyosaki (Japanese); Stephanie Sheh (Bang Zoom!), Lili Troncale (Animax) (English)
Yui is the lead guitarist and split vocalist of the Light Music Club who plays a Heritage Cherry Sunburst Gibson Les Paul Standard electric guitar that she nicknames "Gīta" (ギー太). Before she learned how to play the electric guitar, the only instrument she knew how to play was the castanets. She does not get good grades in school (though when properly coached, she can achieve astounding results) and is easily distracted by trivialities (mainly those deemed cute and adorable). Yui is a kind and friendly girl, but also clumsy and easily spaces out most of the time; as a result, she can be forgetful and is sometimes oblivious to the situation around her. Yui has shoulder-length, brown hair (a little longer than Ritsu's) which she accessorizes with two yellow hair clips, and brown eyes. She takes a huge liking for any kind of food (though she never gains weight, which is greatly envied by Mugi, Mio, and Sawako). She has a younger sister named Ui, who is very mature and acts as the "older sister" of Yui, taking care of her while their parents are away on business trips. Yui works extremely hard to get better at playing guitar. During performances, Yui plays with amazing energy and joy which usually results in great response from the audience.
As a musician, Yui has absolute pitch—she can tune her guitar perfectly without a tuner, which greatly impresses Azusa, who has played the guitar much longer than Yui. She has a very easy-going nature, but has incredible focus and retention when she has a clear goal in sight; unfortunately, this is limited to only one subject at a time, and her other skills deteriorate quickly (for example, Yui is at one point pressed to make up failing test scores, and she quickly brings her math skills up to par at the expense of her guitar knowledge). Despite all of this, Yui is still devoted to her band and will always practice hard enough for the club. At school, she has become quite admired for her great voice. However, she is known to forget her lyrics mid-performance as well as overdoing things, making her unable to perform sometimes. Mio was the lead vocalist at first, since Yui could not play the guitar and sing at the same time. Yui is also known to write childish lyrics as Ui has assisted her in creating them.
Mio Akiyama (秋山 澪, Akiyama Mio)
Voiced by: Yōko Hikasa (Japanese); Cristina Vee (Bang Zoom!), Catherine Fu (Animax) (English)
Mio is the bassist, songwriter, and split vocalist for the light music club. She is a shy girl who is in the light music club. She plays a left-handed, 3-Color Sunburst Fender Jazz Bass with a tortoiseshell pickguard, though is shown playing a Fender Precision Bass in the first manga volume. She uses D'Addario EXL160M medium bass strings. Her bass is given the name Elizabeth (エリザベス, Erizabesu; or Elizabass) later in the anime. While she originally intended to join the literature club, she was forced into the light music club by her childhood friend and the club's president/drummer, Ritsu. She gets excellent grades in school, and while she's very kind and warm, she is also mature and can be strict, especially where Ritsu, who always teases her, is involved. Her weakness is the horrific; she is often incapacitated with fear when stories with disturbing topics come up. She also fears being in the spotlight, is easily embarrassed, and is often subject to teasing from Ritsu and Sawako, their club adviser and eventual third-year homeroom teacher. Mio has long, straight black hair and gray eyes (that are angled slightly more than the other characters). She cites that she chose bass since it is not the center of attention in the band, unlike the guitarist. Mio is more technical when it comes to music, and Yui often comes to her when she is in need of more guitar tutorials.
Mio is the split vocalist of the band, though given her dislike of being center stage, she tries to avoid taking the lead vocal if possible, generally singing if Yui is unable to. She writes most of the songs, although they usually have overly girlish lyrics like "Light and Fluffy Time". As she is left-handed, she becomes entranced whenever she sees left-handed instruments because of their rarity. After their first live performance, the attractive Mio gained a huge fan following (in no small part due to an unfortunate accident that occurred at the end of the show where she accidentally flashed her underwear, after tripping on her bass cable), led by an infatuated former student council president. Also resulting from her sudden popularity, most of her classmates voted that she portray Romeo in their class play. Mio comes to greatly enjoy her time at university as she encounters many new experiences. She is also able to overcome some of her shyness and make new friends such as Sachi and Ayame.
Ritsu Tainaka (田井中 律, Tainaka Ritsu)
Voiced by: Satomi Satō (Japanese); Cassandra Lee Morris (Bang Zoom!), Muriel Hoffman (Animax) (English)
Ritsu (or Ricchan (りっちゃん, Ritchan), as nicknamed by Yui) is the self-proclaimed president of the light music club and the leader of Hokago Tea Time who plays a yellow Rick Marotta Signature Yamaha Hipgig drum kit (with an add-on floor tom in the opening credits only) combined with a cymbal set from Avedis Zildjian, though is shown playing a white Yamaha Absolute Series drumkit in the anime's closing credits. She has an ambiguous yet upbeat personality, and is even more extroverted and hammy than Yui, but often has trouble remembering important club activities and announcements and gets constantly rebuked by Mio and Nodoka for forgetting to send in important forms concerning the club. Ritsu is cheerful, often likes making jokes and is sarcastic most of the time, but still shares the good heart of the other members. She is skilled at brainstorming ideas that earn money for the club. Ritsu has shoulder-length, brown hair, with her bangs pulled back with a yellow hairband, and gold-colored eyes. She wears her school jacket open. She says she chose to play the drums because they are "cool", but later admits that she has trouble playing instruments which involve intricate finger movements.
She is Mio's childhood friend and will often take the opportunity to tease her whenever Mio is cowering from something. She is also known to become easily jealous of Mio's other high school friends, even going as far as spying on Mio when on outings with them. Ritsu is always on the go and will stop at nothing for the success of the light music club. Despite her rough mannerisms and speech, she gets cast as Juliet by the majority of her classmates in their class play rendition of Romeo and Juliet and, in the end, manages to act like a proper girl. In the anime, she states her favorite drummer is Keith Moon of The Who. She is skilled at cooking.
Tsumugi Kotobuki (琴吹 紬, Kotobuki Tsumugi)
Voiced by: Minako Kotobuki (Japanese); Shelby Lindley (Bang Zoom!), Patricia Chiu (Animax) (English)
Tsumugi, often referred to as Mugi (ムギ) by her friends, is a wealthy Kansai girl with a gentle and sweet personality who plays a Korg Triton Extreme 76-key keyboard, though she is also seen playing a Korg RK-100 keytar in the closing credits of the first season, and a Hammond organ in the closing credits of the second season. She originally intended to join the choir club, but joins the light music club instead after receiving an invitation and encouragement from both Mio and Ritsu. Tsumugi is considered a piano prodigy since she has been playing the piano since she was four and has experience in winning various piano contests. Tsumugi has written several songs for the light music club, as well as singing the back vocals in several other songs. She is a good student and has long, pale blonde hair, blue eyes, unusually large eyebrows that apparently run in her family, and a fair complexion that the other characters do not have, but she does not get sunburned. She, however, has great difficulty playing electric guitar.
She is the daughter of a company president, and her family has several villas in various places around Japan (and even one in Finland). Since her father also owns a maid café, she often brings confectionery and an assortment of sweets and pastries to the club room, and she diligently makes tea with a tea set which is kept in their club room. Despite her wealth, she is fascinated by and finds joy in "normal" activities, such as ordering fast food, sharing french fries with her club mates, holding down part-time jobs and haggling over prices. Tsumugi displays a rebellious streak occasionally, diverting from her normally well-behaved and mature demeanor to the surprise of the others. She also displays a childlike eagerness from time to time, and possesses unusually high strength, being able to effortlessly carry around her own keyboard, Ritsu's drums, amplifiers, and at one point beating an arm-wrestling game in an arcade.
Tsumugi is often entranced by the sight of two girls interacting closely together, sometimes imagining something more risqué in her head. While a lot of things do not bother her, she is fairly conscious about her weight (just like Mio), and she gets a bit anxious when her family's staff start spoiling her friends during villa visits. She later begins learning how to play the guitar from Azusa. Tsumugi has a childhood friend several years younger than her named Sumire Saitō, who is a daughter of the family that serves the Kotobuki household. Tsumugi grew up home schooled, and therefore spent very little time in the outside world. Because of their close friendship, Sumire would purchase everyday items for Tsumugi, like manga that she was not normally allowed to see. Tsumugi was rather taken by some of the yuri manga she received, which may have influenced her later perceptions about relationships. When Sumire started high school, Tsumugi wanted her to experience the light music club on her own, but due to Sumire's shyness Tsumugi came up with the excuse of sending her to the club room to pick up the tea sets that had been left there and told Sawako when Sumire did join that it was okay to leave the tea sets there.
Azusa Nakano (中野 梓, Nakano Azusa)
Voiced by: Ayana Taketatsu (Japanese); Christine Marie Cabanos (Bang Zoom!), Catherine Fu (Animax) (English)
Azusa is a student in the same year and class as Yui's sister Ui, who joins the light music club and becomes the rhythm guitarist, playing a Fender Mustang electric guitar. She eventually names her guitar Muttan, as it is a Mustang. She is a self-proclaimed "novice" guitarist who has been playing the guitar since she was in the fourth grade, and her parents are working in a jazz band. She is more serious than the other girls, and is kind of a tsundere as she often does not like to admit her true feelings. She often finds herself bewildered by the tea parties and cosplaying aspects of the club, when she would rather just practice, and is curious about how the club is able to play so well despite their problems and lack of practice; still, she's ultimately as kind as the other girls. However, she has a certain weakness for cakes and can be calmed down rather easily, sometimes by just being petted. She is constantly a victim of Yui's physical affection and is nicknamed Azu-nyan (あずにゃん) after trying on a pair of cat ears and meowing ("nyan" being the equivalent of "meow" in the Japanese vocabulary). Despite this, Azusa is ironically not too good with caring for cats. Azusa has long black hair, which she wears in pigtails, and brown eyes. While Azusa is talented at the guitar, she has trouble singing while playing unlike Yui and Mio.
In the band, she looks up to Mio the most due to her maturity and the fact that she is an experienced bassist, even trying to give Mio chocolate on Valentine's Day. However, she sometimes unintentionally makes remarks concerning Mio's weaknesses, such as her weight. She also finds Mugi very beautiful, and envies her hair and large eyes, and later starts teaching her how to play guitar when the two are alone in the club room. Since joining, Yui comes to her for advice on playing guitar, as well as maintenance. She gets a tan extremely easily, once during their time at the beach and another during a music festival (even after applying sunscreen). As a result, she frequently gets sunburned as well. She gets lonely very easily, and often worries that everyone in the club will leave her, as they are one year older and will eventually graduate. Due to this, the rest of the girls buy her a turtle to look after, naming it Ton.
Outside of the band, she often hangs out with Ui and Jun whenever the other girls are busy. After the others graduate, she becomes the new light music club president alongside Ui and Jun, who decide to join her. Together with two new members, Sumire and Nao, they form a new band called "Wakaba Girls" (若葉ガールズ, Wakaba Gāruzu; lit. Fresh Leaf Girls). During the Wakaba Girls' first summer training camp, Azusa reveals to Sawako her belief that she is unable to act like a proper president for the light music club; however, Sawako suggests that there is no proper way to define what it means to be a president, and that Azusa will do just fine. While on that same training camp, Azusa is convinced by the others to become the band's vocalist despite her prior reservations on the issue.

=== Supporting ===
Sawako Yamanaka (山中 さわ子, Yamanaka Sawako)
Voiced by: Asami Sanada (Japanese); Karen Strassman (English)
Sawako is a music teacher who is the adviser for the wind instrument club at the girls' school. An alumna of the school and a member of the light music club in her student days, she does not want people to find out that she was formerly a member of a heavy metal band called Death Devil (of which she was both lead guitar and vocalist and went by the stage name of Catherine (キャサリン, Kyasarin)), thus she covers up by being mild and gentle to her coworkers and especially to students. She is forced to be the adviser of the light music club, as Ritsu blackmails her after the girls learn of her past. However, she is able to juggle being the adviser for the wind instrument club as well, even as the story progresses. Though she has a mature and gentle demeanor in the school, Sawako (affectionately addressed as Sawa-chan (さわちゃん, Sawa-chan) by both Ritsu and Yui) displays a totally different, completely authentic character when she is alone with the light music club. In reality, she is rather wild, lazy, and is quite an irresponsible teacher who enjoys dressing up the light music club in (sometimes embarrassing) cosplay costumes (like French maid uniforms), much to the dismay of Mio. She gets a thrill out of the rare moments where she is praised for her work.
She names the club band "Ho-kago Tea Time" after the members take too long deciding on a name themselves. In the anime, she once fills in for Yui with her white Epiphone "1958" Korina Flying V electric guitar. She becomes the girls' homeroom teacher in their third year, and puts Nodoka and all the band members (except Azusa, since she is a grade lower) in the same class, so she does not have to remember as many names. An episode in the second anime season reveals that she owned one of the first Gibson SG models (from around 1960 with a custom stoptail bridge) which is later sold. Due to her relation to the club members, the other students in her class start to call her Sawa-chan as well, ruining her image as a mild-mannered teacher. Her image is further ruined after Death Devil is temporarily reunited at a wedding reception for a high school alumnus. Regardless, her popularity with the students remains unchanged. In spite of her laziness, she still proves herself to be an able mentor, as shown by her willingness to coach Yui as the lead singer and attending their performances. Her music abilities apparently have not dulled over the years, as she is able to substitute for Yui at the school festival at almost no notice without the assistance of a music score, even without any prior practicing of the band's song. Sawako is also very perceptive: she immediately sees through Ui's disguise when she impersonates her sister and on several occasions boasts to the club that there is nothing she cannot see. Sawako is named after real-life Japanese rock musician Sawao Yamanaka from the band The Pillows.
Ui Hirasawa (平沢 憂, Hirasawa Ui)
Voiced by: Madoka Yonezawa (Japanese); Xanthe Huynh (English)
Ui is Yui's younger sister, who begins the story as a third-year junior high school student, but later enters Yui's high school the following year in the same class as Azusa. Unlike her older sister, Ui is mature, responsible, and handles household chores well. Despite these differences Ui shares a very strong relationship with Yui and has a great deal of love and admiration for her older sister that sometimes borders on a sister complex. She takes particularly good care of Yui and strives to look after her even at risk to her own health. Ui is considered to be the ultimate groupie for her sister's band and supports them with all her heart. She occasionally provides a narrative to the story. Despite being a year younger than Yui, she is nearly identical to her older sister with her hair down and is even able to fool members of the light music club on more than one occasion. However, Sawako Yamanaka can tell Yui and Ui apart easily, saying 'their bust sizes are completely different'. Ui is a fast learner, able to learn how to play the guitar after only a few days' practice. She is also able to play the organ if needed. She eventually joins the light music club along with Jun at the end of the series, becoming a guitarist like her sister, playing a Surf Green Fender Stratocaster electric guitar. Ui becomes fascinated with Sumire's sister-like relationship with Tsumugi upon learning of it, as Ui sees it as very similar to her feelings toward Yui.
Nodoka Manabe (真鍋 和, Manabe Nodoka)
Voiced by: Chika Fujitō (Japanese); Laura Bailey (English)
Nodoka is Yui's childhood friend and confidant who is a member of the school's student council. As a normal, well-mannered and intelligent girl, she is generally taken aback by the light music club's odd behavior, and easily gets annoyed with Ritsu whenever she forgets to fill in the club's application forms. She shares the same class as Mio in their second year, who appreciates her companionship tremendously, she being the only person Mio knows in her class. In her third year, she replaces Megumi Sokabe as the student council president and the Mio fan club president as well (after a while), the latter at Megumi's request. In her third year, she shares a class with the rest of Hokago Tea Time. Nodoka chooses to go to a national university as opposed to the same college as Yui and the others. Nodoka is named after guitarist Yoshiaki Manabe from the Japanese rock band The Pillows.
Jun Suzuki (鈴木 純, Suzuki Jun)
Voiced by: Yoriko Nagata (Japanese); Michelle Ann Dunphy (English)
Jun is an outgoing girl and a friend and classmate of both Azusa and Ui from before they joined the light music club. Ui at first tried to get Jun to join the light music club but ultimately failed due to a strange visit to the club room. Thanks to this experience, Jun stayed in the Jazz club instead. While there she played a Yamaha Sbv500 bass. Jun became one of Mio's admirers because they both play bass. Jun begins to regret not joining the light music club when she hears about all the activities they do and eventually joins the light music club at the end of the series. She attempted to play the guitar but she did not feel that it suited her. She has an older brother named Atsushi who also plays bass and regularly gives Jun lessons. Jun was embarrassed when the light music club found out that she was receiving these lessons because she felt it damaged her image as a person who could learn an instrument on their own. Jun owns a pet cat in the anime series.
Sumire Saitō (斉藤 菫, Saitō Sumire)
Sumire is a shy blonde girl who meets Azusa, Ui and Jun after Yui and the others graduate. She is a first-year, two years below the other light music club members. She is currently working in the Kotobuki household as a maid and originally came to the light music room to try to retrieve Tsumugi's teaset that was left behind after she graduated. After being scared off a few times by Sawako, she eventually agrees to join the light music club and eventually becomes its drummer. Similar to Tsumugi, she is quite talented at preparing tea, but feels inclined to keep her role as a maid a secret from the others due to the fear of being punished by Tsumugi. As her family, who came from Austria (Australia in the manga), were taken in by the Kotobuki household before she was born, Sumire grew up as Tsumugi's playmate, often regarding her as her older sister and inadvertently sparking Tsumugi's interest in yuri by introducing her to manga of that genre. As she grew up and learned the truth about the relation between the two families, Sumire felt she needed to regard Tsumugi with more respect while in public. Sawako reveals that Tsumugi asked that the tea sets be left in the club room. However, before the beginning of the new term Tsumugi had asked Sumire to remove the tea sets thereby ensuring that Sumire would encounter the other members of the light music club and would be invited to join. Sumire's situation is revealed to the surprise of the other members of the club by Sawako. Sumire uses her close ties with the Kotobuki family to reserve the use of their largest seaside villa for her first summer training camp with the light music club.
Nao Okuda (奥田 直, Okuda Nao)
Another first-year in the same class as Sumire. Generally poor at physical activities, Nao goes through several trial runs through various clubs before deciding to join the light music club, as she feels it is where she can try her best. Like the kanji in her name, she is overly honest about her shortcomings. After reading up on music theory, she ends up having an advanced knowledge of music but lacks the ability to physically play it. However, when she is introduced to music creation software, she decides to become the band's producer. She is the oldest among the five siblings in her family. When on her first training camp with the Wakaba Girls, Nao writes the lyrics for the band's first song, titled "Answer". She wrote the song to reflect Azusa's misgivings about her role as president of the light music club. Okuda remarks that she keeps track of all her band mate's conversations and behaviors by entering her observations into her computer, therefore she was able to describe Azusa's exact feelings in her lyrics.
Akira Wada (和田 晶, Wada Akira)
A new character introduced in the restarted manga who is in a band called OnNaGumi (恩那組, On Na-gumi; "Gang of Girls") with her friends Ayame and Sachi. Akira joins the university's light music club alongside Yui and her friends. She has short black hair and often looks intimidating whenever her hair is messy. She studies in the Education department along with Yui. She is easily irritated to a degree but finds herself in a similar position to Azusa from high school as Yui seems to enjoy hugging her. She originally had longer hair in high school, but when a boy she admired accused her band of only being popular because of their cuteness, she decided to cut off her hair and vowed to become popular through talent. She plays an ebony Gibson Les Paul Custom electric guitar which she nicknames "Rosalie".
Sachi Hayashi (林 幸, Hayashi Sachi)
One of Akira's friends, who has long hair. She is OnNaGumi's bassist and is in the same department as Mio. She is taller than Mio, and easily becomes embarrassed about her height if anyone mentions it.
Ayame Yoshida (吉田 菖, Yoshida Ayame)
Another one of Akira's friends, who has short blonde hair. She is OnNaGumi's drummer and is in the same department as Ritsu. Due to their similarities, Ayame and Ritsu become friends very quickly. Ayame tends to follow the latest fashion trends, and has done so since high school.
Kana Yoshii
The president of J. Women's University's light music club who has a sweet appearance, but is generally obsessed over things such as money and looking youthful and can put out a threatening aura when she gets passionate about either one. She was once in a popular band with Hirose though retired upon entering university since wearing school uniforms would be considered silly at their age. However, Kana is still obsessed with school uniforms.
Chiyo Hirose
An upperclassman in the light music club who was once in a band with Kana.
Megumi Sokabe (曽我部 恵, Sokabe Megumi)
Voiced by: Asumi Kodama (Japanese); Amanda C. Miller (English)
Megumi is the former student council president and founder of the Mio Fan Club (with Nodoka becoming her successor in both positions). She stalks Mio during her last few days in high school because she wanted to see Mio one more time. The band offers her a song as a graduation gift. Megumi becomes a good friend of Ritsu through unspecified circumstances much to Mio's surprise. She also helps Ritsu and Yui with the university entrance exams by giving them her old exam workbooks. She goes to the same woman's university in which Yui and her friends later enroll and lives in the same dorm as them.
Satoshi Tainaka (田井中 聡, Tainaka Satoshi)
Voiced by: Mika Itō (Japanese); Amanda Celine Miller (English)
Satoshi is Ritsu's younger brother. He seems to be a bit more mature his sister, usually saying things like "Geez, be more careful next time" when he has to take care of the problems she caused. Satoshi knows Mio Akiyama because she and Ritsu have been friends for so long, but becomes shy when Ritsu brings the rest of the Light Music Club home without telling him (Ritsu supposed it as a "rebellious phase"). He is also curious about his sister's doing and eavesdrops sometimes at her door (for example, when Mio and Ritsu were practicing for their class play, Ritsu finds out that Satoshi is laughing outside her room as she practices her dialogue). He also dislikes cold weather. Although he sometimes laughs about his sister or tells her to be quiet when she practices in her room, he still respects her and asks her for permission to hang out with his friends.

=== Shuffle characters ===
Yukari Sakuma (佐久間 紫, Sakuma Yukari)
The protagonist of K-On! Shuffle, Yukari is a first-year student and aspiring drummer who decides to get involved in a music club after watching the light music club at Sakuragaoka High School. She elects to play the drums as she enjoys the loud noises. Yukari has a sister Kurumi, who attends a different school.
Kaede Shimizu (清水 楓, Shimizu Kaede)
Yukari's childhood friend. She decides to play the bass after seeing Mio's wardrobe malfunction at the Sakuragaoka High School's light music club performance.
Maho Sawabe (澤部 真帆, Sawabe Maho)
Yukari and Kaede's classmate who sits between them and is part of the Basketball Club. Against her will, she is dragged into the Light Music Appreciation Society; despite being a member of another club, Yukari points out school rules allow for students to be in both a club and an appreciation society. She is the appreciation society's guitarist.
Riko Satō (佐藤 莉子, Satō Riko)
A second-year, Riko is the lone member of the Light Music Appreciation Society after the previous members had graduated or left. Although she claims to have never played an instrument, she is proficient in playing technique and music theory.

== Media ==
=== Manga ===
K-On! began as a four-panel comic-strip manga written and illustrated by Kakifly. The manga was originally serialized in Houbunsha's Manga Time Kirara manga magazine between the May 2007 and October 2010 issues, ending on September 9, 2010. The manga also appeared as a guest bimonthly serialization in Manga Time Kirara's sister magazine Manga Time Kirara Carat starting with the October 2008 issue. The manga relaunched from April 2011 to June 2012 in two separate magazines. Chapters published in Manga Times Kirara, from the May 2011 issue released on April 8, 2011, to the July 2012 issue released on June 9, 2012, focus on the main cast as they attend college. Chapters published in Manga Time Kirara Carat, from the June 2011 issue released on April 28, 2011, to the August 2012 issue released on June 28, 2012, focus on Azusa, Ui, and Jun as they continue the light music club.

Four tankōbon volumes were released between April 26, 2008, and September 27, 2010. The manga was licensed by Yen Press for English release, with the first volume released in North America on November 30, 2010. The college arc of the second manga run, titled K-On! College (けいおん! college), was released on September 27, 2012, and the high school arc, titled K-On! Highschool (けいおん! highschool), was released on October 27, 2012. Yen Press have also licensed these volumes in North America. In Indonesia, the series is licensed by Elex Media Komputindo. An anthology entitled Minna de Untan! (みんなでうん☆たん, Everybody's Untan!), which features several guest strips from various artists, was released in September 2009. An official anthology series, K-On! Anthology Comic (けいおん!アンソロジーコミック, Keion! Ansorojī Komikku), began sale from November 27, 2009, with five volumes released as of October 12, 2011, and two "Story Anthology Comics" were released on November 26, 2011. An illustration book with official art and fan art from well known dōjin artists was released on January 27, 2010.

A spin-off manga by Kakifly, titled K-On! Shuffle, began serialization in Manga Time Kirara on July 9, 2018. At Anime Expo 2022, Yen Press announced that they licensed K-On! Shuffle for English publication.

=== Anime series ===
A 13-episode anime adaptation directed by Naoko Yamada, written by Reiko Yoshida, and produced by Kyoto Animation aired between April 3 and June 26, 2009, on TBS in Japan. The episodes began airing on subsequent networks at later dates which include BS-TBS, MBS, and CBC. The TBS airings are in 4:3 ratio, and the series began airing in widescreen on BS-TBS on April 26, 2009. Seven Blu-ray/DVD compilation volumes were released by Pony Canyon between July 29, 2009, and January 20, 2010. An additional original video animation (OVA) episode was released with the final Blu-ray/DVD volumes on January 20, 2010. The Blu-ray/DVD volumes contained extra short anime titled Ura-On!

The series later began airing on Japan's Disney Channel from April 2011. Animax has aired the anime in Hong Kong, Thailand, and Taiwan. Both an English-subtitled and English-dubbed version by Red Angel Media began airing on March 16, 2010, on Animax Asia. At their industry panel at Anime Expo 2010, anime distributor Bandai Entertainment announced that they have acquired K-On! for a DVD and Blu-ray release, with Bang Zoom! Entertainment producing an English dub for the show. The series was released over four volumes in standard and limited editions for each format starting on April 26, 2011. Bandai released the full first season on DVD under their "Anime Legends" line on February 7, 2012. Manga Entertainment released the series in the UK in individual DVD volumes during 2011, and in a complete DVD of the first season on April 30, 2012. A planned Blu-ray box set release in 2012 was cancelled. Sentai Filmworks has licensed the first season and re-released the series on DVD on September 23, 2014. Sentai also re-released the series on Blu-ray on September 1, 2015.

It was displayed on screen at the Let's Go live concert in Yokohama, Japan on December 30, 2009, that a second season would be produced. The second season, titled K-On!! (with two exclamation marks), aired with 26 episodes on TBS in Japan between April 7 and September 29, 2010. An additional OVA episode was released with the final Blu-ray/DVD volumes on March 16, 2011. As with the first season, the Blu-ray/DVD volumes contained extra short anime titled Ura-On!!. This season has also aired on Animax Asia starting October 20, 2010. Sentai Filmworks licensed the second season and released the series on DVD and Blu-ray in two boxsets released on June 19, 2012, and August 28, 2012, respectively. The original English dub cast reprised their roles for this season.

The anime was broadcast on ABC Me in Australia, with episodes being hosted on ABC iview.

Netflix licensed the series and movie in the United States and Canada between November 2019 and November 2021.

==== Film ====
A film adaptation of K-On! was released in Japan on December 3, 2011. It follows the girls as they travel to London to celebrate their graduation. Developed as an original story, it was produced by Kyoto Animation with Naoko Yamada as the director. The film features the two songs "Ichiban Ippai" and "Unmei wa Endless" by Aki Toyosaki. The ending theme is "Singing" by Yōko Hikasa. The film opened at #2 with a gross of ¥317,287,427 (US$4,070,919) from 137 theaters, and has earned a total of ¥1,639,685,078 (US$21,419,792) by the end of its run.

The film features a London cafe inspired by the Troubadour Cafe in Earl's Court, and K-On! fans often visit the cafe. The film was released on Blu-ray and DVD on July 18, 2012. Sentai Filmworks released the film on Blu-ray/DVD in North America on May 21, 2013. Madman Entertainment released the film in Australia on Blu-ray/DVD. The film is made available to stream on The Criterion Channel in 2026.

==== Music ====
The first season anime's opening theme is "Cagayake! Girls" by the Sakura High School Light Music Club (Yui Hirasawa (Aki Toyosaki) with Mio Akiyama (Yōko Hikasa), Ritsu Tainaka (Satomi Satō) and Tsumuki Kotobuki (Minako Kotobuki), along with Azusa Nakano (Ayana Taketatsu) starting in episode nine). The ending theme is "Don't Say 'Lazy'" by the Sakura High School Light Music Club (Akiyama (Hikasa) with Hirasawa (Toyosaki), Tainaka (Satō) and Kotobuki (Kotobuki)). The opening and ending theme singles were released on April 22, 2009. A single containing the insert song "Fuwa Fuwa Time" (ふわふわ時間(タイム), Fluffy Time) used in episode 6 was released on May 20, 2009. A series of character song singles have been released containing songs sung by the voice actresses of the five main characters. The singles for Hirasawa (Toyosaki) and Akiyama (Hikasa) were released on June 17, 2009. The singles for Tainaka (Satō) and Kotobuki (Kotobuki) were delayed, but later released together with the single for Nakano (Taketatsu) on August 26, 2009. The singles for Ui Hirasawa (Madoka Yonezawa) and Nodoka Manabe (Chika Fujitō) were released on October 21, 2009. The anime's original soundtrack, largely composed by Hajime Hyakkoku, was released on June 3, 2009. The four songs highlighted in episode eight of the anime were released on the mini album Ho-kago Tea Time (放課後ティータイム; After School Tea Time) on July 22, 2009. The single "Maddy Candy" by Sawako's band Death Devil (sung by Sawako Yamanaka (Asami Sanada)) was released on August 12, 2009.

The second season's first opening theme is "Go! Go! Maniac" and the first ending theme is "Listen!!"; both songs are sung by After School Tea Time (Hirasawa (Toyosaki), Akiyama (Hikasa), Tainaka (Satō), Kotobuki (Kotobuki), and Nakano (Taketatsu)). The singles containing the songs were released on April 28, 2010. From episode 14 onwards, the respective opening and ending themes are "Utauyo!! Miracle" and "No Thank You", both by Ho-Kago Tea Time (Hirasawa (Toyosaki), Akiyama (Hikasa), Tainaka (Satō), Kotobuki (Kotobuki), and Nakano (Taketatsu)). The singles containing these songs were released on August 4, 2010. The single "Pure Pure Heart" also sung by After School Tea Time (Hirasawa (Toyosaki), Akiyama (Hikasa), Tainaka (Satō), Kotobuki (Kotobuki), and Nakano (Taketatsu)) was released on June 2, 2010. Another single, "Love", by Sawako's band Death Devil (Yamanaka (Sanada)) was released on June 23, 2010. A single sung by Toyosaki, "Gohan wa Okazu/U&I", was released on September 8, 2010. The composer Bice who wrote the song "Gohan wa Okazu" died on July 26, 2010, of a heart attack; the song was their final work. A second set of character song singles were released, starting with the singles for Yui (by Toyosaki) and Mio (by Hikasa) on September 21, 2010. The show's second album, Ho-kago Tea Time II, was released on both normal double CD and limited edition that came with a cassette tape on October 27, 2010. The second set of singles for Tainaka (Satō), Kotobuki (Kotobuki), and Nakano (Taketatsu) were released on November 17, 2010. The set of singles for Jun Suzuki (Yoriko Nagata), Hirasawa (Yonezawa), and Mamabe (Fujitō) were released on January 19, 2011. The singles and albums were released by Pony Canyon. A limited edition music box, K-ON! 7inch Vinyl "Donuts" BOX, was released at the Canime Summer Festival on August 11, 2012.

=== Video games ===
A rhythm video game titled K-On! Hōkago Live!! (けいおん! 放課後ライブ!!, Keion! Hōkago Raibu!!), developed by Sega for the PlayStation Portable, was released on September 30, 2010. The gameplay involves the player matching button presses in time with music featured in the anime. The game supports local multiplayer for up to five PSPs. The game features 19 songs from the first anime season and first set of character song CDs. The player can customize the clothing, hair style and accessories of the characters, plus customization of the light music room and Yui's bedroom. There is also a custom track maker. A remastered HD port of the game was released for the PlayStation 3 on June 21, 2012.

An arcade game developed by Atlus, K-On! Hōkago Rhythm Time (けいおん!放課後リズムタイム, Keion! Hōkago Rizumu Taimu), was released in Japanese arcades in Q2 2013. The game features rhythm gameplay and also awards trading cards that can be used to read songs into the game. A second arcade game by Sega titled K-On! Hōkago Rhythm Selection (けいおん！放課後リズムセレクション, Keion! Hōkago Rizumu Serekushon) was released on November 13, 2014.

Characters from the series also appear alongside the other Manga Time Kirara characters in the mobile RPG, Kirara Fantasia in 2018.

== Reception and legacy ==
=== Sales ===
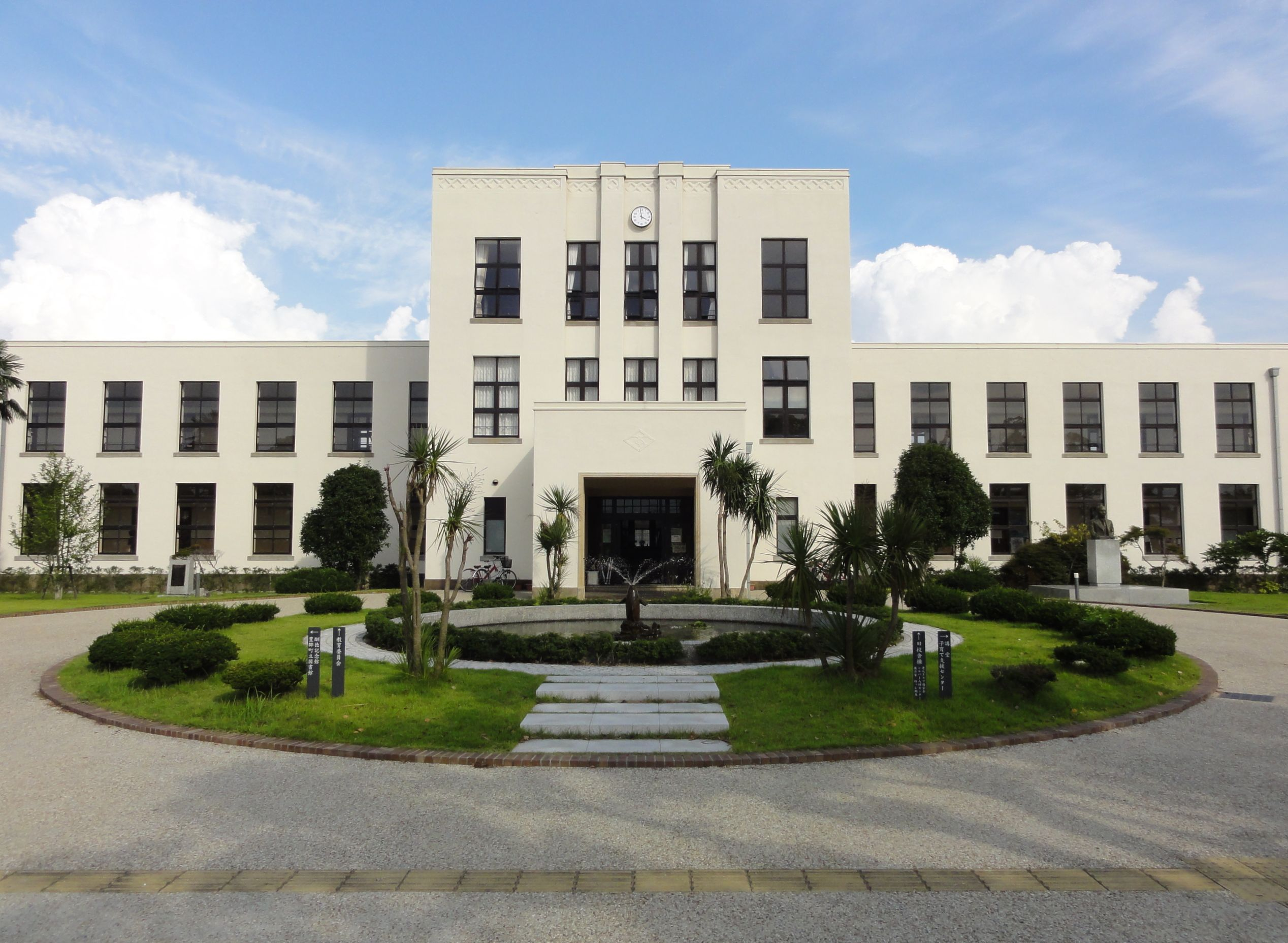
Fans of the anime visit the former elementary school in Toyosato, Shiga, which is used as a model for the high school in the anime.

The first manga volume of K-On! was the 30th highest-selling manga volume in Japan for the week of April 27 and May 3, 2009, having sold over 26,500 volumes that week. The following week, the first and second manga volumes were the 19th and 20th highest-selling manga volumes in Japan, having sold 23,200 and 22,500 volumes each the week of May 4 and May 10, 2009. By May 2009, the first two manga volumes each sold about 136,000 copies each. The third volume sold over 120,000 copies the week of December 14–20, 2009, and became the 46th top-selling manga in the first half of 2010 in Japan (ending May 23), selling over 328,000 copies.

The single for the first anime's opening theme, "Cagayake! Girls", debuted at fourth in the ranking on the Oricon weekly singles chart, selling approximately 62,000 copies. The ending theme "Don't Say 'Lazy'" debuted at second in the ranking, selling 67,000 copies. It was also awarded Best Theme Song at the 2009 (14th) Animation Kobe Awards. Additionally, "Cagayake! Girls" and "Don't Say 'Lazy'" were certified Platinum by the Recording Industry Association of Japan (RIAJ) for 250,000 full-track ringtone digital music downloads (Chaku Uta Full), respectively. The mini album Ho-kago Tea Time debuted at No. 1 on the Oricon weekly CD albums charts selling 67,000 copies, making it the first image song album credited to fictional anime characters that reached the highest position. The second anime's opening theme "Go! Go! Maniac" and ending theme "Listen!!" debuted at No. 1 and No. 2 in their first week of release on the Oricon singles chart, selling over 83,000 and 76,000 copies, respectively. "Go! Go! Maniac" became the first anime image song to ever top the singles chart and the band also became the first female vocalists to occupy the top two spots on the singles chart in 26 years since Seiko Matsuda in 1983. The season's second ending and opening themes, "No, Thank You!" and "Utauyo! Miracle" respectively, sold 87,000 and 85,000 in their first week and ranked at No. 2 and No. 3 in the Oricon charts respectively, only being beaten by SMAP's single, "This is Love". "No, Thank You!" and "Utauyo! Miracle" were certified Gold by the RIAJ in August 2010 for 100,000 copies shipped. The single "Gohan wa Okazu"/"U&I" debuted at No. 3 on the Oricon singles chart, selling 53,000 in its first week. The album Ho-kago Tea Time II debuted at No. 1 on the Oricon weekly CD albums charts selling 127,000 copies.

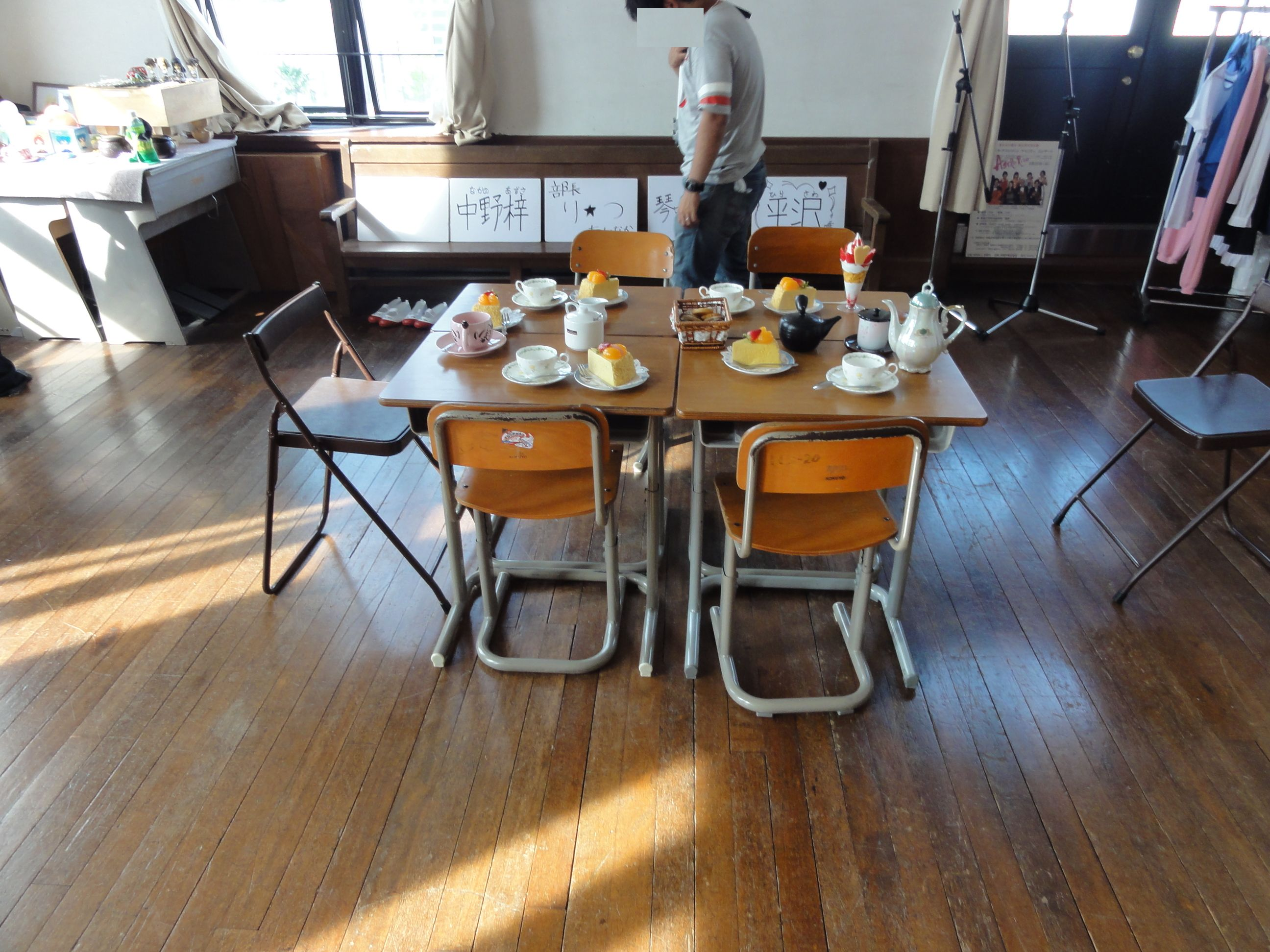
The room at the Toyosato Elementary School that served as the model for the room used by the Light Music Club in the anime. Fans have decorated the room with the items shown in the anime.

At the beginning of September 2010, the Kyoto prefectural government began using K-On!! to promote the census and encourage people to be counted. In 2011, Sharp and Bandai announced plans to jointly launch a calculator with designs of the characters from K-On! K-On! has influenced a string of tourism for the rural town of Toyosato, related to the phenomenon of the anime pilgrimage, home to the elementary school that was used as a model for the high school in the anime. The school has opened portions of itself to the public as an exhibit for the series. Matthew Li of Anime Tourist described the exhibit as, "A place that genuinely understands its fanbase and carries all the sentimental props one can remember from the show and more; housing items seen in the school, like a museum." The anime has also inspired real-life musicians. Hiroto, the bassist of The Sixth Lie, joined a band that was influenced by K-On! when he was in junior high school. In recent years, K-On! has been seen by critics as one of the series that helped to popularise the anime and manga genre of Cute Girls Doing Cute Things.
