= Romantica Clock =

Manga and television anime

- Cover of Romantica Clock vol. 1 by Shueisha.

ロマンチカ クロック (Romanchika Kurokku)
- Genre: Romantic Comedy
- Manga
- Written by: Yōko Maki
- Published by: Shueisha
- Magazine: Ribon
- Original run: August 2012 – June 2016
- Volumes: 10
- Anime television series
- Original network: TV Tokyo
- Original run: February 4, 2014 – February 25, 2014
- Episodes: 3

Romantica Clock (ロマンチカ クロック, Romanchika Kurokku) is a Japanese manga series by Yōko Maki, serialized in Shueisha's shōjo manga magazine Ribon from August 2012 to June 2016. It had been collected in ten tankōbon volumes. An anime television series adaptation aired from February 4 to February 25, 2014, as a segment on TV Tokyo's children's television series Oha Star.

== Characters ==
Akane Kajiya (加治屋 杏花音, Kajiya Akane)
Voiced by: Ai Kayano
The younger sister of the twins. She is energetic and a member of a karate/kendo club. She views Aoi, her older twin brother, as an eternal rival because they were always compared to each other when they were younger. As the series progresses, she learns much more about her brother and what he thinks.
Aoi Kajiya (加治屋 蒼, Kajiya Aoi)
Voiced by: Kaito Ishikawa
The older brother of the twins. Opposite from Akane, he is calm and is good at studying. In the beginning of the story, he is dull and does not go to school until one day Akane tells him to go. He holds number one in exams ever since. Aoi seems to be the only character in the series that does not express his feelings easily.
Karin (香鈴)
Best friends with Aoi and Akane since their childhood. She seems to understand the both of them more than anybody, one for being always there with Akane and developing feelings for Aoi. Karin later confesses her feelings to Aoi and it is not known if he returns them.
Eri Tsujiri (辻莉 正, Tsujirī Eri)
Voiced by: Tomoaki Maeno
A student at Akane and Aoi's school whom Akane has a crush on. He is serious and is dedicated to studying. He views Akane as energetic and doesn't think that he would ever understand her.
Wakana Shinohara (篠原 若菜, Shinohara Wakana)
An advanced student in Aoi's second middle school year class. She does not appear to like Aoi truthfully, only trying to make him marry her in the future to hold her magnificent family name. Later it is revealed that the one she liked was Tsujiri. Wakana eventually becomes friends with Akane and Karin.
Kiritani Shin (慎)
A character who is older (although mistaken to be younger) than the main characters by one year who appears later in the series. He works as a sales person for a cake shop and can make sweets. Shin seems to hold feelings for Akane and has two older brothers.

== Reception ==
Volume 7 reached the 35th place on the weekly Oricon manga chart and, as of January 18, 2015, has sold 25,784 copies.
