= Yōko Maki (artist) =

Japanese manga artist (born 1981)

- Born: Yōko Fuke; July 11, 1981 (age 45); Kagoshima Prefecture, Japan
- Occupation: Manga artist

Yōko Maki (槙ようこ, Maki Yōko; born July 11, 1981) is a Japanese former manga artist. Maki debuted in 1999 with Love Service! in Ribon Original magazine. She also has a pet dog named Leo and her profile in the Aishiteruze Baby comic says her hobby is "...blowing soap bubbles" and that one of her skills is "...passing quickly through a crowd of people". She has a sister, Mochida Aki, which she made manga with such as, Zen Zen.

On July 3, 2019, Maki announced that she has retired from the manga industry and that she will keep her Instagram account active until March 17, 2020. Her final manga series was Kirameki no Lion Boy which ran from 2016 to 2019.

== Works ==
- 14R — Collection of short stories, containing:
  - 14R
  - Mahiru ni Kakedasu
  - Watakushi-sama
  - Koi o Hajimeru Bokutachi ni
  - Daily News
- Aishiteruze Baby (7 volumes)
- Atashi wa Bambi (3 volumes) — Also includes:
  - Kokoro Kirari (vol.1)
  - Aiko de Jo (vol.2)
  - Kiite Kiite Ouji (vol.3)
  - Survival (vol.3)
- Kareki ni Koi o Sakasemasu — Collection of short stories, containing:
  - Kareki ni Koi o Sakasemasu
  - Heavy Crash!!
  - Juicy Game
  - Love Service!
- Sora Sora — Also includes:
  - Koishiterururu
- Star Blacks (2 volumes)
- Taranta Ranta (2 volumes)
- Yamamoto Zenjirou to Moushimasu (5 volumes)
- Aishitenai
- Shouri no Akuma
- Zen Zen
- Green Boy & Blue Girl
- Romantica Clock (10 volumes)
- Kirameki no Lion Boy (9 volumes)
