= Miyū Tsuzurahara =

Japanese actress

Miyū Tsuzurahara (黒葛原 未有, Tsuzurahara Miyū; born October 30, 1994) is a Japanese actress. She was born in Saitama and is affiliated with Himawari Theatre Group.

== Filmography ==
=== Television animation ===
- Ghost in the Shell: Stand Alone Complex (2002) - Moe
- Aishiteruze Baby (2004) - Yuzuyu Sakashita
- Mushishi (2005) - Aya (younger - episode 17); Tanyuu (younger - episode 20)

=== OVA ===
- Final Fantasy VII Advent Children (2005) - Marlene Wallace

=== Theatrical animation ===
- Colorful (2010)

=== Dubbing ===
- Signs – Bo Hess (Abigail Breslin)
- The Sound of Music (50th Anniversary edition) – Marta (Debbie Turner)
- Stanley – Mimi & Marci
