= Aishiteruze Baby =

Japanese manga series

- First tankōbon volume cover, featuring Kippei Katakura and Yuzuyu Sakashita

愛してるぜ ベイベ★★ (Aishiteruze Beibe★★)
- Genre: Romance
- Manga
- Written by: Yōko Maki
- Published by: Shueisha
- English publisher: NA: Viz Media
- Magazine: Ribon
- Original run: April 2002 – January 2005
- Volumes: 7
- Anime television series
- Directed by: Masaharu Okuwaki
- Studio: TMS Entertainment
- Original network: Animax
- Original run: 3 April 2004 – 9 October 2004
- Episodes: 26
- icon

Aishiteruze Baby (愛してるぜ ベイベ★★, Aishiteruze Beibe★★; also known as I Love You, Baby) is a Japanese romance manga series written and illustrated by Yoko Maki. It was serialized by Shueisha in Ribon from April 2002 and January 2005 and collected in seven bound volumes. It was adapted as a 26-episode anime television series produced by TMS Entertainment and Animax, broadcast in Japan on Animax from April to October 2004. The series is about a teenage boy, Kippei, who becomes the caretaker of his five-year-old cousin, Yuzuyu, after her mother abandons her. Both the manga and anime have been praised for successfully mixing serious issues with a light-hearted tone.

== Plot ==
Aishiteruze Baby is a series that revolves around the life of Kippei, a popular high-school playboy who flirts with any girl he sees, without thinking about their feelings. His life is turned upside down when one day his aunt abandons his five-year-old cousin Yuzuyu at his house. Kippei is assigned the task of taking care of Yuzuyu for the time being, and he must learn how to become the "mother" she needs. As Kippei learns how to care for Yuzuyu, he also learns to care for Kokoro, a quiet girl at his school, who helps him out.

In Japanese, aishiteru ze (愛してるぜ) is a casual, masculine way of saying "I love you" (see Gender differences in spoken Japanese).

== Characters ==
Kippei Katakura (片倉 結平, Katakura Kippei)
Voiced by: Daisuke Fujita
Kippei is a 17-year-old promiscuous high school student, well known for his playboy habits. However, due to his friendly personality, he is very popular at school. One day, his 5-year-old cousin, Yuzuyu, is suddenly placed in his care. At first, Kippei is unsure of how to take care of his cousin. When he realizes that taking care of Yuzuyu is a full-time job, he drops his promiscuous ways. As the story progresses, Kippei matures quickly into a responsible "parent," making sure Yuzuyu is his top priority. Not only does Kippei wake up early every day to make Yuzuyu lunch, but he also walks her to and from her preschool. In addition, he cares for Yuzuyu's psychological well-being in the absence of her mother. Meanwhile, Kippei also pursues his love interest, Kokoro Tokunaga, whom he finds to be a great woman. Eventually, Kippei, realizing how lonely Kokoro is living by herself, asks his family to let her move in with them, which they quickly agree to. Near the end of the manga, Yuzuyu's mother returns to take Yuzuyu back but Kippei's mother refuses until her sister can prove to her that she is ready. Despite this, and his attachment to Yuzuyu, Kippei understands that she needs her mother and insists on letting Yuzuyu leave with her mother. At the end of volume seven, about 10 years have passed. Yuzuyu appears to be a happy teen and Kokoro is still living with Kippei, presumably they have married (which now makes her Kokoro Katakura). The manga ends with Yuzuyu's letter to Kippei, thanking him for taking care of her when she was young.

Yuzuyu Sakashita (坂下 ゆずゆ, Sakashita Yuzuyu)
Voiced by: Miyū Tsuzurahara
Yuzuyu ("Yuzu" for short) is a bubbly little 5-year-old girl. Having been abandoned by her mother, Yuzuyu begins to adapt to her new life with Kippei as her guardian. As the story progresses, Yuzuyu grows very attached to Kippei. When Yuzuyu meets Kokoro, she is scared Kokoro will take Kippei away from her. However, she eventually warms up to Kokoro and they become friends. Throughout the series, Yuzuyu struggles with the absence of her mother and is often seen crying herself to sleep. Yuzuyu tries her best in hopes that her mother will one day come back for her which conflicts with her wish to stay with Kippei. At the end of volume seven, Yuzuyu is a happy teenager who has reunited with her childhood friend, Shouta. She starts most of her sentences with "yuzu"-(ゆず).

Kokoro Tokunaga (徳永 心, Tokunaga Kokoro)
Voiced by: Fumina Hara
Kokoro is a pretty classmate of Kippei. Because she lost her mother at a young age, she has a quiet personality. Her father quickly remarried and left Kokoro to fend for herself in a luxurious apartment, believing that because she was quiet, she would prefer to live alone. This is not the case, however, and she feels extremely lonely living by herself with no one else to rely on. Kokoro initially despises Kippei for his promiscuous ways. However, after seeing how gentle he is and how much he cares for Yuzuyu, Kokoro begins to fall in love with him. Kokoro sympathizes with Yuzuyu and understands Kippei's responsibility for Yuzuyu. As such, she lets him get away with a lot of idiotic behavior. At the end of volume six, for a brief time, Kokoro believes she is pregnant, only to find out that it was a false alarm. However, she admits to Kippei that she had hoped she was pregnant, despite the problems that would arise, because it would mean that she would be able to spend more time with him. Soon after, Kokoro moves in with Kippei's family. At the end of the manga, Kokoro and Kippei are living with his parents and it is implied that they are married (which now makes her Kokoro Katakura).

Misako Katakura (片倉 三沙子, Katakura Misako)
Voiced by: Shizuka Okohira
Misako is Kippei's mother who is a school crossing guard, among other things. She teaches Kippei how to cook, starting with onigiri (rice balls) because they are Yuzu's favorite food. She is the older sister of Aunt Miyako (Yuzu's biological mother).

Reiko Katakura (片倉 鈴子, Katakura Reiko)
Voiced by: Kumiko Endou
Better known as Nee-chan (or "Sis" in the English version), Reiko is Kippei's bold and controlling older sister. She is a cosmetologist and everyone in Kippei's family follows her orders. She is known for her stylish outfits and nails. She has a secret which she reveals to Kippei late in the series that she cannot have any children. This greatly influences how she feels about Aunt Miyako for abandoning Yuzuyu.

Miyako Sakashita (坂下 都, Sakashita Miyako)
Voiced by: Chie Hirano
Miyako is the younger sister of Misako and the biological mother of Yuzuyu. She found that taking care of Yuzuyu by herself after her husband had died was more than she could handle. She later admits to Kippei that she once struck Yuzuyu and it is inferred that her fear of doing so again is the main reason why she left Yuzuyu with his family. She intends to come back once she can be a proper mother to Yuzuyu. At the end of the manga, she returns and takes Yuzuyu back. Years later, Yuzuyu is shown to be a healthy and happy teen.

Satsuki Katakura (片倉 皐, Katakura Satsuki)
Voiced by: Masami Suzuki
Satsuki is Kippei's 12-year-old brother. He is very intelligent and mature for his age, so much so that he seems emotionless. Although he does not like children in general, he gets along with Yuzuyu very well. Near the end of the story it is assumed that Ayumi and Satsuki are in a relationship.

Aki Kagami (鏡 亜希, Kagami Aki) and Mai Motoki (元木 舞, Motoki Mai)
Voiced by: Maki Saitō (Aki) and Fuyuka Oura (Mai)
Kokoro's friends. They, and especially Aki, do not approve much of Kokoro and Kippei's relationship, given his past actions and reputation. Rather than being busybodies, they really just want what is best for Kokoro. Aki is in love with Shin.

Shouta Nashiya (ナシヤ翔太, Nashiya Shōta)
Voiced by: Shun Miyazato
One of Yuzuyu's best friends and her first love. Kippei is unhappy that Yuzuyu has a crush on him. When Shouta first meets Yuzuyu, the two become instant friends and begin to do everything together. Shouta loves his family dearly, however, he has been abused by his mother for some time. When Yuzuyu witnessed Shouta being hit, she began to cry and scream, and the entire preschool, as well as the parents, found out about him and his mother. Kippei is greatly affected by Shouta's being abused and tries to help by talking to the child's mother. Shouta later gets a concussion from a fall, precipitated by his mother, which results in a trip to the hospital. The doctors notice the signs of previous injuries and on their recommendation his parents decide to go into family counseling and move in with Shouta's grandparents for more support. When he leaves, he promises Yuzuyu that he will always be her friend. While separated, they remain in contact with each other. Eventually, he and Yuzuyu meet again as teenagers.

Miki Sakashita (坂下ミキ, Sakashita Miki)
Voiced by: Mika Itō
Miki is Yuzuyu's 14-year-old cousin on her father's side. Volume 4 of the manga is mostly Miki's story. In the manga, she carries a knife, which was changed to a bike chain in the anime. Miki attended a prestigious school where she witnessed a teacher beating a fellow classmate. When she confronted her teacher, everything backfired. She was harassed by her peers and teacher, but refused to tell her parents. Kippei notices the burns and scars on her wrists, indicating that Miki engaged in self-harm. She tries to take Yuzuyu away from the Katakura residence so that her parents will have a substitute for her when she attempts suicide, which Kippei prevents. (In the anime, she intends to jump from a building, in the manga she uses a knife.) In the end, the issues between her and her parents are resolved. She appears again in Volume 6.

Marika (まりか) and Ken (健)
Voiced by: Aoi Yūki as Aoi Yabusaki (Marika) and Yūtarō Honjō (Ken)
Yuzuyu's friends from preschool. While Marika can be quite stuck-up for a five-year-old, Ken is kind and strong. Marika develops a crush on Kippei-onii-chan (as Yuzuyu calls Kippei) after he catches her when she trips – to the point that when her mother arrives to pick her up, she demands that her mother provide her with an onii-chan of her own. She is also jealous of the girls with whom he shows up at the pre-school (usually Kokoro). Marika is Yuzuyu's best friend.

Shin Tabata (田端 芯, Tabata Shin)
Voiced by: Makoto Ueki
Kippei's friend and classmate. He and Aki have feelings for each other.

Natsumi (ナッツ, Natsumi)
Voiced by: Akiko Kawase
Called "Nattsu" for short, she is Kippei's former "girlfriend" (more of a "friend with benefits" since it is implied that they have had sexual intercourse in the past). Since Yuzuyu's arrival, Nattsu misses hanging out with Kippei the way they used to. Although she enjoyed spending time with him, Nattsu had no interest in having a serious relationship with Kippei. The distance enforced by Kippei's responsibilities towards Yuzuyu have made Nattsu realize that she really cares for him (and has had feelings for him for some time). Unfortunately for her, her previous indifference means that she has lost her chance at Kippei since he is now serious about Kokoro.

Ayumi Kubota (久保田 あゆみ, Kubota Ayumi)
Voiced by: Saeko Chiba
Ayumi is Satsuki's classmate and works part-time as a model. She is four centimeters taller than Satsuki and secretly in love with him. Ayumi's friends decide to twit her about her feelings for Satsuki by making up rumors about Satsuki's preferences in girls which are the exact opposite of her appearance. Undaunted, she builds up the nerve to confess to him and is pleasantly surprised when Satsuki tells her that he does not mind any of her traits. She is later seen eating dinner at the Katakura house and is presumed to be Satsuki's girlfriend.

Aya Oga (大賀 綾, Ōga Aya) and Akari Oga (大賀 あかり, Ōga Akari)
Akari is Kippei's classmate and her sister, Aya, goes to Yuzuyu's daycare where they are friends. Their situation is similar to that of Kippei and Yuzuyu in that Akari must take care of her sister because her parents are always working. Akari confides in Kippei which, among other things, results in trouble. They only appear in the manga.

Itagaki (板垣)
Itagaki is a boy from Kippei's school who has a crush on Kokoro. He confesses to her and even forces a kiss on her, scaring Kokoro and making her afraid of being touched, even by Kippei. Everything is resolved during a school trip when Kippei warns Itagaki that he will kill him if he does anything to Kokoro. After this, Itagaki no longer appears in the manga.

== Media ==
=== Manga ===
The manga Aishiteruze Baby was written and illustrated by Yoko Maki. It was serialized by in Ribon magazine from April 2002 to January 2005 by Shueisha. The serial chapters were collected in seven tankōbon volumes under the Ribon Mascot Comics imprint. It is licensed in North America by Viz Media, which has released all seven volumes in English starting in April 2006. It is also licensed in France by Génération Comics, in Italy by Panini Comics, in Germany by Tokyopop Germany, and in South Korea by Seoul Media Group.

No.	Original release date	Original ISBN	English release date	English ISBN
1	15 November 2002	4-08-856416-2	4 April 2006	1-4215-0711-0
2	15 April 2003	4-08-856452-9	6 June 2006	1-4215-0569-X
3	8 August 2003	4-08-856484-7	1 August 2006	1-4215-0570-3
4	15 January 2004	4-08-856515-0	3 October 2006	1-4215-0571-1
5	14 May 2004	4-08-856536-3	4 December 2006	1-4215-0572-X
6	15 October 2004	4-08-856565-7	6 February 2007	1-4215-1005-7
7	15 March 2005	4-08-856594-0	3 April 2007	1-4215-1006-5

=== Anime ===
Aishiteruze Baby was adapted into an anime television series by TMS and Animax. It was directed by Masaharu Okuwaki, with music by Miki Kasamatsu and character designs by Junko Yamanaka and Masatomo Sudo. The opening theme was "Sunny Side Up" performed by Yo Hitoto, and the ending theme was "Nennensaisai" (年年歳歳; literally "Years-Years-Old-Old" or "Year In, Year Out" and a play on baby-talk for "go to sleep") performed by Yo Hitoto.

The series was initially broadcast in 26 episodes across Japan on Animax from 3 April 2004 to 9 October 2004. It is licensed in France by Taifu Video.

#	Title	Original release date
1	"She (Yuzu) is ★ 5 Years Old!" "Kanojo (Yuzu) wa go sai" (Japanese: 彼女(ゆず)は★5歳!)	3 April 2004
Kippei Katakura is the handsome playboy of the school. He receives a phone call after school from his family telling him to go home right away. At home he discovers his 5 year-old cousin, Yuzuyu, is staying with them. Reiko tells him that he is the one to be primarily responsible for taking care of her.
2	"Yuzu's Rice ball!" "Yuzu no Onigiri!" (Japanese: ゆずのおにぎり!)	10 April 2004
Kippei makes onigiri for Yuzu's lunch. When a boy laughs at her onigiri, she slaps him. Kippei tries to find out what is wrong.
3	"Where's Mama" "Mama wa doko" (Japanese: ママはどこ)	17 April 2004
The other children at the preschool do not want to play with Yuzu because she is motherless. A girl at his school is stalking Kippei.
4	"Yuzu's Crayons" "Yuzu no Kureyon" (Japanese: ゆずのクレヨン)	24 April 2004
When Yuzu is momentarily alone in a park, Kippei's stalker tells her that Kippei's family hates Yuzu and throws away Yuzu's crayons. Yuzu thinks she needs to make Kippei like her.
5	"The Reason for Tears" "Namida no Riyū" (Japanese: ナミダの理由)	8 May 2004
Kippei wonders why Yuzu would not tell him what happened to her crayons. The next morning Kippei promises to pick up Yuzu right after school, but on the way he runs into an old lady who needs help with directions. While Yuzu is waiting, the stalker comes to pick on her some more.
6	"Bye-Bye, Yellow Hat" "Baibai Kiiroi Bōshi" (Japanese: バイバイ黄色い帽子)	15 May 2004
While Yuzu is playing in the sand, her classmate, Marika, says that Yuzuyu is a show-off because her uniform is different than everyone else. Reiko and Kippei buy her a uniform for her current school, but she wants to wear the old uniform.
7	"One, Two! Pudding!" "Oitchi ni! Purin!" (Japanese: おいっちに!プリン!)	22 May 2004
The preschool has an athletic day.
8	"Mr. Bear and Carrot and Papa and Mama" "Kuma-san to Ninjin to Papa to Mama" (Japanese: クマさんとニンジンとパパとママ)	29 May 2004
Miyako sends a letter to Kippei's family stating she still is not coming back yet, along with another letter addressed to Yuzu. Kippei gives the letter to Yuzu without reading it. Class seats are changed, and Kippei ends up sitting next to Kokoro. Yuzu and Miyako separately remember their time together.
9	"Kokoro All Alone" "Hitoribotchi Kokoro" (Japanese: ひとりぼっちの心)	5 June 2004
Kokoro moves out of her father's house into an apartment because he is getting remarried. When Kippei and Yuzu are returning home from the market, they see Kokoro at her new apartment.
10	"Jealousy" "Yakimochi" (Japanese: やきもち)	12 June 2004
Kippei and Kokoro pick up Yuzu from school. When they go to the park, Kokoro tells Yuzu that she does not like Kippei. The next day, Yuzu thinks she needs to be less dependent on Kippei so he can spend time with Kokoro, so she tries to walk home from school by herself.
11	"Dumplings, Yuzu, and Kokoro" "Odango to Yuzu to Kokoro" (Japanese: おだんごとゆずと心)	19 June 2004
Yuzu gets lost walking home. Kippei, his family, and Kokoro look for her. Kippei finally finds Yuzu late at night. Yuzu tells him why she tried to walk home alone. Kippei tells Kokoro that they cannot spend time together because he needs to focus on Yuzu. Kokoro agrees.
12	"Yuzu's Errand ♪" "Yuzu no Otsukai ♪" (Japanese: ゆずのおつかい♪)	26 June 2004
Yuzu has the day off from school, so she makes a packed lunch for Kippei and delivers it to him at school.
13	"Mama..." "Mama..." (Japanese: ママ...)	3 July 2004
When Miyako keeps looking into the preschool playground, the teachers ask Kippei to get rid of the suspicious person. Miyako tells Kippei that she is still not ready to take Yuzu, but she is glad she is happy, and asks him not to tell anyone that she came by.
14	"Shouta-kun from Cherry Blossom Group" "Sakuragumi no Shōta-kun" (Japanese: さくらぐみの翔太くん)	10 July 2004
Yuzu meets a boy named Shouta from another preschool class. After playing in the water fountain, Yuzu sees a large bruise on Shouta's abdomen. Natsu tries to get Kippei to go with her to a mall so she can buy stuff with a couple's discount, but he tells her he likes someone else. Later she tells her friend that she thinks she loves Kippei.
15	"Big Sister Goes to Parents' Day!" "Onee-sama Tankanbi ni Iku!" (Japanese: おねぇさま参観日に行く!)	17 July 2004
Reiko and Kippei go to Yuzu's Parents' Day at the preschool. When Yuzu and Kippei see a new bruise on Shouta, Yuzu tells Kippei about the other bruise she saw previously. Shouta does not follow the teacher's instructions, so his mother tells him that he has embarrassed her and takes him into the hallway. Yuzu cries when she sees Shouta's mother hit him. Kippei confronts Shouta's mother, who abruptly leaves.
16	"Shou-chan, Let's Meet Again..." "Shō-chan, Mata ne..." (Japanese: しょーちゃん、またね...)	24 July 2004
The next day, Kippei is still distressed by Shouta's family situation. Kokoro tries to console him. Kippei confronts Shouta's mother outside her apartment building and urges her to seek help. When she goes inside, Shouta accidentally makes her drop her groceries. She hits Shouta, who falls down the stairs and is knocked unconscious. A neighbor calls emergency services. At the hospital, a doctor confronts Shouta's parents about his bruises and suggests they get counseling. Later Yuzu and Kippei see Shouta's family moving out. Shouta's mother says they are going to live with Shouta's grandparents in the country and get help. Yuzu and Shouta say goodbye.
17	"It's a Pool, It's a Bathing Suit, I'm Scared" "Pūru da, Mizugi da, Kowaimon" (Japanese: プールだ、水着だ、こわいもん)	7 August 2004
Kippei takes Yuzu to a pool to cheer her up after Shouta moving away, but Yuzu is afraid of getting water in her nose. Kokoro and her friends also turn up at the pool while Kippei is trying to get Yuzu to go underwater. After Kokoro and Yuzu spend some time together without Kippei, Yuzu decides to try to go underwater again. On the way home, Kippei and Yuzu meet Miki.
18	"Miki-chan with the Red Hair" "Akai Kami no Miki-chan" (Japanese: 赤い髪のミキちゃん)	14 August 2004
Miki tells Kippei's family that her family wants to take Yuzu. Reiko calls Miki's parents, who come over and deny that they want to take Yuzu. When Miki's father slaps Miki, she runs away. Kippei goes to find her and discovers that she has purposefully hurt herself a number of times.
19	"Let's Walk in a Line" "Narande Arukō" (Japanese: 並んで歩こう)	21 August 2004
Miki tells Yuzu that she wants Yuzu to replace her in her family after she kills herself. Kippei makes Miki do chores around the house as long as she lives with them. Miki seems to become less extreme. When Miki follows Kippei to school on "Go to School Day," she sees Kippei kiss Kokoro. Miki goes back and tricks Yuzu into leaving with her.
20	"Let's Go Home" "Ouchi e kaerō yo" (Japanese: おウチへかえろうよ)	28 August 2004
Miki takes Yuzu to her house, where she sees her parents having a party with relatives. She realizes her parents would not miss her, so she does not need Yuzu to replace her. Miki calls Kippei to tell him where Yuzu is. When Kippei gets there, he talks Miki out of killing herself. Later Miki's parents take her back.
21	"Summer is Ending..." "Natsu no owari ni..." (Japanese: 夏のおわりに...)	4 September 2004
Kokoro and her friends are mad at Kippei for not calling Kokoro even once over the summer as he had promised to do. Miki comes back for her things. At Kippei's school, she sees a guy in the art club confess to Kokoro.
22	"When I Grow Up" "Okkikunattara" (Japanese: おっきくなったら)	11 September 2004
Satsuki takes Yuzu to preschool because Kippei has the flu. On the way, they meet Ayumi, whom Yuzu recognizes as a model she has seen in ad posters. At preschool, the children talk about what they want to be when they grow up. Yuzu says she wants to be a model like Ayumi, but Marika tells Yuzu that models are really tall. Later, Kippei's family shows Yuzu a photo album with pictures from when Reiko, Kippei, and Satsuki were small. Ayumi tells her friends she likes Satsuki. Her friends decide to tease her and tell her that Satsuki does not like tall girls with long hair. Later she tells him she likes him, anyway.
23	"Two Box Lunches" "Obento ♥ futatsu" (Japanese: おべんと♥ふたつ)	17 September 2004
Kippei makes two box lunches, one for Yuzu and one for Kokoro. Kokoro gives her lunch to Kippei in return for him making one for her. While they eat, her father calls asking her to collect the rest of her things from the house, although she does not tell anyone about the call. At preschool, the children are supposed to write a letter to someone important to them. Marika decides to write a letter to Yuzu, but Yuzu writes her letter to Kippei. Yuzu offers to change her letter, but Marika tells her to keep it as it is. Yuzu tells Marika they are still friends. At her apartment, Kokoro tells Kippei she does not want to get any closer to him.
24	"A Letter to Your Favorite Person" "Daisuki na Hito e no Tegami" (Japanese: 大スキな人への手紙)	25 September 2004
Kippei decides to write a letter to Kokoro like the one Yuzu wrote to him. He puts it in Kokoro's mailbox at her apartment. Kokoro does not go to school the next day. Later that night, she sees Kippei's letter.
25	"Mama's Pajamas" "Mama no Pajama" (Japanese: ママのパジャマ)	2 October 2004
Yuzu has a dream and realizes she does not remember her mother's face. She looks for an old pair of pajamas that her mother made for her. She wears them, even though they are now too small for her. Kippei accidentally tears them while he was tickling Yuzu. Kippei buys Yuzu new pajamas, but Yuzu still wants to wear the old ones. The next day at school, Kokoro finds Kippei on the roof trying to fix the old pajamas. Kippei convinces Kokoro to pick up Yuzu from preschool so Kokoro and Yuzu can have some time together.
26	"I Love Everyone, Everyone" "Minna ★ Minna ★ Aishiteru" (Japanese: みんな★みんな★愛してる)	9 October 2004
Kokoro and Yuzu talk about their mothers, then Kokoro takes Yuzu home. Kippei's family meets Kokoro and invites her to stay for dinner. Kippei returns the repaired pajamas to Yuzu. Yuzu says she is going to wear the new pajamas, but she is still going to keep the old ones. Meanwhile, Reiko has flown to Fukuoka to meet with Miyako. Miyako reaffirms that she intends to take Yuzu back, but she still is not ready to do that yet. Kokoro stays the night with Kippei and Yuzu.

== Reception ==
According to the German manga journal MangasZene, Aishiteruze Baby is drawn in a style of manga, with non-uniform panel layouts and frequent use of screentones. The reviewer praised the clean use of backgrounds, well-differentiated character designs, and Maki's handling of delicate issues such as the rival, Miki, and parental abandonment, while still keeping a comic tone. The same article described anime adaption as one of the anime highlights of 2004. The reviewer criticized the art of the anime adaptation as not as successful as the manga, being done in a simpler style, but praised the Japanese voice actors as well as mood-setting of the opening song, "Sunny Side Up."

A reviewer at THEM Anime Reviews praised the anime as "a touching and heartfelt drama," giving it 5 out of 5 stars. The reviewer cited the character of Yuzuyu as part of the success, as "a kid who actually acts like a kid and not like a little adult." The reviewer noted that the animation was "somewhat low-budget," and that the character designs only somewhat resemble the Maki's designs in the original manga.
