= Mika Itō =

Japanese voice actress (born 1984)

- 伊藤 実華
- Born: March 25, 1984 (age 42); Tokyo
- Occupation: Voice actress
- Website: threetree.co.jp/mika

Mika Itō (伊藤 実華, Itō Mika; born on March 25, 1984) is a Japanese voice actress who was born in Tokyo, Japan. She is affiliated with the entertainment office Three Tree.

== Filmography ==
=== Anime television series ===
- Aishiteruze Baby – Miki Sakashita
- AM Driver – Ivan Nyrguise (young)
- Aquarian Age: Sign for Evolution – Lemon
- Boogiepop Phantom – Arisa Nishi
- Buzzer Beater – Lenny
- Dance in the Vampire Bund – Yuzuru
- Eyeshield 21 – Torakichi
- Ginga Legend Weed – Teru
- InuYasha – Kaede (young)
  - InuYasha: The Final Act – Kaede (young)
- Kenkō Zenrakei Suieibu Umishō – Tomoko Naruko
- Kino's Journey – Girl A (ep 3)
- K-On! – Satoshi Tainaka
  - K-On!! – Satoshi Tainaka
- Mushishi – Saki, Taku (young)
- Noir – Rosalie
- Over Drive – Takeshi Yamato (young)
- Overman King Gainer – Afar
- School Rumble – Haruki Hanai (young)
- Sora o Miageru Shōjo no Hitomi ni Utsuru Sekai – Munto (young)
- Sugar Sugar Rune – Karen Manabe, Tarō Moriyama
- Witchblade – Naomi
- Yu-Gi-Oh! 5D's – Rally Dawson

=== Original video animation ===
- FLCL – Eri Ninamori

=== Video games ===
- Yu-Gi-Oh! 5D's: Tag Force 4 – Rally Dawson

=== Dubbing ===
- The Following – Joey Matthews (Kyle Catlett)
