= Toyosato, Shiga =

Toyosato 豊郷町
- Town
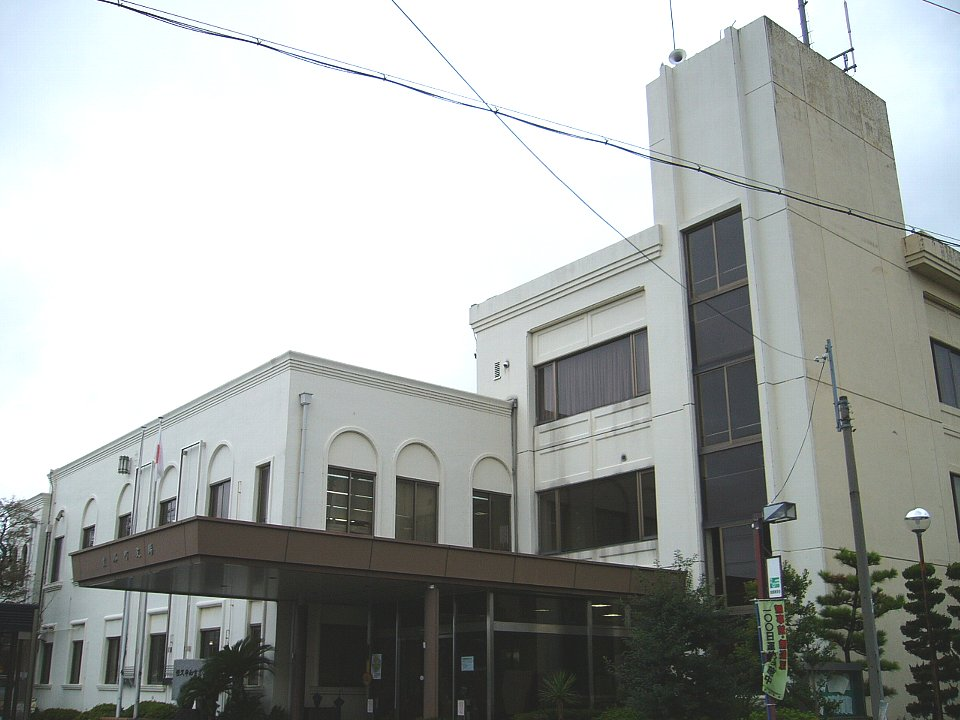
- Toyosato Town Hall

- Flag Emblem

- Coordinates: 35°12′1.17″N 136°13′47.52″E
- Country: Japan
- Region: Kansai
- Prefecture: Shiga Prefecture
- District: Inukami

Government
  - Mayor: Sadamu Itō

Area
  - Total: 7.80 km^{2} (3.01 sq mi)

Population (July 2021)
  - Total: 7,296
  - Density: 935/km^{2} (2,420/sq mi)
- Time zone: UTC+9 (Japan Standard Time)
- Phone number: 0749-35-8111
- Address: 375, Ishibatake, Toyosato-chō, Inukami-gun, Shiga-ken 529-1169
- Website: Official website
- Symbols
- Flower: Rhododendron
- Tree: Quercus phillyraeoides

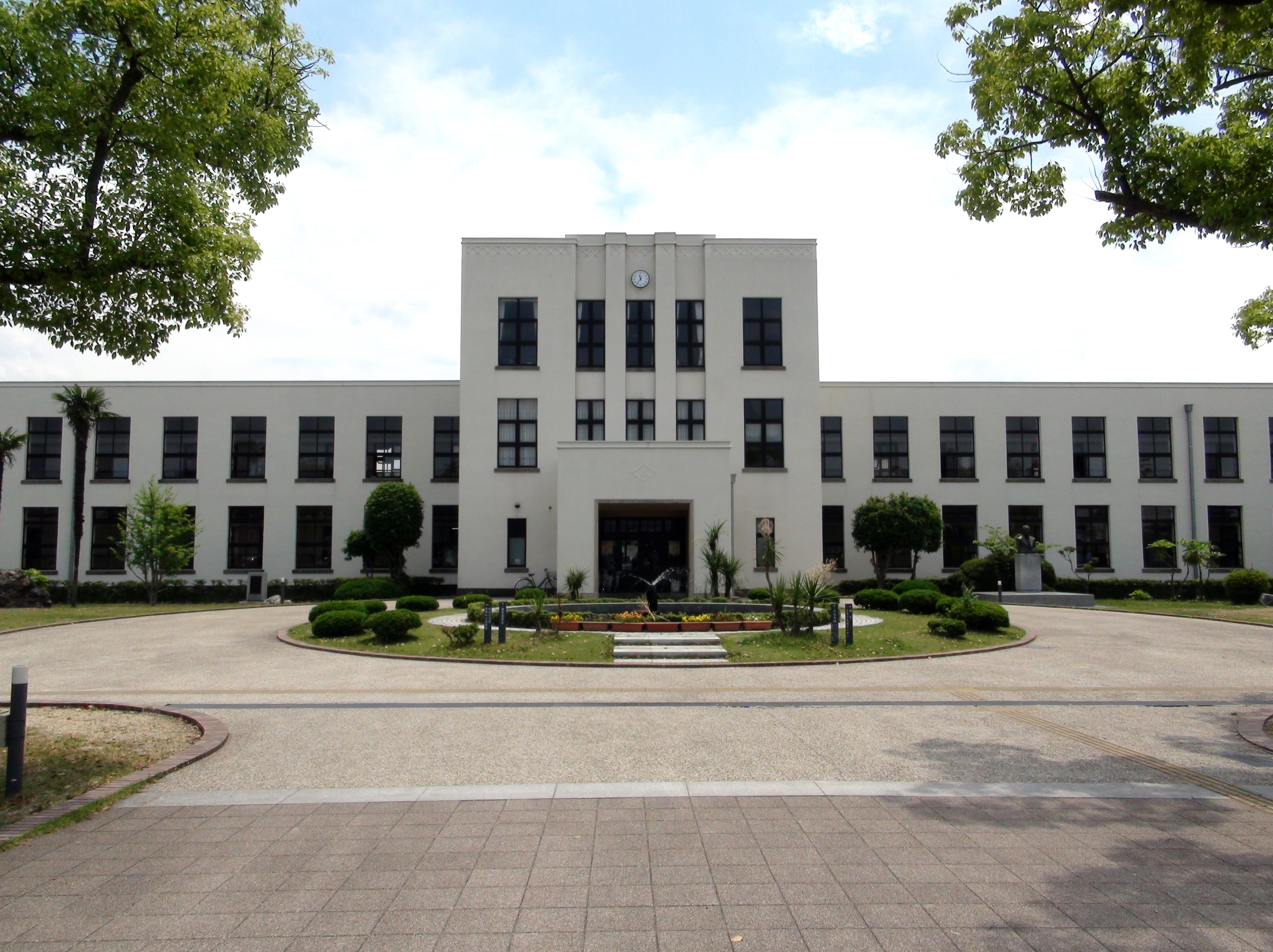
Toyosato Elementary School old building

Toyosato (豊郷町, Toyosato-chō) is a town located in Shiga Prefecture, Japan. As of 1 July 2021, the town had an estimated population of 7,296 in 3074 households and a population density of 940 persons per km^{2}. The total area of the town is 7.80 square kilometres (3.01 sq mi). It is the home of Gōshū ondo, a traditional folk dance.

== Geography ==
Toyosato is the smallest municipality in Shiga in terms of surface area. It is located on an alluvial fan of the Inukami River in central Shiga Prefecture. The entire area is a lowland with almost no undulations (highest point 115m, lowest point 95m).

=== Surrounding municipalities ===
Shiga Prefecture

- Aishō (south)
- Hikone (north and west)
- Kōra (east)

=== Climate ===
Toyosato has a humid subtropical climate (Köppen Cfa) characterized by warm summers and cool winters with light to no snowfall. The average annual temperature in Toyosato is 14.1 °C. The average annual rainfall is 1810 mm with September as the wettest month. The temperatures are highest on average in August, at around 25.9 °C, and lowest in January, at around 2.7 °C.

== Demographics ==
Per Japanese census data, the population of Toyosato has remained relatively steady over the past century, with a noticeable uptick around 1950 due to World War II.

Historical population
Year	Pop.	±%
1920	6,647	—
1930	6,371	−4.2%
1940	6,009	−5.7%
1950	8,017	+33.4%
1960	7,242	−9.7%
1970	7,020	−3.1%
1980	7,194	+2.5%
1990	7,396	+2.8%
2000	7,132	−3.6%
2010	7,570	+6.1%
2020	7,132	−5.8%

== History ==
=== Pre-modern ===
The area of Toyosato was part of ancient Ōmi Province and (after the Taika Reform) corresponds to Inukami District Achiki Township and Aichi District Yoshida Township. It is claimed that the area was settled during the Kofun period by immigrants from Baekje, centered on what is now the Achiki Shrine. From the Heian period, the area was divided between several shoen landed estates, and a number of settlements arose along the route of the Tōkaidō highway connecting Heian-kyō with the eastern provinces of Japan. The merchants in these villages formed guilds controlling the transport of Japanese paper, which was mostly made in Mino Province to Kyoto, Ise and Owari. During the Nanboku-chō and into the Sengoku period, the area was hotly contested between the Kyōgoku clan and the Rokkaku clan, and many mount fortifications were constructed. During the Edo period, the entire area of the town was part of the holdings of Hikone Domain under the Tokugawa shogunate. "Ōmi merchants" were very active and prospered during this period, notably the Fujino family, which had trading posts in Ezo and who were active in local politics, and the Ito family, which founded the Marubeni and Itochu trading houses.

=== Modern era ===
The village of Toyosato was created on April 1, 1889, with the establishment of the modern municipalities system. During the Meiji period the area suffered from repeated droughts, which led to the development of some of Japan's first agricultural cooperatives and investment in groundwater irrigation. Toyosato annexed the neighboring village of Achi in 1956 and was elevated to town status on February 11, 1956.

== Government ==
Toyosato has a mayor-council form of government with a directly elected mayor and a unicameral city council of 11 members. Toyosato, collectively with the other municipalities of Inukami District, contributes one member to the Shiga Prefectural Assembly. In terms of national politics, the town is part of Shiga 2nd district of the lower house of the Diet of Japan.

== Economy ==
Agriculture has dominated the local economy since ancient times. Manufacturing includes a number of small to medium-sized textile, chemicals, and metals processing factories.

== Education ==
Toyosato has two public elementary schools and one public middle school operated by the town government. The town does not have a high school.

== Transportation ==
=== Railway ===
Ohmi Railway – Main Line

- Toyosato

=== Highway ===
- National Route 8

== Local attractions ==
- Achiki Jinja, Shinto shrine, Prefectural Registered Tangible Cultural Property and Prefectural Scenic Site
- Furukawa Family Residence, National Registered Tangible Cultural Property
- Ito Chubei Memorial Hall, former home of the wealthy merchant Ito Chubei.
- Senju-ji, Rinzai school Buddhist temple
- Toyo Kaikan Museum, former home of the wealthy merchant Fujino Kihei.
- Toyosato Elementary School Old School Buildings, designed by William Merrell Vories. The model for the "Sakuragaoka High School" school building that appears in the 2009 TV anime K-On! (Kyoto Animation Production).
- Former Toyosato Hirotsugu High School Main Building, built in 1887. A National Registered Tangible Cultural Property
- Yuen-ji, Buddhist temple said to have been founded by Gyogi
