= Asahino Station =

Railway station in Higashiōmi, Shiga Prefecture, Japan

Asahino Station 朝日野駅
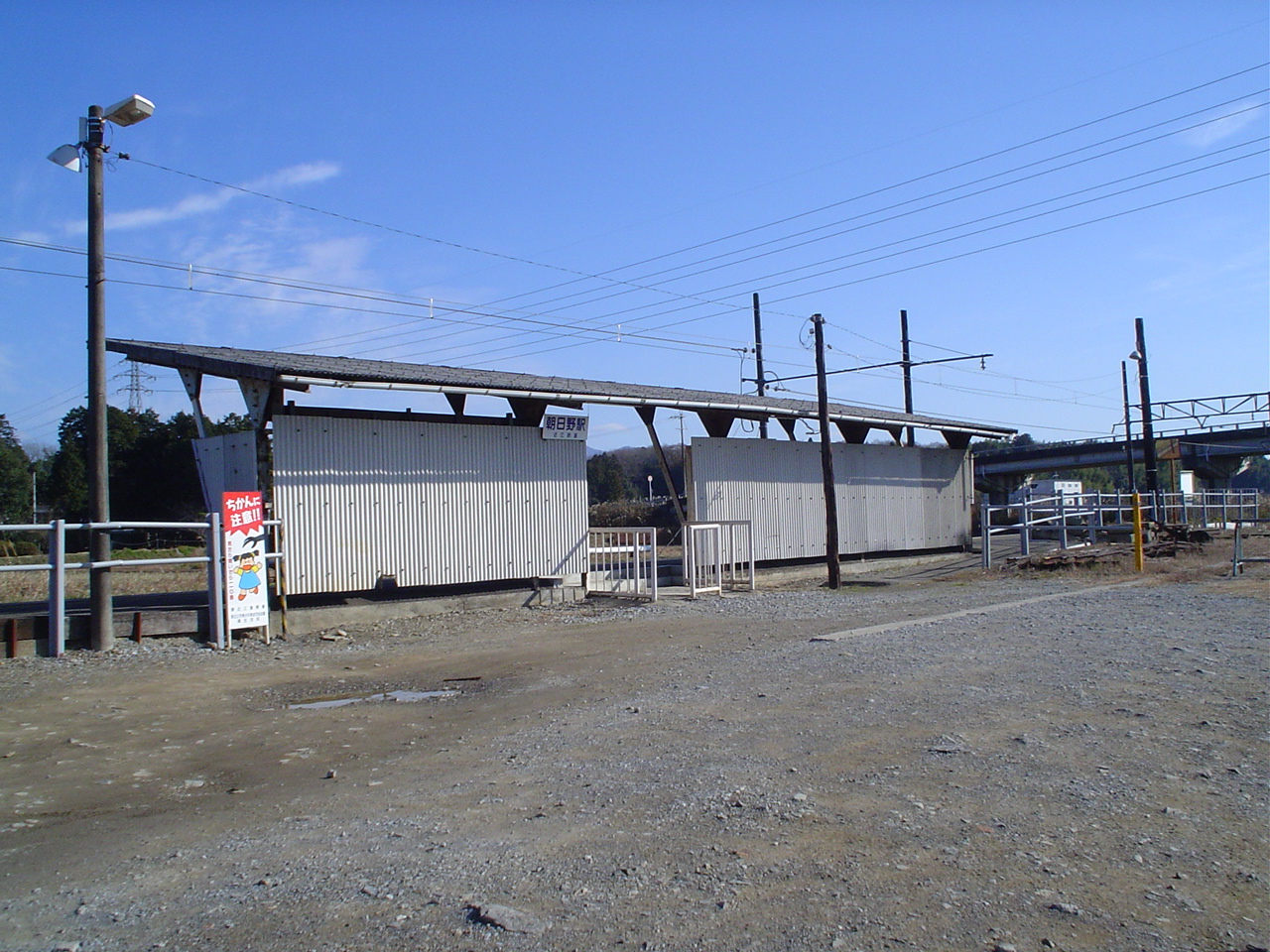
- Asahino Station, December 2008

General information
- Location: 903-2 Imonoshi-chō, Higashiōmi-shi, Shiga-ken 529-1655; Japan
- Coordinates: 35.0315°N 136.2056°E
- Operator: Ohmi Railway
- Line: ■ Ohmi Railway Main Line
- Distance: 35.2 km from Maibara
- Platforms: 1 side platform

Other information
- Station code: OR31
- Website: Official website

History
- Opened: December 28, 1900

Passengers
- FY2019: 28 daily

Services
Preceding station	Ohmi Railway	Following station
Asahi Ōtsuka	Main Line local service	Hino
Location
- Location within Shiga Prefecture Location within Japan

Asahino Station (朝日野駅, Asahino-eki) is a passenger railway station in located in the city of Higashiōmi, Shiga Prefecture, Japan, operated by the private railway operator Ohmi Railway. It is on the border of the city, and the platform extends into the neighboring town of Hino.

== Lines ==
Asahino Station is served by the Ohmi Railway Main Line, and is located 37.8 rail kilometers from the terminus of the line at Maibara Station.

== Station layout ==
The station consists of one side platform serving a single bi-directional track. There is no station building, but only a shelter on the platform. The station is unattended.

== Platforms ==
■ Main Line	for Hikone and Maibara for Yokaichi, Kibukawa and Omi-Hachiman

== Adjacent stations ==
«	Service	»
Ohmi Railway Main Line
Rapid: Does not stop at this station
Asahi Ōtsuka	Local	Hino

== History ==
Asahino Station was opened on December 28, 1900.

== Passenger statistics ==
In fiscal 2019, the station was used by an average of 28 passengers daily (boarding passengers only).

== Surroundings ==
- Takeda Shrine
- Asahino Post Office

== See also ==
- List of railway stations in Japan
