= Newton College =

Newton College may refer to:

- Newton College (Japan)
- Newton College (Peru)

== See also ==
- Newton College of the Sacred Heart
- Newton Abbot College
- Newton Theological College
