= Sakuragawa Station =

Sakuragawa Station (桜川駅) is the name of two train stations in Japan:

- Sakuragawa Station (Osaka)
- Sakuragawa Station (Shiga)
