= Daigaku-mae Station (Shiga) =

Railway station in Higashiōmi, Shiga Prefecture, Japan

Daigaku-mae Station 大学前駅
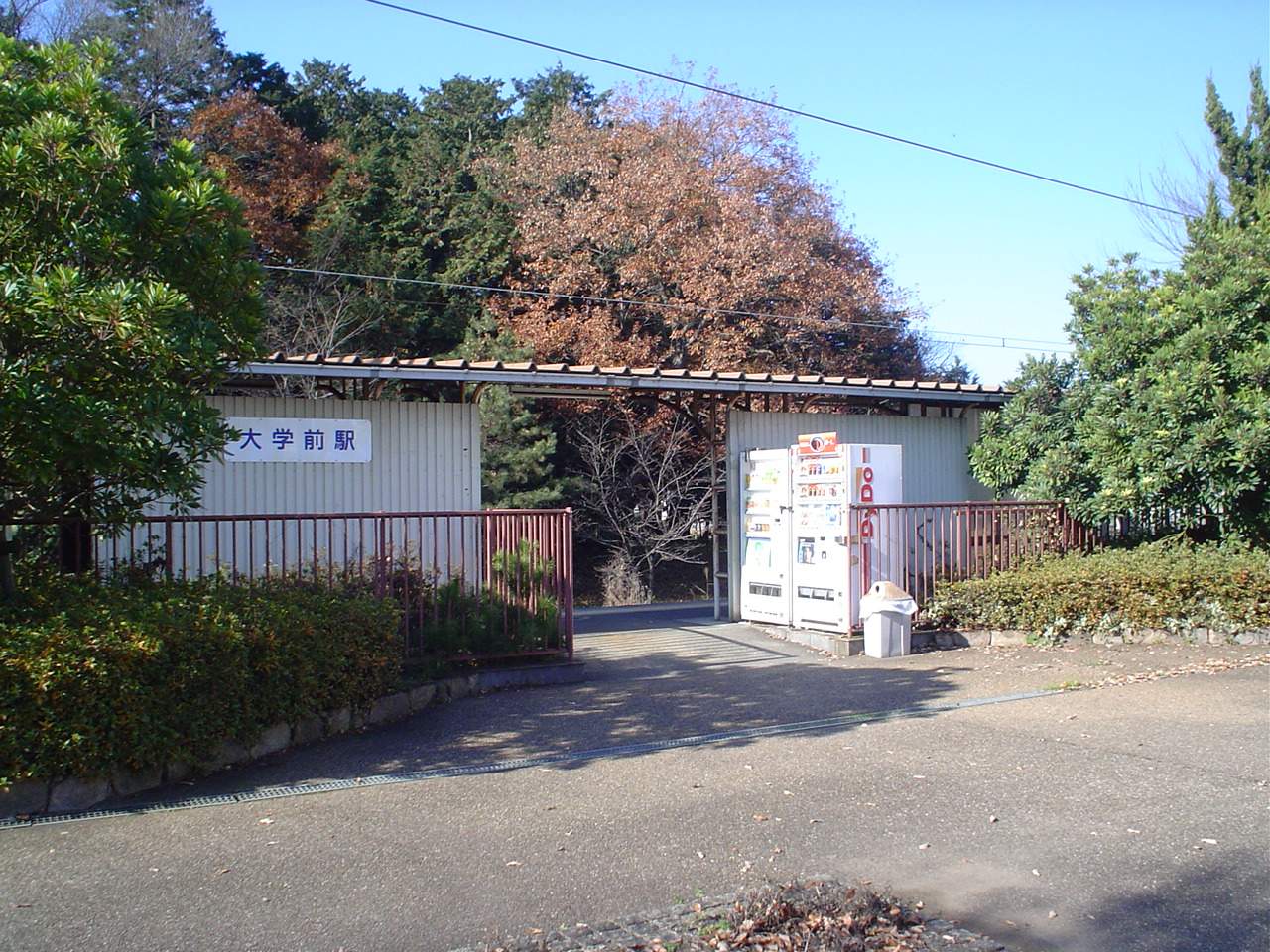
- Daigaku-mae Station, December 2008

General information
- Location: 29-2 Fuse-chō, Higashiōmi-shi, Shiga-ken 527-0081; Japan
- Coordinates: 35°05′16″N 136°11′05″E
- Operator: Ohmi Railway
- Line: ■ Ohmi Railway Main Line
- Distance: 28.4 km from Maibara
- Platforms: 1 side platform

Other information
- Station code: OR27
- Website: Official website

History
- Opened: March 29, 1990

Passengers
- FY2019: 102 daily
Location
- Location within Shiga Prefecture Location within Japan

Daigaku-mae Station (大学前駅, Daigaku-mae-eki) is a passenger railway station in located in the city of Higashiōmi, Shiga Prefecture, Japan, operated by the private railway operator Ohmi Railway. It is the station of Biwako Gakuin University.

== Lines ==
Daigaku-mae Station is served by the Ohmi Railway Main Line, and is located 28.4 rail kilometers from the terminus of the line at Maibara Station.

== Station layout ==
The station consists of one side platform serving a single bi-directional track. The station is unattended.

== Platforms ==
■ Main Line	for Hikone and Maibara for Yokaichi, Kibukawa and Omi-Hachiman

== Adjacent stations ==
«	Service	»
Ohmi Railway Main Line
Rapid: Does not stop at this station
Nagatanino	Local	Kyocera-mae

== History ==
Daigaku-mae Station was opened on March 29, 1990.

== Passenger statistics ==
In fiscal 2019, the station was used by an average of 102 passengers daily (boarding passengers only).

== Surroundings ==
- Biwako Gakuin University
- Higashiomi City Nunobiki Athletic Park Athletics Stadium

== See also ==
- List of railway stations in Japan
