= Hino Station (Shiga) =

Railway station in Hino, Shiga Prefecture, Japan

Hino Station 日野駅
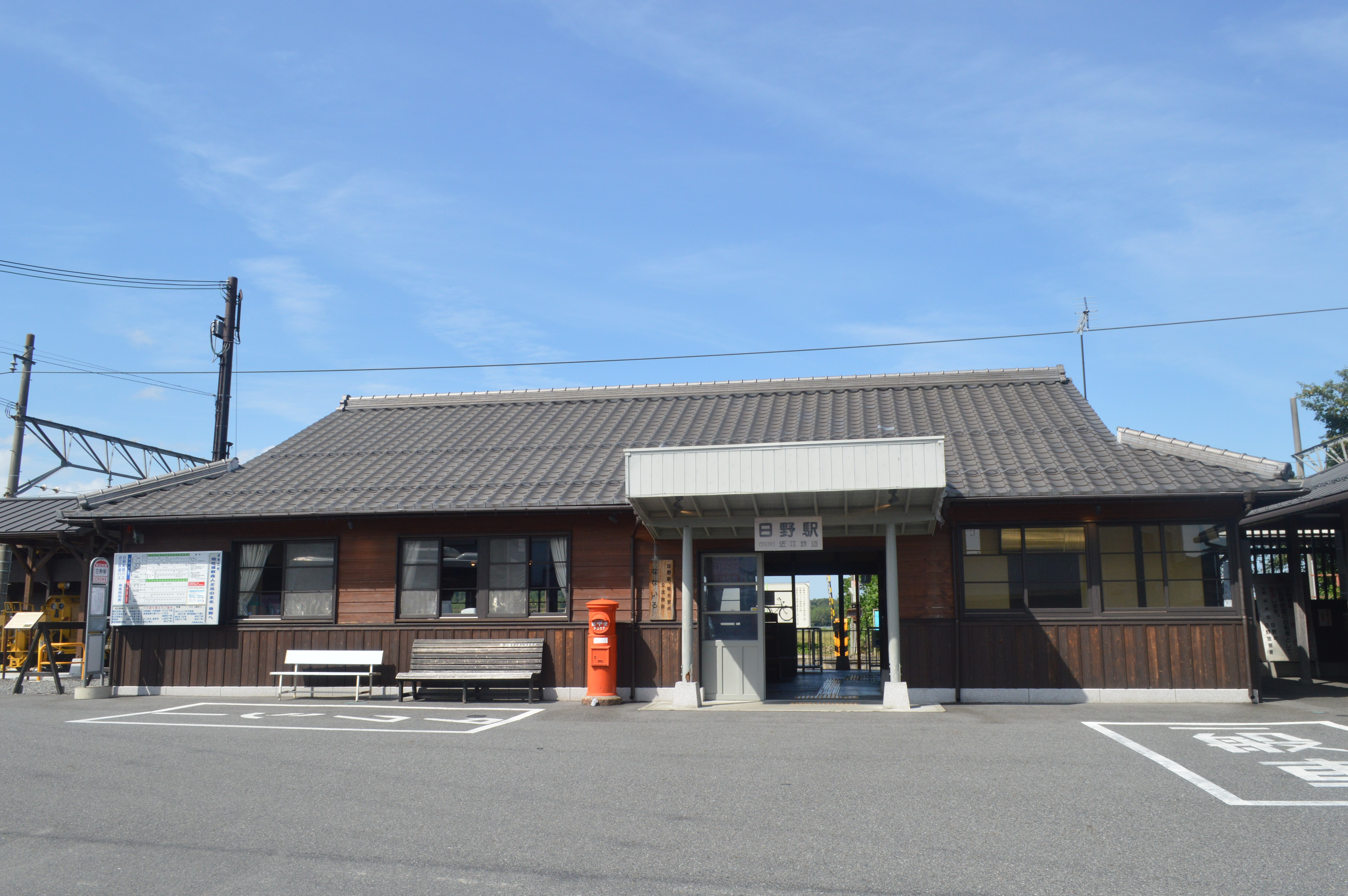
- Hino Station, 2022

General information
- Location: 903-2 Imonoshi-chō, Higashiōmi-shi, Shiga-ken 529-1655; Japan
- Coordinates: 35°00′44″N 136°13′11″E
- Operator: Ohmi Railway
- Line: ■ Ohmi Railway Main Line
- Distance: 37.8 km from Maibara
- Platforms: 2 side platforms

Other information
- Station code: OR32
- Website: Official website

History
- Opened: October 1, 1900.

Passengers
- FY2018: 472 daily
Location
- Location within Shiga Prefecture Location within Japan

Hino Station (日野駅, Hino-eki) is a passenger railway station in located in the town of Hino, Shiga Prefecture, Japan, operated by the private railway operator Ohmi Railway.

== Lines ==
Hino Station is served by the Ohmi Railway Main Line, and is located 37.8 rail kilometers from the terminus of the line at Maibara Station.

== Station layout ==
The station consists of two unnumbered opposed side platforms connected by a level crossing.

== Platforms ==
■ Main Line	for Hikone and Maibara for Yokaichi, Kibukawa and Omi-Hachiman

== Adjacent stations ==
«	Service	»
Ohmi Railway Main Line
Sakuragawa	Rapid	Minakuchi
Asahino	Local	Minakuchi Matsuo

== History ==
Hino Station was opened on October 1, 1900. In 2017, plans to demolish the old station building were opposed by local residents in favor of preservation, and after remodeling the old station building is now used as a cafe, tourist information center and museum.

== Passenger statistics ==
In fiscal 2018, the station was used by an average of 472 passengers daily (boarding passengers only).

== Surroundings ==
- Shiga Prefectural Road 183 Hino Tokuhara Line
- Hino Municipal Hissa Elementary School
- Hino Town Hall

== See also ==
- List of railway stations in Japan
