= Ohmi Railway Main Line =

Railway line in Shiga Prefecture, Japan

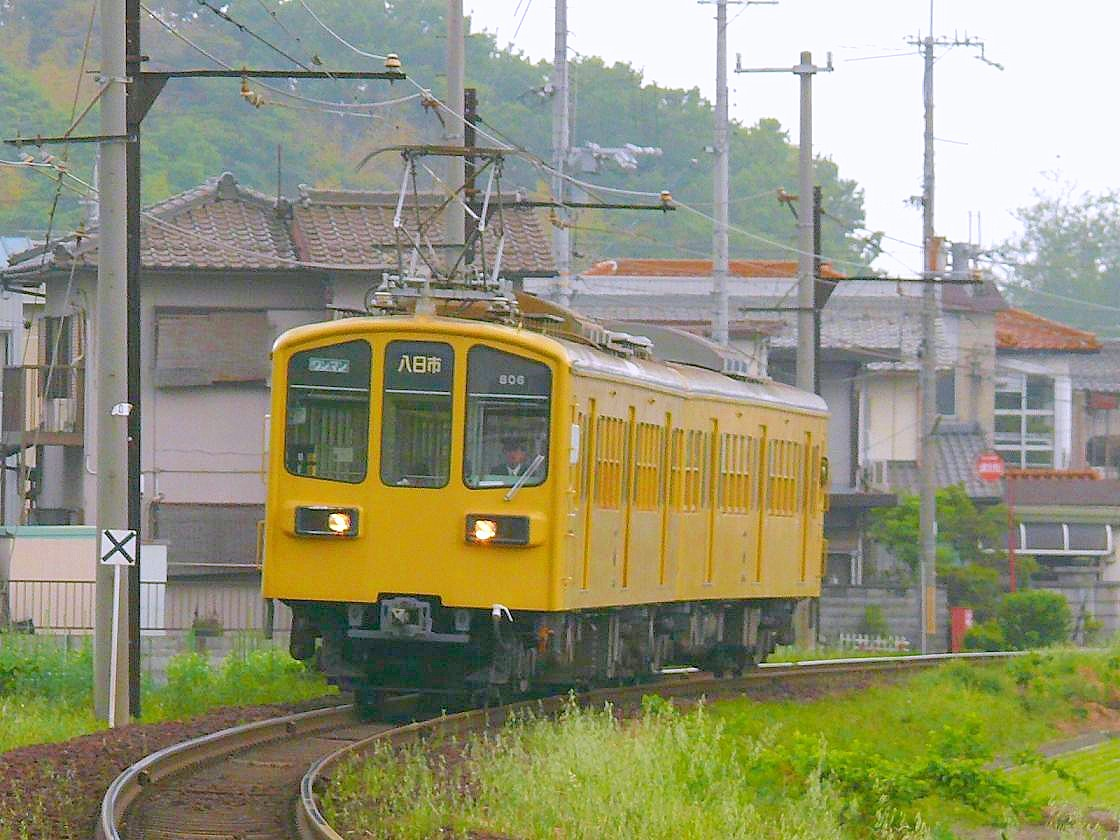
- Ohmi Railway Main Line

Overview
- Native name: 近江鉄道本線
- Owner: Ohmi Railway
- Termini: Maibara; Kibukawa
- Stations: 25
- Website: www.ohmitetudo.co.jp

Service
- Type: Commuter rail
- Operator(s): Ohmi Railway

History
- Opened: June 10, 1898 (Hikone to Yokaichi)

Technical
- Line length: 47.7 kilometres (29.6 mi)
- Track gauge: 1,067 mm (3 ft 6 in)
- Electrification: 1,500 V DC

The Ohmi Railway Main Line (近江鉄道本線, Ōmi Tetsudō hon-sen) is a regional railway line in Shiga Prefecture operated by the private railway operator Ohmi Railway. It connects the cities of Maibara and Koka. Its alignment is parallel with the Tōkaidō Shinkansen between Takamiya and Gokasho.

The line is 47.7 kilometres (29.6 mi) long, extending from Maibara to Kibukawa. The line connects with the JR Central Tōkaidō Main Line and Tōkaidō Shinkansen, and the JR West Hokuriku Main Line and Biwako Line at Maibara, and the JR West Kusatsu Line and the Shigaraki Kōgen Railway Shigaraki Line at Kibukawa.

== History ==
The Hikone to Yokaichi section opened in 1898, reaching Kibukawa in 1900. The Hikone to Takamiya section was electrified at 600 V DC in 1925, with the Takamiya to Kibukawa section electrified at 1,500 V DC in 1928, and the Hikone to Takamiya section raised to that voltage at the same time. The Hikone to Maibara section opened in 1931 following the construction of the 340 m Sawayama Tunnel, electrified from opening.

Transport of postal items ceased in 1984, and freight services ceased in 1988.

Rapid train services were introduced in 2003, but were discontinued in 2013.

=== Timeline ===
- 11 June 1898: Line opened between Hikone and Echigawa via Takamiya.
- 24 July 1898: Line opened between Echigawa and Yokaichi.
- 19 March 1899: Toyosato and Obata Stations opened.
- 1 October 1900: Line opened between Yokaichi and Hino via Sakuragawa.
- 28 December 1900: Line opened between Hino and Kibukawa via Minakuchi. Asahino station opened.
- 20 May 1901: Shinmachi Station opened.
- 1 January 1910: Obata Station renamed Gokasho Station.
- 1 June 1911: Amago Station opened.
- 16 October 1916: Asahi Otsuka Station opened.
- 27 December 1916: Nagatanino Station opened.
- 1 January 1917: Shinmachi Station renamed Hikoneguchi Station.
- 12 March 1925: Line was electrified between Hikone and Takamiya.
- 18 April 1928: Line was electrified between Takamiya and Kibukawa.
- 15 March 1931: Electrified line opened between Hikone and Maibara via Toriimoto.
- 1 August 1957: Minakuchi Ishibashi Station opened.
- 1 May 1987: Driver-only operation commenced.
- 5 April 1989: Minakuchi Matsuo and Minakuchi Jonan Stations opened.
- 29 March 1990: Daigaku-mae Station opened.
- 16 March 1991: Kyocera-mae Station opened.
- 13 March 2004: Kawabe-no-mori Station opened.
- 18 March 2006: Fujitec-mae Station opened.
- 8 April 2009: Hikone-Serikawa Station opened.

== Stations ==
Local trains stop at all stations.

No.	Station	Japanese	Distance (km)	Connections	Location	
OR-01	Maibara	米原	0.0	Tōkaidō Shinkansen; Tōkaidō Main Line; Biwako Line; Hokuriku Main Line	Maibara	Shiga Prefecture
OR-02	Fujitec-mae	フジテック前	2.3		Hikone	Shiga Prefecture
OR-03	Toriimoto	鳥居本	3.4		Hikone	Shiga Prefecture
OR-04	Hikone	彦根	5.8	Tōkaidō Main Line (Biwako Line)	Hikone	Shiga Prefecture
OR-05	Hikone-Serikawa	ひこね芹川	7.0		Hikone	Shiga Prefecture
OR-06	Hikoneguchi	彦根口	7.8		Hikone	Shiga Prefecture
OR-07	Takamiya	高宮	9.9	Ohmi Railway Taga Line	Hikone	Shiga Prefecture
OR-10	Amago	尼子	12.7		Kōra	Shiga Prefecture
OR-11	Toyosato	豊郷	15.0		Toyosato	Shiga Prefecture
OR-12	Echigawa	愛知川	17.9		Aishō	Shiga Prefecture
OR-13	Gokashō	五箇荘	20.9		Higashiōmi	Shiga Prefecture
OR-14	Kawabe-no-mori	河辺の森	23.0		Higashiōmi	Shiga Prefecture
OR-15	Yōkaichi	八日市	25.3	Ohmi Railway Yōkaichi Line	Higashiōmi	Shiga Prefecture
OR-26	Nagatanino	長谷野	27.5		Higashiōmi	Shiga Prefecture
OR-27	Daigaku-mae	大学前	28.4		Higashiōmi	Shiga Prefecture
OR-28	Kyocera-mae	京セラ前	29.9		Higashiōmi	Shiga Prefecture
OR-29	Sakuragawa	桜川	31.2		Higashiōmi	Shiga Prefecture
OR-30	Asahi Ōtsuka	朝日大塚	32.8		Higashiōmi	Shiga Prefecture
OR-31	Asahino	朝日野	35.2		Higashiōmi	Shiga Prefecture
OR-32	Hino	日野	37.8		Hino	Shiga Prefecture
OR-33	Minakuchi Matsuo	水口松尾	42.7		Kōka	Shiga Prefecture
OR-34	Minakuchi	水口	43.8		Kōka	Shiga Prefecture
OR-35	Minakuchi Ishibashi	水口石橋	44.4		Kōka	Shiga Prefecture
OR-36	Minakuchi Jōnan	水口城南	45.1		Kōka	Shiga Prefecture
OR-37	Kibukawa	貴生川	47.7	Kusatsu Line; Shigaraki Kōgen Railway Shigaraki Line	Kōka	Shiga Prefecture

== See also ==
- List of railway lines in Japan
