= Asahi Ōtsuka Station =

Railway station in Higashiōmi, Shiga Prefecture, Japan

Asahi Ōtsuka Station 朝日大塚駅
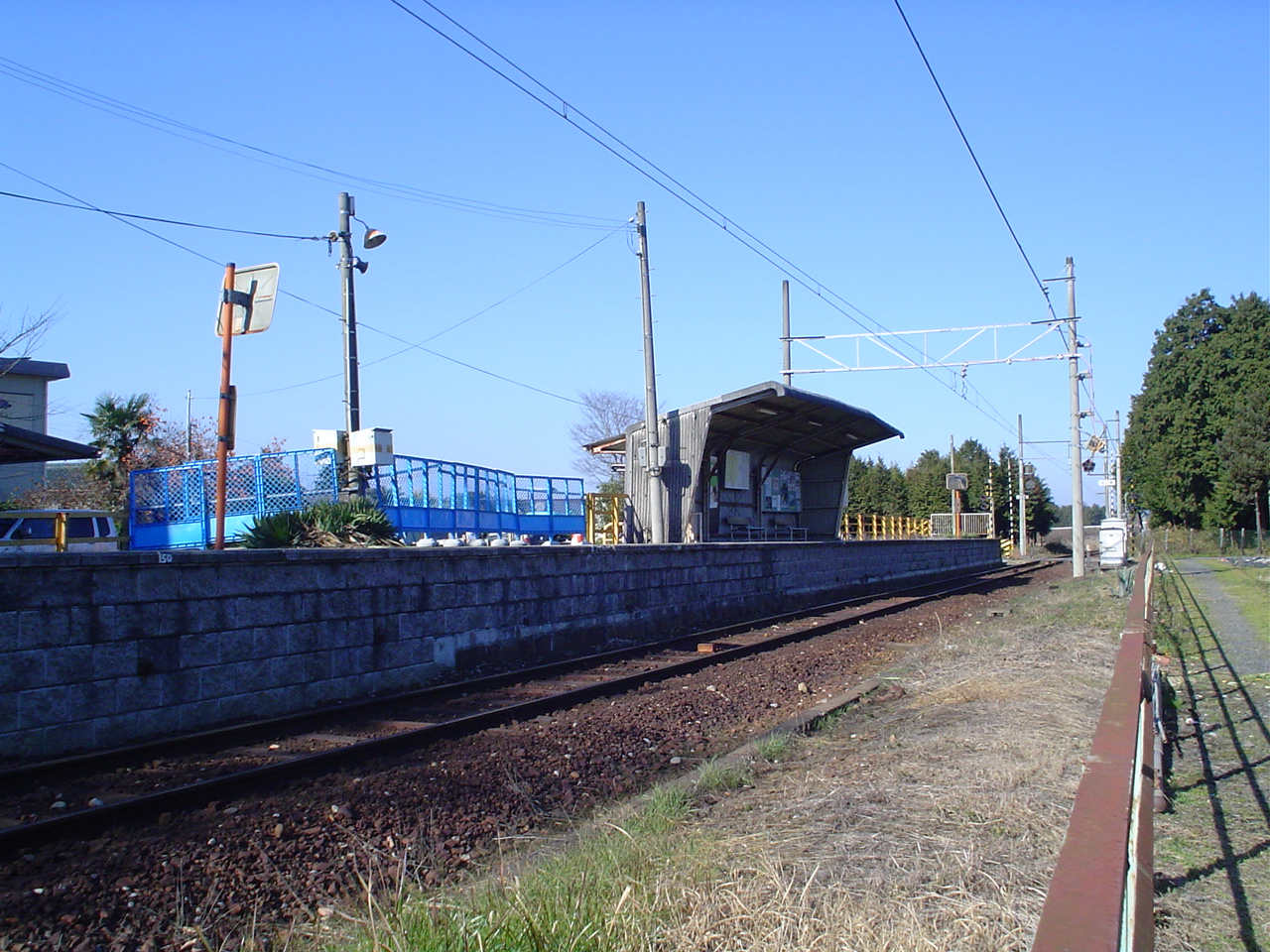
- Asahi Ōtsuka Station, December 2008

General information
- Location: 315-3 Ōtsuka-chō, Higashiōmi-shi, Shiga-ken 529-1512; Japan
- Coordinates: 35.0508°N 136.1938°E
- Operator: Ohmi Railway
- Line: ■ Ohmi Railway Main Line
- Distance: 32.8 km from Maibara
- Platforms: 2 side platforms

Other information
- Station code: OR30
- Website: Official website

History
- Opened: October 16, 1916

Passengers
- FY2019: 84 daily
Location
- Location within Shiga Prefecture Location within Japan

Asahi Ōtsuka Station (朝日大塚駅, Asahi Ōtsuka-eki) is a passenger railway station in located in the city of Higashiōmi, Shiga Prefecture, Japan, operated by the private railway operator Ohmi Railway.

== Lines ==
Asahi Ōtsuka Station is served by the Ohmi Railway Main Line, and is located 32.8 rail kilometers from the terminus of the line at Maibara Station.

== Station layout ==
The station consists of one side platform serving a single bi-directional track. There is no station building, but only a shelter on the platform itself. The station is unattended.

== Platforms ==
■ Main Line	for Hikone and Maibara for Yokaichi, Kibukawa and Omi-Hachiman

== Adjacent stations ==
«	Service	»
Ohmi Railway Main Line
Rapid: Does not stop at this station
Sakuragawa	Local	Asahino

== History ==
Asahi Ōtsuka Station was opened on October 16, 1916

== Passenger statistics ==
In fiscal 2019, the station was used by an average of 72 passengers daily (boarding passengers only).

== Surroundings ==
- Myogan-ji
- Hachiman Jinja

== See also ==
- List of railway stations in Japan
