= Nisshōji Domain =

Nisshōji Domain 仁正寺藩
- Domain of Japan
- 1620–1871
- Capital: Nisshōji jin'ya
- Area
  - Coordinates: 35°00′30.8″N 136°15′58″E
  - Type: Daimyō
- Historical era: Edo period
  - Established: 1620
  - Disestablished: 1871
- Today part of: part of Shiga Prefecture

Nisshōji jin'ya

Nisshōji Domain (仁正寺藩, Nisshōji-han) was a Fudai feudal domain under the Tokugawa shogunate of Edo period Japan. It was located in southeastern Ōmi Province, in the Kansai region of central Honshu. The domain was centered at Nisshōji jin'ya, located in what is now the town of Hino in Shiga Prefecture.

== History ==
Hino was the location of Nakano Castle, a stronghold of Gamō Ujisato during the Sengoku period. The castle was abandoned after the Battle of Sekigahara. In 1620, Ichihashi Nagamasa, a former retainer of Oda Nobunaga who had entered into the service of Tokugawa Ieyasu and who had distinguished himself at the Siege of Osaka, was established as daimyō of the newly created Nisshōji Domain with a kokudaka of 20,000 koku. He built a jin'ya on the ruins of the old Nakano Castle. In 1622, he gave 2000 koku to his younger son, Ichihashi Nagayoshi, to establish a cadet branch of the clan, reducing the domain to 18,000 koku. His son, the second daimyō Ishibashi Masanobu likewise awarded 1000 koku to his son, Ishihashi Masanao, reducing the domain further to 17,000 koku.

During the Bakumatsu period, the 10th daimyō, Ishibashi Nagakazu, was a supporter of the Shogunate and attempted to manufacture gunpowder in the domain. In 1862, he also officially changed to name of the domain from Nisshōji Domain (仁正寺藩, Nisshōji-han) to Nishiōji Domain (西大路, Nishiōji-han) . However, with the start of the Boshin War, he changed his fealty to the imperial cause and served in the guard for Emperor Meiji. As with all domains, Nishiōji Domain was abolished in 1870 with the abolition of the han system. It subsequently was incorporated into Nishiōji prefecture, Ōtsu Prefecture, and then Shiga Prefecture.

Most of the remains of Nisshōji jin'ya were destroyed by the construction of Hinogawa Dam, but some remnants of stone walls and moats of the main enclosure survive near the Ryohashi Jinja and Inari Jinja. The main building of the jin'ya itself was used the Nisshōji Elementary School in the Meiji period. In 1918, it was dismantled and sold to Shōkoku-ji in Kyoto and rebuilt for use at its sub-temple Rinko-in.

== Bakumatsu period holdings ==
As with most domains in the han system, Nisshōji Domain consisted of a discontinuous territories calculated to provide the assigned kokudaka, based on periodic cadastral surveys and projected agricultural yields.

- Ōmi Province
  - 3 villages in Yasu District
  - 27 villages in Gamō District

== List of daimyō ==
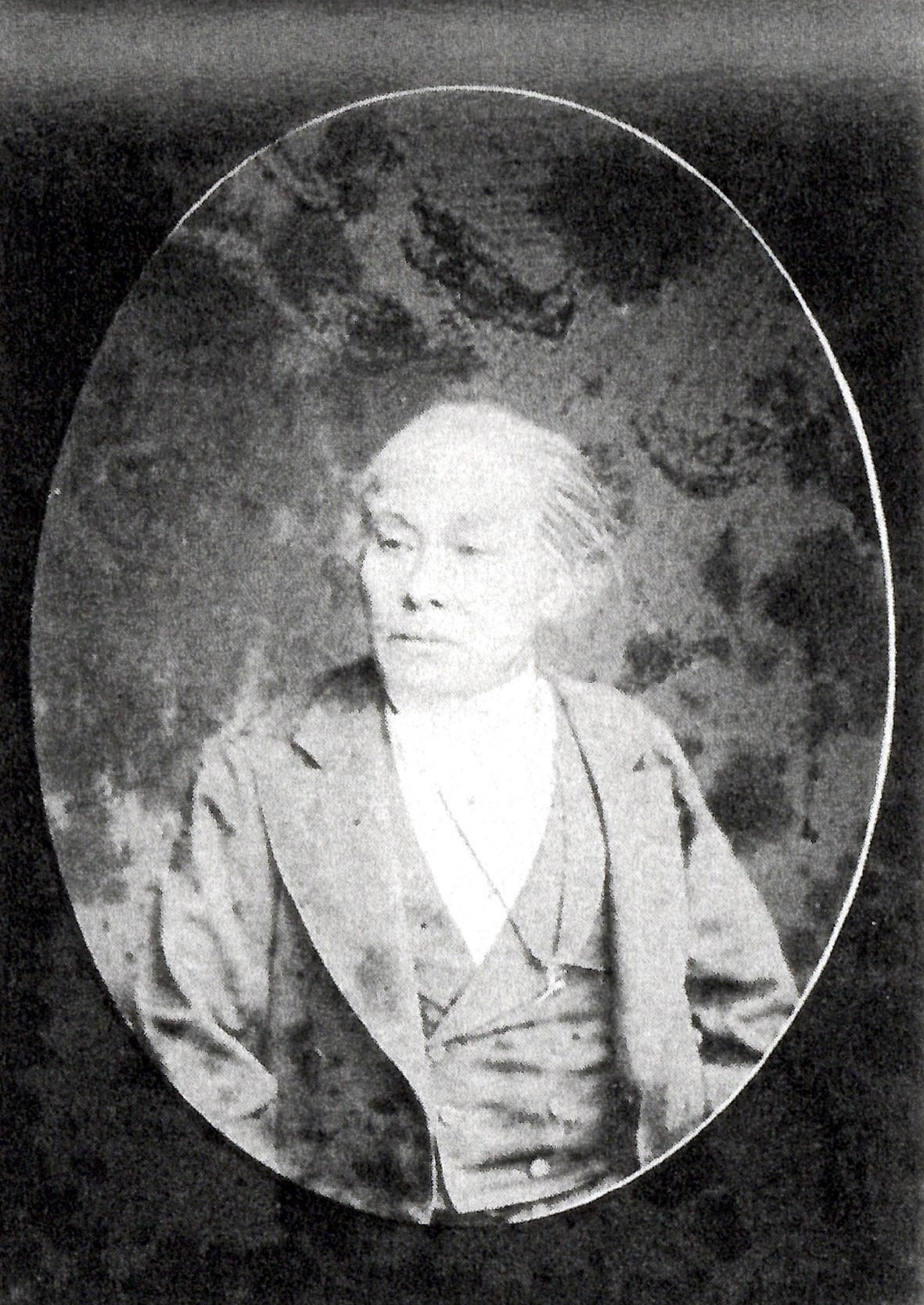
Ichihashi Nagakazu, final daimyō of Nishiōji

- Ichihashi clan (Tozama) 1620-1871

	Name	Tenure	Courtesy title	Court Rank	kokudaka
1	Ichihashi Nagamasa (市橋長政)	1620–1648	Izu-no-kami (伊豆守)	Junior 5th Rank, Lower Grade (従五位下)	20,000 -> 18,000 koku
2	Ichihashi Masanobu (市橋政信)	1648–1704	Shimōsa-no-kami (下総守)	Junior 5th Rank, Lower Grade (従五位下)	18,000 -> 17,000 koku
3	Ichihashi Masanao (市橋信直)	1704–1720	Shimōsa-no-kami (下総守)	Junior 5th Rank, Lower Grade (従五位下)	17,000 koku
4	Ichihashi Naokata (市橋直方)	1720–1736	Iki-no-kami (壱岐守。)	Junior 5th Rank, Lower Grade (従五位下)	17,000 koku
5	Ichihashi Naotaka (市橋直挙)	1736–1758	Shimōsa-no-kami (下総守)	Junior 5th Rank, Lower Grade (従五位下)	17,000 koku
6	Ichihashi Nagateru (市橋長璉)	1758–1785	Izu-no-kami (伊豆守)	Junior 5th Rank, Lower Grade (従五位下)	17,000 koku
7	Ichihashi Nagaaki (市橋長昭)	1785–1814	Shimōsa-no-kami (下総守)	Junior 5th Rank, Lower Grade (従五位下)	17,000 koku
8	Ichihashi Nagaharu (市橋長発)	1814–1822	Izu-no-kami (伊豆守)	Junior 5th Rank, Lower Grade (従五位下)	17,000 koku
9	Ichihashi Nagatomi (市橋長富)	1822–1844	Tonomo-no-kami (主殿頭)	Junior 5th Rank, Lower Grade (従五位下)	17,000 koku
10	Ichihashi Nagakazu (市橋長和)	1844–1871	Iki-no-kami (壱岐守)	Third Rank (正四位)	17,000 koku

== See also ==
- List of Han
