= Kyocera-mae Station =

Railway station in Higashiōmi, Shiga Prefecture, Japan

Kyocera-mae Station 京セラ前駅
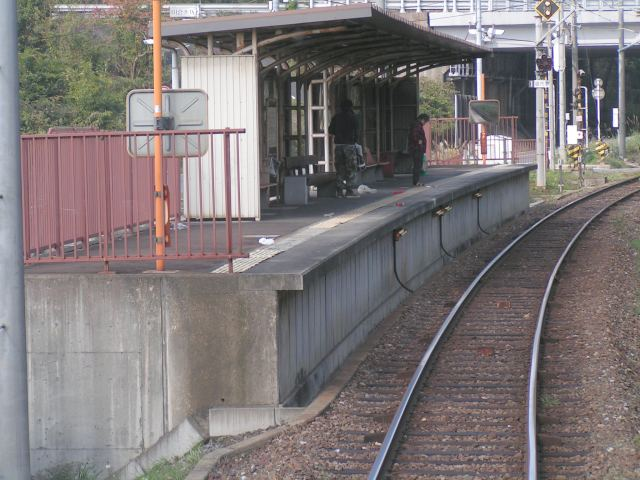
- Kyocera-mae Station, 2005

General information
- Location: 13-16 Kawai-chō, Higashiōmi-shi, Shiga-ken 529-1571; Japan
- Coordinates: 35.0749°N 136.1805°E
- Operator: Ohmi Railway
- Line: ■ Ohmi Railway Main Line
- Distance: 29.9 km from Maibara
- Platforms: 1 side platform

Other information
- Station code: OR28
- Website: Official website

History
- Opened: March 16, 1991

Passengers
- FY2019: 57 daily
Location
- Location within Shiga Prefecture Location within Japan

Kyocera-mae Station (京セラ前駅, Kyōsera-mae-eki) is a passenger railway station in located in the city of Higashiōmi, Shiga Prefecture, Japan, operated by the private railway operator Ohmi Railway. The station was opened for the Kyocera Shiga Gamo Factory located a short walk away.

== Lines ==
Kyocera-mae Station is served by the Ohmi Railway Main Line, and is located 29.9 rail kilometers from the terminus of the line at Maibara Station.

== Station layout ==
The station consists of one side platform serving a single bi-directional track. There is no station building, but only a shelter on the platform. The station is unattended.

== Platforms ==
■ Main Line	for Hikone and Maibara for Yokaichi, Kibukawa and Omi-Hachiman

== Adjacent stations ==
«	Service	»
Ohmi Railway Main Line
Rapid: Does not stop at this station
Daigaku-mae	Local	Sakuragawa

== History ==
Kyocera-mae Station was opened on March 16, 1991.

== Passenger statistics ==
In fiscal 2019, the station was used by an average of 57 passengers daily (boarding passengers only).

== Surroundings ==
- Kyocera Shiga Gamo Factory

== See also ==
- List of railway stations in Japan
