= Minakuchi Station =

Railway station in Kōka, Shiga Prefecture, Japan

Minakuchi Station 水口駅
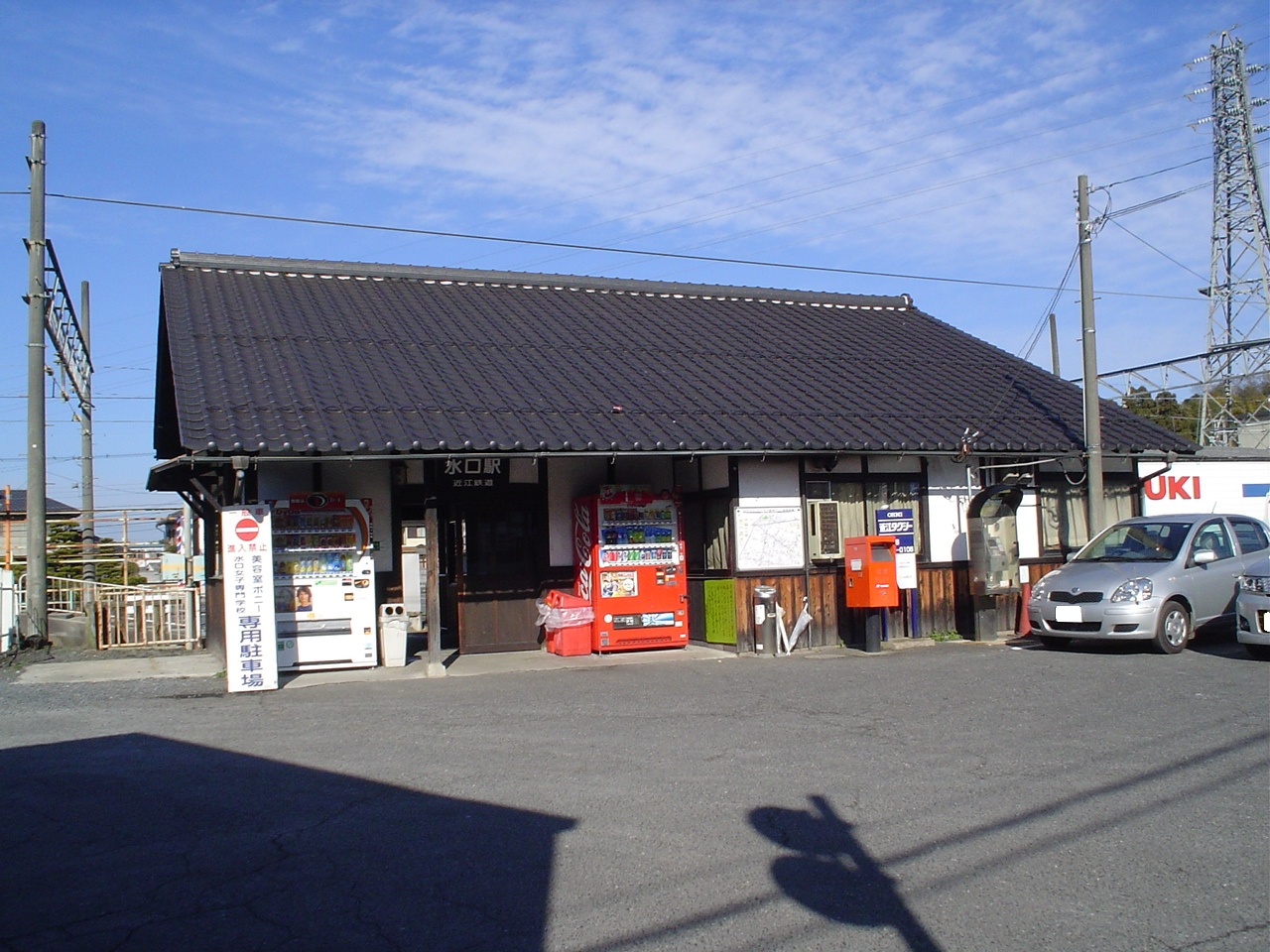
- Minakuchi Station, December 2008

General information
- Location: 1-5 Minakuchichō Shinmachi, Kōka-shi, Shiga-ken 528-0038; Japan
- Coordinates: 34.9747°N 136.1777°E
- Operator: Ohmi Railway
- Line: ■ Ohmi Railway Main Line
- Distance: 43.8 km from Maibara
- Platforms: 2 side platforms

Other information
- Station code: OR34
- Website: Official website

History
- Opened: December 28, 1900

Passengers
- FY2018: 348 daily
Location
- Location within Shiga Prefecture Location within Japan

Minakuchi Station (水口駅, Minakuchi Matsuo-eki) is a passenger railway station in located in the city of Kōka, Shiga Prefecture, Japan, operated by the private railway operator Ohmi Railway.

== Lines ==
Minakuchi Station is served by the Ohmi Railway Main Line, and is located 43.8 rail kilometers from the terminus of the line at Maibara Station.

== Station layout ==
The station consists of two unnumbered opposed side platforms connect to the station building by a level crossing. The station is unattended.

== Platforms ==
■ Main Line	for Hikone and Maibara
■ Main Line	for Yokaichi, Kibukawa and Omi-Hachiman

== Adjacent stations ==
«	Service	»
Ohmi Railway Main Line
Hino	Rapid	Minakuchi Ishibashi
Minakuchi Matsuo	Local	Minakuchi Ishibashi

== History ==
Minakuchi Station was opened on December 28, 1900

== Passenger statistics ==
In fiscal 2018, the station was used by an average of 348 passengers daily.

== Surroundings ==
- Japan National Route 1
- Japan National Route 307
- Shiga Prefectural Mizuguchi Higashi Junior and Senior High School
- Koka City Shiroyama Junior High School

== See also ==
- List of railway stations in Japan
