= Minakuchi Matsuo Station =

Railway station in Kōka, Shiga Prefecture, Japan

Minakuchi Matsuo Station 水口松尾駅
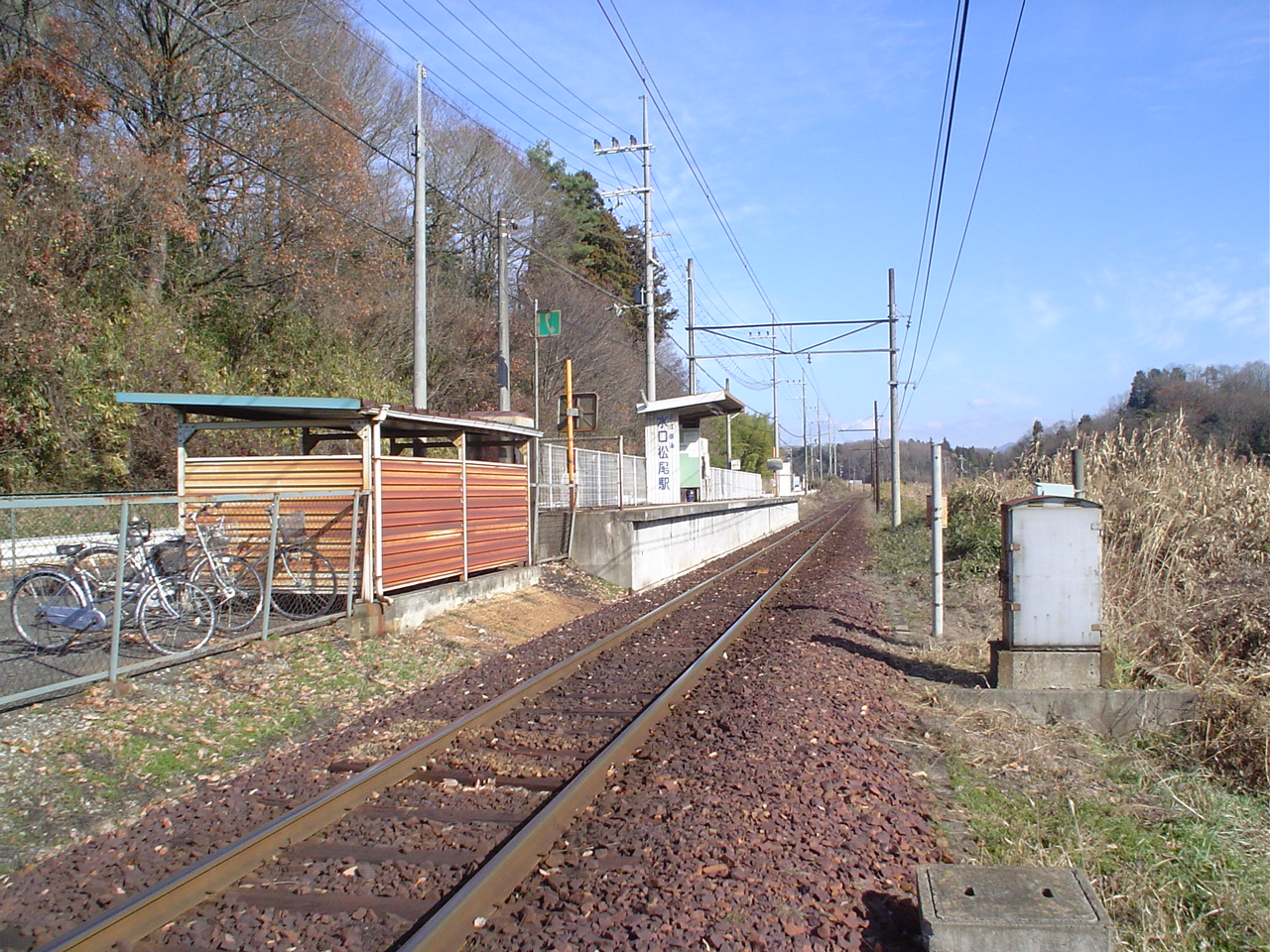
- Minakuchi Matsuo Station, December 2008

General information
- Location: Minakuchichō Minakuchi, Kōka-shi, Shiga-ken 528-0005; Japan
- Coordinates: 34.9802°N 136.1865°E
- Operator: Ohmi Railway
- Line: ■ Ohmi Railway Main Line
- Distance: 42.7 km from Maibara
- Platforms: 1 side platform

Other information
- Station code: OR33
- Website: Official website

History
- Opened: April 5, 1989.

Passengers
- FY2018: 63 daily
Location
- Location within Shiga Prefecture Location within Japan

Minakuchi Matsuo Station (水口松尾駅, Minakuchi Matsuo-eki) is a passenger railway station in located in the city of Kōka, Shiga Prefecture, Japan, operated by the private railway operator Ohmi Railway.

== Lines ==
Minakuchi Matsuo Station is served by the Ohmi Railway Main Line, and is located 42.7 rail kilometers from the terminus of the line at Maibara Station.

== Station layout ==
The station consists of one side platform serving a single bi-directional track. There is no station building, but only a shelter on the platform. The station is unattended.

== Platforms ==
■ Main Line	for Hikone and Maibara for Yokaichi, Kibukawa and Omi-Hachiman

== Adjacent stations ==
«	Service	»
Ohmi Railway Main Line
Rapid: Does not stop at this station
Hino	Local	Minakuchi

== History ==
Minakuchi Matsuo Station was opened on April 5, 1989.

== Passenger statistics ==
In fiscal 2018, the station was used by an average of 63 passengers daily.

== Surroundings ==
- Japan National Route 1
- Japan National Route 307

== See also ==
- List of railway stations in Japan
