= Nagatanino Station =

Railway station in Higashiōmi, Shiga Prefecture, Japan

Nagatanino Station 長谷野駅
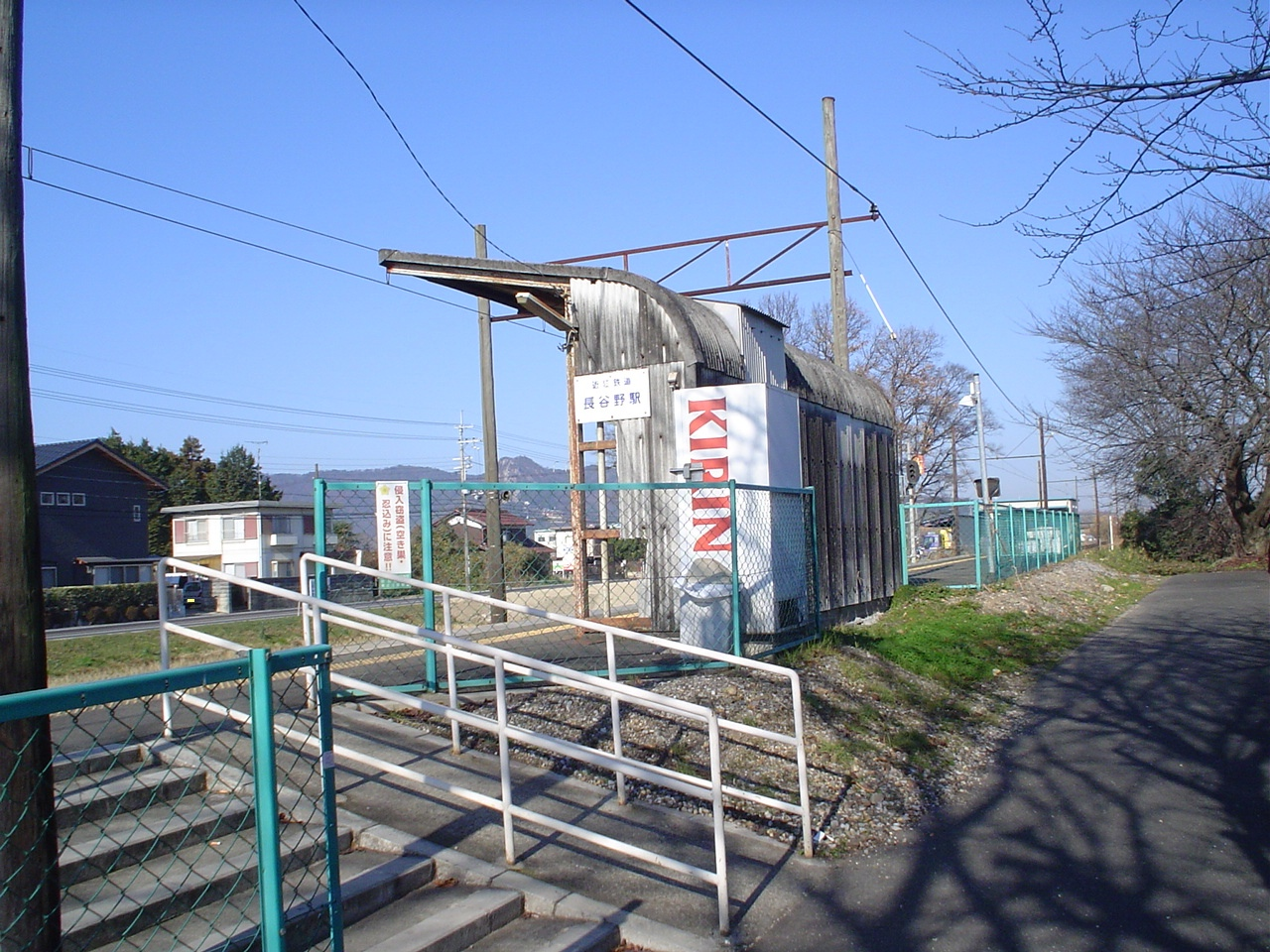
- Nagatanino Station, December 2008

General information
- Location: 913-2 Imaborichō, Higashiōmi, Shiga 527-0071; Japan
- Coordinates: 35.0958°N 136.1873°E
- Operator: Ohmi Railway
- Line: ■ Ohmi Railway Main Line
- Distance: 27.5 km from Maibara
- Platforms: 1 side platform

Other information
- Station code: OR26
- Website: Official website

History
- Opened: March 19, 1899

Passengers
- FY2019: 80 daily
Location
- Location within Shiga Prefecture Location within Japan

Nagatanino Station (長谷野駅, Nagatanino-eki) is a passenger railway station in located in the city of Higashiōmi, Shiga Prefecture, Japan, operated by the private railway operator Ohmi Railway.

== Lines ==
Nagatanino Station is served by the Ohmi Railway Main Line, and is located 27.5 rail kilometers from the terminus of the line at Maibara Station.

== Station layout ==
The station consists of a single side platform serving one bi-directional track. There is no station building, but only a rain shelter on the platform itself. The station is unattended.

== Platforms ==
■ Main Line	for Hikone and Maibara for Yokaichi, Kibukawa and Omi-Hachiman

== Adjacent stations ==
«	Service	»
Ohmi Railway Main Line
Rapid: Does not stop at this station
Yōkaichi	Local	Daigaku-mae

== History ==
Nagatanino Station was opened on December 27, 1916.

== Passenger statistics ==
In fiscal 2019, the station was used by an average of 80 passengers daily (boarding passengers only).

== Surroundings ==
- Imabori Hiyoshi Shrine
- Nagao Shrine

== See also ==
- List of railway stations in Japan
