= Ichihashi Nagakazu =

Last Daimyō of the Nisshōji domain

- 市橋長和
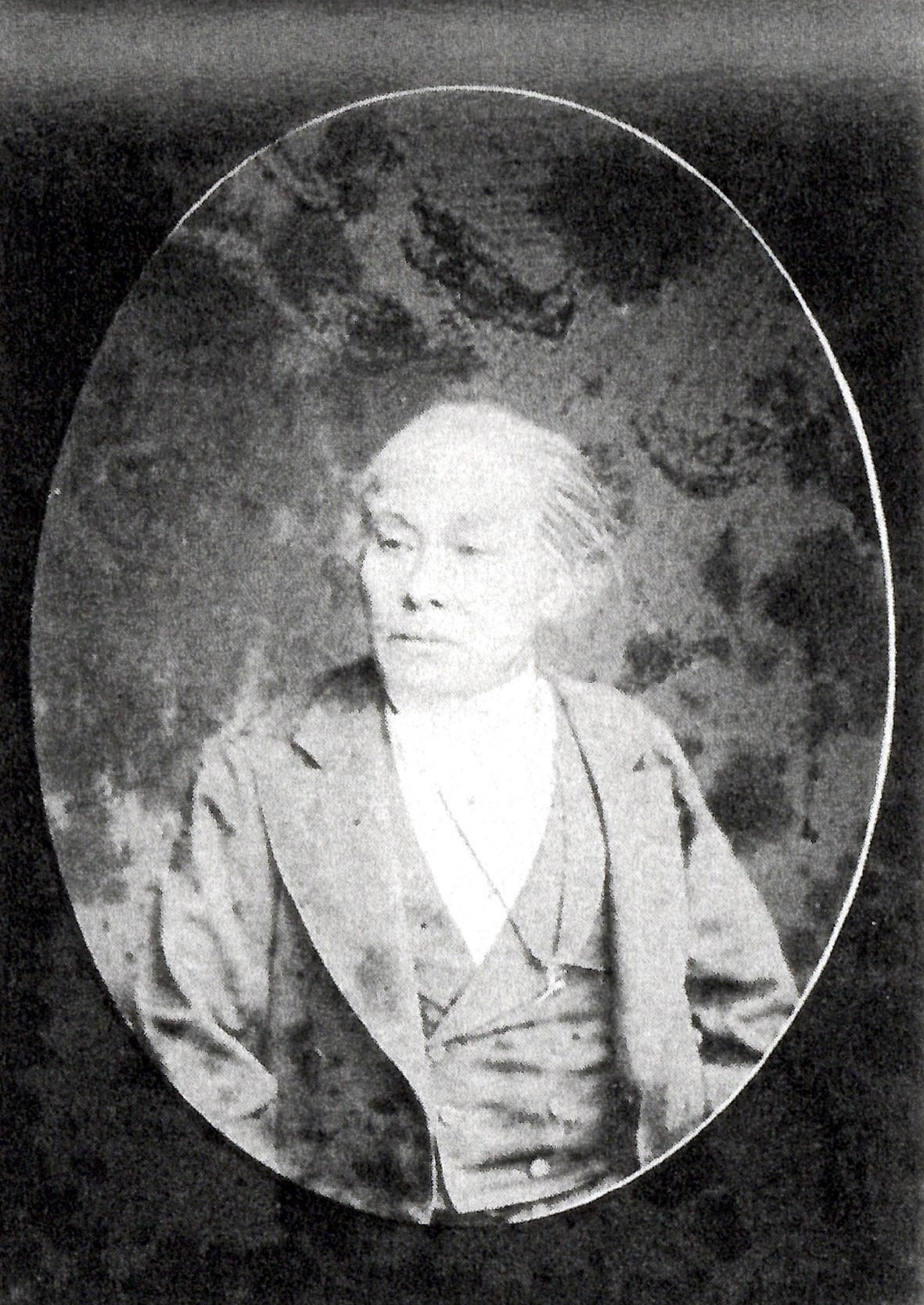
- Ichihashi Nagakazu, post-Meiji restoration

10th Daimyō of Nisshōji Domain
- In office 1844–1868
- Monarchs: Shōgun: Tokugawa Ieyoshi; Tokugawa Iesada; Tokugawa Iemochi; Tokugawa Yoshinobu
- Preceded by: Ichihashi Nagatomi
- Succeeded by: < position abolished >

Imperial Governor of Nishiōji
- In office 1869–1871
- Monarch: Emperor Meiji

Personal details
- Born: July 21, 1821
- Died: January 17, 1882 (aged 60)
- Parent: Sakai Tadakata (father)

Ichihashi Nagakazu (市橋長和, June 7, 1821 – January 17, 1882) was the 10th (and final) daimyō of Nisshōji Domain in Bakumatsu period Japan and was the 11th hereditary chieftain of the Ichihashi clan. Before the Meiji Restoration, his courtesy title was Oki-no-kami, and his Court rank was Senior Fourth Rank.

== Biography ==
Ichihashi Nagakazu was the fourth son of Sakai Tadakata, daimyō of Shōnai Domain in northern Japan. He was adopted as heir to Ichihashi Nagatomi of Nisshōji Domain in 1843 and was received in formal audience by Shogun Tokugawa Iemochi in the following year. Ichihashi Nagatomi retired a few weeks afterwards, and he became daimyō, initially with the courtesy title of Shimōsa-no-kami. Following the Perry Expedition in 1853, the country was plunged into turmoil, and foreseeing the high probability of conflict in the near future, he turned the domain's resources into the production of gunpowder. In 1862, he formally changed the domain's name from Nisshiōji Domain to Nishiōji Domain (西大路藩). In December 1867, he pledged fealty to the new Meiji government and was ordered to seize control of the territories in Ōmi Province belonging to Kawagoe Domain, which had remained loyal to the Tokugawa. He later requested to be excepted from further military service due to the small size of his army, but the request was denied. In 1868, he was assigned to the guard of Emperor Meiji when the emperor transferred his seat from Kyoto to Edo, now newly re-named Tokyo. In 1869 he became imperial governor of Nishiōji until the abolition of the han system in 1871. He relocated to Tokyo, where he resided until his death in 1882. His grave is at the clan bodaiji of Nansen-ji in Nishinipppori in Arakawa, Tokyo.
