= Hino, Shiga =

Hino 日野町
- Town
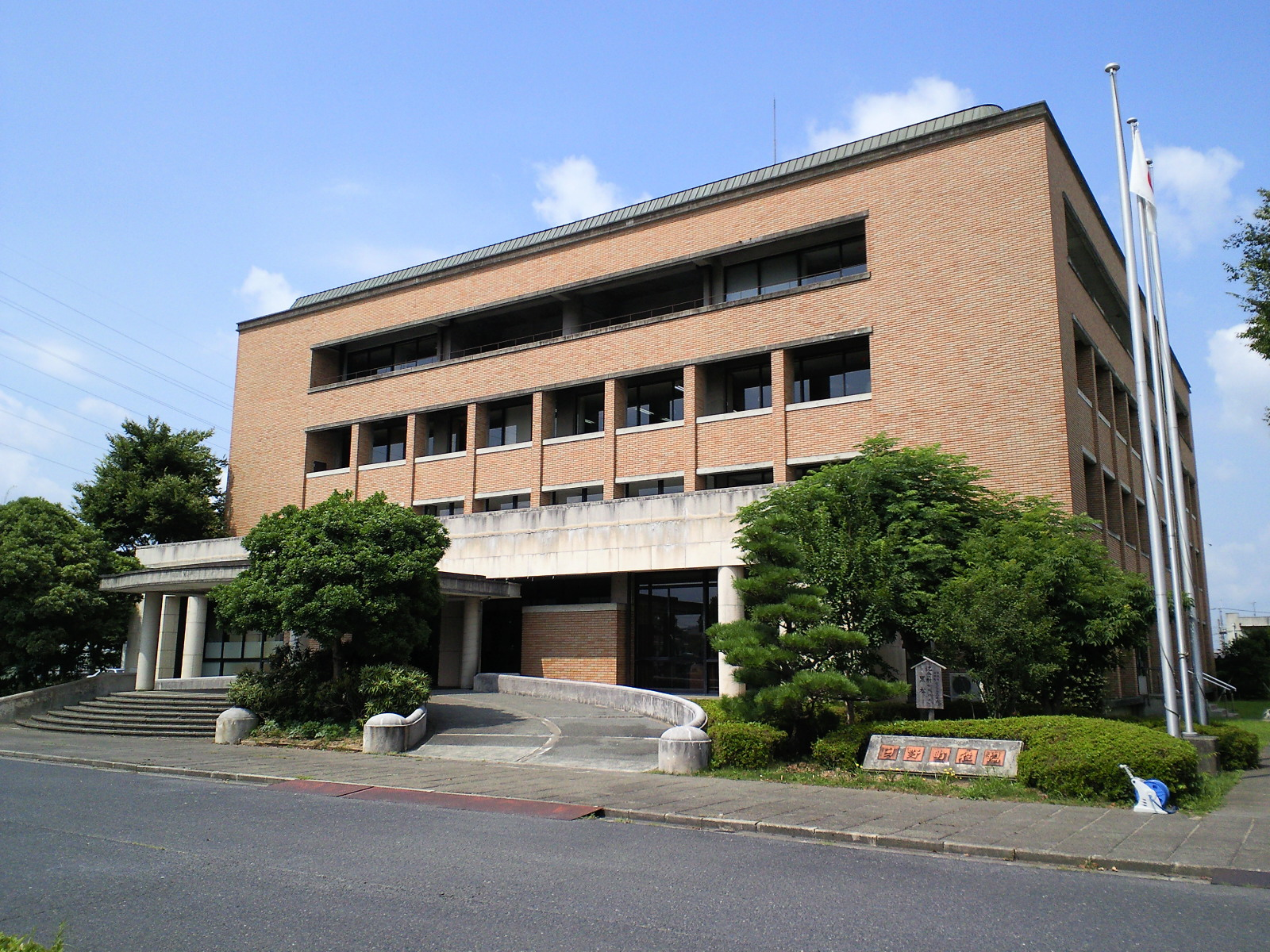
- Hino Town Office

- Flag Emblem

- Location of Hino in Shiga Prefecture

- Location in Japan
- Coordinates: 35°1′N 136°15′E
- Country: Japan
- Region: Kansai
- Prefecture: Shiga Prefecture
- District: Gamō

Area
  - Total: 117.60 km^{2} (45.41 sq mi)

Population (September 1, 2021)
  - Total: 21,149
  - Density: 179.84/km^{2} (465.78/sq mi)
- Time zone: UTC+09:00 (JST)
- City hall address: 1-1 Kawara, Hino-cho, Gamou-gun, Shiga-ken; 529-1698
- Phone number: 0748-52-1211
- Website: Official website
- Symbols
- Flower: Rhododendron
- Tree: Hinoki

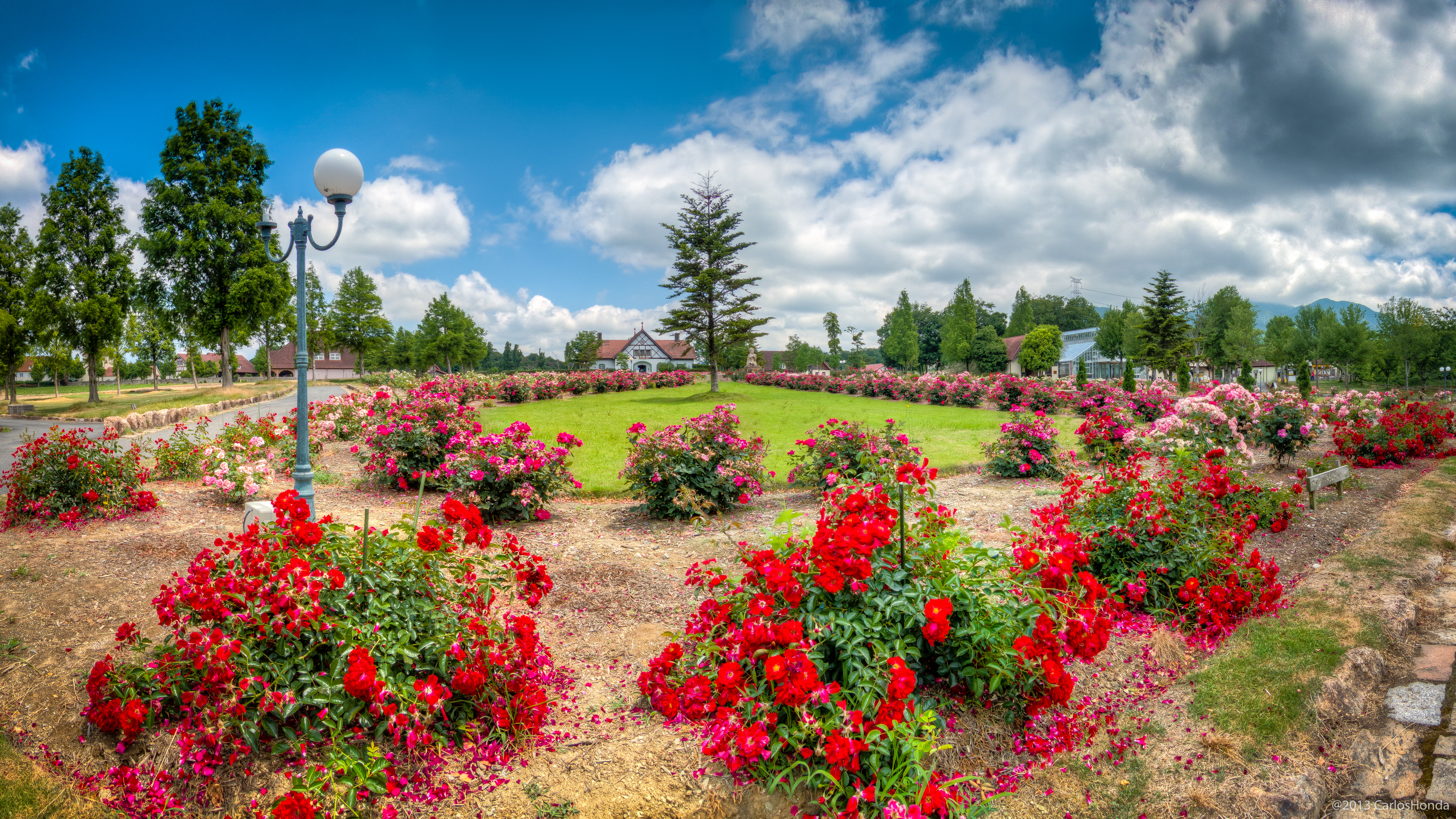
Blumen Hugel

Hino (日野町, Hino-chō) is a town located in Gamō District, Shiga Prefecture, Japan. As of 1 September 2021, the town had an estimated population of 21,149 in 8467 households and a population density of 180 persons per km^{2}. The total area of the town is 117.60 square kilometres (45.41 sq mi).

== Geography ==
Hino is located in east-central Shiga Prefecture in a large isolated rural area nestled beside the Suzuka Mountains with the town's tallest peak being Mt. Watamuki (1110m).

=== Surrounding municipalities ===
Shiga Prefecture

- Higashiōmi
- Kōka

=== Climate ===
Hino has a humid subtropical climate (Köppen Cfa) characterized by warm summers and cool winters with light to no snowfall. The average annual temperature in Hino is 13.1 °C. The average annual rainfall is 1673 mm with September as the wettest month. The temperatures are highest on average in August, at around 24.9 °C, and lowest in January, at around 1.6 °C.

== Demographics ==
Per Japanese census data, the population of Hino has remained relatively steady over the past 60 years.

Historical population
Year	Pop.	±%
1920	21,601	—
1930	21,931	+1.5%
1940	21,059	−4.0%
1950	26,075	+23.8%
1960	22,992	−11.8%
1970	20,754	−9.7%
1980	21,680	+4.5%
1990	22,391	+3.3%
2000	23,022	+2.8%
2010	22,870	−0.7%
2020	20,964	−8.3%

== History ==
The area of Hino was part of ancient Ōmi Province. The name "Hino" appears in Heian period documents in connection with handicraft made from thin strips of wood called "Hinomono", which remain a local speciality. During the Muromachi period, the area was dominated by the Gamō clan who ruled from Hino Castle, and it was also the origin of many traveling merchants, known as "Ōmi shonin". During the Edo period, much of the town was part of the domain of Nisshōji Domain, a 20,000 koku holding under the Tokugawa shogunate. With the creation of the modern municipalities system on April 1, 1889, the town of Hino was established. Hino expanded by annexing the neighboring villages of Higashi-Sakuradani, Nishi-Sakuradani, Nishioji, Kaige, Minamihizusa, and Kitahizusa on March 16, 1955 .

== Government ==
Hino has a mayor-council form of government with a directly elected mayor and a unicameral city council of 14 members. Hino, together with the town of Ryūō contributes one member to the Shiga Prefectural Assembly. In terms of national politics, the town is part of Shiga 4th district of the lower house of the Diet of Japan.

== Economy ==
Agriculture has dominated the local economy since ancient times. Manufacturing includes a number of pharmaceutical factories, including Hino Pharmaceutical Company.

== Education ==
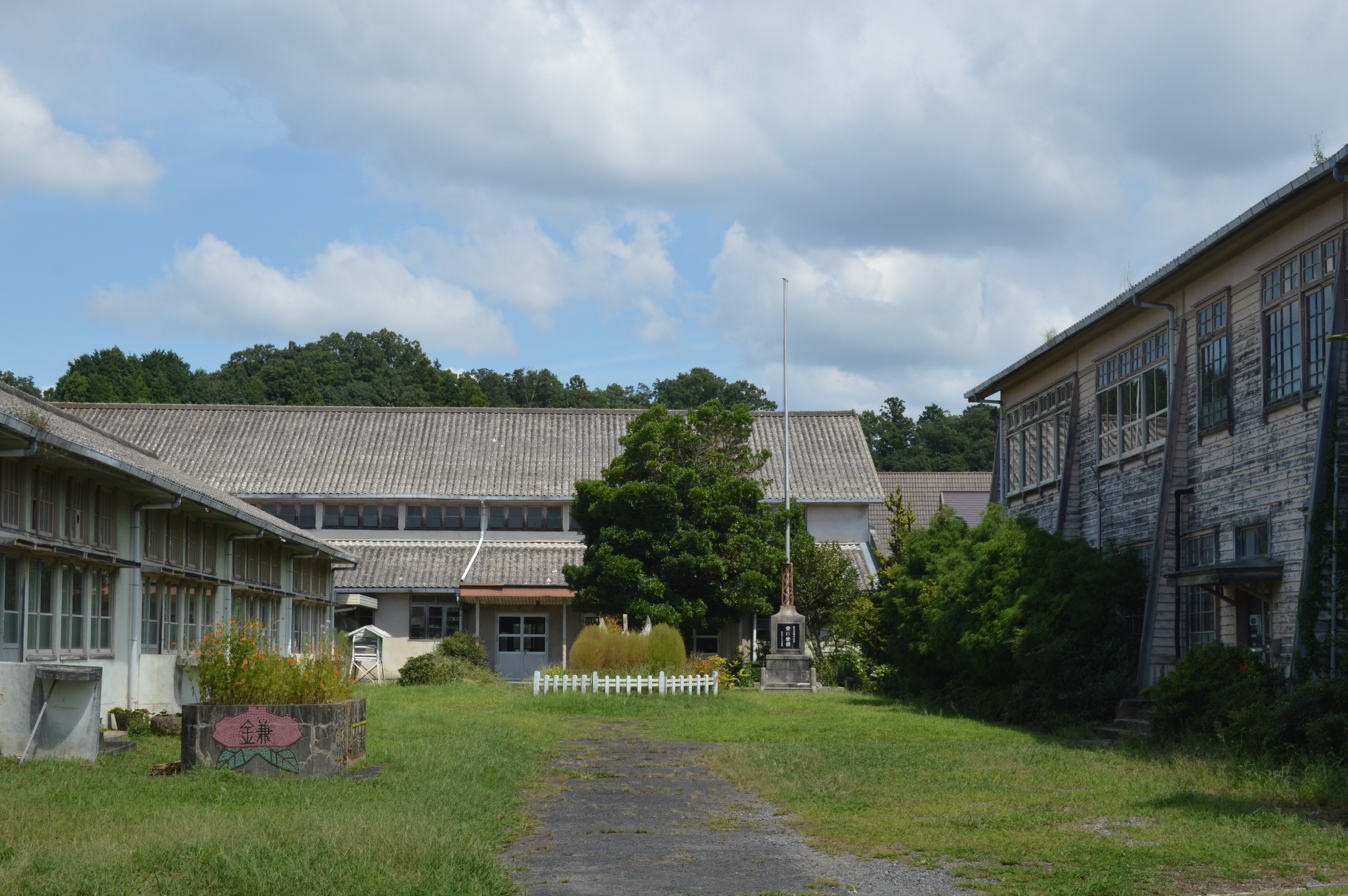
The old Kaikage Elementary School building.

Hino has six public elementary schools and one public middle school operated by the town government, and one public high school operated by the Shiga Prefectural Board of Education.

== Transportation ==
Rural Hino offers less options for public transportation than most areas in Shiga. The private Ohmi Railway company services the one and only train station in Hino, Hino Station, with trains running on average twice every hour, with slightly more frequency during common commuting times and with less during mid afternoon. However, the station was built roughly 3 km away from the town center. Bicycles can be rented near the station and can be taken on and off the Ohmi Train during certain times. The Ohmi Train offers a "Free Ticket" which allows a rider to get on and off anywhere along the train line for the whole day at one set price on weekends and holidays.

Ohmi Railway also runs buses which pick up and drop off at multiple points throughout Hino. The main bus connects Kitabata-guchi, Hino Station, and Ōmi-Hachiman Station as well as many rural points in between. The bus takes about 50 minutes from Hino to Ōmihachiman. Smaller inner-town buses also operate, but taking into consideration their infrequency, time and cost when compared to the overall size and points of interest of Hino, it is usually best to either walk, ride a bicycle or scooter, or drive a car if visiting multiple destinations.

=== Railway ===
Ohmi Railway – Main Line

- Hino

=== Highway ===
- National Route 307
- National Route 477

== Sister cities ==
- Buyeo County Eunsan, Chungcheongnam-do, South Korea
- Embu, São Paulo, Brazil
- Neustadt an der Aisch, Bavaria, Germany

== Local attractions ==
- Blumen Hugel (ブルーメの丘, Buruume no Oka) is a German themed agricultural park offering some German import foods such as beer and cheese. There are also opportunities for making foods such as sausage and bread. Animals such as cows and horses can be seen as well as a variety of flowers.
- Dahlia Garden (ダリア園, Daria-en) is a garden that displays thousands of Dahlia during summer and autumn and offers strawberry picking around March.
- Grimm Adventure Forest (グリム冒険の森, Gurimu Boken no Mori) is a themed campground based on Grimm's Fairy Tales. It offers cottage and tent camping. There are many extra activities for children such as baking with a stone oven and dying fabrics.
- Hino Castle Ruins (日野城跡, Hino-jo ato) are ruins of a castle that is said to have once been used as a place of refuge for Oda Nobunaga.
- Hino Festival (日野祭, Hino Matsuri) is Hino's largest festival, and one of Shiga's biggest, held on May 2 and 3 every year. Large traditional floats called "hikiyama" are pulled through town. Many people from around Shiga and other prefectures come to watch this historic event.
- The old Kaikage Elementary School (鎌掛小学校, Kaigake Shōgakkō) was decommissioned as a regular school in 2001 and has been used for various film and TV series. This school is a model for Icho Private High School in the 2012 anime series Love, Chunibyo & Other Delusions produced by Kyoto Animation.
- Omi Hino Merchant Museum (近江日野商人館, Omihino Shoninkan) is a museum dedicated to the history of the Hino Merchants.

== Notable people from Hino ==
- Miki Itō, freestyle skier
