= Sakuragawa Station (Shiga) =

Railway station in Higashiōmi, Shiga Prefecture, Japan

Sakuragawa Station 桜川駅
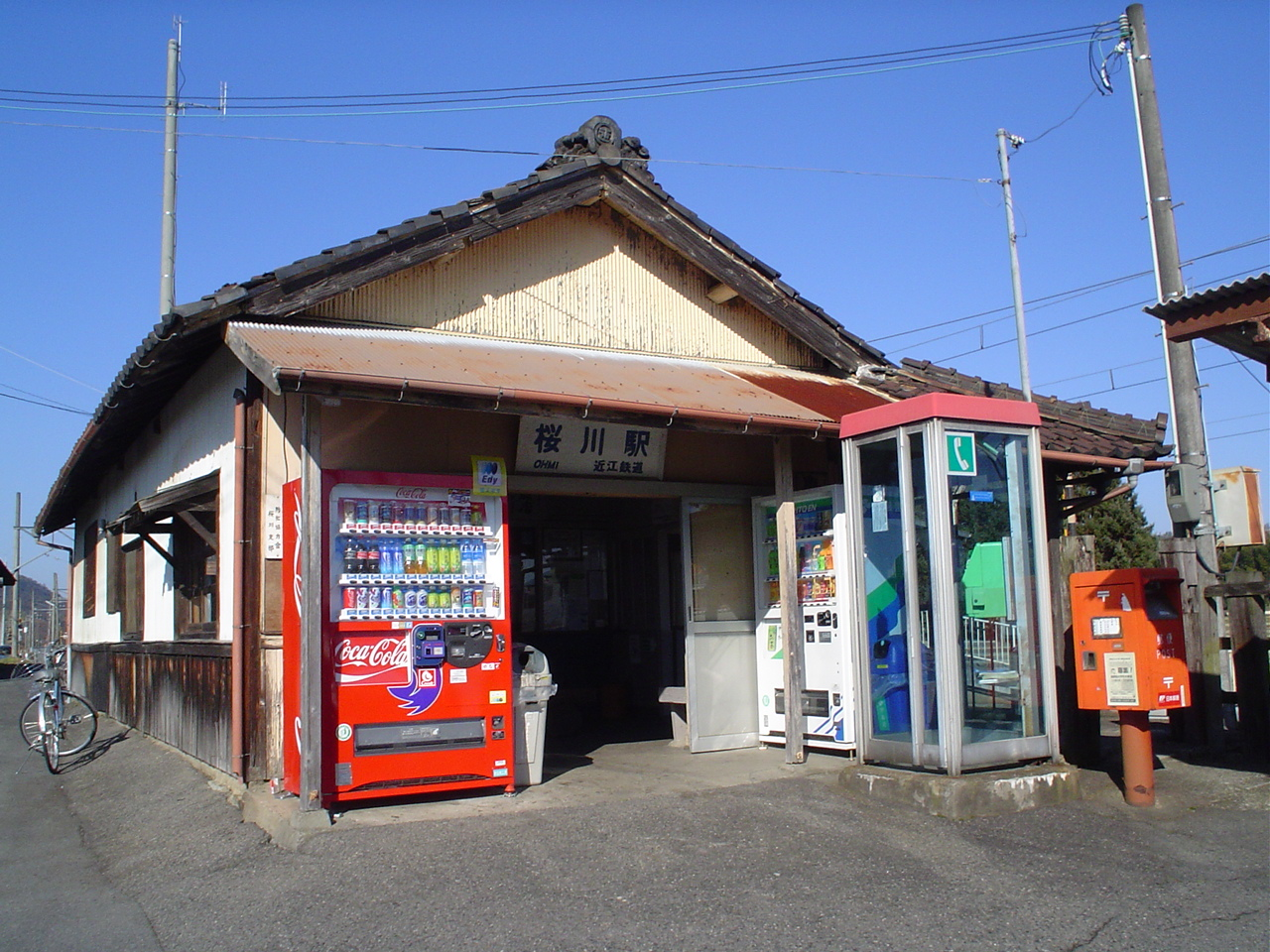
- Sakuragawa Station, December 2008

General information
- Location: 78 Sakuragawanishi-chō, Higashiōmi-shi, Shiga-ken 529-1572; Japan
- Coordinates: 35°03′53″N 136°11′15″E
- Operator: Ohmi Railway
- Line: ■ Ohmi Railway Main Line
- Distance: 31.2 km from Maibara
- Platforms: 2 side platforms

Other information
- Station code: OR29
- Website: Official website

History
- Opened: October 1, 1900

Passengers
- FY2019: 125 daily
Location
- Location within Shiga Prefecture Location within Japan

Sakuragawa Station (桜川駅, Sakuragawa-eki) is a passenger railway station in located in the city of Higashiōmi, Shiga Prefecture, Japan, operated by the private railway operator Ohmi Railway.

== Lines ==
Sakuragawa Station is served by the Ohmi Railway Main Line, and is located 31.2 rail kilometers from the terminus of the line at Maibara Station.

== Station layout ==
The station consists of two unnumbered side platforms connected to the station building by a level crossing. The station building is unattended.

== Platforms ==
■ Main Line	for Hikone and Maibara
■ Main Line	for Yokaichi, Kibukawa and Omi-Hachiman

== Adjacent stations ==
«	Service	»
Ohmi Railway Main Line
Yōkaichi	Rapid	Hino
Kyocera-mae	Local	Asahi Ōtsuka

== History ==
Sakuragawa Station was opened on October 1, 1900.

== Passenger statistics ==
In fiscal 2019, the station was used by an average of 125 passengers daily (boarding passengers only).

== Surroundings ==
- Higashiomi City Gamo Higashi Elementary School
- Higashiomi City Gamo Medical Center
- Higashiomi City Hall Gamo Branch

== See also ==
- List of railway stations in Japan
