= Newton College (Japan) =

Private college in Japan

Coordinates: 35°05′17″N 136°11′07″E

Newton College (滋賀文化短期大学, Shiga bunka tanki daigaku) was a private junior college in Higashiomi, Shiga, Japan. It was originally established in 1990 as a junior women's college and became coeducational in 1997. It was reorganized as a substructure of Biwako Gakuin University (びわこ学院大学, Biwako gakuin daigaku) in 2009.
