= Liverpool City Region =

Strategic authority area in England

- Strategic authority area
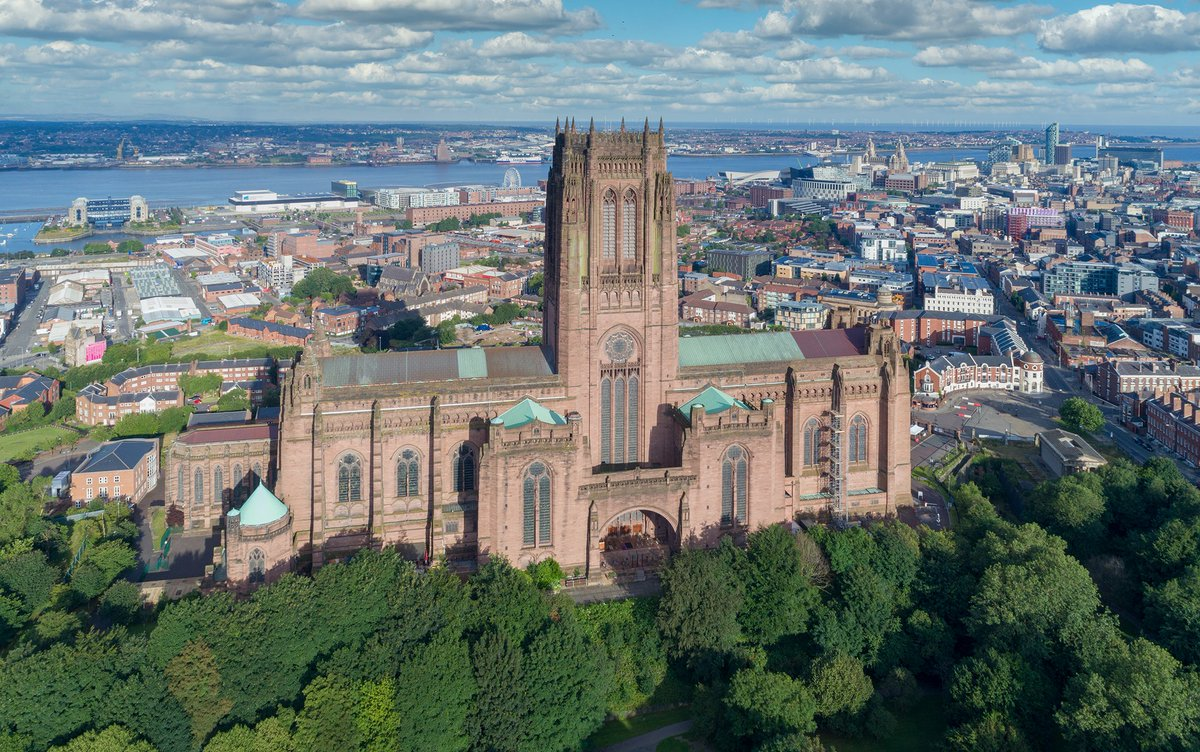
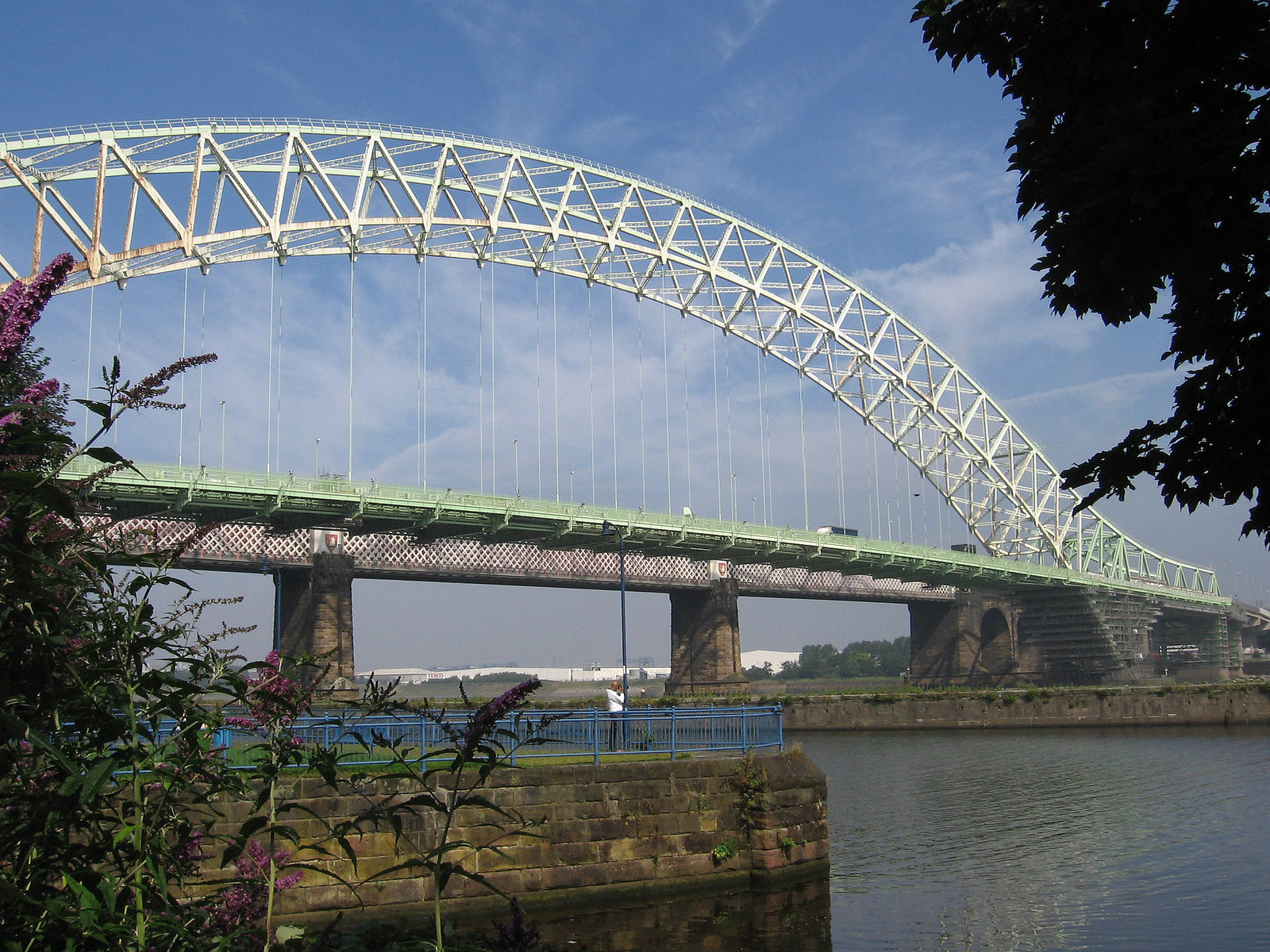
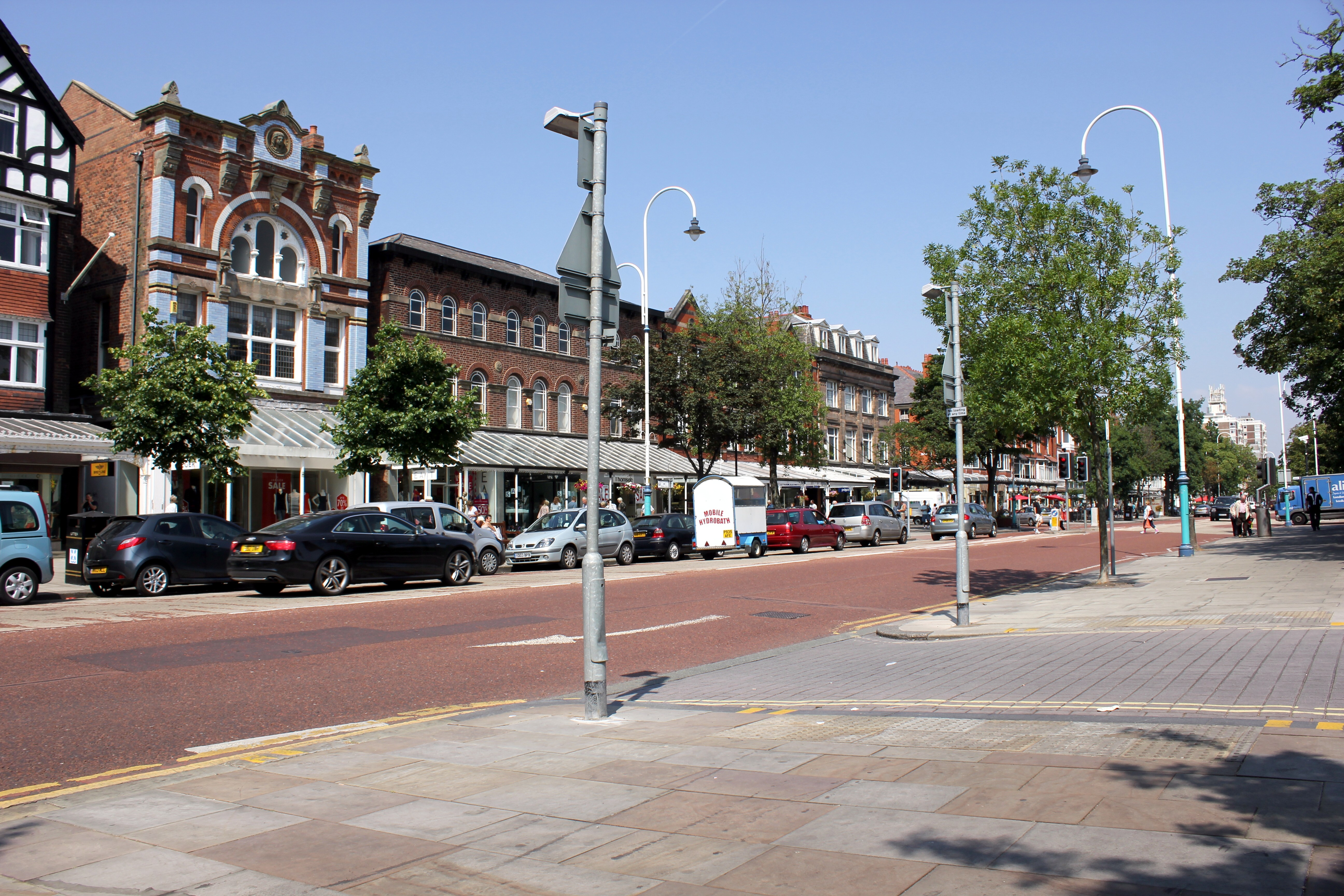
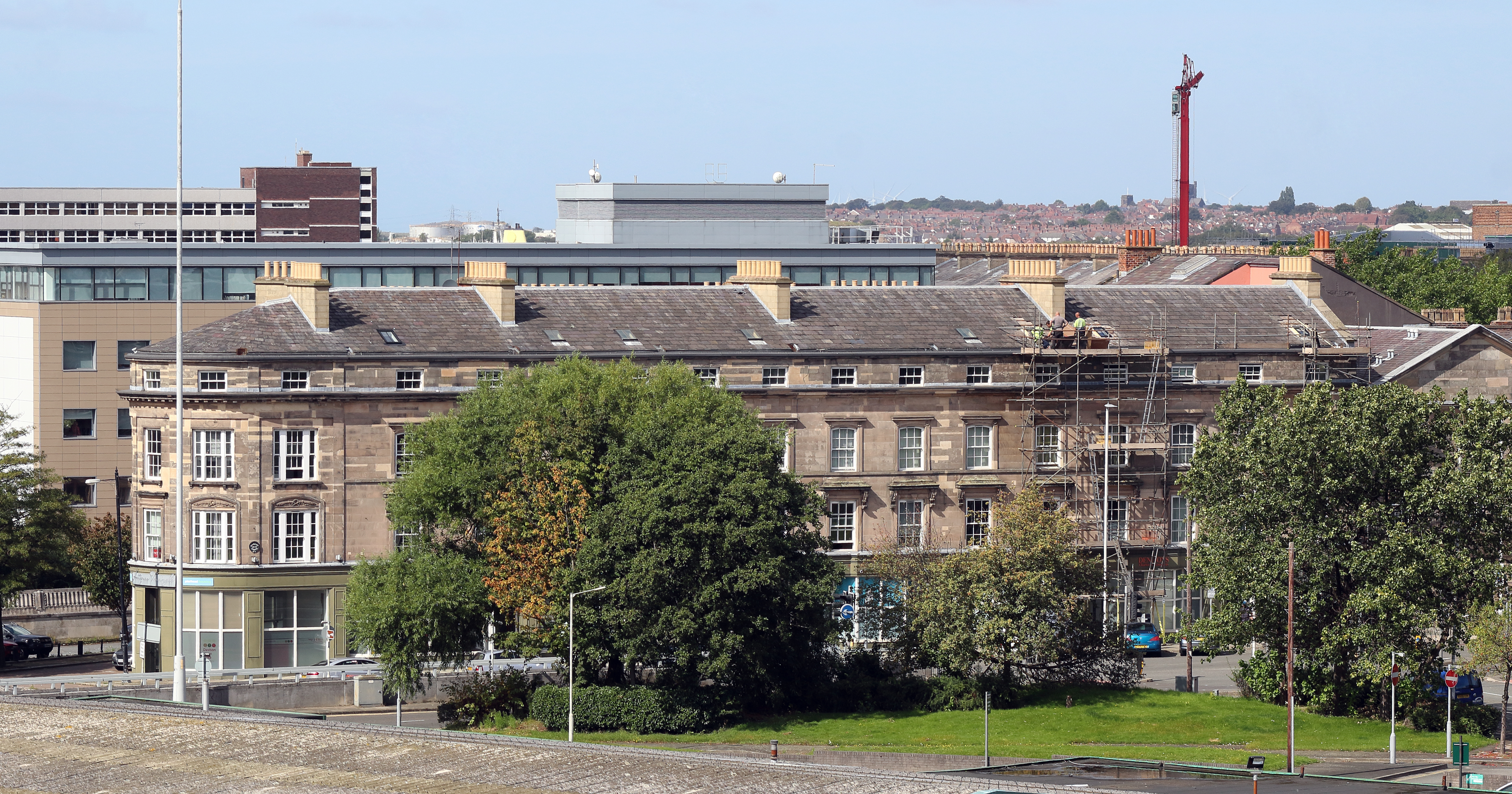
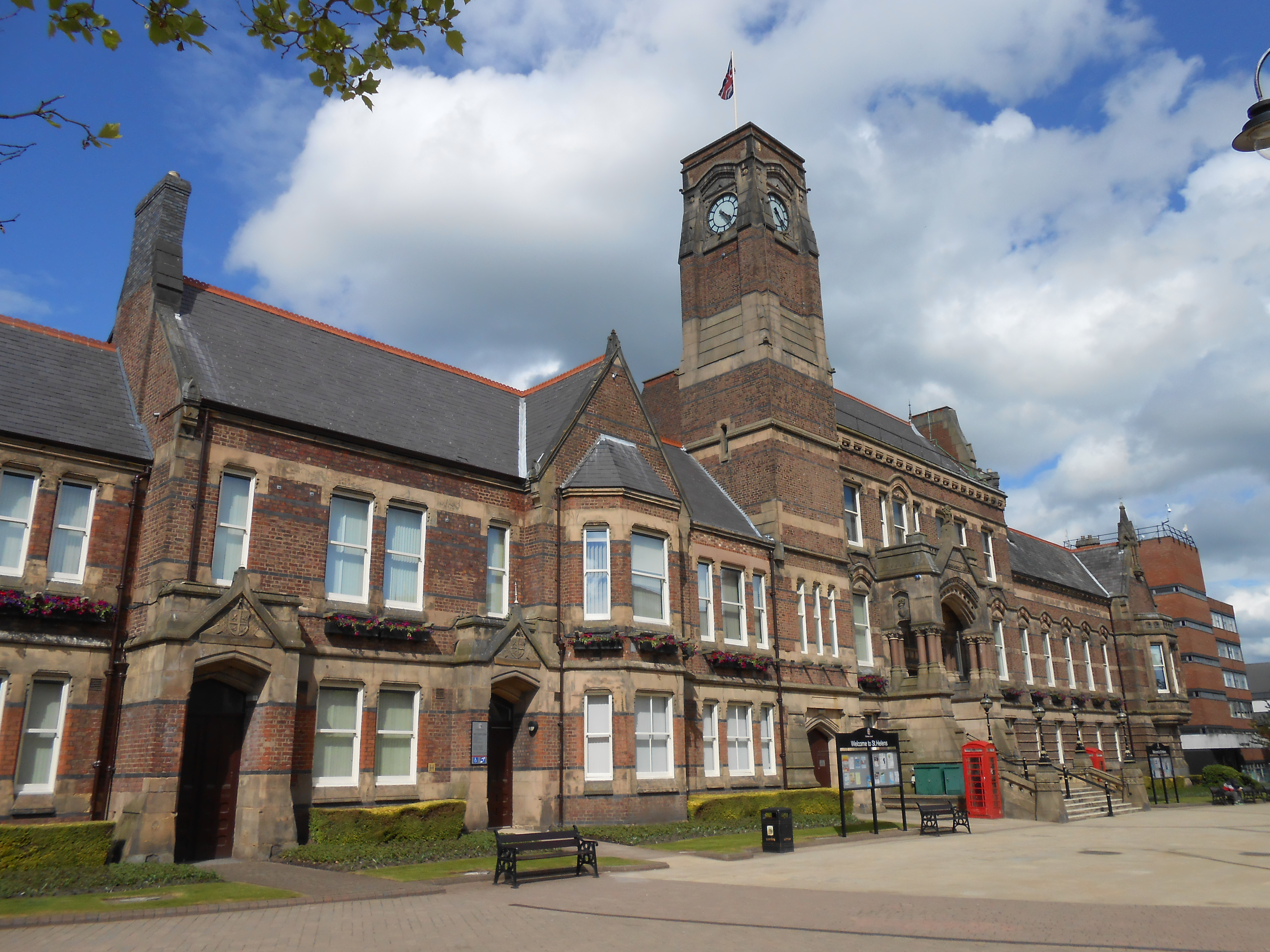
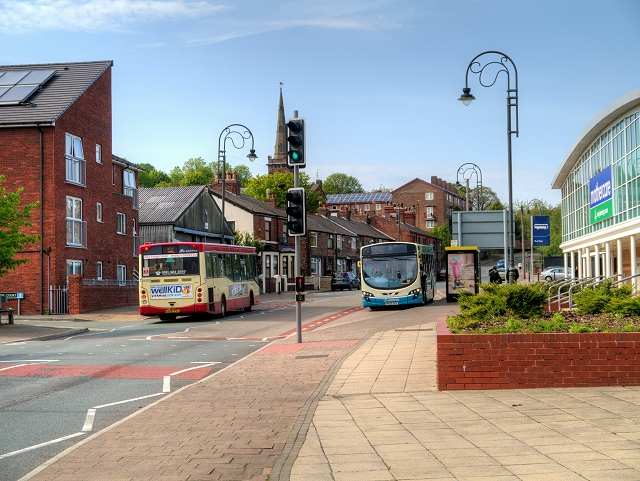
- From the top left to bottom right, Liverpool, Runcorn, Southport, Birkenhead, St Helens and Prescot

- Liverpool City Region shown within England
- Coordinates: 53.402°N 2.977°W
- Sovereign state: United Kingdom
- Country: England
- Region: North West
- Ceremonial counties: Merseyside; Cheshire (part)
- LEP established: 2010
- CA established: 1 April 2014
- Named for: Liverpool
- Administrative HQ: 1 Mann Island, Liverpool
- Districts: List: Halton; Knowsley; Liverpool; St Helens; Sefton; Wirral

Government
  - Type: Combined authority
  - Body: Liverpool City Region Combined Authority
  - Mayor: Steve Rotheram (L)

Area
  - Total: 349 sq mi (903 km^{2})
  - Land: 282 sq mi (731 km^{2})

Population (2025)
  - Total: 1,610,919
  - Rank: 6th
  - Density: 5,710/sq mi (2,203/km^{2})
- Time zone: UTC+0 (GMT)
  - Summer (DST): UTC+1 (BST)
- Postcode areas: CH; L; PR; WA; WN
- Dialling codes: 0151; 01704; 01744; 01925; 01928; 01942
- GSS code: E47000004
- ITL code: TLD7
- Website: liverpoolcityregion-ca.gov.uk

The Liverpool City Region is a strategic authority area in North West England. It has six council areas: the five metropolitan boroughs of Merseyside (Liverpool, Knowsley, St Helens, Sefton, Wirral) and the unitary authority of Halton in Cheshire. The city region had a population of 1,571,045 in 2022. Its largest settlement and administrative HQ is Liverpool.

The region's mayor and combined authority (LCRCA) have a devolution deal responsible for economic development, regeneration, transport, employment and skills, tourism, culture, housing, spatial planning and physical infrastructure.

The region's economic development was supported by the Liverpool City Region Local Enterprise Partnership (LEP), established in 2010 as the private sector-led board comprising political and business leaders from around the city region. The LEP's functions were merged into the combined authority in 2023.

== History ==
In 2004, the Government of the United Kingdom launched an initiative to strengthen the economy and quality of life in Northern England. Yorkshire Forward, One NorthEast, and the Northwest Regional Development Agency, the three regional development agencies in the North of England, were invited to form a partnership, and in September 2004, they published the document Moving Forward: The Northern Way First Growth Strategy Report.

Within the document, eight city regions in the North were identified, including the Liverpool city region. It was argued that economic growth could be accelerated with the establishment of new city region governance that surpassed existing administrative boundaries to more accurately reflect travel to work areas, catchment areas, housing market areas, and labour market areas.

On 13 March 2007, local government minister Phil Woolas announced plans to create a cabinet government including the leaders of the following six councils: Halton, Knowsley, Liverpool, Sefton, St Helens and Wirral. This decision triggered devolution for what was termed the 'Liverpool City Region'.

In January 2009, an agreement was made that the six local authorities would form the Liverpool City Region, in a Multi-Area Agreement (MAA). The agreement led to a transfer, from central government, greater responsibilities in more than ten areas covering employment, skills, transport, regeneration, housing and planning. Hazel Blears, the Secretary of State for Communities and Local Government said: "Today's 'Liverpool city-region' Multi-Area Agreement will mean Merseyside's six councils will no longer have to work alone on their economy, they will work from the same blueprint with more devolved powers to deliver jobs, training, welfare support and economic resilience."

== Definition ==
The combined authority of Liverpool City Region includes the local government districts of Liverpool, Halton, Knowsley, Sefton, St Helens and Wirral.

Some definitions of the city region include a much wider area. The now revoked North West of England Regional Spatial Strategy defined the city region for "the purposes of articulating RSS policy" as covering the six local authorities and extending "as far as Chester, Ellesmere Port and Neston and West Lancashire".

A 2011 report, Liverpool City Region –– Building on its Strengths, by an independent working group led by Michael Heseltine and Terry Leahy, stated that "what is now called Liverpool City Region has a population of around 1.5 million", but also referred to "an urban region that spreads from Wrexham and Flintshire to Chester, Warrington, West Lancashire and across to Southport", with a population of 2.3 million. The European Union's ESPON calculated the Liverpool metropolitan area to be over 2.2 million people.

The neighbouring local authorities of Warrington Borough Council and West Lancashire are associate members of the Liverpool City Region Combined Authority and thus co-operate (but do not vote) in the Liverpool city region meetings.

== Governance ==
=== Combined authority ===
==== Background ====
Since the abolition of Merseyside County Council, the councils have co-operated as permitted by the Local Government Act 1972 and required by the Local Government Act 1985, for example the Merseyside Waste Disposal Authority and the Merseyside Passenger Transport Authority. Liverpool City Region's proposal to central government for a combined authority was approved by Parliamentary statutory order in late March, and it legally came into existence from 1 April 2014. Liverpool City Region Combined Authority will become the top-tier administrative body of Liverpool City Region. It will be a body corporate responsible for strategic decision making. The six local authorities in the area constituting the combined authority will pool together powers over economic development, regeneration and transport policy. The combined authority originally comprised seven members: the council leaders of Halton, Knowsley, Sefton, St Helens and Wirral, the Mayor of Liverpool, a post replaced by Council Leader in 2023, and the chairperson, as the representative, of the local enterprise partnership. The proposed authority was known as the Liverpool City Region Combined Authority up until submission to the Department for Communities and Local Government and the Greater Merseyside Combined Authority in the published scheme. The consultation preceding the creation of the combined authority showed strong support for a name including 'Liverpool' rather than 'Merseyside', in order to capitalise and build upon Liverpool's global 'brand'. The name was changed to the Halton, Knowsley, Liverpool, St Helens, Sefton and Wirral Combined Authority in the draft order presented to parliament. On 21 February 2014 it was decided by the constituent councils that the authority will use the public name of Liverpool City Region Combined Authority.

==== Current Combined Authority ====
The Liverpool City Region Combined Authority (LCRCA) is the main governing body for the Liverpool City Region, providing governance of the City Region using powers devolved from Central Government, the current Composition of the Combined Authority is:

Constituent Members (Voting):

- Mayor of the Liverpool City Region (Leader and Chair)
- Council Leaders of Halton, Sefton, Liverpool, St Helens, Wirral and Knowsley (who serve as members of the Mayor's Cabinet, with one also serving as Deputy Mayor, at the Mayor's discretion)

As well as these members there are non voting non constituent members, such as the Police and Crime Commissioner for Merseyside, the police force for the city region.

==== Mayor of the Liverpool City Region ====
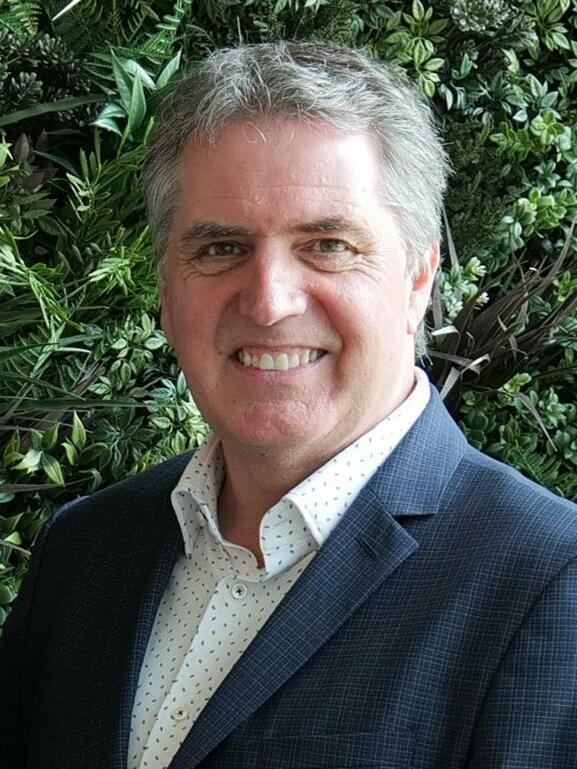
Mayor of the Liverpool City Region Steve Rotheram (L)

in 2016 the Cities and Local Government Devolution Act 2016 provided the provisions for Combined Authorities to establish directly elected mayors commonly referred to as "Metro Mayors" to lead their respective regions combined authorities. The LCRCA decided on the creation of a Mayor for the City Region, replacing the need of a Chairperson who previously oversaw CA meetings. in 2017 the first Mayoral election took place in which Steve Rotheram was elected as the first Mayor. At the time the office was styled "Metro Mayor of the Liverpool City Region" to avoid confusion with the "Mayor of Liverpool" the then council leader of Liverpool City Council, which was abolished in 2023 and replaced by a Council Leader inline with other councils in the City Region. Presently the Office is now styled as Mayor of the Liverpool City Region (Still sometimes referred to as a Metro Mayor).

The Mayor wields a number of powers devolved from central government and is seen as the chief representative of the city region in National and International affairs, and also serves as the Chairperson of the Combined Authority.

==== Local enterprise partnership ====
The Liverpool City Region Local Enterprise Partnership, which has now been absorbed by the LCRCA, was established in 2010 and was the local enterprise partnership (LEP) for Liverpool City Region.

The LEP initiated Mersey Waters Enterprise Zone, which was set up in 2012. The enterprise zone contains two sites, Liverpool Waters and Wirral Waters.

in April 2023 the LEP announced that it would be integrated as a department of the Combined Authority as the Business and Enterprise Board of the Liverpool City Region Combined Authority.

=== Members of Parliament ===
Constituency	Local authority district	Member of Parliament	Political party
Birkenhead	Wirral	Alison McGovern	Labour Party
Bootle	Sefton	Peter Dowd	Labour Party
Ellesmere Port and Bromborough (part)	Wirral	Justin Madders	Labour Party
Knowsley	Knowsley	Anneliese Midgley	Labour Party
Liverpool Garston	Liverpool	Maria Eagle	Labour Party
Liverpool Riverside	Liverpool	Kim Johnson	Labour Party
Liverpool Walton	Liverpool / Sefton	Dan Carden	Labour Party
Liverpool Wavertree	Liverpool	Paula Barker	Labour Party
Liverpool West Derby	Knowsley / Liverpool	Ian Byrne	Labour Party
Runcorn and Helsby (part)	Halton	Sarah Pochin	Reform UK
Sefton Central	Sefton	Bill Esterson	Labour Party
Southport (part)	Sefton	Patrick Hurley	Labour Party
St Helens North	St Helens	David Baines	Labour Party
St Helens South and Whiston	Knowsley / St Helens	Marie Rimmer	Labour Party
Wallasey	Wirral	Angela Eagle	Labour Party
Widnes and Halewood	Halton / Knowsley	Derek Twigg	Labour Party
Wirral West	Wirral	Matthew Patrick	Labour Party

== Demography ==
=== Population ===
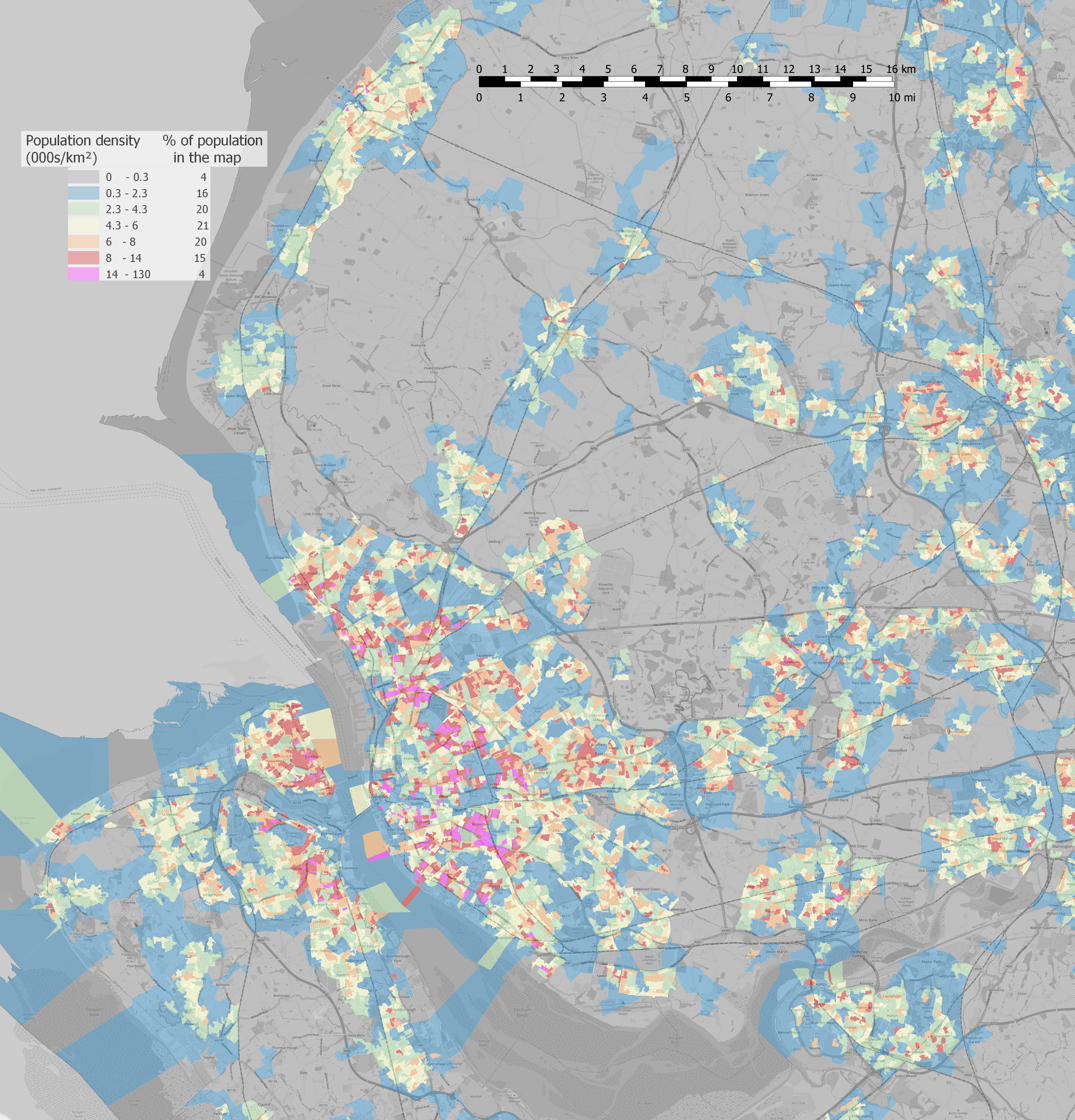
Population density map from the 2011 census

The region had a population of 1,610,919 in 2025.

Population of the Liverpool City Region by district (2025)
District	Land area		Population		Density (/km^{2})
District	(km^{2})	(%)	People	(%)	Density (/km^{2})
Halton	79	11%	131,912	8%	1,668
Knowsley	87	12%	163,723	10%	1,893
Liverpool	112	15%	507,915	32%	4,541
St Helens	136	19%	189,890	12%	1,393
Sefton	157	21%	287,583	18%	1,837
Wirral	161	22%	329,896	20%	2,050
Liverpool City Region	731	100%	1,610,919	100%	2,203

== Economy ==
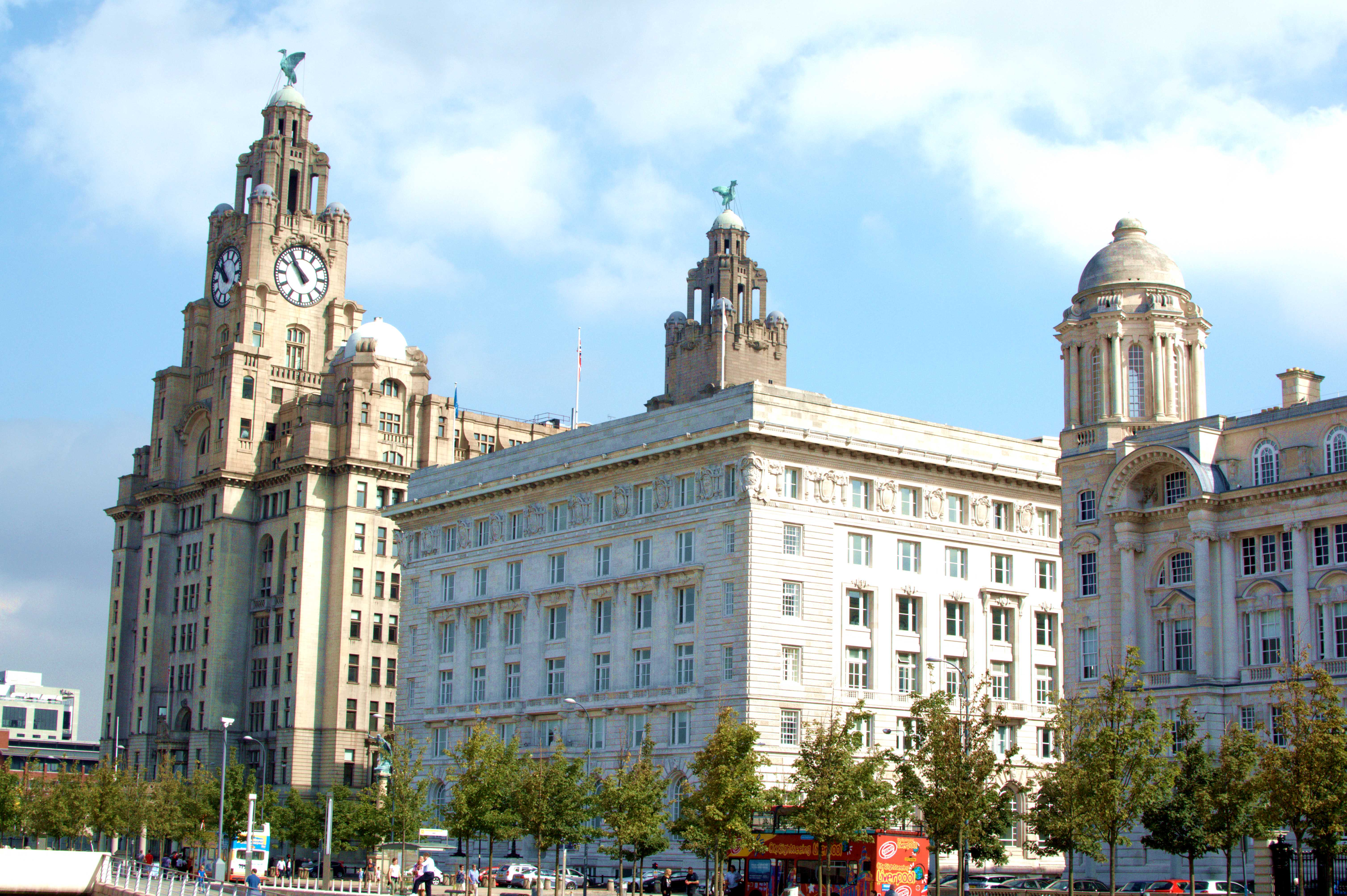
Liverpool has the largest wealth management industry in the UK outside of London. Global firms such as Pershing LLC, Investec and Rathbones have major offices in the city.

The Liverpool City Region is strongly established as an important driving force in the economy of Northern England and as a strategic sea and air gateway to the European Union. It connects to North America, Ireland, the Isle of Man, Europe and beyond; serving international, national and regional markets, investors and visitors. In 2008–2010, Liverpool had the UK's fastest growing economy outside London, one of the UK's top three biomedical centres, and has the UK's second largest wealth management industry.

The region is largely monocentric with Liverpool as the dominant employment centre, however economic activity is widely spread across the six districts. Broadly speaking Liverpool is the commercial, cultural and transport hub of the region, with Sefton as the base of Seaforth Dock and tourist resort of Southport, Halton as the location for chemical, science, technology, logistics and distribution companies, and Knowsley, St Helens and Wirral providing key manufacturing and logistics for the area. The city of Liverpool itself has a compact travel to work area reflecting its position on the North West Atlantic Seaboard and compactness of the surrounding urban area.

The city region is traditionally seen as a service sector economy, with its so called knowledge economy providing one third of the local employment base and over 40% of its total economic value. According to statistics for 2008, the Life sciences sector accounts for almost 10% of the region's economy, over 71,000 people are employed in financial and professional services, over 34,000 in manufacturing, and almost 24,000 in the creative and digital industry. The area is strongly connected to global markets, through its ports, airports and by its many multinational companies. World companies such as Barclays Wealth, Jaguar Land Rover, Maersk, Novartis, Sony and Unilever, all have a major base of operation in the locality.

GVA and GDP by local authority district in 2021
District	GVA (£ billions)	GVA per capita (£)	GDP (£ billions)	GDP per capita (£)
Halton	£4.0	£31,390	£4.5	£34,985
Knowsley	£4.0	£25,927	£4.6	£29,407
Liverpool	£14.3	£29,489	£15.9	£32,841
St Helens	£2.8	£15,448	£3.4	£18,803
Sefton	£4.6	£16,275	£5.4	£19,418
Wirral	£5.6	£17,527	£6.6	£20,688
Liverpool City Region	£35.3	£22,778	£40.5	£26,086

== Major projects in Liverpool City Region ==
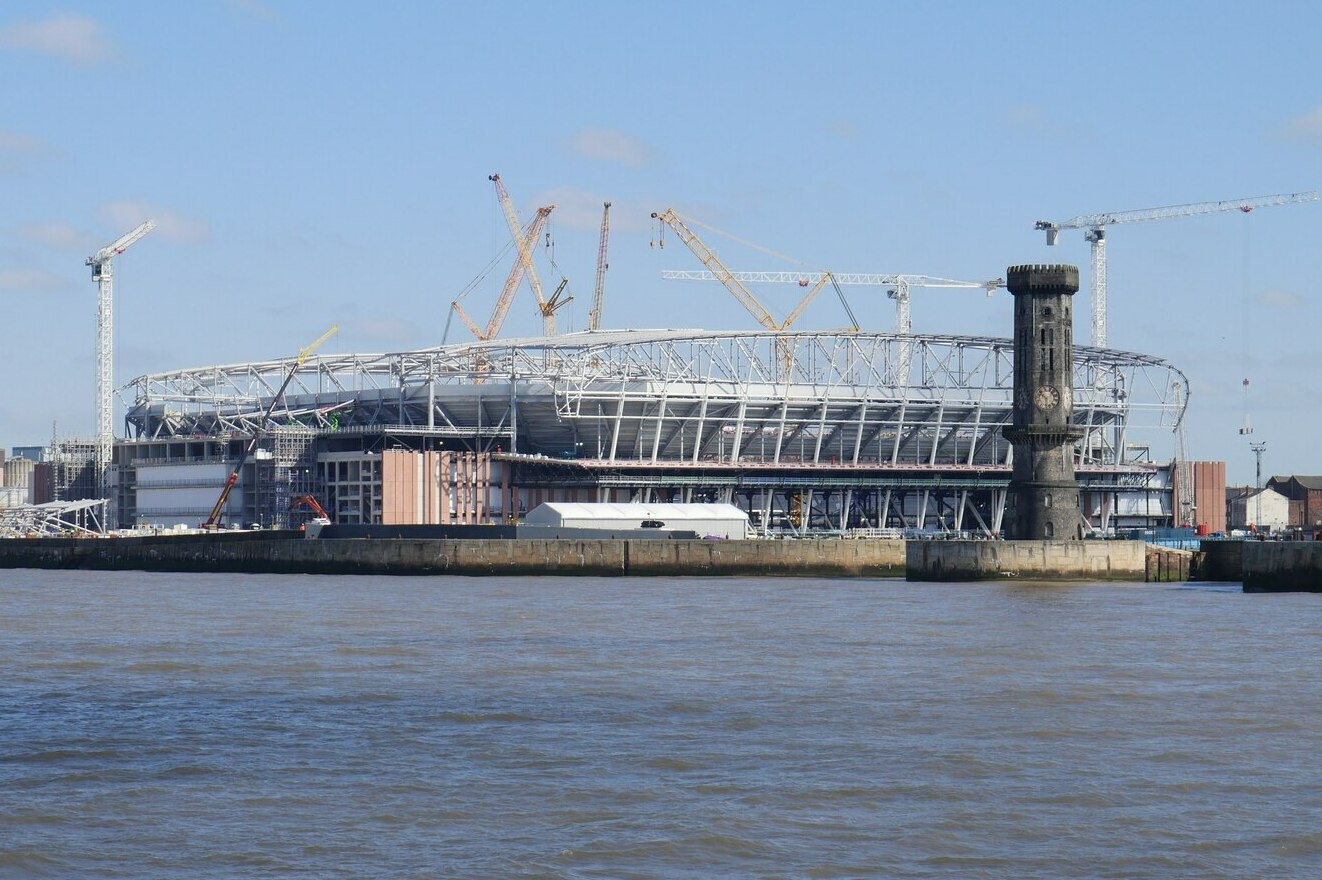
Construction of new Everton Stadium at Bramley-Moore Dock, Liverpool Waters. At the time of construction, it was regarded as the largest single-site private sector development in the United Kingdom

Since its creation, the Liverpool City Region authorities have overseen and invested in some of the UK's largest and most ambitious development and infrastructure schemes which include the following:

=== Ongoing schemes ===
- Liverpool Waters
- Wirral Waters
- Knowledge Quarter, Liverpool
- Sci-Tech Daresbury
- Transformation of North Liverpool
- Liverpool Shopping Park
- Biomass Power Stations along the River Mersey and Manchester Ship Canal
- Runcorn station quarter

=== Completed schemes ===
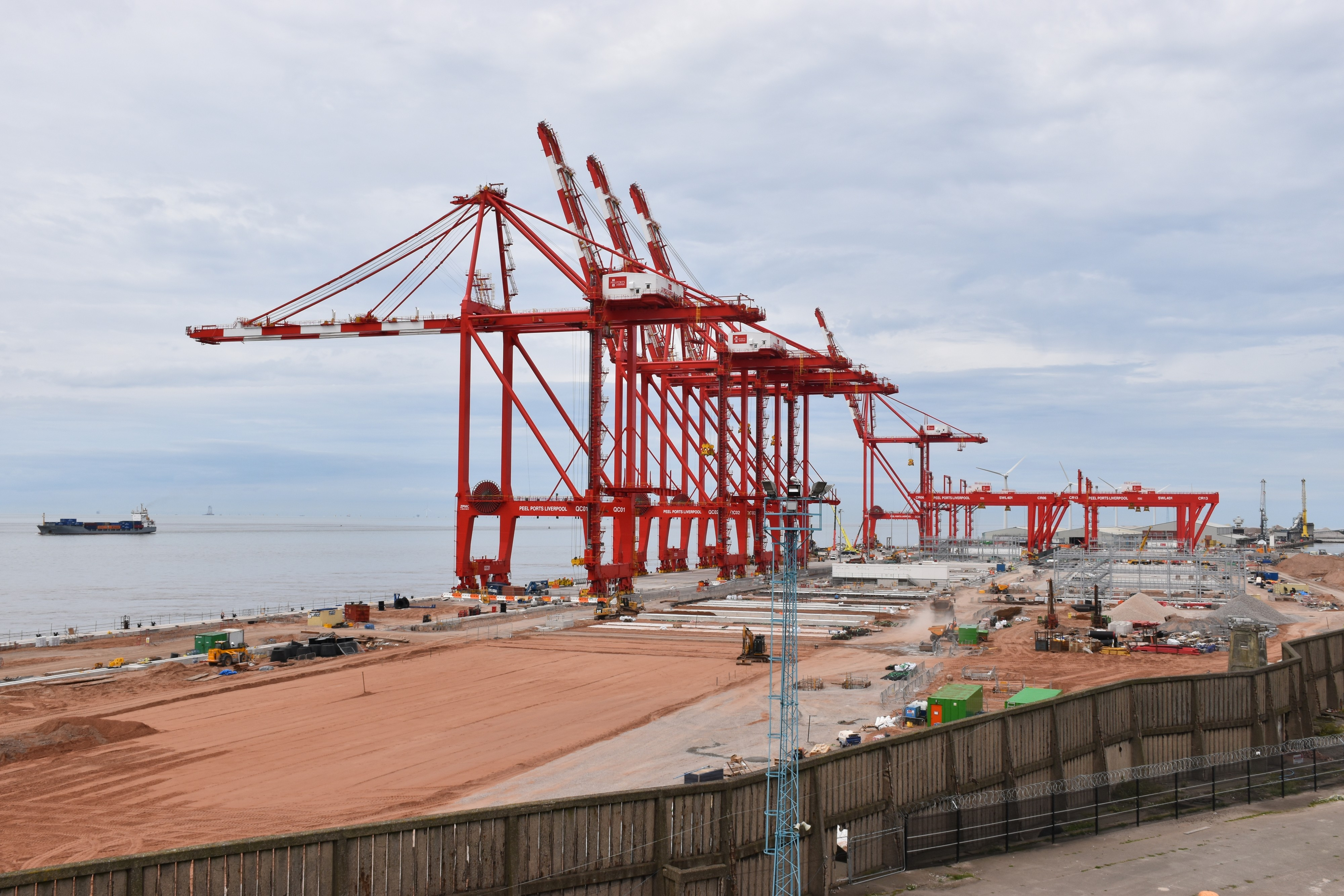
Liverpool 2 Container Terminal built to expand the UK's largest transatlantic port based in Liverpool.

- Mersey Gateway Bridge
- New Royal Liverpool University Hospital and Bio Campus
- Expansion of the Mersey Multimodal Gateway (3MG)
- Liverpool 2 Container Terminal
- Gladstone Dock widening

=== Future schemes ===
- New Liverpool Cruise Terminal
- Liverpool city centre commercial district expansion
- Round 2.5 and Round 3 Irish Sea offshore wind farms
- River Mersey tidal barrage
- Littlewoods film & TV studios to become 'Hollywood of the North'

=== Abandoned or schemes of unknown status ===
- International Trade Centre, Wirral
- Environmental Technology Zone, Liverpool city centre

== Transport ==
The Liverpool City Region has a transport network that is connected locally, nationally, and internationally by road, rail, sea and air.

=== Merseytravel ===
Merseytravel (renaming to Transport for Liverpool City Region (TfLCR) in the future) is the public transport agency of the Liverpool City Region Combined Authority, and is responsible for delivering local public transport within the Liverpool City Region, and has control over the local train network Merseyrail and the bus network using the Metro brand, which since 2024 are under public control and ownership through a franchise system, the agency also controls some other transport related operations in the LCR.

=== Road and cycling ===
Road, Cycling and Rail in the Liverpool City Region

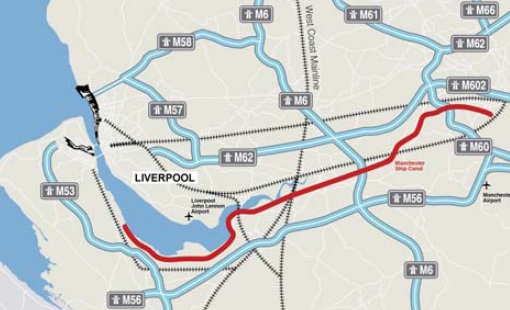
Motorway network around the Liverpool City Region

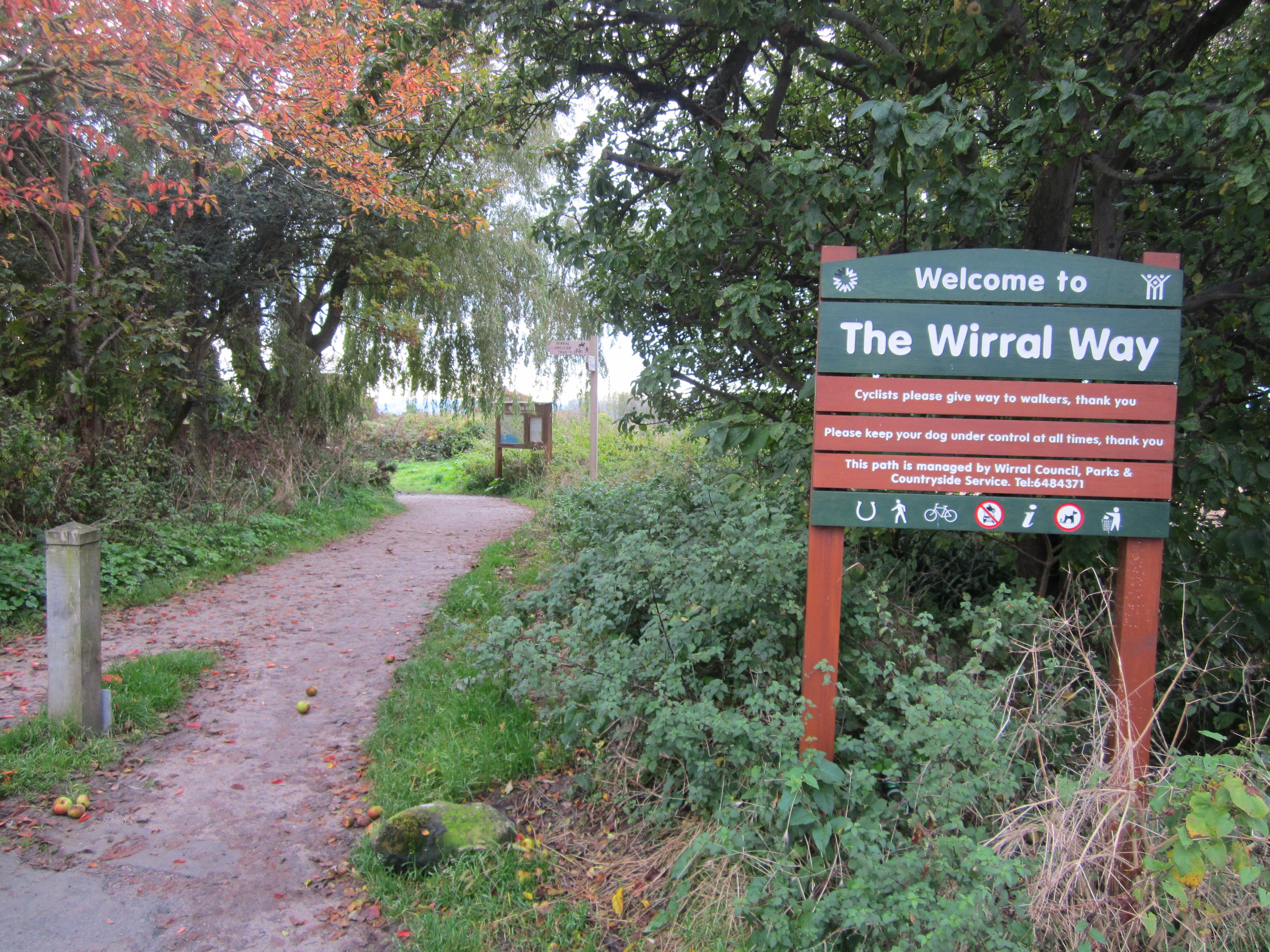
Wirral Way, cycle and bridle path, West Kirby

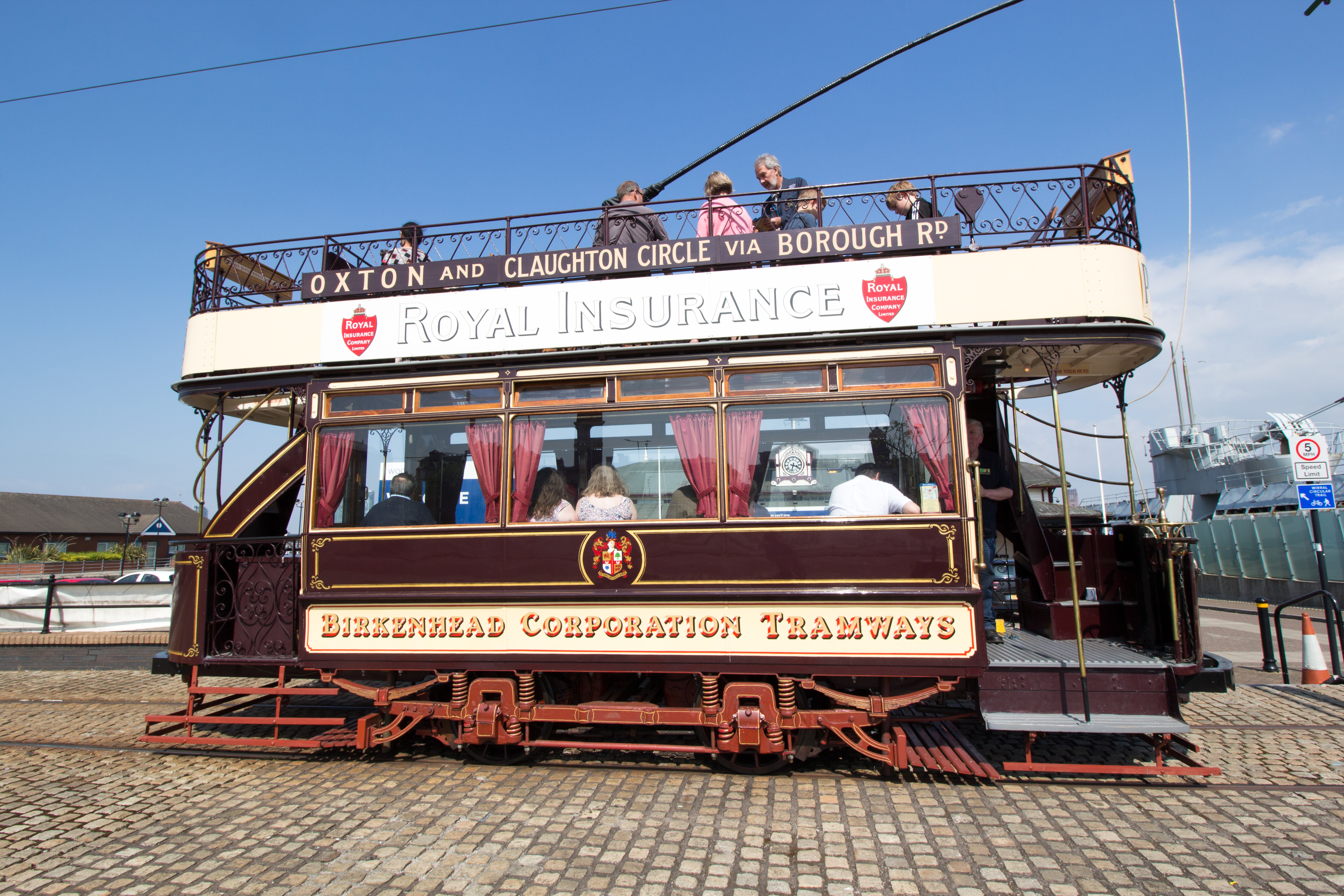
Wirral Tramway

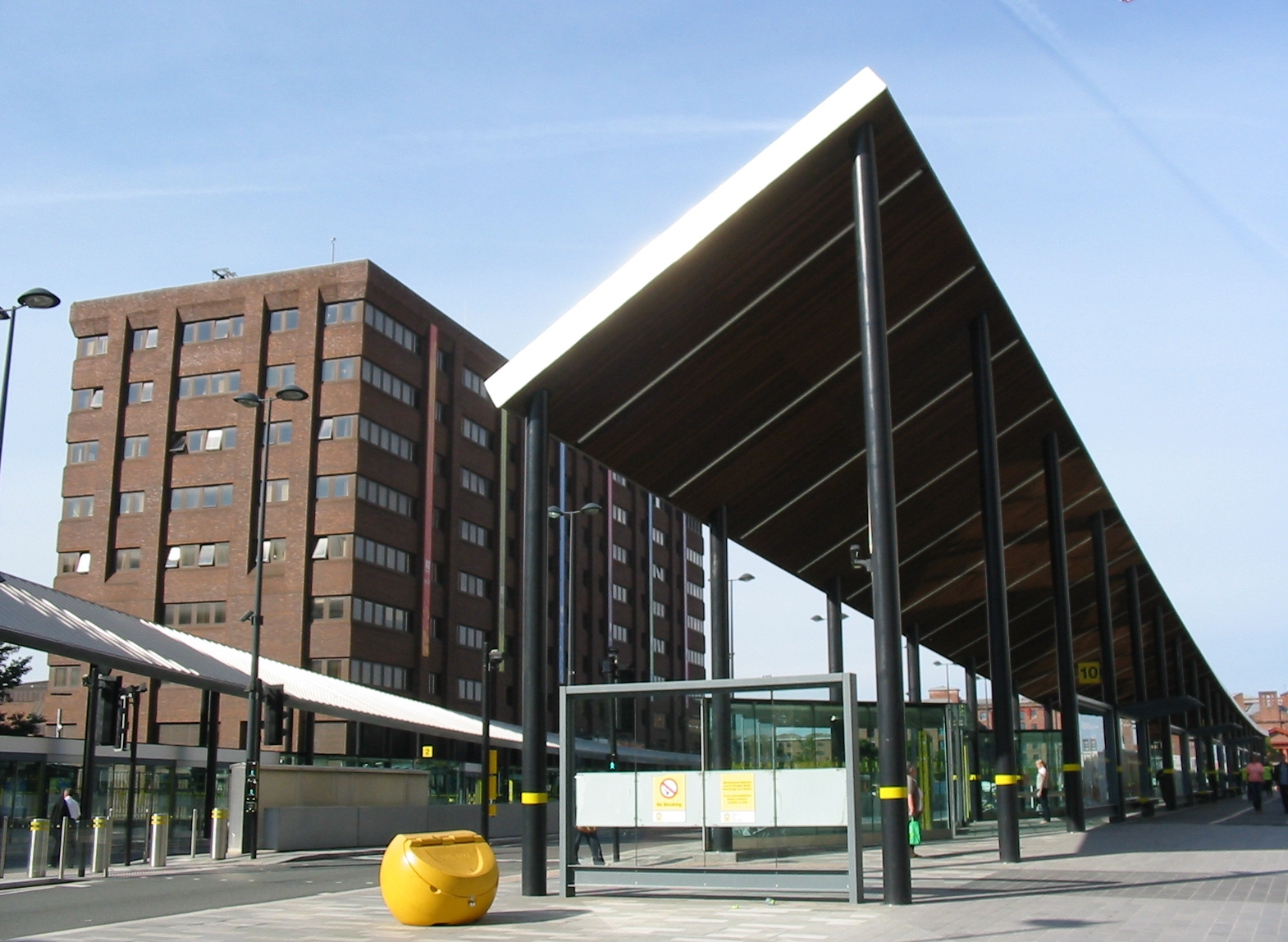
Liverpool One bus station for regular buses and National Express services

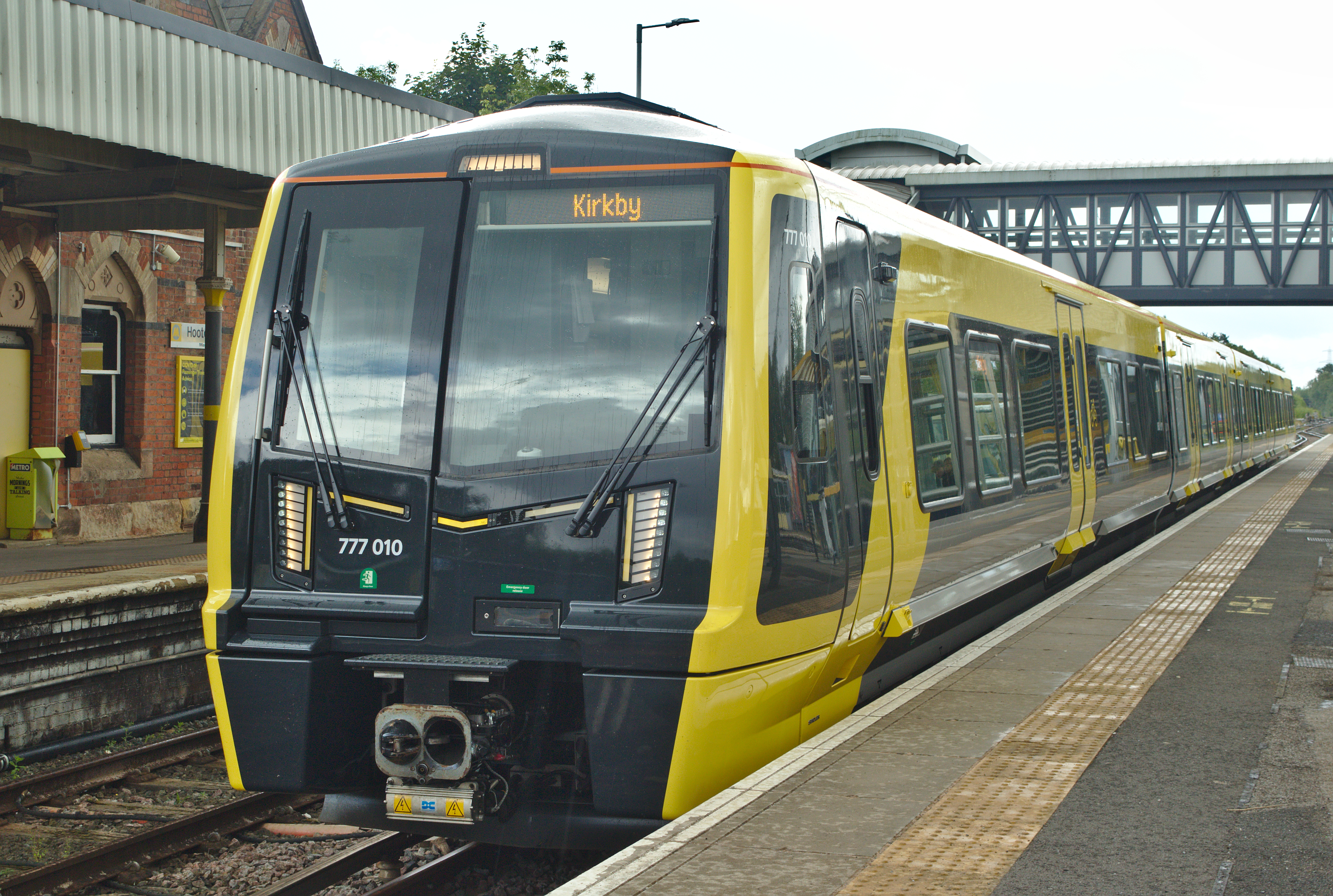
Typical Merseyrail train heading towards Kirkby railway station

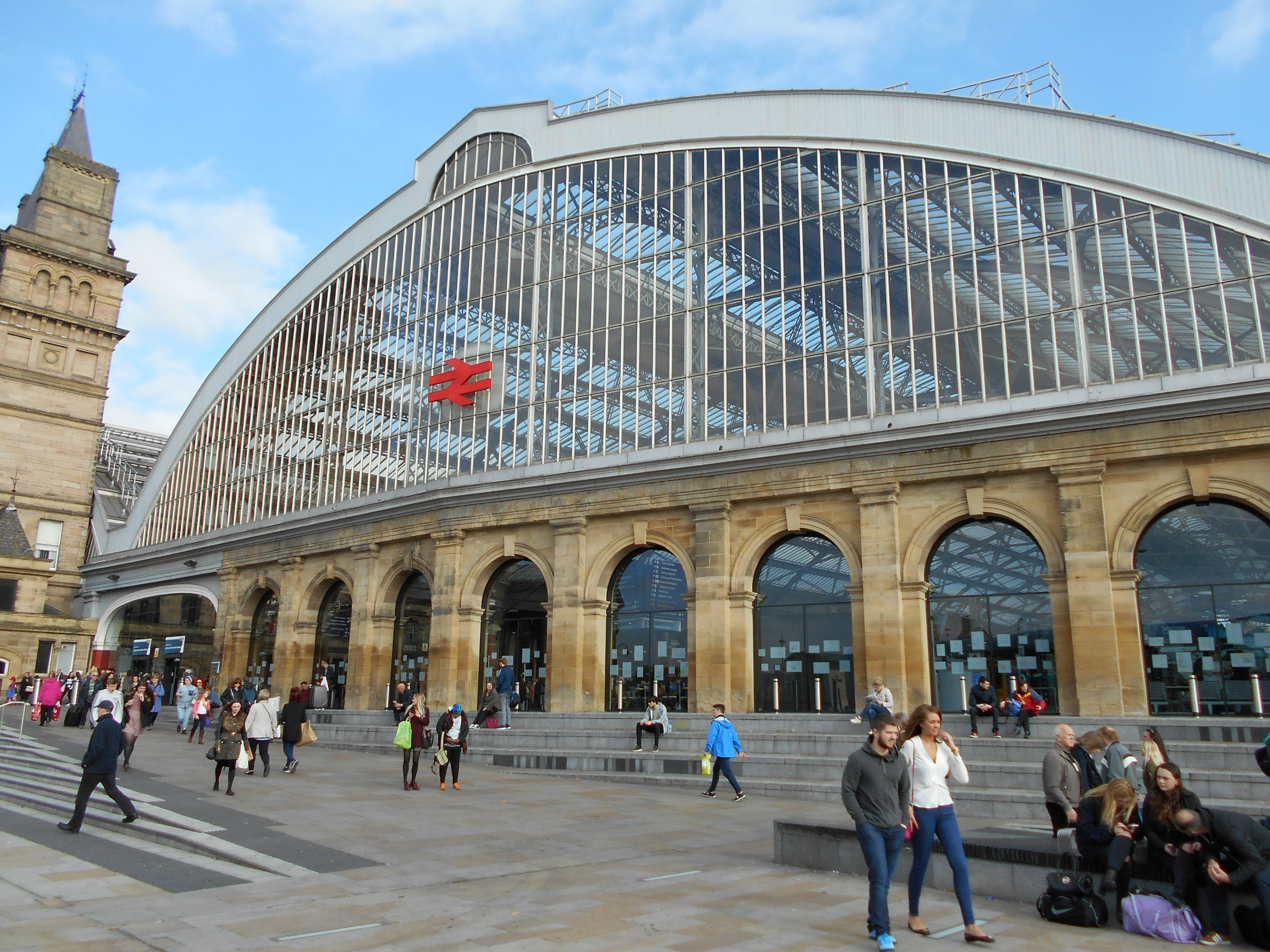
Liverpool Lime Street railway station, one of the top ten busiest railway stations in the UK outside London

The region is served by a network of six motorways (M58 to the north, M56 to the south, M6 & M62 to the east and M53 to the west). In addition, the M57 acts as an outer ring road and bypass for the city of Liverpool itself. The area has relatively low road congestion and its central location makes it an efficient base from which to service the whole country. Various parts of the region are separated by the River Mersey, and as a result, Wirral is connected to the centre of Liverpool via the Queensway Tunnel and Kingsway Tunnel, whereas Widnes and Runcorn are connected by the Silver Jubilee Bridge. A second six-lane toll bridge under the name Mersey Gateway, to relieve congestion on the ageing Silver Jubilee Bridge, opened in 2017. The bridge is designed to improve transport links between Widnes and Runcorn and other key locations in the vicinity.

Major cycling routes on the National Cycle Network (such as National Cycle Route 56 and National Cycle Route 62) pass through the region too such as New Brighton and the Wirral Way. Major bus companies are Stagecoach Merseyside and Arriva North West. Liverpool One bus station serves as a terminus for national coach travel.

=== Rail ===
Liverpool Lime Street, the region's main terminal train station, is served by six train operating companies serving a wide variety of destinations, and is used by 11.8 million passengers per year. Improved rail connectivity, including upgrades to the West Coast Main Line and investment in high speed Pendolino trains, means journey time to London Euston is within two hours via Avanti West Coast. East Midlands Railway serves Norwich, Manchester, Sheffield and Nottingham. TransPennine Express operates daily services to Leeds, Middlesbrough, Hull, York, and Newcastle. Northern operates to Huddersfield, Preston, Warrington, and Blackpool, whilst direct links to Birmingham are possible via West Midlands Trains.

The sub-regional rail network is operated by Merseytravel, the combined Passenger Transport Executive and integrated transport authority and public sector body responsible for the coordination of public transport across the Liverpool City Region. Merseyrail is an urban rail operating almost 800 trains per day carrying over 100,000 passengers within the city region, on its network of 68 stations. The Merseyrail network includes five underground stations in Liverpool City Centre and Birkenhead centre.

==== Commuter and regional railway lines ====
- Borderlands line connects Wirral to Wales.
- City Line (Merseytravel)
  - Liverpool–Wigan line (and onward to Preston via the West Coast Main Line)
  - Liverpool–Manchester lines (Middle and Southern Routes, including the branch to Warrington Bank Quay)
  - Crewe–Liverpool line (and onward to Birmingham New Street via the West Coast Main Line)

==== Merseyrail commuter lines ====
- Northern line (Merseyrail)
- Wirral line

==== High speed rail ====
The UK government has insisted that the region will benefit from England's new high-speed rail network, due for completion by 2032, even though the new line will not extend into the region. Journey times to London from Liverpool would be cut by 32 minutes under the proposals. Pressure has been put on the government to extend high speed rail into Liverpool's city centre.

=== Maritime ===
Maritime transport in the Liverpool City Region

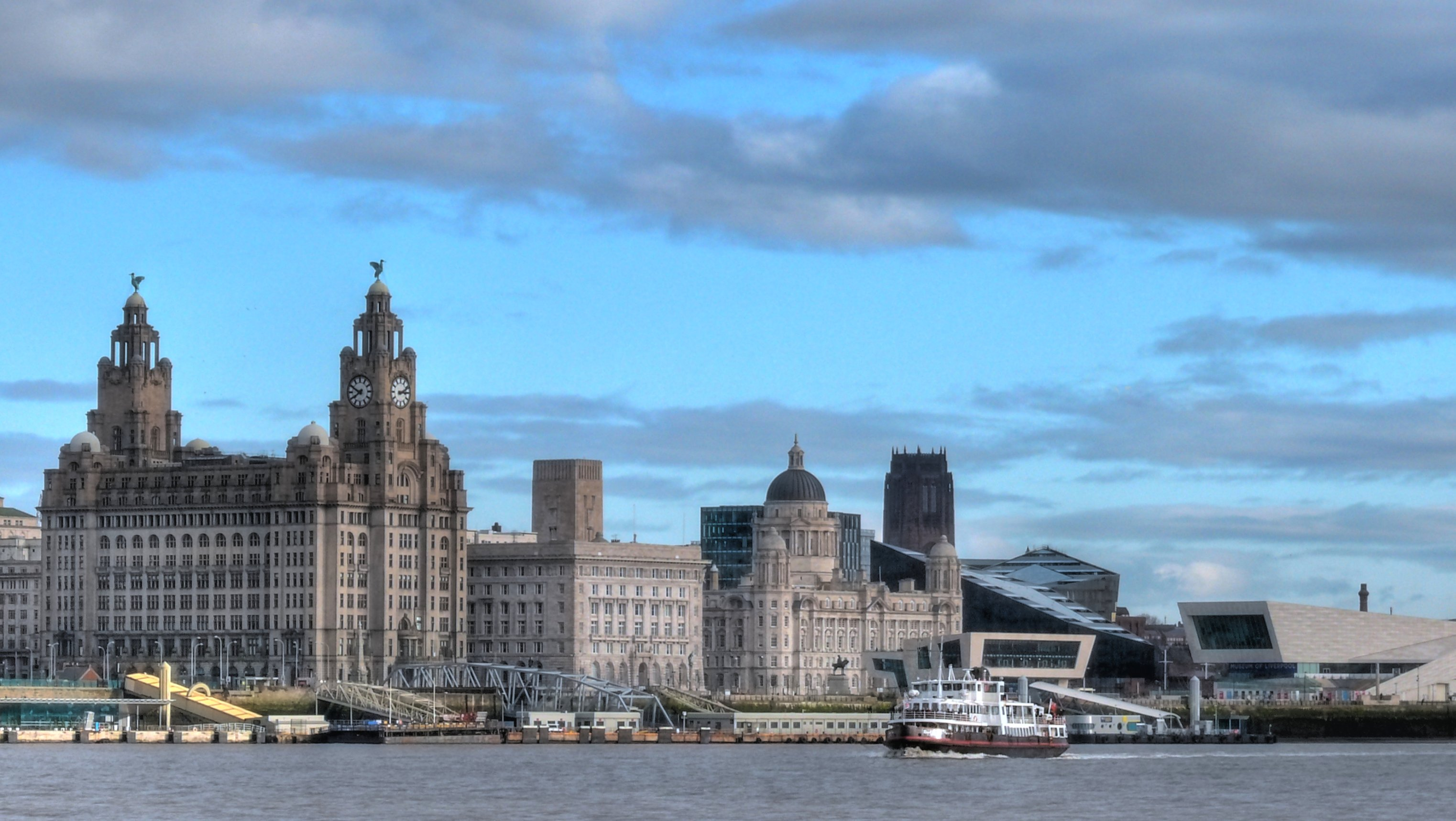
Liverpool Cruise Terminal, Pier Head and Mersey Ferry terminal

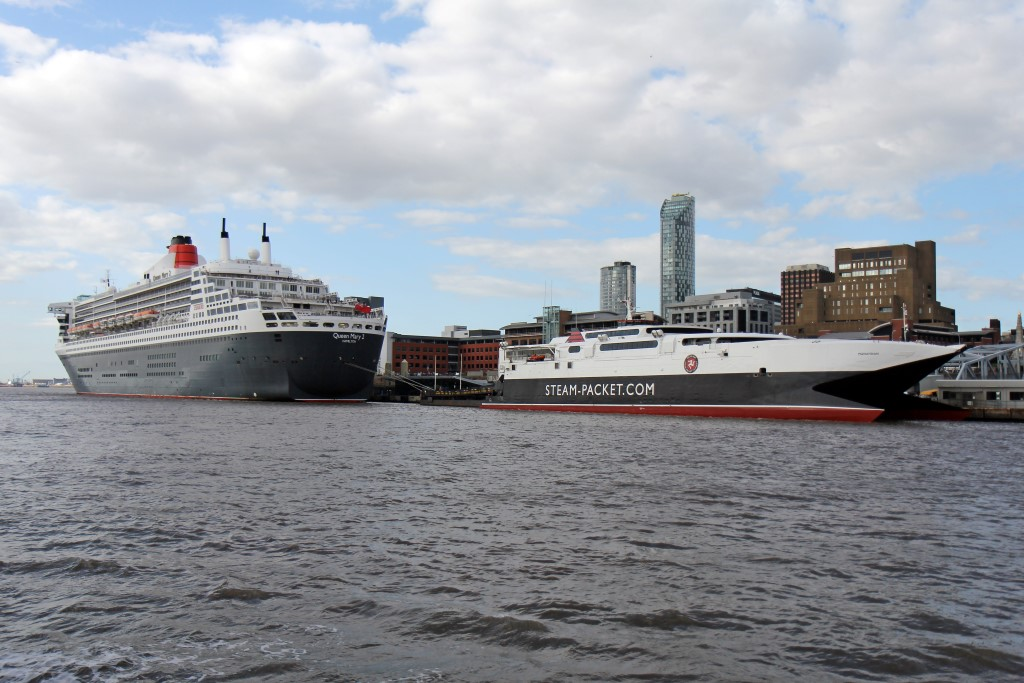
Queen Mary 2 with Isle of Man Steam Packet Company ferry HSC Manannan at Pier Head

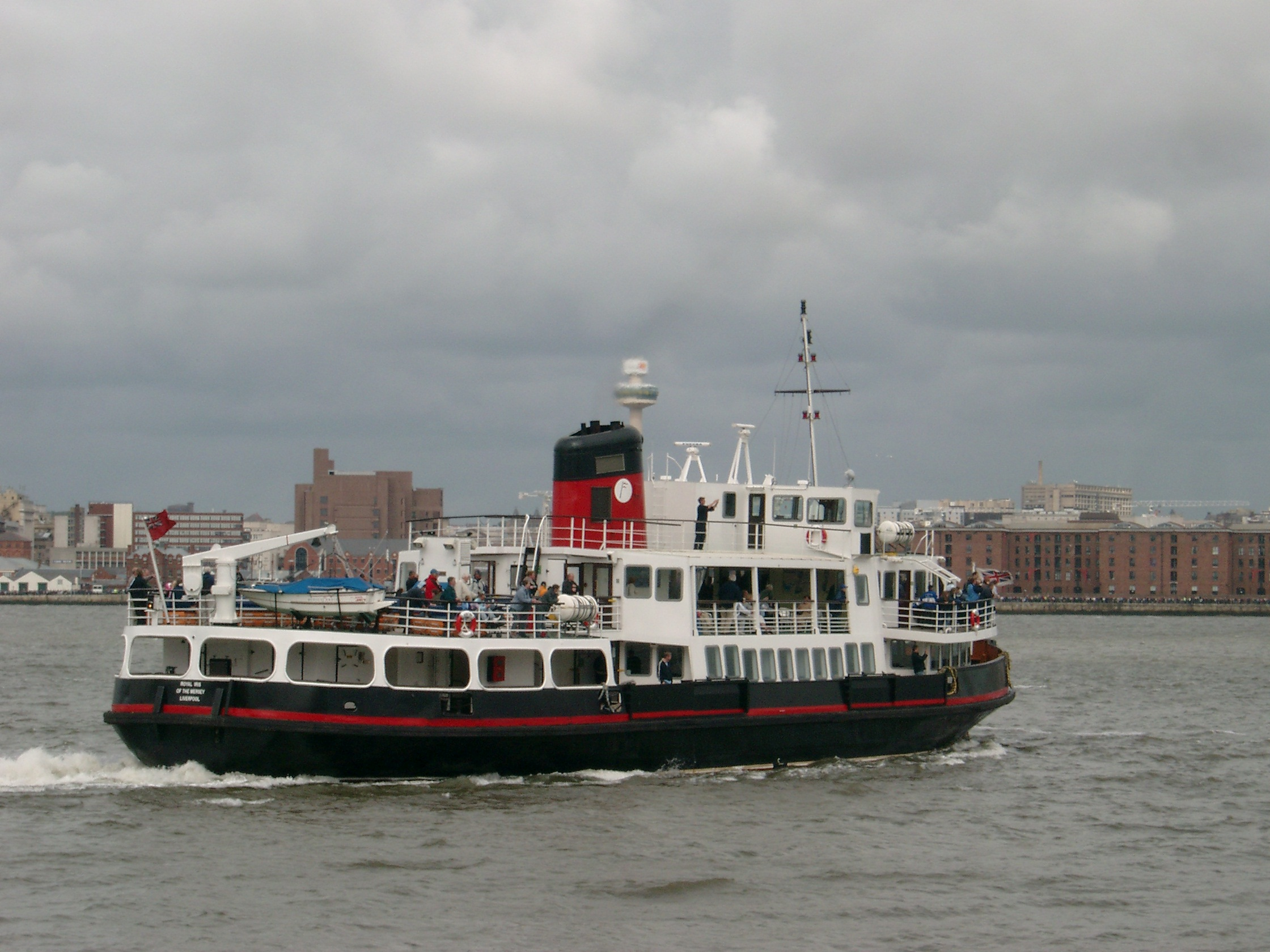
Mersey Ferry MV Royal Iris

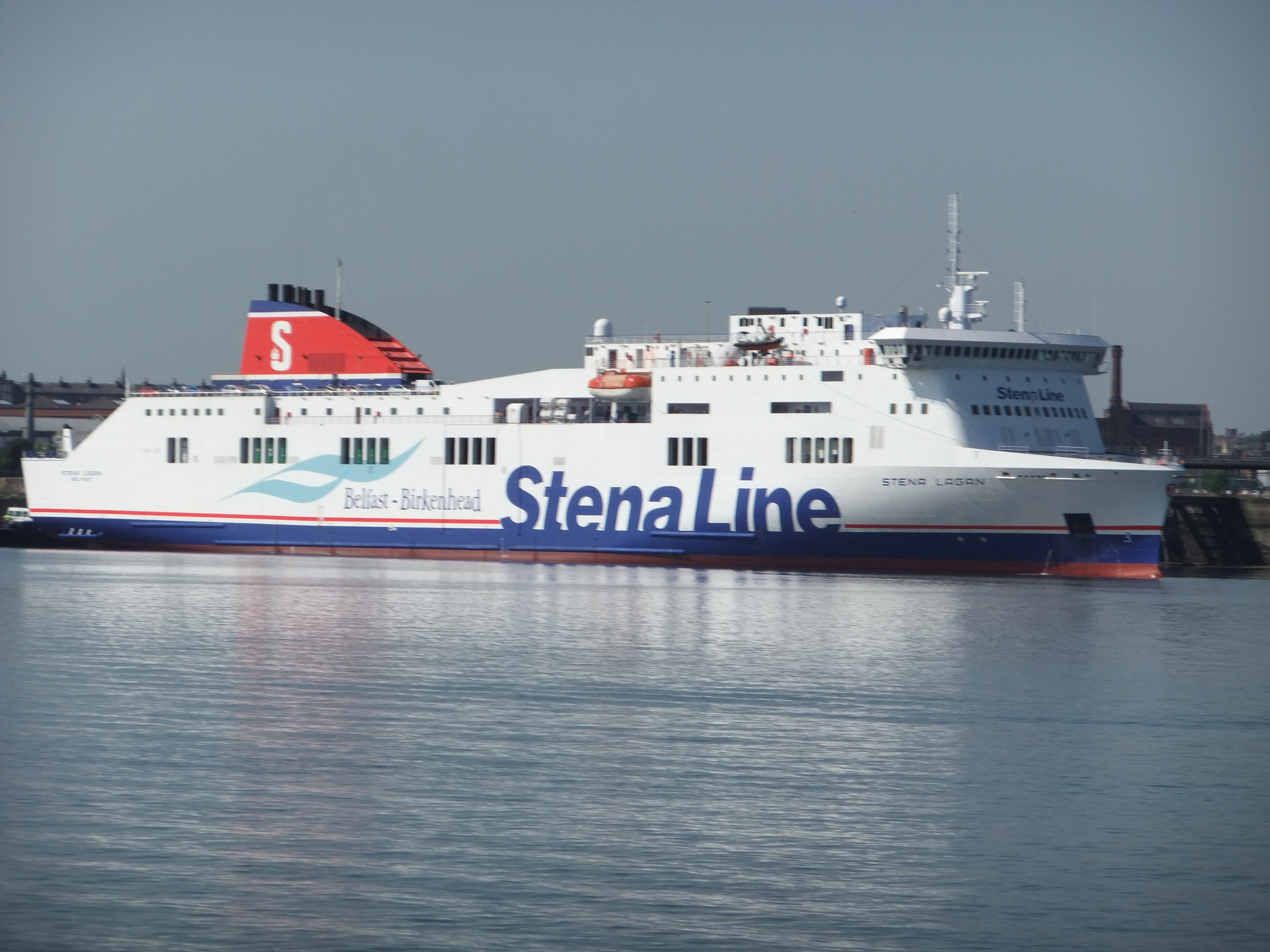
Twelve Quays Ferry Terminal, Birkenhead for services to Belfast, Northern Ireland

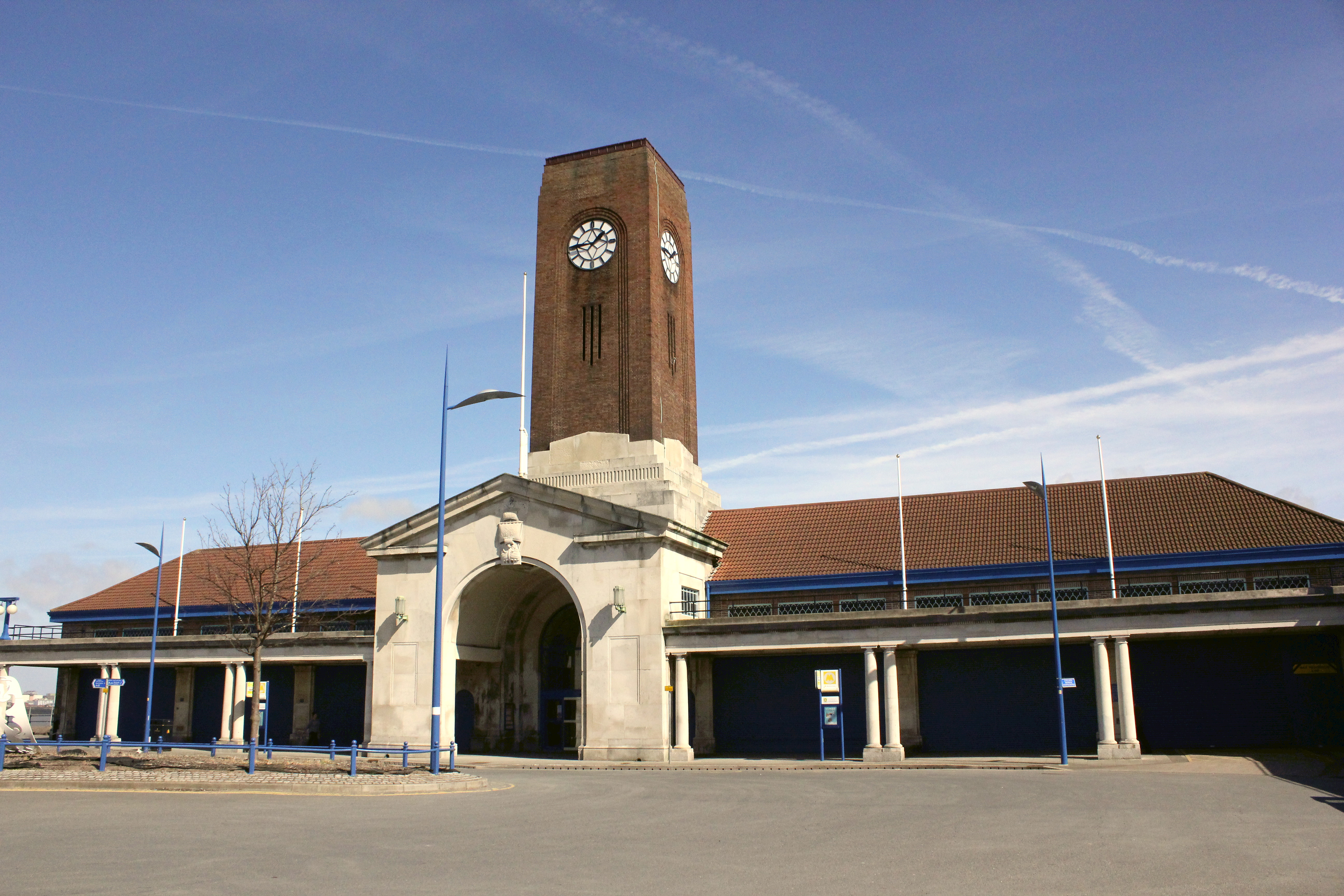
Seacombe Ferry Terminal for regular Mersey Ferry commuter services and River Mersey cruises

Irish Sea ferry routes from Liverpool to Belfast, Isle of Man and Dublin

Liverpool Cruise Terminal provides long-distance passenger cruises, Fred. Olsen Cruise Lines MS Black Watch and Cruise & Maritime Voyages MS Magellan using the terminal to depart to Iceland, France, Spain and Norway. Leeds and Liverpool Canal and Manchester Ship Canal are the main canal systems.

==== Ferries ====
Prince's Landing Stage, Pier Head, Liverpool serves Isle of Man Steam Packet Company summer service to the Isle of Man (and Mersey Ferries). Twelve Quays, Birkenhead ferry port serves winter Isle of Man ferry service and Stena Line to Belfast, Northern Ireland.

The Mersey Ferry has operated since the 1200s, currently between Wirral and Liverpool City Centre at Seacombe, Woodside and Liverpool Pier Head. From 2009–2010 it had 684,000 passengers using the service .

==== Commercial ====
The Port of Liverpool handles most commercial shipping, but several other ports on the Wirral peninsula, such as Great Float and Queen Elizabeth II Dock, operate too.

The Port of Liverpool is container ports that handles over 33 million tonnes of freight cargo per year and serves more than 100 global destinations including Africa, Australia, China, India, the Middle East and South America. Imports include grain and animal feed, timber, steel, coal, cocoa, crude oil, edible oils and liquid chemicals; and exports of scrap metal for recycling. A second container terminal, Liverpool2 at Seaforth, was designed to handle the largest Post-Panamax vessels and doubled the port's capacity when it opened in 2016.

Almost three quarters of a million people travel on Irish Sea ferry services from Liverpool Docks and Birkenhead's Twelve Quays to Belfast, Dublin and the Isle of Man, and there is a growing number of cruise ships making day calls at the port. A new terminal at Prince's Dock provides check-in, baggage drop and reclaim, as well as customs and border facilities for thousands of cruise liner passengers visiting the region, whilst Peel Ports have also planned a second cruise terminal as part of the Liverpool Waters project.

=== Air ===
Global air connectivity to and from the region is provided by two international airports: Liverpool John Lennon Airport (LJLA) is one of the oldest operational airports in the United Kingdom. Manchester Airport is situated 29 miles from Liverpool city centre.

Liverpool John Lennon Airport, situated 6.5 miles (10.5 km) south east of Liverpool city centre is a growing airport with annual passenger numbers approaching 5 million, making it one of the UK's busiest airports.

Liverpool John Lennon Airport serves more than 60 direct routes which include most major European cities. This extends to over 150 destinations across five continents via a dedicated one-stop hub connection flight to Frankfurt Airport, courtesy of Lufthansa. The airport is served by easyJet, Ryanair, Lufthansa, Jet2.com, Wizz Air, Play Airlines, Aer Lingus, Loganair and Widerøe.

As part of LJLA's Master Plan, the airport is planning for substantial expansion between 2030 - 2050. This includes larger terminal buildings in order to handle extra passengers, extending the runway, targeting permanent direct long haul flights and creating new hotels, restaurants and commercial space. The expansion plans have sparked concerns by local environmental campaign groups who suggest that expanded airport facilities will encroach on surrounding green space and agricultural land, especially at Oglet Shore. There are also concerns that growth in passenger numbers will have a negative effect on climate change. The airport has responded by saying it 'naturally recognises its wider environmental responsibilities' and has promised measures to protect the areas around the Oglet Shore, with proposals for a revitalised 50 hectare coastal reserve. The airport argues that it brings significant economic benefits to the city region by supporting its international visitor economy and providing jobs for local people. Airport bosses also plan to reach net carbon zero by 2040 through on site renewable energy generation.

== Media ==
The Liverpool City Region is covered by BBC North West and ITV Granada. TalkLiverpool is a local television station serving the Liverpool City Region and surrounding areas which broadcasts to the area. Television signals in the area are received from the Winter Hill TV transmitter and the Storeton relay transmitter which is situated in the Wirral Peninsula.

The area has several radio stations including, BBC Radio Merseyside, Capital Liverpool, Hits Radio Liverpool (formerly Radio City), Greatest Hits Radio Liverpool & The North West, In Demand Radio, Liverpool Live Radio, Heart North West and Smooth North West.

Local newspaper that serves the Liverpool City Region is the Echo that publishes daily on print and online.

== See also ==
- 2024 Liverpool City Region mayoral election
- 2021 Liverpool City Region mayoral election
- 2017 Liverpool City Region mayoral election
- Healthcare in Liverpool
- List of metropolitan areas in the United Kingdom
- Mersey Barrage
