= Catchment area =

Trade or use area for a given service or business

In human geography, a catchment area is the area from which a location, such as a city, service, or institution, attracts a population that uses its services and economic opportunities. Catchment areas may be defined based on from where people are naturally drawn to a location (for example, a labour catchment area) or as established by governments or organizations such as education authorities or healthcare providers, for the provision of services.

Governments and community service organizations often define catchment areas for planning purposes and public safety such as ensuring universal access to services like fire departments, police departments, ambulance bases and hospitals. In business, a catchment area is used to describe the influence from which a retail location draws its customers. Airport catchment areas can inform efforts to estimate route profitability. A health catchment area is of importance in public health, and healthcare planning, as it helps in resource allocation, service delivery, and accessibility assessment.

== Types of catchment areas ==
A catchment area can be defined relative to a location, and based upon a number of factors, including distance, travel time, geographic boundaries or population within the catchment.

Catchment areas generally fall under two categories, those that occur organically, i.e., "de facto" catchment area, and a place people are naturally drawn to, such as a large shopping centre. A catchment area in terms of a place people are drawn to could be a city, service or institution.

Catchment area boundaries can be modeled using geographic information systems (GIS). There can be large variability in the services provided within different catchment areas in the same region depending upon how and when those catchments were established. They are usually contiguous but can overlap when they describe competing services. For example, the boundaries of catchment areas can also vary by travel time, whereby 1-hour is indicative of daily commuting time and a 3-hour cut-off reflecting essential, but less frequent services.

=== Defining ===
==== Identification of "de facto" catchment areas ====
GIS technology has allowed for the modeling of catchment areas, and in particular those relating to urban areas. Based on travel time between rural areas and cities of different sizes, the urban–rural catchment areas (URCAs) is a global GIS dataset that allows for comparison across countries, such as the distribution of population along the rural–urban continuum. Functional economic areas (FEAs), also called larger urban zone or functional urban areas, are catchment areas of commuters or commuting zones. A limitation of the URCA and FEA is that the models link locations to a single urban center of reference, even though there may be multiple centers of reference for varying activities.

==== Establishment of catchment areas for specific services ====
Catchment areas may be established for the provision of services. For example, a school catchment area is the geographic area from which students are eligible to attend a local school. When a facility's capacity can only service a specific volume, the catchment may be used to limit a population's ability to access services outside that area. In the case of a school catchment area, children may be unable to enroll in a school outside their catchment to prevent the school's services being exceeded.

GIS can also inform for the establishment of health care or hospital catchment areas. Such catchment areas can also define the epidemiological disease burdens or forecast hospital needs amid a disease outbreak. They are used to evaluate population health outcomes, especially for diseases like cancer and chronic conditions. Understanding the catchment area helps health systems optimize service coverage, measure healthcare utilization, and identify underserved regions.

Health catchment areas are often employed in research to study the relationship between geographical factors and healthcare outcomes. For example, they are used in cancer research to understand the distribution of cases and ensure that healthcare resources are equitably distributed. They are also used in epidemiological studies to assess the reach and impact of healthcare interventions. One challenge in defining catchment areas is that they may not accurately reflect patient behavior or health-seeking patterns, particularly in areas where patients have access to multiple health facilities.

==== Defining city–regions based on overlapping catchment areas ====
Overlapping catchment areas can be used to determine city–regions, reflecting the interconnectedness of urban centers. The Nature Cities article "Worldwide Delineation of Multi-Tier City–Regions" maps the catchment areas of urban centers across four tiers—town, small, intermediate, and large city—based on travel time using a global travel friction grid, acknowledging that individuals may rely on multiple centers for various needs, with larger centers offering a wider range of activities. The dataset, classifying over 30,000 urban centers into the four tiers, is publicly available.

== Examples ==
- Airports can be built and maintained in locations which minimize the driving distance for the surrounding population to reach them.
- A neighborhood or district of a city often has several small convenience shops, each with a catchment area of several streets. Supermarkets, on the other hand, have a much lower density, with catchment areas of several neighborhoods (or several villages in rural areas). This principle, similar to the central place theory, makes catchment areas an important area of study for geographers, economists, and urban planners.
- In order to compensate for income inequalities, distances, variations in secondary educational level, and other similar factors, a nation may structure its higher education catchment areas to ensure a good mixture of students from different backgrounds.
- School catchment areas are a simple method of assigning children to schools. They have been described by the Organisation for Economic Co-operation and Development as "an important tool in the governance of the school network and student assignment". Authorities can adjust them as needed or in line with social policies, such as aiming to increase diversity. Catchment areas can reflect geographical inequality or segregation.
- Hong Kong divides its primary schools into School Nets under its Primary One Admission System, functioning as catchment areas for allocation of school places.
- To inform prospective employers, transport providers, planners and local authorities, data detailing the travel to work patterns of seven towns in the Western Region of Ireland were used to define each towns' labour catchments.
- Comparative Analysis of Urban Catchment Areas in European Capitals.

== See also ==
- City region
- Hinterland
- Rural-urban commuting area
- School district
- Urban planning
