= Commuting zone =

A commuting zone is a geographic area used in population and economic analysis. In addition to the major use of urban areas, it may be used to define rural areas which share a common market.

According to the Economic Research Service of the United States Department of Agriculture:

The geographic areas of non-metro America exhibit a great deal of variation in economic and social characteristics. In addition to agricultural areas, non-metro America includes sparsely populated mountainous regions, millions of acres of heavily forested areas, small towns, light manufacturing areas, tiny coastal hamlets, and the suburban fringes of growing metro areas. What we know about this heterogeneity is based largely on data for counties. This means that our understanding of non-metro diversity comes from data on arbitrary political units.

Commuting zones (CZ's) and labor market areas (LMA's) were developed because county boundaries are not adequate confines for an area's economy. A local economy and its labor market are bounded not by the nearest county line, but by interrelationships between buyers and sellers of labor. If we are to understand the diversity of non-metro America we need a geographic standard capturing variations in local economic and labor force activities. The central objective of CZ's and LMA's was to develop such a geographic unit that better captures the economic and social diversity of non-metro areas.

For 1990, 741 commuting zones were delineated for all U.S. counties and county equivalents. These commuting zones were developed without regard to a minimum population threshold and are intended to be a spatial measure of the local labor market. Where necessary, the commuting zones were aggregated into 394 labor market areas that met the Bureau of the Census criterion of a 100,000 population minimum. This was done to acquire a special 1990 Census Public Use Microdata Sample (PUMS-L) that identifies labor market areas in which individuals work. The commuting zones and labor market areas were also classified by the population of the largest city within each of them.

In 2000, there were 709 commuting zones delineated for the U.S. using the same methodology as was used in the previous decades. Labor market areas were not estimated for 2000, because many researchers found them to be too large and not as useful as the commuting zones.

== See also ==
- Commuter town
- Daily urban system
- Rural-urban commuting area
- Travel to work area

== External links and further reading ==
- "Labor Market areas for the United States"
- "U.S Commuting Zones and Labor Market Areas: A 1990 Update"
