= Daily urban system =

The daily urban system (DUS) refers to the area around a city, in which daily commuting occurs. It is a means for defining an urban region by including the areas from which individuals commute. Daily Urban System is a concept first introduced by American geographer Berry, and then introduced into Europe by British geographer Hall.

== Definition ==
Daily urban system (DUS) mainly focuses on urban cities, where majority of the commuting flow takes place. However, some case studies do look at the outskirts and suburban areas around specific urban cities that are being studied. The daily commuting includes both work and leisure, contributing to high density in the daily urban system. That results in slowing the speed of transportation. The speed of transportation is about 16 km/h at the central parts of urban cities, but speed may vary from place to place.

Urban sprawl is the possible outcome of an expansion of the daily urban system. Therefore, it includes multiple local governments, economies, and demographics. The researchers that study daily urban system (DUS) are basically focusing on the transportation planning. Some are interested in micro-analysis of an urban area per se, some carry out macro analysis of a region that is made up of several urban cities.

The difference between an agglomeration of an urban area and the daily urban system is that, an agglomeration is a multivariate means of combining townships, counties, and other defined areas. It looks at shared economic relationships and other factors. A daily urban system, on the other hand, only shows how far away people who commute into a city are living. It shows how much sprawl has occurred, or how people are living far away from where they commute to everyday due to differences in conditions between the regions.

== Cases ==
=== Olomouc, Czechia ===
A study in Olomouc research on the traveling distance among locations such as schools, hospitals, retail stores, and culture and sports centers of the region, and the towns in the hinterland of Olomouc too. The findings were different for the region and towns. The towns had shown reduction in traveling distance for commercial services, such as pharmacies and banking services. There were groceries and retail shops moving to large commercial centers too, cutting down traveling distance, which people were able to shop at the malls without having to travel much. However, the study found little changes region wise, especially in health care and education sectors. Commute for schools and health care institutions had remained stable.

=== Randstad area, Netherlands ===
Researchers looked into the daily urban systems within Randstad to determine if the megalopolis is considered a network city. Commute within Randstad remained loose despite the rising proportions of the population commuting to work over a decade (1992 to 2002). Many residents from the suburban areas were still commuting to work at the urban areas - large daily urban system - every day after ten years due to low job growth. Randstad was not considered as a network city because of its negative commuting balance, where large proportion of residents had to commute to large daily urban system for work.

=== Paris, France ===
Paris' central urban population is 2,125,246. Its agglomerated population is 9,644,507. That's a big difference. Roughly 7 million people live outside of Paris proper, but are easily within the greater Parisian area. Paris's daily urban system has a population of 11,174,743. That's 1.5 million people living outside of what can (at the most generous) be called Paris, and yet are commuting there every day. 10% of the city lives far enough away that they cannot really say they 'live outside of Paris,' but commute there daily.

== See also ==
- 15-minute city
- Commuter town
- Commuting zone
- Exurb
- Isochrone map
- Transit desert
- Travel to work area
- Urban Employment Area
