= Commuter town =

Urban community from which most of the workforce commutes out

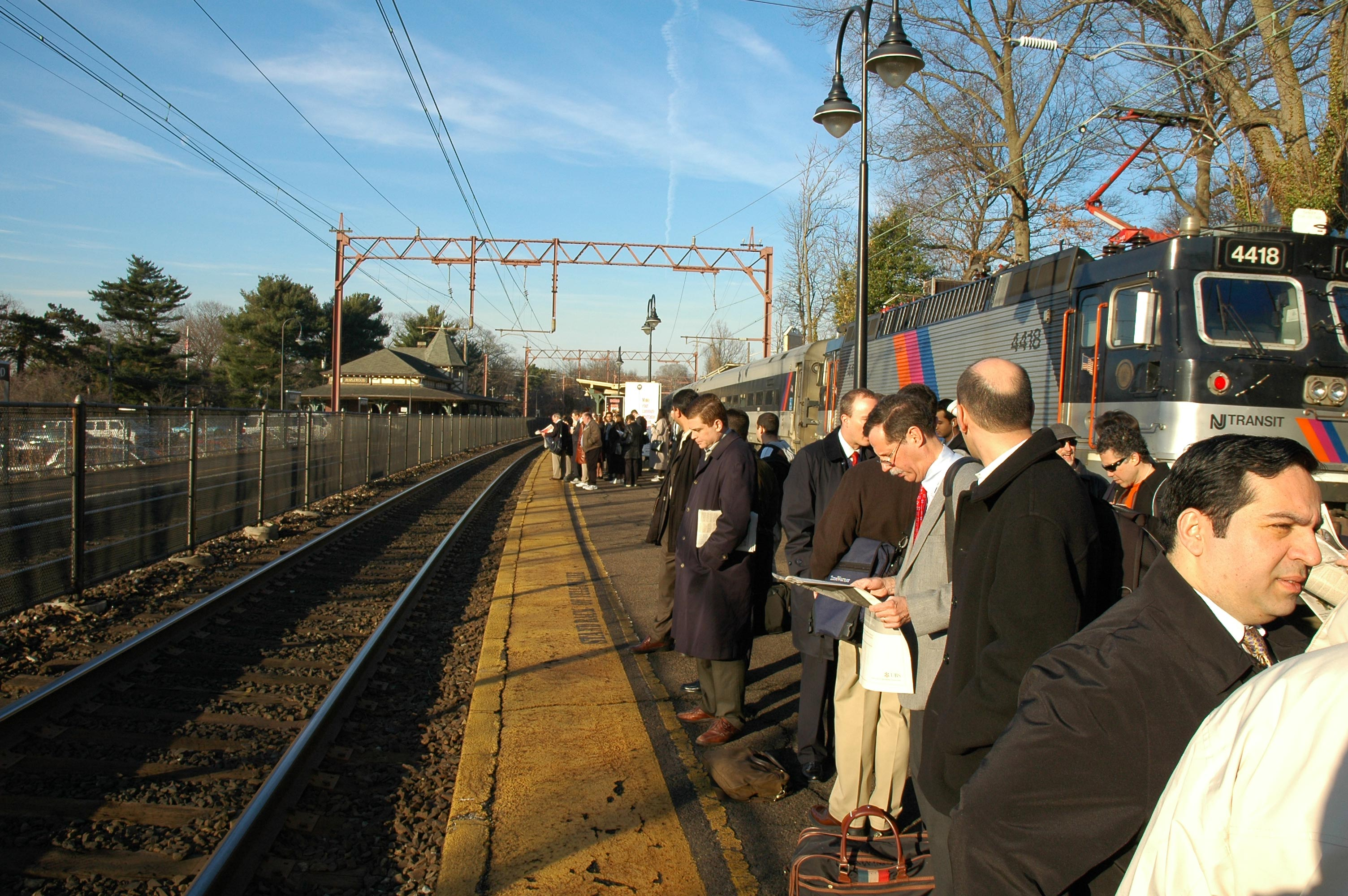
Many municipalities in the US state of New Jersey can be considered commuter towns. Here, riders wait in Maplewood for a train bound for New York City during the morning rush hour.

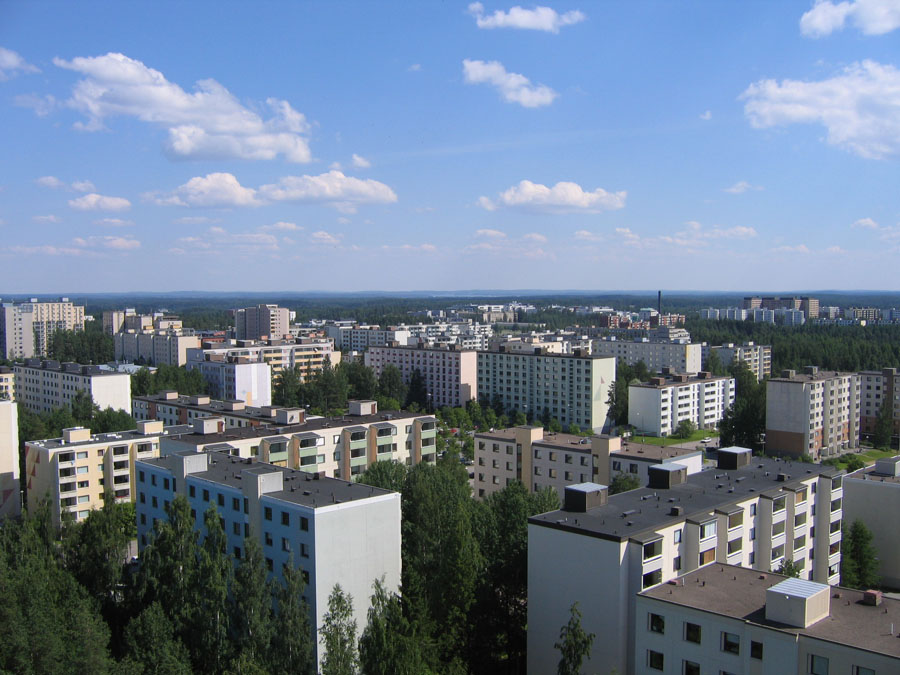
Hervanta in Tampere, Finland, is mostly known for its residential tower blocks, but there are also some commercial services, a university campus and several high-tech companies.

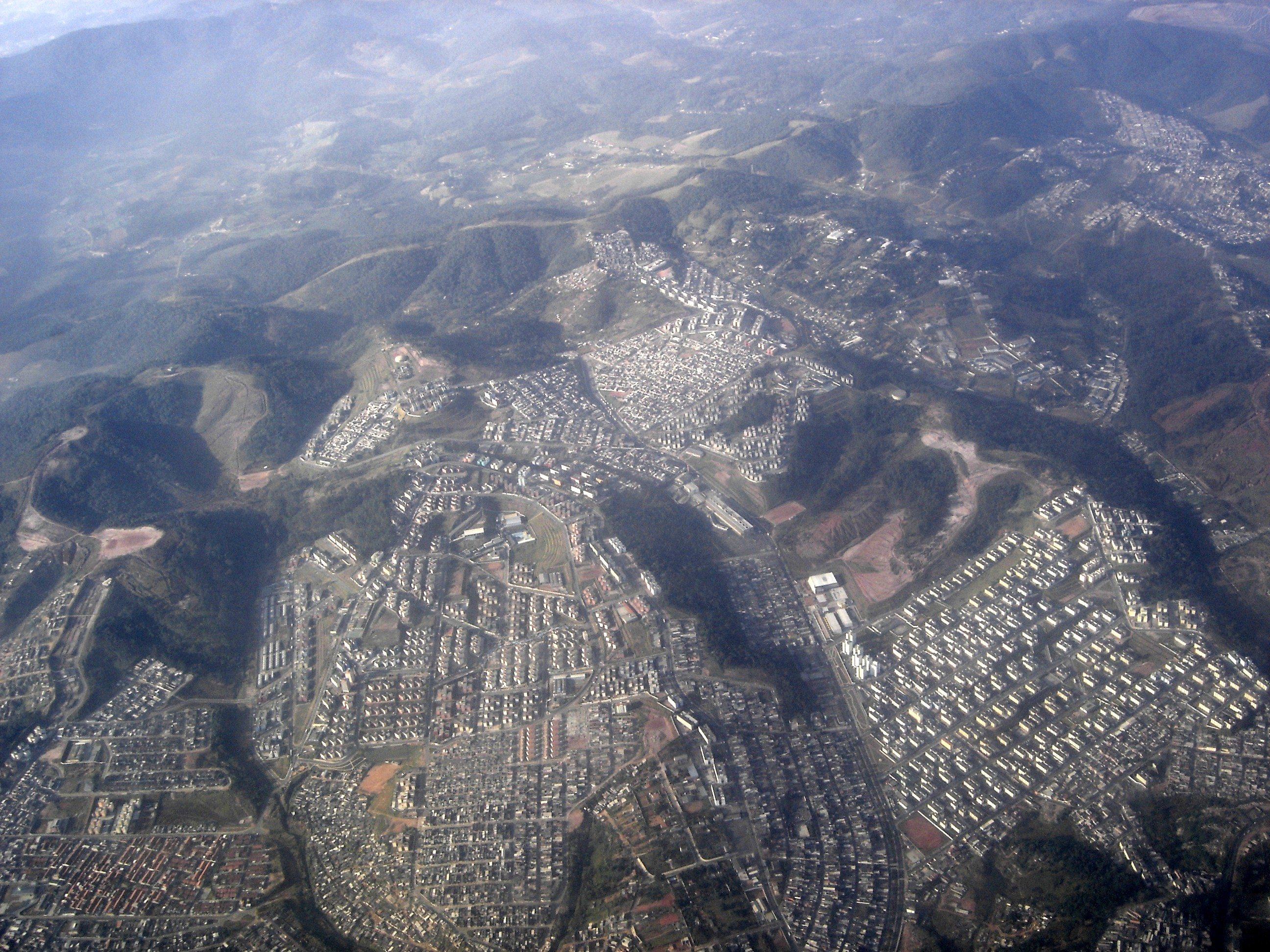
Cidade Tiradentes is a heavily populated area in the outskirts of São Paulo consisting mainly of public housing projects. On average, its inhabitants spend 2 hours and 45 minutes a day commuting between home and work.

A commuter town is a populated area that is primarily residential rather than commercial or industrial. Routine travel from home to work and back is called commuting, which is where the term comes from. A commuter town may be called by many other terms: "bedroom community" (Canada and northeastern US), "bedroom town", "bedroom suburb" (US), "dormitory town" (UK). The term "exurb" was used from the 1950s, but since 2006, is generally used for areas beyond suburbs and specifically areas less densely built than the suburbs to which the residents of exurbs commute.

== Causes ==
Commuter towns may form when workers in a region cannot afford to live where they work and must seek residency in another town with a lower cost of living. The late 20th century, the dot-com bubble and United States housing bubble drove housing costs in Californian metropolitan areas to historic highs, spawning exurban growth in adjacent counties. Workers with jobs in San Francisco found themselves moving further and further away to nearby cities like Oakland, Burlingame, and San Mateo. As rental and housing costs kept increasing, even renters that would normally be considered affluent elsewhere would struggle with the prospect of home ownership in an area with higher quality schools and amenities. As of 2003, over 80% of the workforce of Tracy, California, was employed in the San Francisco Bay Area.

Other commuter towns are formed with the intention of the municipality focusing on residential areas and limiting commercial development, to attract families who want to establish long-term communities and/or minimize perceived problems with commercial development. Atherton, California is one such example.

In some cases, commuter towns can result from changing economic conditions. Steubenville, Ohio along with neighboring Weirton, West Virginia had an independent regional identity until the collapse of the steel industry in the 1980s. Steubenville Pike and the Parkway West also created easier access to the much larger city of Pittsburgh. In 2013, Jefferson County, Ohio (where Steubenville is located) was added to the Pittsburgh metropolitan area as part of its larger Combined Statistical Area.

In Japan, most of the national railway network was privatized by the 1980s but unlike in the UK, both the national railway's tracks, trains, stations and real estate were included in the privatization agreements. Japan's privately operated railroads view real estate investment and development of commuter towns as central to their business model. These railroads continuously develop new residential and commercial areas alongside their existing and new routes and stations and adjust their train schedules in order to provide existing and prospective commuters with convenient work-commute routines. This is quite different from North American commuter towns which are almost exclusively the result of transportation by car.

== Effects ==
Where commuters are wealthier and small town housing markets are weaker than city housing markets, the development of a bedroom community may raise local housing prices and attract upscale service businesses in a process akin to gentrification. Long-time residents may be displaced by new commuter residents due to rising house prices. This can also be influenced by zoning restrictions in urbanized areas that prevent the construction of suitably cheap housing closer to places of employment.

The number of commuter towns increased in the US and the UK during the 20th century because of a trend for people to move out of the cities into the surrounding green belt. In the United States, it is common for commuter towns to create disparities in municipal tax rates. When a commuter town collects few business taxes, residents must pay the brunt of the public operating budget in higher property or income taxes. Such municipalities may scramble to encourage commercial growth once an established residential base has been reached.

In the UK, commuter towns were developed by railway companies to create demand for their lines. One 1920s pioneer of this form of development was the Metropolitan Railway (now part of London Underground) which marketed its Metro-land developments. This initiative encouraged many to move out of central and inner-city London to suburbs such as Harrow, or out of London itself, to commuter villages in Buckinghamshire or Hertfordshire. Commuter towns have more recently been built ahead of adequate transportation infrastructure, thus spurring the development of roads and public transportation systems. These can take the form of light rail lines extending from the city center to new streetcar suburbs and new or expanded highways, whose construction and traffic can lead to the community becoming part of a larger conurbation.

A 2014 study by the British Office for National Statistics found that commuting also affects wellbeing. Commuters are more likely to be anxious, dissatisfied and have the sense that their daily activities lack meaning than those who don't have to travel to work, even if they are paid more.

== Exurb ==
The term exurb (a portmanteau of "extra & urban") was coined by Auguste Comte Spectorsky in his 1955 book The Exurbanites, to describe the ring of prosperous communities beyond the suburbs that are commuter towns for an urban area. However, since a landmark report by the Brookings Institution in 2006, the term is generally used for areas beyond suburbs and specifically less densely built than the suburbs to which the exurbs' residents commute.

Comparatively low density towns – often featuring large lots and large homes – create heavy motor vehicle dependency.

"They begin as embryonic subdivisions of a few hundred homes at the far edge of beyond, surrounded by scrub. Then, they grow – first gradually, but soon with explosive force – attracting stores, creating jobs and struggling to keep pace with the need for more schools, more roads, more everything. And eventually, when no more land is available and home prices have skyrocketed, the whole cycle starts again, another 15 minutes down the turnpike."

— Rick Lyman, The New York Times

Others argue that exurban environments, such as those that have emerged in Oregon over the last 40 years as a result of the state's unique land use laws, have helped to protect local agriculture and local businesses by creating strict urban growth boundaries that encourage greater population densities in centralized towns, while slowing or greatly reducing urban and suburban sprawl into agricultural, timber land, and natural areas.

== See also ==
- Automotive city
- Daily urban system
- Edge city
- Garden city movement
- Railway town
- Satellite city
- Transit-oriented development
- Transit-proximate development
- Transit village
- Travel to work area
- Urban sprawl
