= Exurb =

Area of lower population density than suburbs

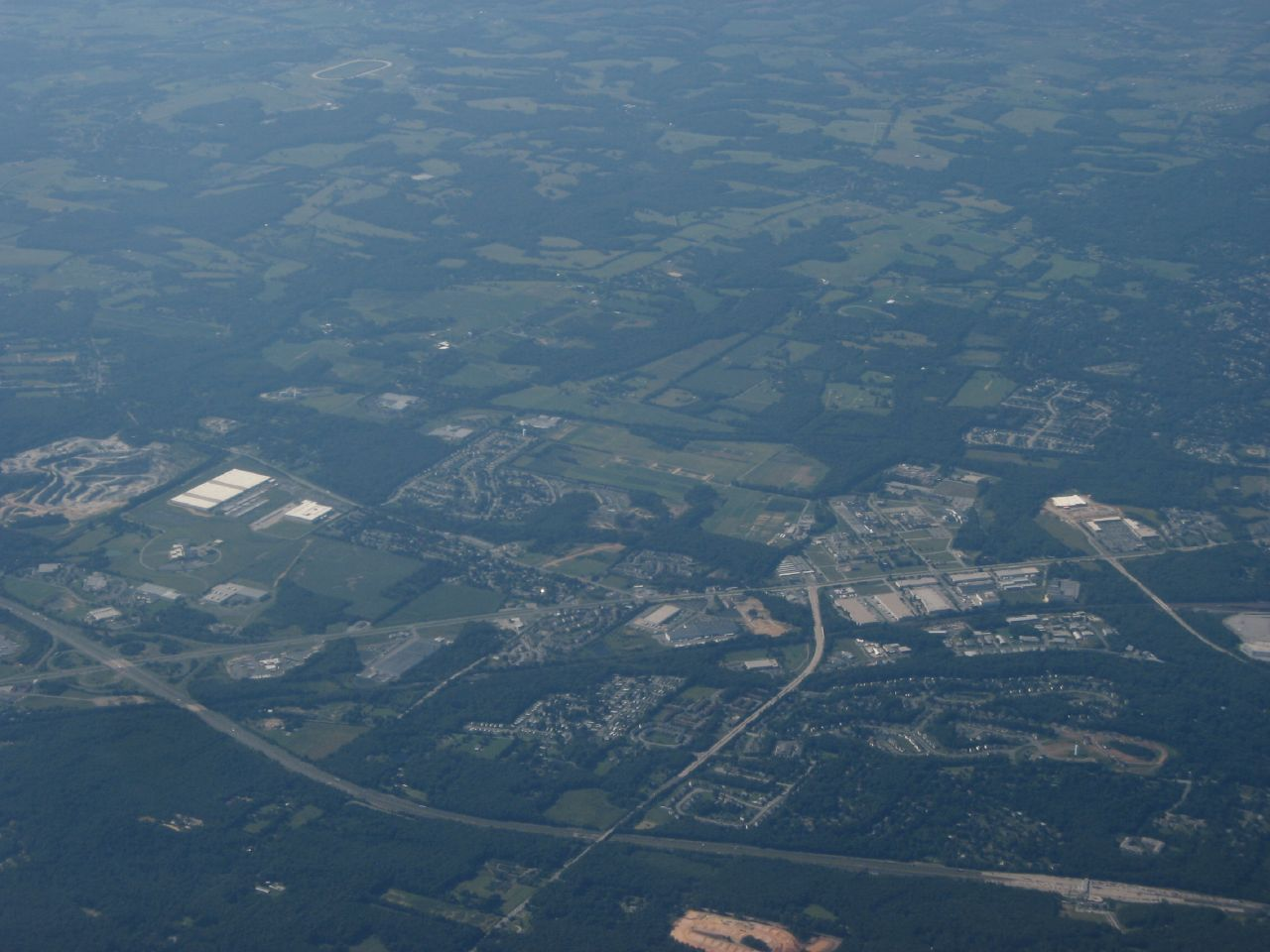
Exurban-style density along the Delaware–Maryland–Pennsylvania border, part of the Philadelphia metropolitan area

Exurban development (left side) blends into suburban development (right side) in Loudoun County, Virginia, in the western part of the Baltimore–Washington metropolitan area.

An exurb (or exurban area), is an urbanized area outside the inner suburban areas of a city, located at the edge of a metropolitan area. It is sometimes called a semi-rural area or subrural area. An exurb has some of the same economic and commuting connections to the metropolitan area as a typical suburb, but with lower commercial density and higher population growth.

An exurb shapes an interface between urban and rural landscapes, holding a limited urban nature for its functional, economic, and social interaction with the urban center, due to its dominant residential character. Exurbs consist of "agglomerations of housing and jobs outside the municipal boundaries of a primary city" and beyond the surrounding suburbs.

== Definitions ==
The word exurb (a portmanteau of extra (outside) and urban) was coined by Auguste Comte Spectorsky, in his 1955 book The Exurbanites, to describe the ring of prosperous communities beyond the suburbs, that are commuter towns for an urban area. In other uses, the term has expanded to include popular extraurban districts which nonetheless may have poor transportation and underdeveloped economies due to their distance from the urban center.

Exurbs can be defined in terms of population density across the extended urban area. The mixture of urban and rural environments raises ecological issues.

== Examples by country ==
=== China ===
- Changping District, Beijing
- Shunyi District, Beijing
- Shenjia village, Loudi city, Hunan province

=== Russia ===
- Rublyovka, Moscow

=== United States ===
Since the Finding Exurbia report by the Brookings Institution in 2006, the term is generally used for areas beyond suburbs and specifically less densely built and populated than typical suburbs to which the exurbs' residents commute. To qualify as exurban, a census tract must meet three criteria:

1. Economic connection to a large metropolis.
2. Low housing density: bottom third of census tracts with regard to housing density. In 2000, this was a minimum of 2.6 acres (1.1 hectares) per resident.
3. Population growth exceeding the average for its central metropolitan area.

These are based on published datasets. Alternative approaches include working with Oak Ridge National Laboratory LandScan data and GIS.

Exurban areas incorporate a mix of rural development (e.g., farms and open space) and in places, suburban-style development (e.g., tracts of single-family homes, though usually on large lots). In long-settled areas, such as the U.S. Northeast megalopolis, exurban areas incorporate pre-existing towns, villages and smaller cities, as well as strips of older single-family homes built along pre-existing roads that connected the older population centers of what was once a rural area. The Brookings Institution listed exurban counties, defined as having at least 20% of their residents in exurban census tract.

== See also ==
- Bedroom town
- Rural–urban commuting area
- Rural–urban fringe
- White flight
