= Primary One Admission System =

School admissions system in Hong Kong

- Traditional Chinese: 小一入學統籌辦法
- Simplified Chinese: 小一入学统筹办法
Transcriptions
Standard Mandarin
- Hanyu Pinyin: Xiǎo Yī Rùxué Tǒngchóu Bànfǎ
Yue: Cantonese
- Jyutping: siu2 jat1 jap6 hok6 tung2 cau4 baan6 faat3

The top image for the Hong Kong education series is based on the Hong Kong series template created by zh::en:user:Mcyjerry and was created by zh:user:tonync.

Primary One Admission System (Chinese: 小一入學統籌辦法; Jyutping: siu2 jat1 jap6 hok6 tung2 cau4 baan6 faat3) is the admissions system for public and government-funded primary schools in Hong Kong. The system is administered by the Education Bureau. The system divides available school places into Discretionary Places and places for central allocation. Schools are divided into 36 school nets for central allocation.

== System ==
Two types of primary schools in Hong Kong, government schools and aided schools, are offered to children without charge. Government schools are directly managed by the Education Bureau (EDB), and are all coeducational and secular. Aided schools are operated by nonprofit organisations with most of their expenses borne by the government, but are managed by their own school boards.

Each government or aided school assigns 50% of their Primary 1 places as "Discretionary Places" which can be offered to prospective students at the discretion of each school, while the other half are reserved for central allocation. All parents who intend to send their child to a public primary school in Hong Kong are required to participate in the POA System. Parents must obtain an application form and indicate whether they have a preference for any particular school. Parents may opt to apply for a Discretionary Place at one single school of their choice directly; the school does not have to be located in the same school net as the child's residential address. Parents who have no preference, or who failed to obtain a Discretionary Place, are allocated a school place during the Central Allocation stage.

=== Discretionary Places ===
Discretionary Places are split into two categories. Of the Discretionary Places (which comprise 50% of all places offered), up to 30% (out of 50%) are reserved for applicant children whose siblings study at a particular school or whose parents work there at the time of application, with the remaining 20% or more reserved for points-based admission. Schools are required to admit students in the first category. If the number of applicants who are siblings exceed 30% of places available, the remaining applicants will take up places reserved for central allocation, reducing the places available in the second round. In 2020, a number of popular primary schools had to reduce their number of places for central allocation as a result.

The points-based system for the remaining places involves multiple criteria for calculating points. These include whether the child applicant's parents or siblings work or study at secondary schools or kindergartens affiliated with the primary school applied to, affiliation to the same religion or organisation as the primary school, and age. Schools are not allowed to conduct tests or interviews on the applicant's acquired knowledge.

=== Central allocation ===
Children who did not receive any offers in the Discretionary Places stage obtain a place in the Central Allocation stage. The Central Allocation stage is divided into two parts. In the first part, parents may choose up to three schools in any school net; however, of the places which remain available for central allocation, only 10% are reserved for allocation in the first part. In the second part, parents may rank schools within the school net they reside in by order of preference, and the remaining 90% of seats are allocated in this part. School places are allocated randomly by computer.

For children who reside in mainland China or Macau and commute to school into Hong Kong daily, the EDB reserved a list of schools for such applicants, which are located close to border crossings. In 2020, 120 schools participated in this scheme and accept cross-border students.

=== School nets ===
The POA System divides schools in the territory into catchment areas known as school nets. As of 2020, Hong Kong is divided into 36 school nets. Of the 36 nets, nets 34 and 41 in Kowloon and 11 and 12 in Hong Kong Island are considered the most prestigious with the best schools. Many parents who can afford housing in these districts move into them in order to increase the chances their children can secure a place at these schools.

The EDB has sometimes been criticised for failing to distribute school places appropriately between different school nets. In 2010, the supply of school places greatly exceeded demand in net 46 in Kwun Tong District, while demand exceeded supply in net 48 in the same district. This led to around 170 school places in net 46 being distributed to students residing in net 48, which may require these students to travel further to school.
