= Housing Market Area =

In the United Kingdom a Housing Market Area (HMA) is a statistical area that observes housing of demand. These patterns are influenced by commuting patterns, internal migration and house prices. HMAs reflect the fact that people may live in one local authority area but commute to another.

== See also ==
- Travel to work area
