= Travel to work area =

Statistical region used by the UK Government

Travel to work areas in the United Kingdom

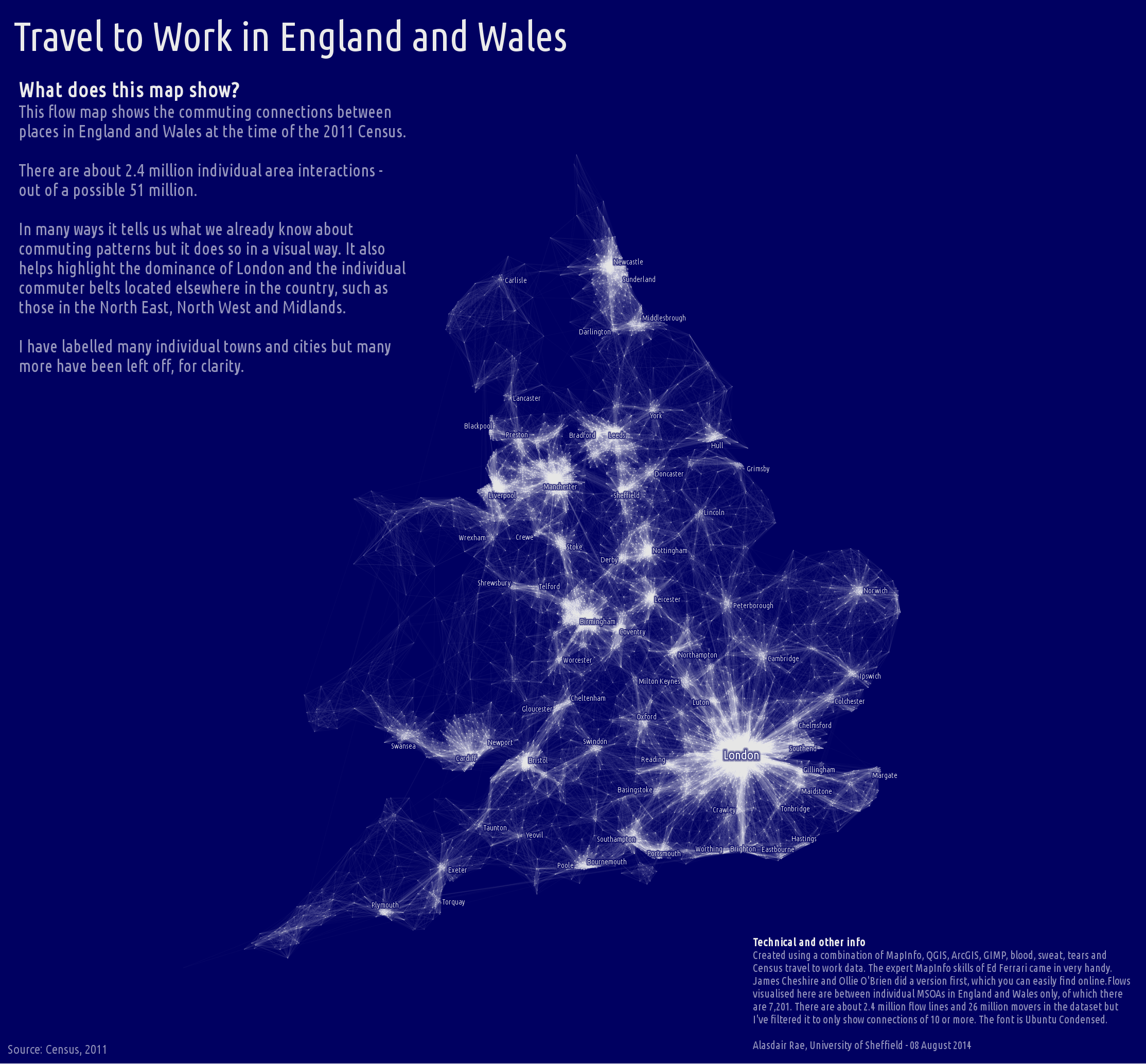
TTW Flow Map 2011 for England and Wales

A travel to work area (TTWA) is a statistical tool used by UK Government agencies and local authorities, especially by the Department for Work and Pensions and Jobcentres, to indicate an area where the population would generally commute to a larger town, city or conurbation for the purposes of employment.

== Significance ==
Map of the London TTW area (red) showing the main road and rail links into the city

As a measure based on urban areas and their commuter hinterland they are a form of metropolitan area, though as methods of calculation differ they cannot directly be compared with other specific measurements such as metropolitan statistical areas in the United States.

TTWAs have no legal status. However, they give planners and geographers an alternate view of urban life as their boundaries are tied not to arbitrary administrative limits but socio-economic ties. Having an idea of where people commute from for work is particularly useful for public transport planning.

== Definition ==
Travel to work areas are defined by the Office for National Statistics using census data for commuting between wards, based on the different locations of individuals' home and work addresses.

A travel to work area is a collection of wards for which "of the resident economically active population, at least 75% actually work in the area, and also, that of everyone working in the area, at least 75% actually live in the area". This definition does not produce a unique set of region boundaries. The algorithm was developed by Newcastle University, with the following guidelines: Maximise the number of TTWAs and reduce the size of the largest TTWAs. According to these measures, there were 243 TTWAs within the United Kingdom in 2007.

=== 2007 ===
The 243 TTWAs were:

- Aberdeen
- Aberystwyth & Lampeter
- Andover
- Ashford
- Ayr & Kilmarnock
- Badenoch
- Ballymena
- Banbury
- Banff
- Bangor, Caernarfon & Llangefni
- Barnsley
- Barnstaple
- Barrow-in-Furness
- Basingstoke
- Bath
- Bedford
- Belfast
- Berwick
- Bideford
- Birmingham
- Bishop Auckland & Barnard Castle
- Blackburn
- Blackpool
- Bolton
- Boston
- Bournemouth
- Bradford
- Brecon
- Bridgend
- Bridgwater
- Bridlington & Driffield
- Bridport & Lyme Regis
- Brighton
- Bristol
- Bude & Holsworthy
- Burnley, Nelson & Colne
- Burton upon Trent
- Bury St Edmunds
- Buxton
- Calderdale
- Cambridge
- Campbeltown
- Canterbury
- Cardiff
- Cardigan
- Carlisle
- Carmarthen & Llandovery
- Chelmsford & Braintree
- Cheltenham & Evesham
- Chester & Flint
- Chesterfield
- Chichester & Bognor Regis
- Clacton
- Colchester
- Coleraine
- Coventry
- Craigavon
- Craven
- Crawley
- Crewe & Northwich
- Cromer & Sheringham
- Darlington
- Derby
- Derry
- Dolgellau & Barmouth
- Doncaster
- Dorchester & Weymouth
- Dornoch & Lairg
- Dover
- Dudley & Sandwell
- Dumbarton
- Dumfries & Annan
- Dundee
- Dunfermline
- Dungannon
- Dunoon & Bute
- Eastbourne
- Ebbw Vale & Abergavenny
- Edinburgh
- Eilean Siar
- Enniskillen
- Exeter & Newton Abbot
- Falkirk
- Falmouth & Helston
- Folkestone
- Forfar & Montrose
- Fraserburgh
- Galashiels & Peebles
- Glasgow
- Gloucester
- Grantham
- Great Yarmouth
- Greenock
- Grimsby
- Guildford & Aldershot
- Harlow & Bishop's Stortford
- Harrogate & Ripon
- Hartlepool
- Hastings
- Haverfordwest & Fishguard
- Hawes & Leyburn
- Hawick
- Hereford & Leominster
- Hexham & Haltwhistle
- Holyhead
- Honiton & Axminster
- Huddersfield
- Hull
- Huntingdon
- Invergordon
- Inverness & Dingwall
- Ipswich
- Irvine & Arran
- Isle of Wight
- Kelso & Jedburgh
- Kendal
- Kettering & Corby
- Kidderminster
- King's Lynn & Fakenham
- Kingsbridge & Dartmouth
- Kirkcaldy & Glenrothes
- Kirkcudbright
- Lanarkshire
- Lancaster & Morecambe
- Launceston
- Leeds
- Leicester
- Lincoln
- Liverpool
- Livingston & Bathgate
- Llandrindod Wells & Builth Wells
- Llandudno & Colwyn Bay
- Lochaber
- Lochgilphead
- London
- Louth & Horncastle
- Lowestoft & Beccles
- Ludlow
- Luton & Watford
- Machynlleth & Tywyn
- Maidstone & North Kent
- Malton & Pickering
- Manchester
- Mansfield
- Margate, Ramsgate & Sandwich
- Matlock
- Merthyr Tydfil & Aberdare
- Middlesbrough & Stockton
- Mid Ulster
- Milton Keynes & Aylesbury
- Minehead
- Monmouth & Cinderford
- Moray
- Morpeth, Ashington & Alnwick
- Mull & Islay
- Newbury
- Newcastle & Durham
- Newport & Cwmbran
- Newry
- Newton Stewart & Wigtown
- Newtown & Welshpool
- Northallerton & Thirsk
- Northampton & Wellingborough
- Norwich
- Nottingham
- Oban
- Okehampton
- Omagh
- Orkney Islands
- Oswestry
- Oxford
- Paignton & Totnes
- Pembroke & Tenby
- Penrith & Appleby
- Penzance & Isles of Scilly
- Perth & Blairgowrie
- Peterborough
- Peterhead
- Pitlochry
- Plymouth
- Poole
- Porthmadog & Ffestiniog
- Portsmouth
- Preston
- Pwllheli
- Reading & Bracknell
- Rhyl & Denbigh
- Richmond & Catterick
- Rochdale & Oldham
- Rugby
- Salisbury
- Scarborough
- Scunthorpe
- Shaftesbury & Blandford Forum
- Sheffield & Rotherham
- Shetland Islands
- Shrewsbury
- Skegness
- Skye & Lochalsh
- South Holland
- Southampton
- Southend & Brentwood
- St Andrews & Cupar
- St Austell
- Stafford
- Stevenage
- Stirling & Alloa
- Stoke-on-Trent
- Strabane
- Stranraer
- Sunderland
- Swansea Bay
- Swindon
- Taunton
- Telford & Bridgnorth
- Thetford & Mildenhall
- Thurso
- Tiverton
- Torquay
- Trowbridge & Warminster
- Truro, Redruth & Camborne
- Tunbridge Wells
- Ullapool & Gairloch
- Wadebridge
- Wakefield & Castleford
- Walsall & Cannock
- Warrington & Wigan
- Warwick & Stratford-upon-Avon
- Wells & Shepton Mallet
- Whitby
- Whitehaven
- Wick
- Wirral & Ellesmere Port
- Wisbech
- Wolverhampton
- Worcester & Malvern
- Workington & Keswick
- Worksop & Retford
- Worthing
- Wrexham & Whitchurch
- Wycombe & Slough
- Yeovil & Chard
- York

=== 2011 ===
The TTWAs were recalculated from 2011 census data. There are now 228 areas as follows:

- Aberdeen
- Aberystwyth
- Alness and Invergordon
- Andover
- Arbroath and Montrose
- Ashford
- Aviemore and Grantown-on-Spey
- Ayr
- Ballymena
- Banbury
- Bangor and Holyhead
- Barnsley
- Barnstaple
- Barrow-in-Furness
- Basingstoke
- Bath
- Bedford
- Belfast
- Berwick
- Bideford
- Birkenhead
- Birmingham
- Blackburn
- Blackpool
- Blandford Forum and Gillingham
- Blyth and Ashington
- Boston
- Bournemouth
- Bradford
- Brecon
- Bridgend
- Bridgwater
- Bridlington
- Bridport
- Brighton
- Bristol
- Broadford and Kyle of Lochalsh
- Bude
- Burnley
- Burton upon Trent
- Bury St Edmunds
- Buxton
- Cambridge
- Campbeltown
- Canterbury
- Cardiff
- Cardigan
- Carlisle
- Chelmsford
- Cheltenham
- Chester
- Chesterfield
- Chichester and Bognor Regis
- Cinderford and Ross-on-Wye
- Clacton
- Colchester
- Coleraine
- Colwyn Bay
- Cookstown and Magherafelt
- Corby
- Coventry
- Craigavon
- Crawley
- Crewe
- Cromer and Sheringham
- Dalbeattie and Castle Douglas
- Darlington
- Derby
- Derry
- Doncaster
- Dorchester and Weymouth
- Dudley
- Dumbarton and Helensburgh
- Dumfries
- Dundee
- Dunfermline and Kirkcaldy
- Dungannon
- Dunoon and Rothesay
- Durham and Bishop Auckland
- Eastbourne
- Edinburgh
- Elgin
- Enniskillen
- Evesham
- Exeter
- Falkirk and Stirling
- Falmouth
- Folkestone and Dover
- Fort William
- Fraserburgh
- Galashiels and Peebles
- Girvan
- Glasgow
- Gloucester
- Golspie and Brora
- Grantham
- Great Yarmouth
- Greenock
- Grimsby
- Guildford and Aldershot
- Halifax
- Harrogate
- Hartlepool
- Hastings
- Haverfordwest and Milford Haven
- Hawick and Kelso
- Hereford
- Hexham
- High Wycombe and Aylesbury
- Huddersfield
- Hull
- Huntingdon
- Inverness
- Ipswich
- Isle of Wight
- Kendal
- Kettering and Wellingborough
- Kilmarnock and Irvine
- King's Lynn
- Kingsbridge and Dartmouth
- Lancaster and Morecambe
- Launceston
- Leamington Spa
- Leeds
- Leicester
- Lincoln
- Liskeard
- Liverpool
- Livingston
- Llandrindod Wells and Builth Wells
- Llanelli
- Lochgilphead
- London
- Lowestoft
- Ludlow
- Luton
- Malton
- Manchester
- Mansfield
- Margate and Ramsgate
- Medway
- Merthyr Tydfil
- Middlesbrough and Stockton
- Milton Keynes
- Minehead
- Motherwell and Airdrie
- Mull and Islay
- Newbury
- Newcastle
- Newport
- Newry and Banbridge
- Newton Stewart
- Newtown and Welshpool
- Northallerton
- Northampton
- Norwich
- Nottingham
- Oban
- Omagh and Strabane
- Orkney Islands
- Oswestry
- Oxford
- Pembroke and Tenby
- Penrith
- Penzance
- Perth
- Peterborough
- Peterhead
- Pitlochry and Aberfeldy
- Plymouth
- Poole
- Portree
- Portsmouth
- Preston
- Pwllheli and Porthmadog
- Reading
- Redruth and Truro
- Rhyl
- Salisbury
- Scarborough
- Scunthorpe
- Sheffield
- Shetland Islands
- Shrewsbury
- Sidmouth
- Skegness and Louth
- Skipton
- Slough and Heathrow Airport
- Southampton
- Southend
- Spalding
- St Andrews and Cupar
- St Austell and Newquay
- Stafford
- Stevenage and Welwyn Garden City
- Stoke-on-Trent
- Stranraer
- Street and Wells
- Sunderland
- Swansea
- Swindon
- Taunton
- Telford
- Thetford and Mildenhall
- Thurso
- Torquay and Paignton
- Trowbridge
- Tunbridge Wells
- Turriff and Banff
- Tywyn and Dolgellau
- Ullapool
- Wadebridge
- Wakefield and Castleford
- Warrington and Wigan
- Western Isles
- Weston-super-Mare
- Whitby
- Whitehaven
- Wick
- Wisbech
- Wolverhampton and Walsall
- Worcester and Kidderminster
- Workington
- Worksop and Retford
- Worthing
- Wrexham
- Yeovil
- York

== The State of the Cities ==
Travel to work areas were selected to approximate city regions as one of the main units of comparison used by the 2006 State of the English Cities report and database, commissioned and maintained by the Communities and Local Government department of the UK Government.

This has greatly increased the amount of information available about travel to work areas, although the State of the Cities only publishes data for the 56 travel to work areas based around primary urban areas in England. Travel to work areas in Scotland and Wales and those covering only rural areas are not included.

To increase the range of statistics available the State of the Cities also publishes data for travel to work areas approximated to local authority boundaries. These areas can differ considerably from the more accurate ward-based areas.

== See also ==
- Commuting zone
- Daily urban system
- Housing Market Area, a related concept in the UK
- Metropolitan area, a more general concept of a travel to work area
- Primary urban area
