= Rural–urban commuting area =

Rural–urban commuting areas (RUCAs) categorize U.S. census tracts based on measures of urbanization, population density, and daily commuting. The goal of RUCA codes is to identify rural and urban areas at a census-tract level of detail. The RUCA coding scheme is aimed at assisting researchers and policy makers focused on issues relevant to rural communities.

== Background ==
RUCA codes are based on central place theory, which highlight the link between larger cities (providing more specialized goods and services as well more jobs), smaller cities (with more limited availability of goods and services and fewer jobs), and rural areas (where residents must travel to a closer city to obtain goods and services). RUCA codes take into account both the degree of urbanization and commuting flows to categorize a census tract within the rural-urban hierarchy. RUCA codes derive from the standard Census Bureau urban area definitions but are extended to the census tract level to provide greater geographic detail.

Primary RUCA codes identify census tracts that are part of or connected to an urban core and the size of that urban area. Secondary RUCA codes then identify how strong the connection between the tract and the next larger urban core is through commuting flows.

== Primary RUCA Codes ==
Primary RUCA codes are based around four levels of urbanicity:

- Metropolitan urban areas (metro UA): 50,000 or more people; the census tract equivalent of urban areas at the center of Metropolitan Statistical Areas.
- Micropolitan urban areas (micro UA): 10,000 to 49,999 people; the census tract equivalent of urban areas at the center of Micropolitan Statistical Areas.
- Small town urban areas (small town UA): 9,999 or fewer people; the census tract equivalent of all other urban areas.
- Rural area: Outside of an urban area.

The Economic Research Service notes that, "many micropolitan and small town cores themselves (and even a few metropolitan cores) have a high enough primary commuting flow to another urban core to be considered high commuting. Typically, these areas are not job centers themselves but serve as bedroom communities for a nearby, larger city." These are not classified as an urban core but as a high commuting share location.

Primary RUCA Codes (2020)
| Code | Classification Description |
|---|---|
| 1 | Metropolitan core (in an metro UA) |
| 2 | Metropolitan high-commuting (>30% of commuting flow is to a metro UA) |
| 3 | Metropolitan low-commuting (10–30% of commuting flow is to a metro UA) |
| 4 | Micropolitan core (in a micro UA) |
| 5 | Micropolitan high-commuting (>30% of commuting flow is to a micro UA) |
| 6 | Micropolitan low-commuting (10–30% of commuting flow is to a micro UA) |
| 7 | Small town core (in a small town UA) |
| 8 | Small town high-commuting (>30% of commuting flow is to a small town UA) |
| 9 | Small town low-commuting (10–30% of commuting flow is to a small town UA) |
| 10 | Rural area (commuting flow is primarily to an area outside of an urban area) |
| 99 | Not coded (census tract is entirely in a water body, with zero population and zero land area) |

== Use of RUCA Codes ==
=== Use with ZIP Codes ===
Since much research utilizes ZIP codes instead of census tract identifiers, the ERS publishes a crosswalk transferring RUCA codes from census tracts to ZIP codes based on spatial modeling.

=== Consolidating RUCA Codes ===
Having ten primary RUCA codes provides a high degree of specificity, however, these groups may be too detailed for some uses. Many researchers and policy makers will group codes together to form a smaller list of categories.

At the extreme end, RUCA codes may be divided into two categories to identify each census tract as either rural or urban. A common scheme (used by the Federal Office of Rural Health Policy) classifies a tract based on the degree of connection to a metropolitan core. RUCA codes 1–3 are considered "Urban/metropolitan" and codes 4–10 are considered "Rural/nonmetropolitan".

The Washington State Department of Health recommends four schemes for consolidating RUCA codes:

The first scheme groups RUCA codes into four categories:

- Urban core: RUCA code 1
- Suburban: RUCA codes 2 and 3
- Large rural: RUCA codes 4 through 6
- Small town/rural: RUCA codes 7 through 10

The second scheme is the same as the first scheme; however, it also constrains the first three categories to areas with a population density over 100/square mile, and areas with a sparser population are categorized as "small town/rural".

The third scheme extends the second scheme by dividing small town and rural. This approach is useful when analyzing demographics and the ability to reach rural areas.

- Urban core: RUCA code 1
- Suburban: RUCA codes 2 and 3 with population density greater than 100/sq. mi.
- Large rural: RUCA codes 4 through 6 with population density greater than 100/sq. mi.
- Small town: RUCA codes 7 through 10 AND population density greater than 50/sq. mi., or RUCA codes 1 through 6 with population density less than 100/sq. mi.
- Rural: RUCA codes 2 through 10 with population density less than 50/sq. mi.

The fourth scheme modifies the assigned codes for rural by adding a fifth level, "Isolated", which includes non-urban areas with a population density less than 5/sq. mi.

=== Challenges When Using RUCA Codes ===
Several limitations and challenges have been identified by researchers and policy makers using RUCA codes. The most common concerns raised can be grouped into two broad categories. First, RUCA codes are only updated every ten years, which may not keep up with more frequent changes in economies and geographies.

Second, RUCA codes are based on commuting flows and may not fully capture other relevant dimensions including social factors and demographic characteristics. Different approaches for determining rurality can have important consequences when used for research and policy decisions, and a high degree of variability exists between these different approaches.

Third, RUCA codes are often deemed too complex or precise, with multiple ways to combine codes that yield differing definitions of "rural".

== RUCA Classification Data Sources ==
RUCA codes are updated every year and may be found on the website of the Economic Research Service (ERS) of the United States Department of Agriculture and the University of Washington. The ERS uses population and urban area data tabulated from the Census of Population and Housing, with commuting flows determined using the Census Transportation Planning Package, a tabulation created for the U.S. Department of Transportation based on the American Community Survey.

== History of RUCA Codes ==
The RUCA coding scheme was driven by the need for more precise targeting of research focused on rural needs. Urbanicity categorizations were largely at the county level, and did not take commuting flos into consideration. The RUCA classification approach recognizes that individuals in rural areas obtain most of their employment, daily necessities, and healthcare services within a rural area. In the mid-1990s, interest grew in developing rural-urban classification schemes at a sub-county levels and the WWAMI Rural Health Research Center, with funding from the HRSA Federal Office of Rural Health Policy and the USDA Economic Research Service, began developing the first set of RUCA codes, released in 1998, and based on 1998 zip code areas and 1990 census commuting data.

In 2005, a second version was created based on 2004 zip code areas and 2000 census commuting data. This was updated based on 2006 zip codes as version 2.0 (b).

Following the 2020 Census, the ERS created an updated RUCA code dataset that expanded classifications to all US territories (the 2010 codes excluded US island territories other than Puerto Rico), added identifiers for associated urban areas, included commuting flow destinations, included census tracts with zero population (but having land area), and increased the threshold for considering a census tract as part of an urban core.

== Alternatives to RUCA Coding ==
Alternative approaches used in research and policy making include:

- USDA Urban Influence Codes, which classify U.S. counties and county equivalents into twelve categories (two metropolitan and ten non-metropolitan) based on the size of largest city or town and proximity to metropolitan and micropolitan areas.
- CDC National Center for Health Statistics Urban-Rural classification scheme, which categorizes counties into six categories (four metropolitan, one micropolitan, and one non-core).
- US Office of Management and Budget Core-Based Statistical Areas, which categorize counties as metropolitan, micropolitan, and nonmetropolitan based on numerous factors, but with an emphasis on the labor market.
- Determining break points based on the population of census places.
- Using proximity to and size of Census Urban Areas, which take into account both population density and housing unit density at the census block level.
- Using USDA Business and Industry ineligible locations (census places with more than 50,000 people and adjacent urbanized areas).
- The Urbanization Perceptions Small Area Index (UPSAI), classifying census tracts as "urban", "suburban", and "rural" based on the perception of survey respondents.

Researchers have suggested several novel approaches to improve upon RUCA codes:

- In 2024, researchers studying disparities in HIV outcomes suggested a three-tiered rural-urban scale ("rural", "periurban", and "urban") classified at the census tract level and derived from population density, percentage of the workforce employeed in natural resources, mean walkability index (which measures the built environment), percentage of households in single-unit dwellings, and air quality with factor weights applied at state level to account for differences in rurality between states and cutoff scores selected through a survey of public health professionals.
- The Index of Relative Rurality is a continuous measure of rurality based on population size, population density, percentage of urban residents, and distance to the closest metropolitan area.
- tract-level Integrated Metropolitan-to-Frontier Area Codes (tlMFAC) categorized census tracts into five categories ("metropolitan", "micropolitan", "frontier-micropolitan", "small town/rural", and "frontier-small town/rural") by combining ERS Frontier and Remote Area (FAR) codes with RUCA codes to account for geographic remoteness.
