= List of regions of Japan =

Map of the regions of Japan. From northeast to southwest: Hokkaidō (red), Tōhoku (yellow), Kantō (green), Chūbu (cyan), Kansai (indigo), Chūgoku (orange), Shikoku (purple), and Kyūshū & Okinawa (grey).

Japan is often divided into regions, each containing one or more of the country's 47 prefectures at large. Sometimes, they are referred to as "blocs" (ブロック, burokku), or "regional blocs" (地域ブロック, chiiki burokku) as opposed to more granular regional divisions. They are not official administrative units, though they have been used by government officials for statistical and other purposes since 1905. They are widely used in, for example, maps, geography textbooks, and weather reports, and many businesses and institutions use their home regions in their names as well, for example Kyushu National Museum, Kinki Nippon Railway, Chūgoku Bank, and Tōhoku University.

One common division groups the prefectures into eight regions. In this arrangement, three of the four main islands of Japan, namely Hokkaidō, Shikoku, and Kyūshū, each form their own region, while the largest island, Honshū, is split into five regions. Minor islands are grouped with the larger ones, for example with the Satsunan Islands being included under Kyūshū and the Tokyo Islands under Kantō. Okinawa Prefecture is usually considered part of Kyūshū, but is sometimes treated as its own ninth region.

Japan has eight High Courts, but their jurisdictions do not match the typical eight-region geographical division (see #Other regional divisions and Judicial system of Japan for details).

== Table ==
Region	Population	Area in km^{2}	Prefectures contained
Hokkaidō 北海道(ほっかいどう)	5.1 million	83,000	Hokkaidō 北海道(ほっかいどう)
Tōhoku 東北(とうほく)	8.9 million	67,000	Akita 秋田(あきた), Aomori 青森(あおもり), Fukushima 福島(ふくしま), Iwate 岩手(いわて), Miyagi 宮城(みやぎ), Yamagata 山形(やまがた)
Kantō 関東(かんとう)	43.3 million	32,000	Chiba 千葉(ちば), Gunma 群馬(ぐんま), Ibaraki 茨城(いばらき), Kanagawa 神奈川(かながわ), Saitama 埼玉(さいたま), Tochigi 栃木(とちぎ), Tōkyō 東京(とうきょう)
Chūbu中部(ちゅうぶ)	21.4 million	67,000	Aichi 愛知(あいち), Fukui 福井(ふくい), Gifu 岐阜(ぎふけん), Ishikawa 石川(いしかわ), Nagano 長野(ながの), Niigata 新潟(にいがた), Shizuoka 静岡(しずおか), Toyama 富山(とやま), Yamanashi 山梨(やまなし)
Kansai 関西(かんさい)(also known as Kinki 近畿(きんき))	22.5 million	33,000	Hyōgo 兵庫(ひょうご), Kyōto 京都(きょうと), Mie 三重(みえ), Nara 奈良(なら), Ōsaka 大阪(おおさか), Shiga 滋賀(しが), Wakayama 和歌山(わかやま)
Chūgoku 中国(ちゅうごく)	7.3 million	32,000	Hiroshima 広島(ひろしま), Okayama 岡山(おかやま), Shimane 島根(しまね), Tottori 鳥取(とっとり), Yamaguchi 山口(やまぐち)
Shikoku 四国(しこく)	3.8 million	19,000	Ehime 愛媛(えひめ), Kagawa 香川(かがわ), Kōchi 高知(こうち), Tokushima 徳島(とくしま)
Kyūshū 九州(きゅうしゅう) & Okinawa 沖縄(おきなわ)	14.3 million	44,000	Fukuoka 福岡(ふくおか), Kagoshima 鹿児島(かごしま), Kumamoto 熊本(くまもと), Miyazaki 宮崎(みやざき), Nagasaki 長崎(ながさき), Ōita 大分(おおいた), Okinawa 沖縄(おきなわ), Saga 佐賀(さが)

== Regions and islands ==
This is a list of Japan's major islands, traditional regions, and subregions, going from northeast to southwest. The eight traditional regions are marked in bold.

- **Hokkaidō** (the island and its archipelago)
- Honshū
  - **Tōhoku region** (northern part)
  - **Kantō region** (eastern part)
    - Nanpō Islands (part of Tokyo Metropolis)
  - **Chūbu region** (central part)
    - Hokuriku region (northwestern Chūbu)
    - Kōshin'etsu region (northeastern Chūbu)
    - Tōkai region (southern Chūbu)
  - **Kansai (or Kinki) region** (south-central part)
  - **Chūgoku region** (western part)
    - San'in region (northern Chūgoku)
    - San'yō region (southern Chūgoku)
- **Shikoku**
- **Kyūshū**
  - Northern Kyūshū
  - Southern Kyūshū
  - Ryukyu Islands
    - Satsunan Islands
    - Okinawa

== Other regional divisions ==
In many contexts in Japan (government, media markets, sports, regional business or trade union confederations), regional groupings are used that digress from the above-mentioned common 8-region geographical division. The 8-region model is frequently regarded as a standard on the English Wikipedia and some other English-language publications. Examples of regional divisions used by other particular institutions include:

National Police Agency regional supervisory offices
Region	Prefectures
–	Hokkaidō (separate liaison office with the National Police Agency)
Tōhoku	Aomori, Iwate, Miyagi, Akita, Yamagata, Fukushima
–	Tokyo (separate liaison office with the National Police Agency)
Kantō	Ibaraki, Tochigi, Gunma, Saitama, Chiba, Kanagawa, Niigata, Nagano, Yamanashi, Shizuoka
Chūbu	Toyama, Ishikawa, Fukui, Gifu, Aichi, Mie
Kinki	Shiga, Kyoto, Osaka, Hyōgo, Nara, Wakayama
Chūgoku	Tottori, Shimane, Okayama, Hiroshima, Yamaguchi
Shikoku	Tokushima, Kagawa, Ehime, Kōchi
Kyūshū	Fukuoka, Saga, Nagasaki, Kumamoto, Ōita, Miyazaki, Kagoshima, Okinawa

NHK broadcasting regions
Region	Prefectures
Hokkaidō	Hokkaidō
Tōhoku	Aomori, Iwate, Miyagi, Akita, Yamagata, Fukushima
Kantō-Kōshin'etsu	Ibaraki, Tochigi, Gunma, Saitama, Chiba, Tokyo, Kanagawa, Nagano, Niigata, Yamanashi
Tōkai-Hokuriku	Toyama, Ishikawa, Fukui, Shizuoka, Gifu, Aichi, Mie
Kinki	Shiga, Kyoto, Osaka, Hyōgo, Nara, Wakayama
Chūgoku	Tottori, Shimane, Okayama, Hiroshima, Yamaguchi
Shikoku	Tokushima, Kagawa, Ehime, Kōchi
Kyūshū	Fukuoka, Saga, Nagasaki, Kumamoto, Ōita, Miyazaki, Kagoshima, Okinawa

MLIT regional development offices
Region	Prefectures (Nagano is split)
–	Hokkaidō (originally had a separate, cabinet-level development agency, now a separate MLIT department)
Tōhoku	Aomori, Iwate, Miyagi, Akita, Yamagata, Fukushima
Kantō	Ibaraki, Tochigi, Gunma, Saitama, Chiba, Tokyo, Kanagawa, Yamanashi, Nagano (northern part)
Hokuriku	Niigata, Toyama, Ishikawa
Chūbu	Nagano (southern part), Gifu, Shizuoka, Aichi, Mie
Kinki	Shiga, Kyoto, Osaka, Hyōgo, Nara, Wakayama, Fukui
Chūgoku	Tottori, Shimane, Okayama, Hiroshima, Yamaguchi
Shikoku	Tokushima, Kagawa, Ehime, Kōchi
Kyūshū	Fukuoka, Saga, Nagasaki, Kumamoto, Ōita, Miyazaki, Kagoshima
–	Okinawa (originally had a separate, cabinet-level development agency, now a department in the Cabinet Office)

JMA weather forecast regions
Region	Prefectures
Hokkaidō	Hokkaidō
Tōhoku	Aomori, Iwate, Miyagi, Akita, Yamagata, Fukushima
Kantō-Kōshin	Ibaraki, Tochigi, Gunma, Saitama, Chiba, Tokyo, Kanagawa, Yamanashi, Nagano
Hokuriku	Niigata, Toyama, Ishikawa, Fukui
Tōkai	Gifu, Shizuoka, Aichi, Mie
Kinki	Shiga, Kyoto, Osaka, Hyōgo, Nara, Wakayama
Chūgoku	Tottori, Shimane, Okayama, Hiroshima
Shikoku	Tokushima, Kagawa, Ehime, Kōchi
Northern Kyūshū	Yamaguchi, Fukuoka, Saga, Nagasaki, Kumamoto, Ōita
Southern Kyūshū-Amami	Miyazaki, Kagoshima
Okinawa	Okinawa

Regional proportional representation constituencies for the lower house of the Japanese parliament

Proportional constituencies ("blocks") for elections to the House of Representatives
Constituency	Prefectures
Hokkaidō	Hokkaidō
Tōhoku	Aomori, Iwate, Miyagi, Akita, Yamagata, Fukushima
Northern Kantō	Ibaraki, Tochigi, Gunma, Saitama
Tokyo	Tokyo
Southern Kantō	Chiba, Kanagawa, Yamanashi
Hokuriku-Shin'etsu	Niigata, Nagano, Toyama, Ishikawa, Fukui
Tōkai	Gifu, Shizuoka, Aichi, Mie
Kinki	Shiga, Kyoto, Osaka, Hyōgo, Nara, Wakayama
Chūgoku	Tottori, Shimane, Okayama, Hiroshima, Yamaguchi
Shikoku	Tokushima, Kagawa, Ehime, Kōchi
Kyūshū	Fukuoka, Saga, Nagasaki, Kumamoto, Ōita, Miyazaki, Kagoshima, Okinawa

High Court jurisdictions
High court	Prefectures
Sapporo	Hokkaidō
Sendai	Aomori, Iwate, Miyagi, Akita, Yamagata, Fukushima
Tokyo	Tokyo, Ibaraki, Tochigi, Gunma, Saitama, Chiba, Kanagawa, Niigata, Yamanashi, Nagano, Shizuoka
Nagoya	Aichi, Mie, Gifu, Ishikawa, Fukui, Toyama
Osaka	Shiga, Kyoto, Osaka, Hyōgo, Nara, Wakayama
Hiroshima	Tottori, Shimane, Okayama, Hiroshima, Yamaguchi
Takamatsu	Tokushima, Kagawa, Ehime, Kōchi
Fukuoka	Fukuoka, Saga, Nagasaki, Kumamoto, Ōita, Miyazaki, Kagoshima, Okinawa

Regional qualifiers for the "spring Kōshien" (Japanese High School Baseball Invitational Tournament)
Region	Prefectures
Hokkaidō	Hokkaidō
Tōhoku	Aomori, Iwate, Miyagi, Akita, Yamagata, Fukushima
Kantō	Ibaraki, Tochigi, Gunma, Saitama, Chiba, Kanagawa, Yamanashi
Tokyo	Tokyo
Tōkai	Gifu, Shizuoka, Aichi, Mie
Hoku-Shin'etsu	Niigata, Nagano, Toyama, Ishikawa, Fukui
Kinki	Shiga, Kyoto, Osaka, Hyōgo, Nara, Wakayama
Chūgoku	Tottori, Shimane, Okayama, Hiroshima, Yamaguchi
Shikoku	Tokushima, Kagawa, Ehime, Kōchi
Kyūshū	Fukuoka, Saga, Nagasaki, Kumamoto, Ōita, Miyazaki, Kagoshima, Okinawa

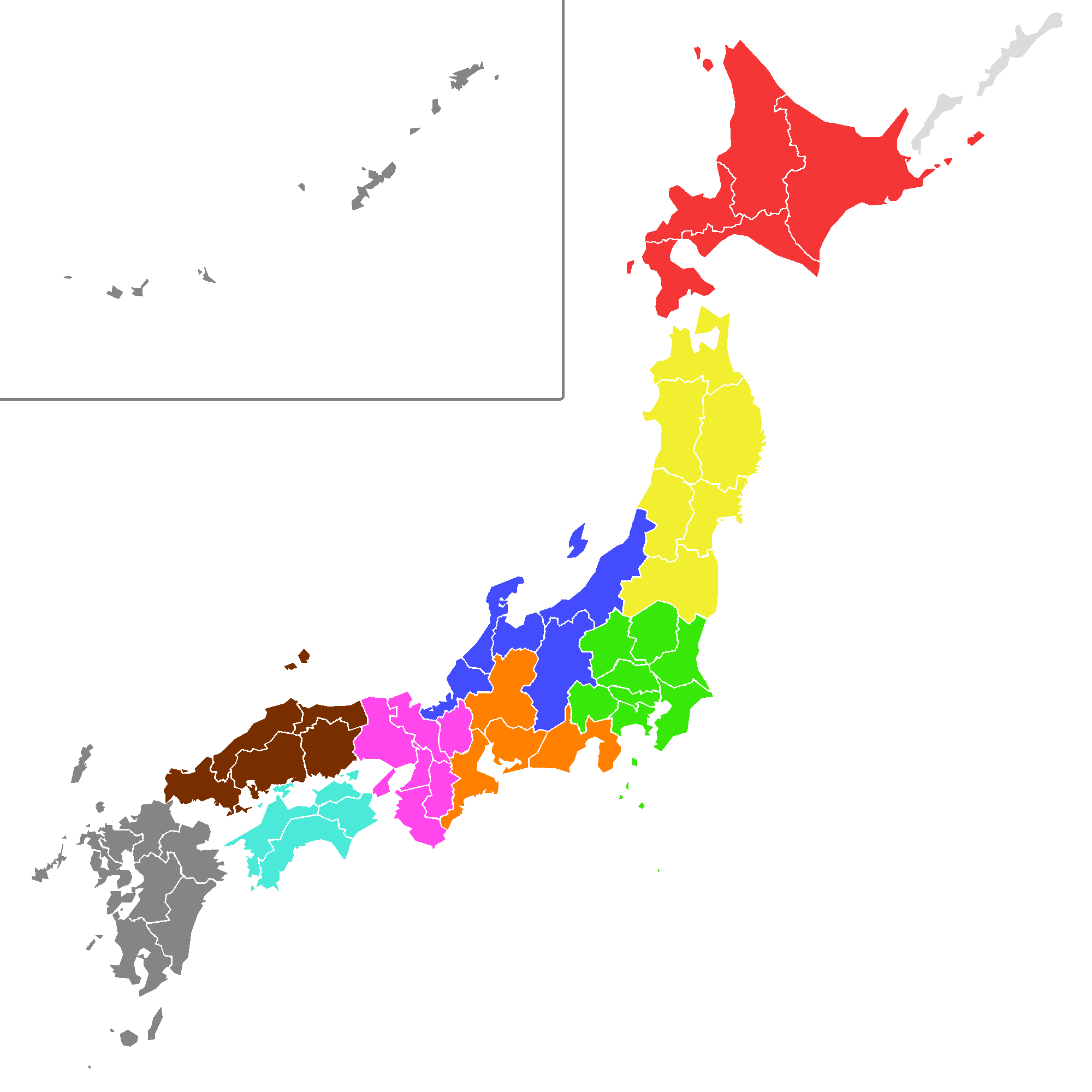
Football regions of Japan

Regional football/soccer leagues
Region	Prefectures
Hokkaidō	Hokkaidō
Tōhoku	North: Aomori, Iwate, Akita; South: Miyagi, Yamagata, Fukushima
Kantō	Ibaraki, Tochigi, Gunma, Saitama, Chiba, Tokyo, Kanagawa, Yamanashi
Tōkai	Gifu, Shizuoka, Aichi, Mie
Hoku-Shin'etsu	Niigata, Toyama, Ishikawa, Fukui, Nagano
Kansai	Shiga, Kyoto, Osaka, Hyōgo, Nara, Wakayama
Chūgoku	Tottori, Shimane, Okayama, Hiroshima, Yamaguchi
Shikoku	Tokushima, Kagawa, Ehime, Kōchi
Kyūshū	Fukuoka, Saga, Nagasaki, Kumamoto, Ōita, Miyazaki, Kagoshima, Okinawa

Regions used in the Bank of Japan regional economical report ("Sakura report")
Region	Prefectures
Hokkaidō	Hokkaidō
Tōhoku	Aomori, Iwate, Miyagi, Akita, Yamagata, Fukushima
Hokuriku	Toyama, Ishikawa, Fukui
Kantō-Kōshin'etsu	Ibaraki, Tochigi, Gunma, Saitama, Chiba, Tokyo, Kanagawa, Niigata, Yamanashi, Nagano
Tōkai	Gifu, Shizuoka, Aichi, Mie
Kinki	Shiga, Kyoto, Osaka, Hyōgo, Nara, Wakayama
Chūgoku	Tottori, Shimane, Okayama, Hiroshima, Yamaguchi
Shikoku	Tokushima, Kagawa, Ehime, Kōchi
Kyūshū-Okinawa	Fukuoka, Saga, Nagasaki, Kumamoto, Ōita, Miyazaki, Kagoshima, Okinawa

== Regions as administrative units ==
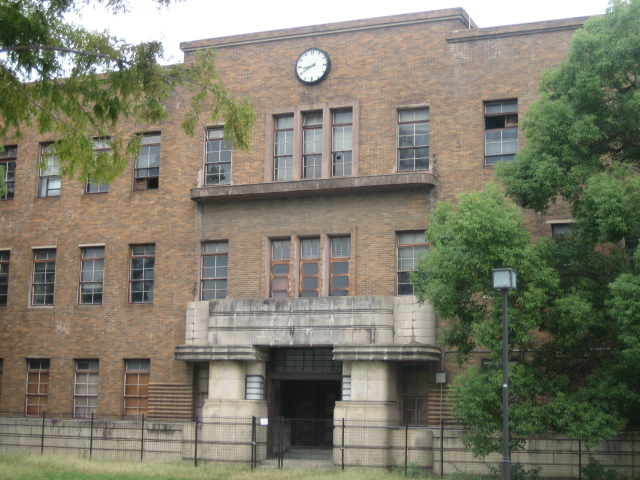
1945 seat of the Chūgoku governorate-general in Hiroshima City, previously and today a building used by Hiroshima University

In the later stages of World War II, in preparation for an Allied invasion of the home islands, regions served as administrative units between the Home Ministry and the governments of prefectures from 1943. Initially, nine "regional administrative joint conferences" (地方行政協議会, chihō gyōsei kyō-kaigi) were set up, each comprising several prefectural governments under the leadership of one prefectural government. In 1945, they were consolidated into eight centralized "regional governorates-general" (地方総監府, chihō sōkan-fu) with authority of command over the subordinate prefectural governments. The regions corresponded territorially to the military districts (軍管区, gunkan-ku) as used by the Imperial Army in 1945. They were namely:

Region (-chihō)	Prefectures (-to/-chō/-fu/-ken)	Seat of the governorate-general	Regional governor-general (chihō sōkan) (initially in June 1945)	Corresponding Imperial Army military district (gunkan-ku)
Hokkai	Karafuto, Hokkaidō	Sapporo City	Kumagai Ken'ichi (concurrent governor of Hokkaidō(-chō))	Hokubu (Northern)
Tōhoku	Aomori, Iwate, Miyagi, Akita, Yamagata, Fukushima	Sendai City	Maruyama Tsurukichi (previous governor of Miyagi)	Tōhoku (Northeastern)
Kantō-Shin'etsu	Ibaraki, Tochigi, Gunma, Saitama, Chiba, Tokyo, Kanagawa, Yamanashi, Niigata, Nagano	Tokyo	Nishio Toshizō (concurrent governor of Tokyo)	Tōbu (Eastern)
Tōkai-Hokuriku	Gifu, Shizuoka, Aichi, Mie, Toyama, Ishikawa	Nagoya City	Obata Tadayoshi (previous governor of Aichi)	Tōkai
Kinki	Shiga, Kyoto, Osaka, Hyōgo, Nara, Wakayama, Fukui	Osaka City	Yasui Eiji (previous governor of Osaka)	Chūbu (Central)
Chūgoku	Tottori, Shimane, Okayama, Hiroshima, Yamaguchi	Hiroshima City	Ōtsuka Isei (previous governor of Hiroshima)	Chūgoku
Shikoku	Tokushima, Kagawa, Ehime, Kōchi	Takamatsu City	Kimura Masayoshi (concurrent governor of Kagawa)	Shikoku
Kyūshū	Fukuoka, Saga, Nagasaki, Kumamoto, Ōita, Miyazaki, Kagoshima, Okinawa	Fukuoka City	Totsuka Kuichirō (previous governor of Fukuoka)	Seibu (Western)

After capitulation, the governorates-general were immediately dissolved by GHQ/SCAP and the (in the Empire: very limited) local autonomy of prefectural governments and their elected assemblies restored to be eventually substantially expanded by the Constitution and the Local Autonomy Law in 1947.

== See also ==
- Ecoregions of Japan
- Geography of Japan
- Prefectures of Japan
