= Taiheiyō Belt =

Megalopolis in Japan

Coordinates: 35.0000°N 136.0000°E

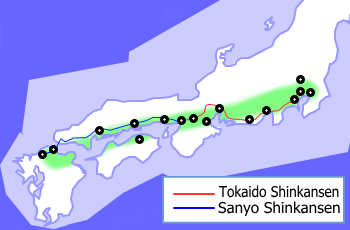
A map of the Taiheiyō Belt showing the Tōkaidō and Sanyō shinkansen routes

The Taiheiyō Belt (Japanese: 太平洋ベルト, Hepburn: Taiheiyō Beruto; lit. "Pacific Belt"), also known as the Tōkaidō corridor, is the megalopolis in Japan extending from Ibaraki Prefecture in the northeast to Fukuoka Prefecture in the southwest, running for almost 1,200 km (750 mi). Its estimated population as of 2011 was about 80 million.

The urbanization zone runs mainly along the Pacific coast (hence the name) of Japan from Kantō region to Osaka, and the Inland Sea (on both sides) to Fukuoka, and is concentrated along the Tōkaidō–Sanyō rail corridor. A view of Japan at night clearly shows a rather dense and continuous strip of light (demarcating urban zones) that delineates the region. The high population is particularly due to the large plains – the Kantō Plain, Kinai Plain, and Nōbi Plain – which facilitate building in otherwise mountainous Japan.

Although the Taiheiyō Belt contains the majority of Japan's population, references to the term in Japanese are mainly economic or regional in nature. The term was first used in 1960 in an Economic Commission Subcommittee Report formed to double the national income. At that time, it was identified as the core of the nation's industrial complex. Other than the Miyagi area, nearly all manufacturing industry in the nation lies in this zone, accounting for 70% of the nation's economic output in 2007 (about US$4–5 trillion). The Shinkansen line south (and west) of Tokyo runs the course through the belt cities.

The region is specifically defined by the Ministry of International Trade and Industry as the following prefectures: Ibaraki, Saitama, Chiba, Tokyo, Kanagawa, Shizuoka, Aichi, Gifu, Mie, Osaka, Hyōgo, Wakayama, Okayama, Hiroshima, Yamaguchi, Fukuoka and Oita.

The Sea of Japan has a much less well-developed string of cities, called Ura-nippon (裏日本) (literally "inner side of Japan"), stretching 1000 km from Akita to Yamaguchi.

== Major cities ==
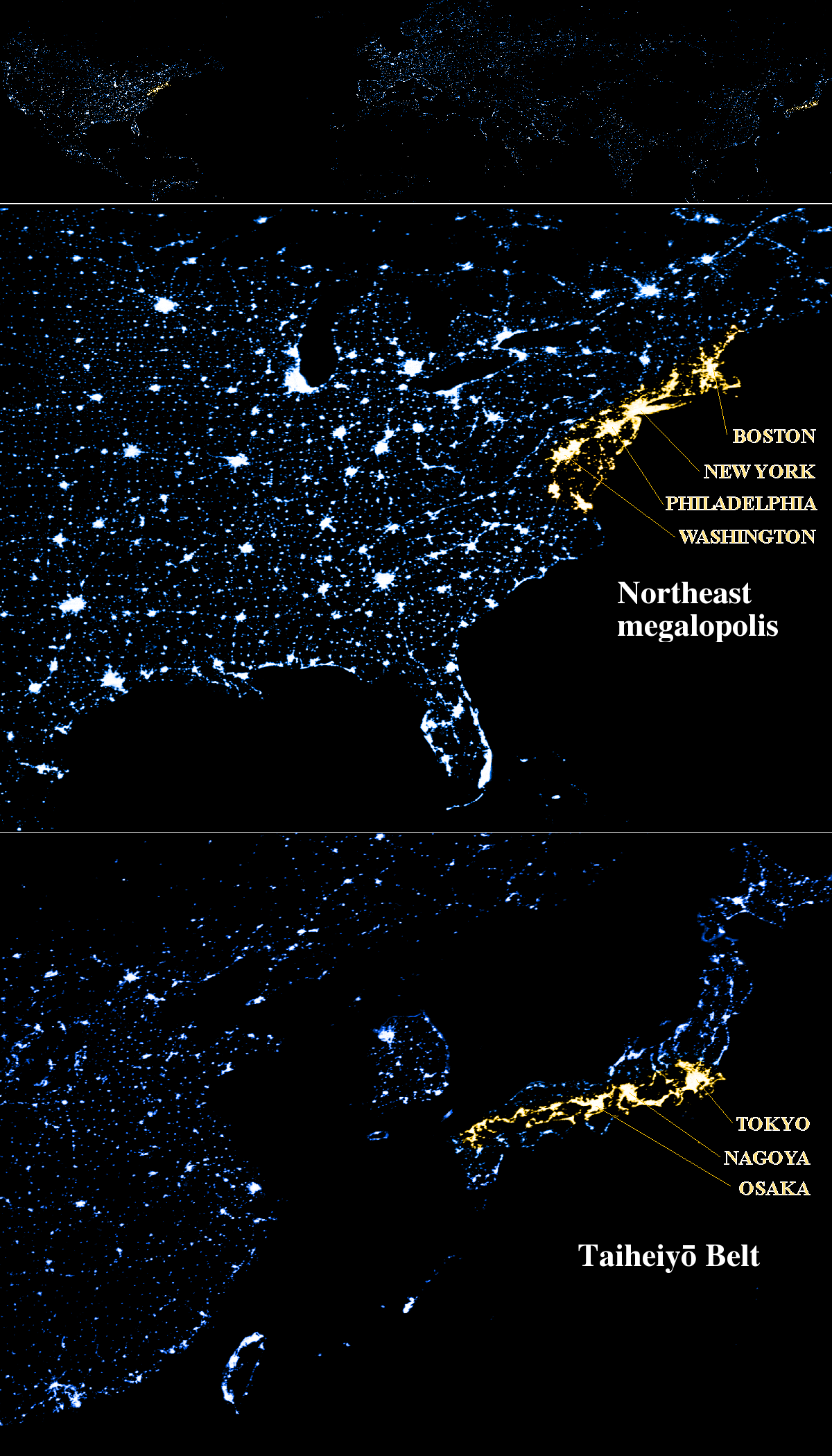
A nighttime satellite photo comparison (to scale) of the Northeast Megalopolis in the United States (top) and the Taiheiyō Belt (bottom)

Major cities of Taiheiyō Belt

Listed from north to south:

City	Region	Including	Population (2010)	GDP (million US$)
Greater Mito	Kantō	Hitachinaka	678,969	30,258
Greater Tsukuba	Kantō	Tsuchiura	847,292	37,132
Greater Tokyo	Kantō	Saitama, Chiba, Yokohama, Kawasaki, Sagamihara	34,834,167	1,797,899
Greater Numazu	Chūbu	Mishima	509,249	22,888
Greater Shizuoka	Chūbu	Yaizu, Fujieda	1,001,597	45,840
Greater Hamamatsu	Chūbu	Iwata, Fukuroi	1,133,879	54,258
Greater Toyohashi	Chūbu	Toyokawa	676,333	31,001
Greater Nagoya	Chūbu	Ichinomiya, Kasugai, Kuwana, Kani	5,490,453	256,290
Greater Yokkaichi	Kansai	Suzuka	621,689	29,072
Greater Kyoto	Kansai	Uji, Otsu, Kusatsu	2,679,094	115,258
Greater Osaka	Kansai	Sakai, Higashiosaka, Nishinomiya, Nara	12,273,041	516,775
Greater Kobe	Kansai	Akashi, Kakogawa, Takasago	2,431,076	96,004
Greater Himeji	Kansai	Tatsuno	784,365	33,587
Greater Wakayama	Kansai	Iwade	584,852	24,592
Greater Tokushima	Shikoku	Anan	680,467	28,384
Greater Okayama	Chūgoku	Kurashiki, Sōja	1,532,146	63,101
Greater Takamatsu	Shikoku	Marugame	830,040	34,722
Greater Fukuyama	Chūgoku	Onomichi	764,838	31,518
Greater Hiroshima	Chūgoku	Hatsukaichi, Fuchu-cho	1,141,848	61,345
Greater Matsuyama	Shikoku	Iyo	642,841	24,509
Greater Kitakyushu	Kyushu	Yukuhashi, Nogata	1,370,169	55,693
Greater Fukuoka	Kyushu	Kasuga, Chikushino, Itoshima	2,495,552	101,644
Greater Ōita	Kyushu	Beppu	743,323	28,881

May also include:

city	region	including	population	GDP (million US$)
Greater Kumamoto	Kyushu	Uki, Kōshi	1,102,398	39,763

== See also ==
- List of metropolitan areas in Japan by population
