= Northern Kyushu =

Subregion of Kyushu

Northern Kyushu Data
Sum of 5 prefectures
Area	25,256.75km²
General Population	10,381,372 (Sept 2008)
Pop Density	411.03 per km^{2} (Sept 2008)

Northern Kyushu (北部九州, Hokubu Kyūshū) is a subregion of Kyushu.

This northern region encompasses the prefectures of Fukuoka, Saga, Nagasaki, Kumamoto, and Ōita.

== History ==
Before 1963, it was called North Kyushu (Kitakyūshū, 北九州) until the city of Kitakyushu was formed. The city's name means "North Kyushu" in Japanese, so to avoid confusion, the region's name was changed.

It is the most urbanized and industrialized part of the Kyushu region.

For development analysis, the area is construed to include Yamaguchi Prefecture on Honshu. Although Yamaguchi is not part of Kyushu, it is a functional satellite of the Kanmon Straits Metropolitan Area.

The region is part of the Taiheiyō Belt and comprises the Northern Kyushu Industrial Zone.

== See also ==
- Fukuoka–Kitakyushu
- Kyushu
- Southern Kyushu
