= List of metropolitan areas in Japan =

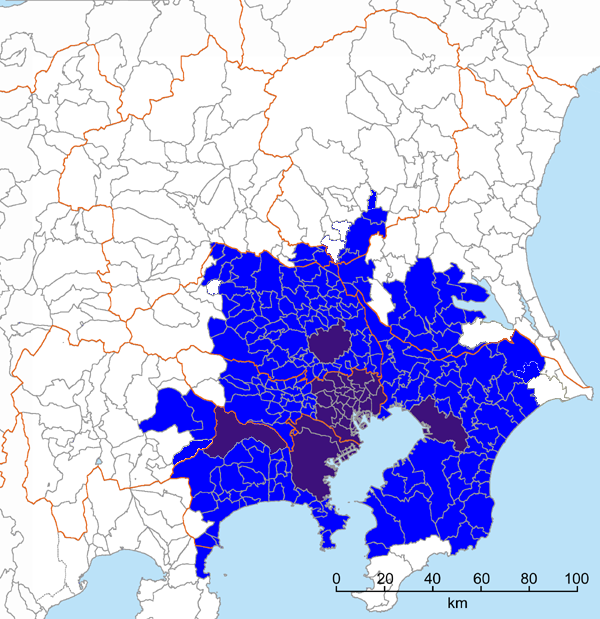
Kantō Major Metropolitan Area

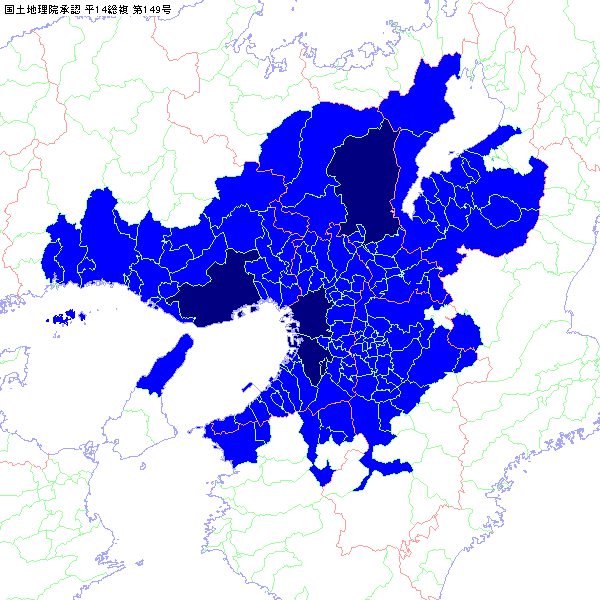
Keihanshin MMA

This is a list of metropolitan areas (都市圏, toshiken) in Japan by population as defined by the Statistics Bureau of Japan (SBJ) and the Center for Spatial Information Science of the University of Tokyo. The region containing most of the people in Japan between Tokyo and Fukuoka is often called the Taiheiyō Belt.

== Population Census ==
The Statistics Bureau of Japan (SBJ) defines a metropolitan area as one or more central cities and its associated outlying municipalities. To qualify as an outlying municipality, the municipality must have at least 1.5% of its resident population aged 15 and above commuting to school or work into one of the central cities. To qualify as a central city, a city must either be a designated city of any population or a non-designated city with a city proper population of at least 500,000. Metropolitan areas of designated cities are defined as "major metropolitan areas" (大都市圏) while those of non-designated cities are simply "metropolitan areas" (都市圏). If multiple central cities are close enough such that their outlying cities overlap, they are combined and a single metropolitan area is defined rather than independently.

=== 2015 Population Census ===
The metropolitan areas written in bold are the 11 major metropolitan areas of Japan.

- 2015
- MMA: Major Metropolitan Area
- MA: Metropolitan Area
- Source: Statistics Bureau of Japan

Rank	Area	Prefecture	Central City	Area Population
**01**	**Kantō MMA**	Tokyo, Kanagawa Prefecture, Saitama Prefecture, Chiba Prefecture, Ibaraki Prefecture, Tochigi Prefecture, Gunma Prefecture, Yamanashi Prefecture	23 special wards area, Yokohama, Sagamihara, Kawasaki, Chiba, Saitama	37,273,866
**02**	**Keihanshin MMA**	Osaka Prefecture, Kyoto Prefecture, Hyōgo Prefecture, Nara Prefecture, Shiga Prefecture, Wakayama Prefecture	Osaka, Sakai, Kobe, Kyoto	19,302,746
**03**	**Chūkyō MMA**	Aichi Prefecture, Gifu Prefecture, Mie Prefecture	Nagoya	9,363,221
**04**	**Fukuoka-Kitakyushu MMA**	Fukuoka Prefecture	Fukuoka, Kitakyushu	5,538,142
**05**	**Shizuoka-Hamamatsu MMA**	Shizuoka Prefecture	Shizuoka, Hamamatsu	2,842,151
**06**	**Sapporo MMA**	Ishikari Subprefecture in Hokkaidō	Sapporo	2,636,254
**07**	**Sendai MMA**	Miyagi Prefecture	Sendai	2,256,964
**08**	**Hiroshima MMA**	Hiroshima Prefecture	Hiroshima	2,096,745
09	Utsunomiya MA	Tochigi Prefecture	Utsunomiya	1,655,673
**10**	**Okayama MMA**	Okayama Prefecture	Okayama	1,639,414
**11**	**Kumamoto MMA**	Kumamoto Prefecture	Kumamoto	1,492,975
**12**	**Niigata MMA**	Niigata Prefecture	Niigata	1,395,612
13	Kagoshima MA	Kagoshima Prefecture	Kagoshima	1,126,639
14	Matsuyama MA	Ehime Prefecture	Matsuyama	706,883

=== 2010 Population Census ===
The metropolitan areas written in bold are the 11 major metropolitan areas of Japan.

- 2010
- MMA: Major Metropolitan Area
- MA: Metropolitan Area
- Source: Statistics Bureau of Japan

Rank	Area	Prefecture	Central City	Area Population
**01**	**Kantō MMA**	Tokyo, Kanagawa Prefecture, Saitama Prefecture, Chiba Prefecture, Ibaraki Prefecture, Tochigi Prefecture, Gunma Prefecture, Yamanashi Prefecture	23 special wards area, Yokohama, Sagamihara, Kawasaki, Chiba, Saitama	36,923,193
**02**	**Keihanshin MMA**	Osaka Prefecture, Kyoto Prefecture, Hyōgo Prefecture, Nara Prefecture, Shiga Prefecture, Wakayama Prefecture	Osaka, Sakai, Kobe, Kyoto	19,341,976
**03**	**Chūkyō MMA**	Aichi Prefecture, Gifu Prefecture, Mie Prefecture	Nagoya	9,107,414
**04**	**Fukuoka-Kitakyushu MMA**	Fukuoka Prefecture	Fukuoka, Kitakyushu	5,515,427
**05**	**Shizuoka-Hamamatsu MMA**	Shizuoka Prefecture	Shizuoka, Hamamatsu	2,741,028
**06**	**Sapporo MMA**	Ishikari Subprefecture in Hokkaidō	Sapporo	2,584,880
**07**	**Sendai MMA**	Miyagi Prefecture	Sendai	2,169,757
**08**	**Hiroshima MMA**	Hiroshima Prefecture	Hiroshima	2,099,514
09	Utsunomiya MA	Tochigi Prefecture	Utsunomiya	1,886,898
**10**	**Okayama MMA**	Okayama Prefecture	Okayama	1,647,892
**11**	**Kumamoto MMA**	Kumamoto Prefecture	Kumamoto	1,476,435
**12**	**Niigata MMA**	Niigata Prefecture	Niigata	1,421,694
13	Kagoshima MA	Kagoshima Prefecture	Kagoshima	1,152,748
14	Matsuyama MA	Ehime Prefecture	Matsuyama	717,687

Changes from 2005 census

The following changes to metropolitan area definitions were made in the 2010 Census report.

- New central cities in Kantō and Keihanshin major metropolitan areas
  - Sagamihara in the Kantō MMA and Sakai in the Keihanshin MMA have become designated cities in 2010 and 2006 respectively. These cities are already well within their MMAs and should not greatly alter their formation.
- Niigata and Okayama major metropolitan areas
  - Niigata became a designated city in 2007 and Okayama became a designated city in 2009. These cities therefore formed major metropolitan areas in the 2010 census.
- Shizuoka, Hamamatsu major metropolitan area
  - Hamamatsu also became a designated city in 2007. As its outlying areas overlap with Shizuoka, the two cities formed a single major metropolitan area in the 2010 census.
- Utsunomiya metropolitan area
  - Utsunomiya qualified as a central city for the 2010 census, resulting from mergers with neighboring municipalities and subsequent population growth.

=== 2005 Population Census ===
The metropolitan areas written in bold are the 8 major metropolitan areas of Japan.

- October 1, 2005
- MMA: Major Metropolitan Area
- MA: Metropolitan Area
- Source: Statistics Bureau of Japan

Rank	Area	Prefecture	Central City	Area Population
**01**	**Kantō MMA**	Tokyo, Kanagawa Prefecture, Saitama Prefecture, Chiba Prefecture, Ibaraki Prefecture, Tochigi Prefecture, Gunma Prefecture, Yamanashi Prefecture	23 special wards area, Yokohama, Kawasaki, Chiba, Saitama	35,682,460
**02**	**Keihanshin MMA**	Osaka Prefecture, Kyoto Prefecture, Hyōgo Prefecture, Nara Prefecture, Shiga Prefecture, Wakayama Prefecture	Osaka, Kobe, Kyoto	18,768,395
**03**	**Chūkyō MMA**	Aichi Prefecture, Gifu Prefecture, Mie Prefecture	Nagoya	8,923,445
**04**	**Fukuoka-Kitakyushu MMA**	Fukuoka Prefecture	Fukuoka, Kitakyushu	5,590,378
**05**	**Sapporo MMA**	Ishikari Subprefecture in Hokkaidō	Sapporo	2,606,214
**06**	**Sendai MMA**	Miyagi Prefecture	Sendai	2,289,656
**07**	**Hiroshima MMA**	Hiroshima Prefecture	Hiroshima	2,064,536
**08**	**Okayama MMA**	Okayama Prefecture	Okayama	1,646,757
09	Kumamoto MA	Kumamoto Prefecture	Kumamoto	1,462,409
**10**	**Niigata MMA**	Niigata Prefecture	Niigata	1,442,958
**11**	**Shizuoka MMA**	Shizuoka Prefecture	Shizuoka	1,427,107
12	Hamamatsu MA	Shizuoka Prefecture	Hamamatsu	1,304,548
13	Kagoshima MA	Kagoshima Prefecture	Kagoshima	1,132,106
14	Matsuyama MA	Ehime Prefecture	Matsuyama	724,048

== Urban Employment Area ==
Japan's MEAs in Taiheiyo Belt

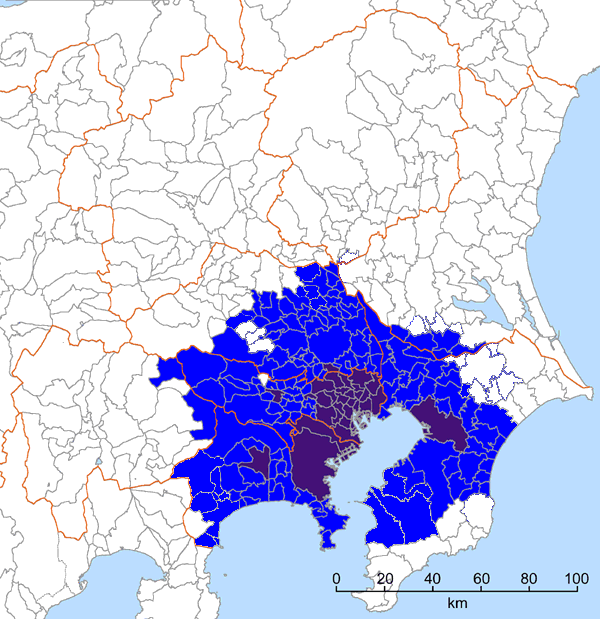
Tokyo MEA

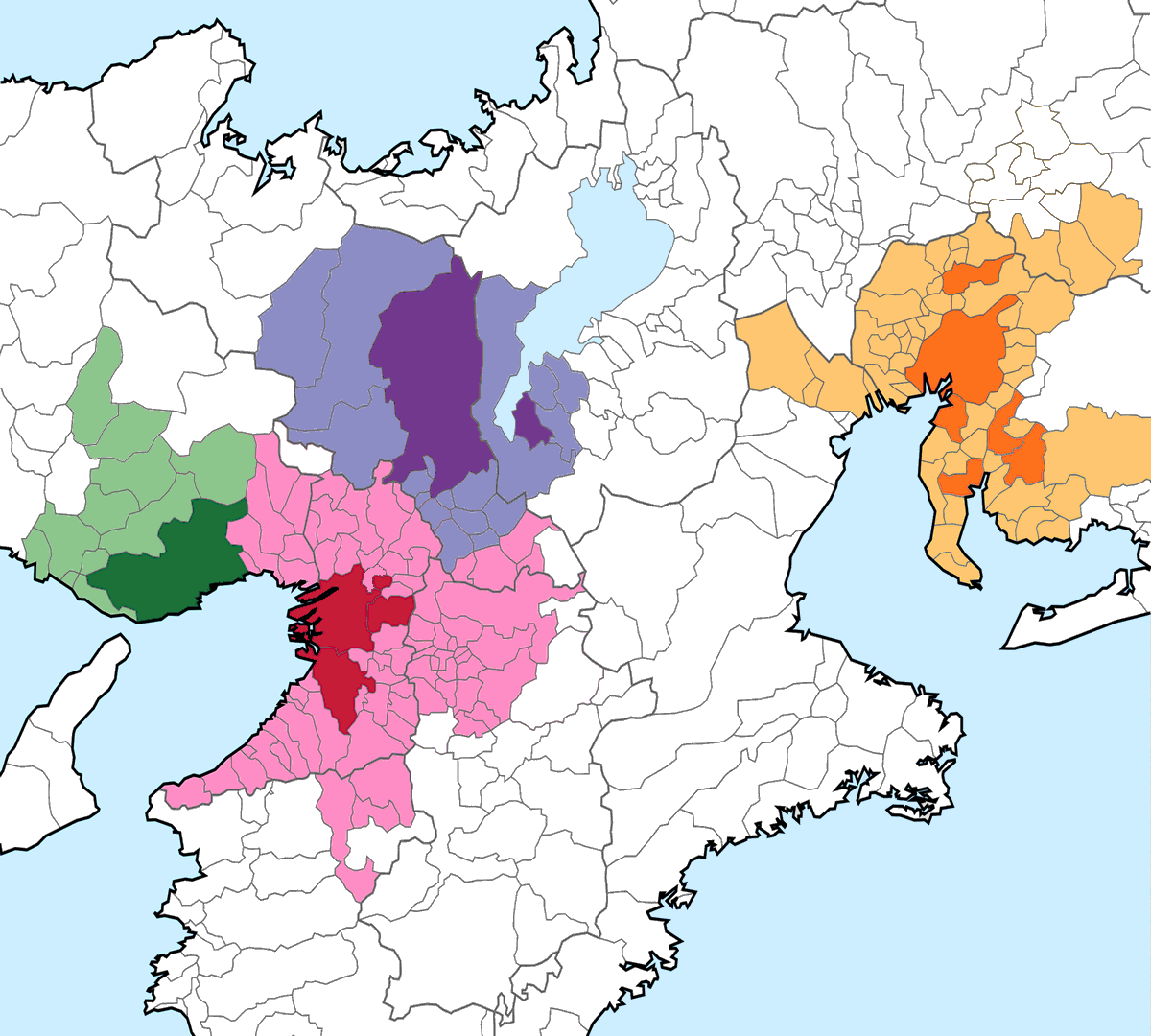
Kobe MEA, Osaka MEA, Kyoto MEA, Nagoya MEA

Urban Employment Area is another definition of metropolitan areas, defined by the Center for Spatial Information Science, the University of Tokyo.

=== 2020 ===
Based on data from Japan’s 2020 Population Census, 104 Major Employment Areas (MEAs) and 108 Micropolitan Employment Areas (McEAs) have been defined in Japan. The ten largest metropolitan areas are listed below in descending order of size.

Rank	Metropolitan area	Prefectures	Central cities	Population
1	Tokyo MEA	Ibaraki, Saitama, Chiba, Tokyo, Kanagawa, Yamanashi	Special wards of Tokyo, Saitama, Chiba, Tachikawa, Musashino, Yokohama, Kawasaki, Atsugi	35,632,624
2	Osaka MEA	Kyoto, Osaka, Hyogo, Nara, Wakayama	Osaka, Sakai, Kadoma, Higashiōsaka	11,874,910
3	Nagoya MEA	Gifu, Aichi, Mie	Nagoya, Handa, Kariya, Anjō, Komaki, Tōkai	6,724,526
4	Kyoto MEA	Shiga, Kyoto	Kyoto, Kusatsu	2,869,395
5	Fukuoka MEA	Fukuoka	Fukuoka	2,667,308
6	Kobe MEA	Hyōgo	Kobe	2,571,898
7	Sapporo MEA	Ishikari and Shiribeshi Subprefectures in Hokkaido	Sapporo	2,344,025
8	Sendai MEA	Miyagi	Sendai	1,621,242
9	Okayama MEA	Okayama	Okayama	1,512,580
10	Hiroshima MEA	Hiroshima	Hiroshima	1,436,874

=== 2015 ===
The Center for Spatial Information Service, the University of Tokyo has defined 100 metropolitan employment areas (MEAs) and 122 micropolitan employment areas (McEAs) for Japan.

Rank	Metropolitan area	Prefecture	Central city	Population
1	Tokyo MEA	Ibaraki, Saitama, Chiba, Tokyo, Kanagawa, Yamanashi	Special wards of Tokyo, Saitama, Chiba, Tachikawa, Musashino, Yokohama, Kawasaki, Atsugi	35,303,778
2	Osaka MEA	Kyoto, Osaka, Hyogo, Nara, Wakayama	Osaka, Sakai, Kadoma, Higashiōsaka	12,078,820
3	Nagoya MEA	Gifu, Aichi, Mie	Nagoya, Handa, Kariya, Anjō, Komaki, Tōkai	6,871,632
4	Kyoto MEA	Shiga, Kyoto	Kyoto, Kusatsu	2,801,044
5	Fukuoka MEA	Fukuoka	Fukuoka	2,565,501
6	Kobe MEA	Hyōgo	Kobe	2,419,973
7	Sapporo MEA	Ishikari and Shiribeshi Subprefecture in Hokkaido	Sapporo, Otaru	2,362,914
8	Sendai MEA	Miyagi	Sendai	1,612,499
9	Okayama MEA	Okayama	Okayama	1,526,503
10	Hiroshima MEA	Hiroshima	Hiroshima	1,431,634

=== 2010 ===
The Japanese Ministry of Economy, Trade and Industry defined 233 areas for the UEAs of Japan.

- MEA: Metropolitan Employment Area
- Source: Ministry of Economy, Trade and Industry of Japan, Center for Spatial Information Science, the University of Tokyo

2010 Standards
Metropolitan area	Prefecture	Central city	Area (km^{2})	GDP (bn. JPY)	Population				
Metropolitan area	Prefecture	Central city	Area (km^{2})	GDP (bn. JPY)	2010	2005	1995	1980	1965
Tokyo MEA	Ibaraki, Saitama, Chiba, Tokyo, Kanagawa, Yamanashi	Special wards of Tokyo, Saitama, Chiba, Tachikawa, Musashino, Yokohama, Kawasaki, Atsugi	10,404	157,820	34,834,167	33,652,998	31,707,138	27,853,640	20,156,066
Osaka MEA	Kyoto, Osaka, Hyōgo, Nara, Wakayama	Osaka, Sakai, Higashiōsaka, Kadoma, Moriguchi	4,291	45,362	12,273,041	12,208,161	12,039,181	11,365,385	8,721,257
Nagoya MEA	Gifu, Aichi, Mie	Nagoya, Komaki	2,792	22,497	5,490,453	5,385,383	5,151,367	4,713,287	3,708,670
Kyoto MEA	Shiga, Kyoto	Kyoto	2,836	10,117	2,679,094	2,653,421	2,582,733	2,395,626	1,897,517
Fukuoka MEA	Fukuoka	Fukuoka	1,283	8,922	2,495,552	2,409,904	2,196,463	1,768,587	1,165,151
Kobe MEA	Hyōgo	Kobe	1,245	8,427	2,431,076	2,417,914	2,309,076	2,130,237	1,697,644
Sapporo MEA	Ishikari Subprefecture, Shiribeshi Subprefecture in Hokkaido	Sapporo, Otaru	3,205	7,438	2,341,599	2,325,653	2,198,255	1,798,624	1,151,946
Sendai MEA	Miyagi	Sendai	2,077	5,414	1,574,942	1,549,746	1,466,989	1,202,186	850,828
Okayama MEA	Okayama	Okayama	2,710	5,539	1,532,146	1,523,286	1,486,785	1,391,802	1,112,534
Maebashi MEA	Gunma	Maebashi, Takasaki, Isesaki	2,653	5,252	1,453,528	1,459,895	1,439,840	1,327,539	1,142,579
Hiroshima MEA	Hiroshima	Hiroshima	1,811	5,414	1,411,848	1,395,530	1,358,060	1,197,465	838,010
Kitakyushu MEA	Fukuoka	Kitakyushu	1,222	4,889	1,370,169	1,392,145	1,429,463	1,459,479	1,397,618
Hamamatsu MEA	Shizuoka	Hamamatsu	2,051	4,763	1,133,879	1,139,189	1,086,360	972,356	818,902
Utsunomiya MEA	Tochigi	Utsunomiya	3,851	4,454	1,120,057	1,121,696	1,093,966	973,728	817,786
Kumamoto MEA	Kumamoto	Kumamoto	1,604	3,490	1,102,398	1,089,366	1,053,231	924,422	795,803
Niigata MEA	Niigata	Niigata	2,138	3,805	1,071,152	1,082,159	1,073,394	1,002,106	875,150
Shizuoka MEA	Shizuoka	Shizuoka	1,677	4,024	1,001,597	1,008,368	1,016,145	966,153	808,584

== See also ==
- Metropolitan Area
- List of cities in Japan
- List of metropolitan areas by population
