= Urban Employment Area =

Definition of metropolitan areas

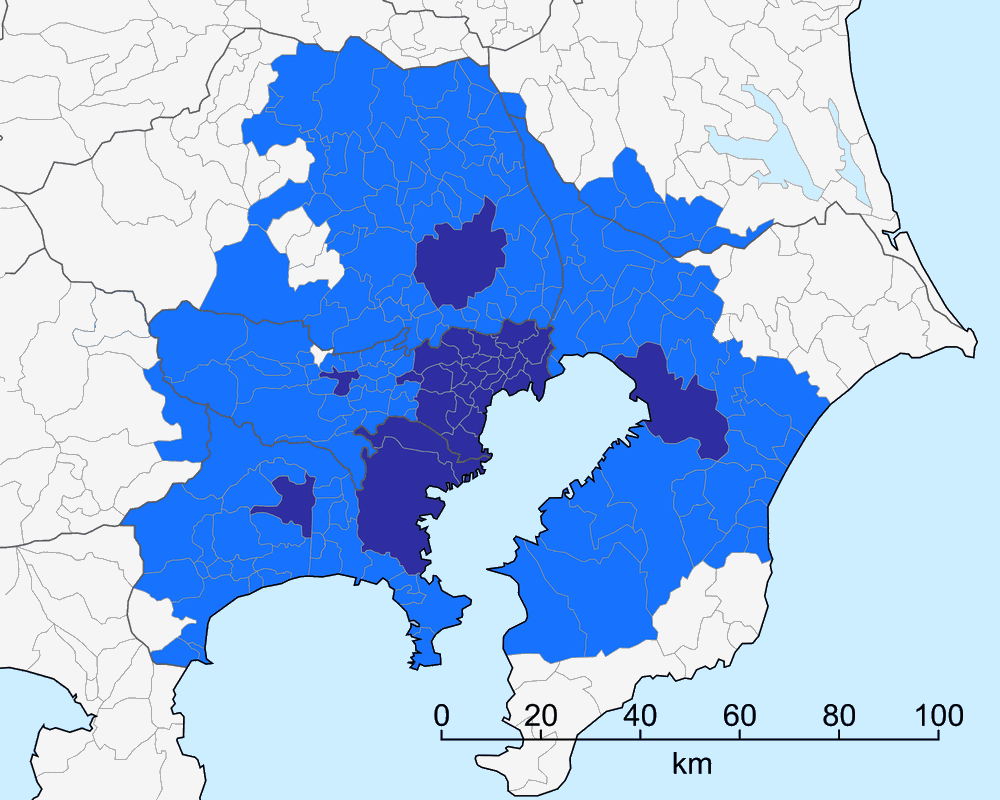
A map of Tokyo MEA in 2015.

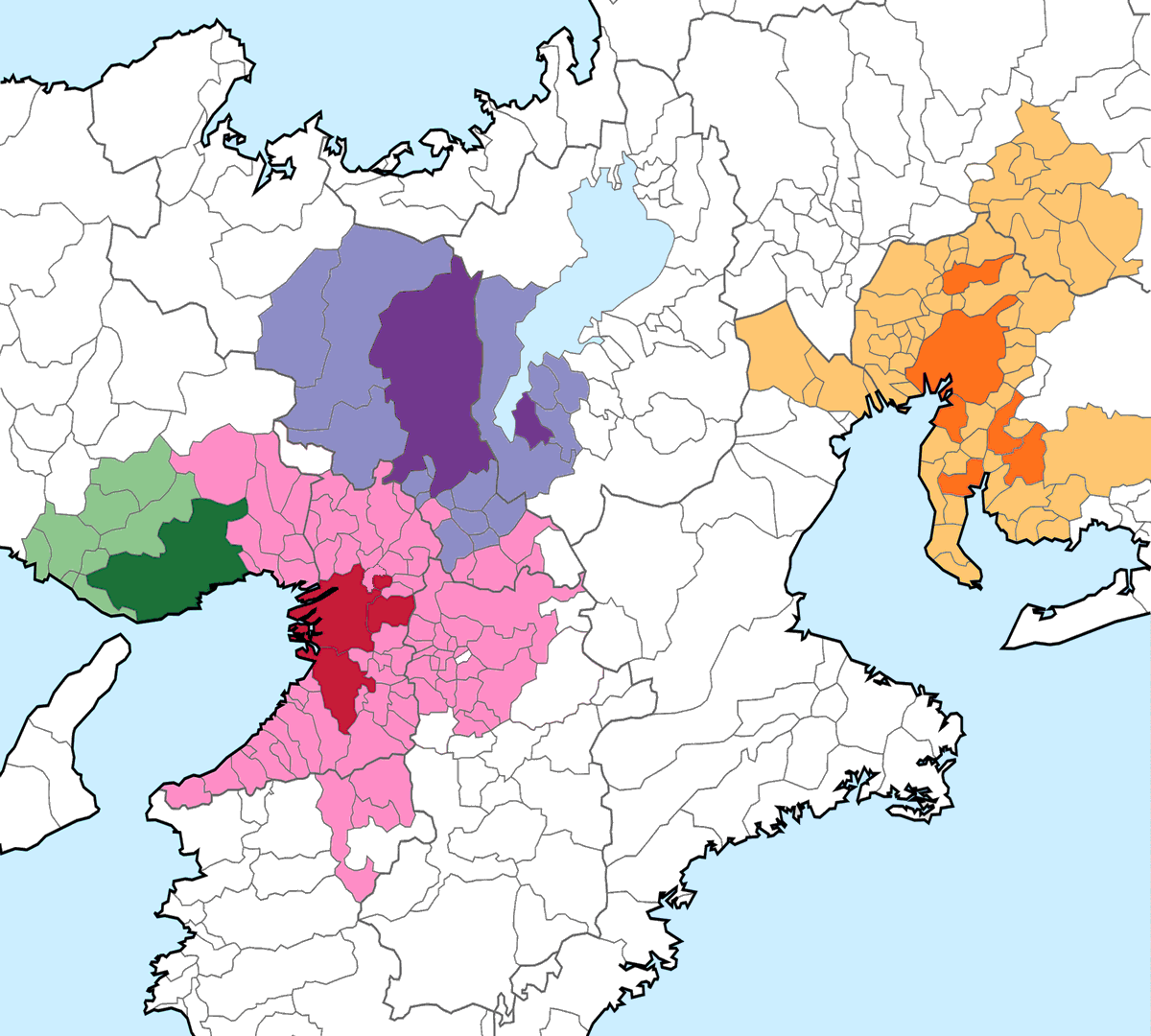
A map showing Kobe, Osaka, Kyoto, and Nagoya MEAs in 2015.

Urban Employment Area (都市雇用圏, Toshi Koyō-ken) is a definition of metropolitan areas used in Japan, defined by the Center for Spatial Information Service of the University of Tokyo. Japan's Ministry of Economy, Trade and Industry defined 233 areas for the UEAs of Japan. It is different from the definition of metropolitan areas defined in census by the Ministry of Internal Affairs and Communications. For the latter scheme, see the List of metropolitan areas in Japan article.

The basic principle of UEA is similar to that of the Statistics Bureau definition; a central city and its associated outlying municipalities with certain numbers of commuters. A UEA with at least 50,000 DID (Densely Inhabited District) population is called Metropolitan Employment Area (大都市雇用圏, Dai-toshi Koyō-ken) or MEA for short in English. A UEA with at least 10,000 and less than 50,000 DID population is called Micropolitan Employment Area (小都市雇用圏, Shō-toshi Koyō-ken) or McEA for short in English.

== Definition ==
Central city

- If a municipality has at least 10,000 DID population, and is not a suburb of any other municipalities, it is defined as a central city.
- Even if a municipality is a suburb of another, it can still be defined as a central city. In this case, a municipality must have workers working there more than those living there. It must also have a DID population of at least 10,000, or a third of the population of the central city.

Suburb

- If municipality A has more than 10% of its population commuting to central city B, A is defined as a (primary) suburb of B.
  - If there are multiple such cities for suburb A, the one with the most commuters from A is defined as A's central city.
- If municipality A has more than 10% of its population commuting to another suburb of central city B, and if no other municipalities have more commuters from A, A is defined as a secondary suburb or lower of B.
- If municipality A has more than 10% of its population commuting to B and vice versa, the one with the higher percentage of commuters is defined as the suburb of the other.
- If a central city comprises multiple municipalities, the number of commuters to all those municipalities are counted for the calculations above.

== Top 100 Urban Employment Areas in Japan ==
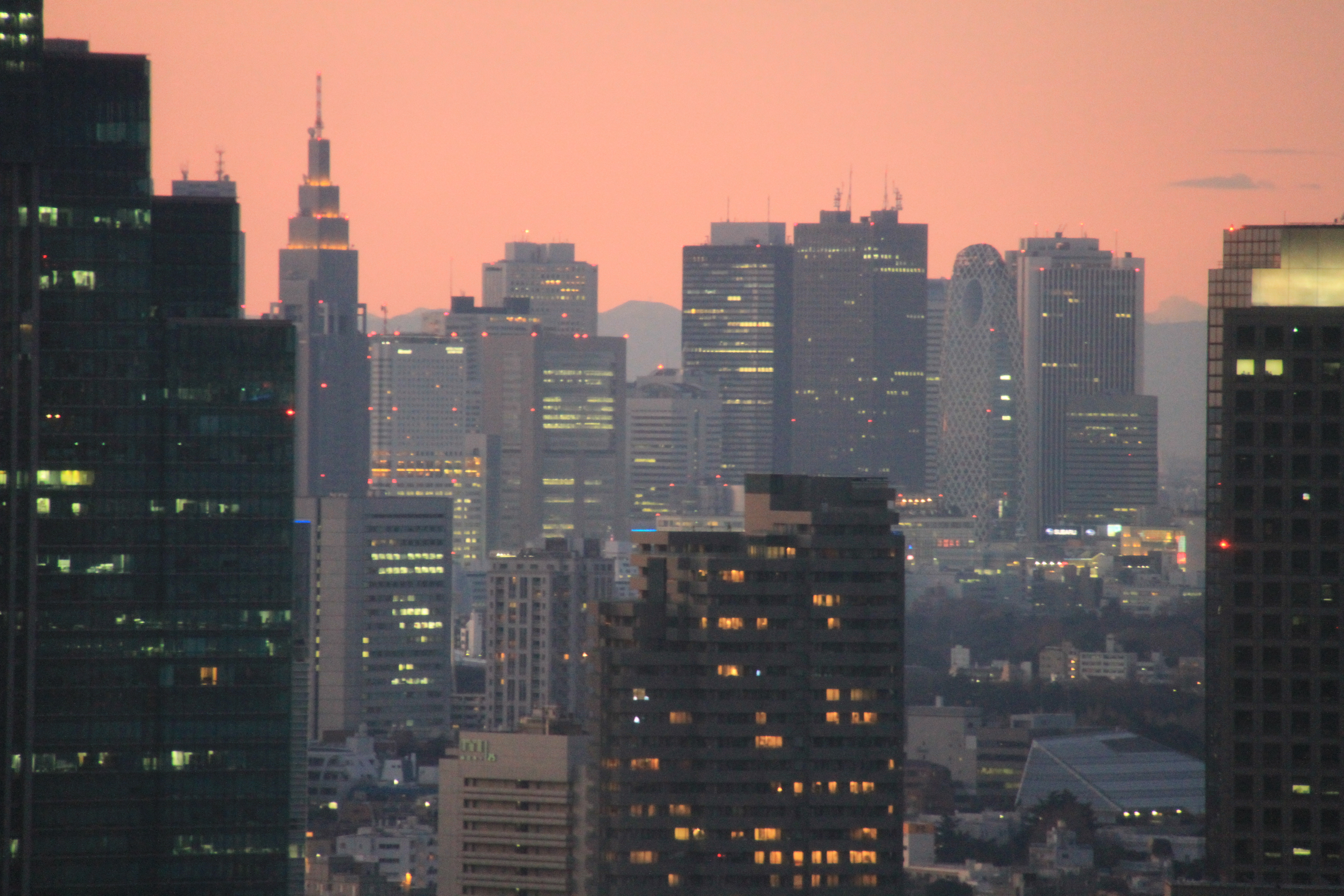
Tokyo MEA

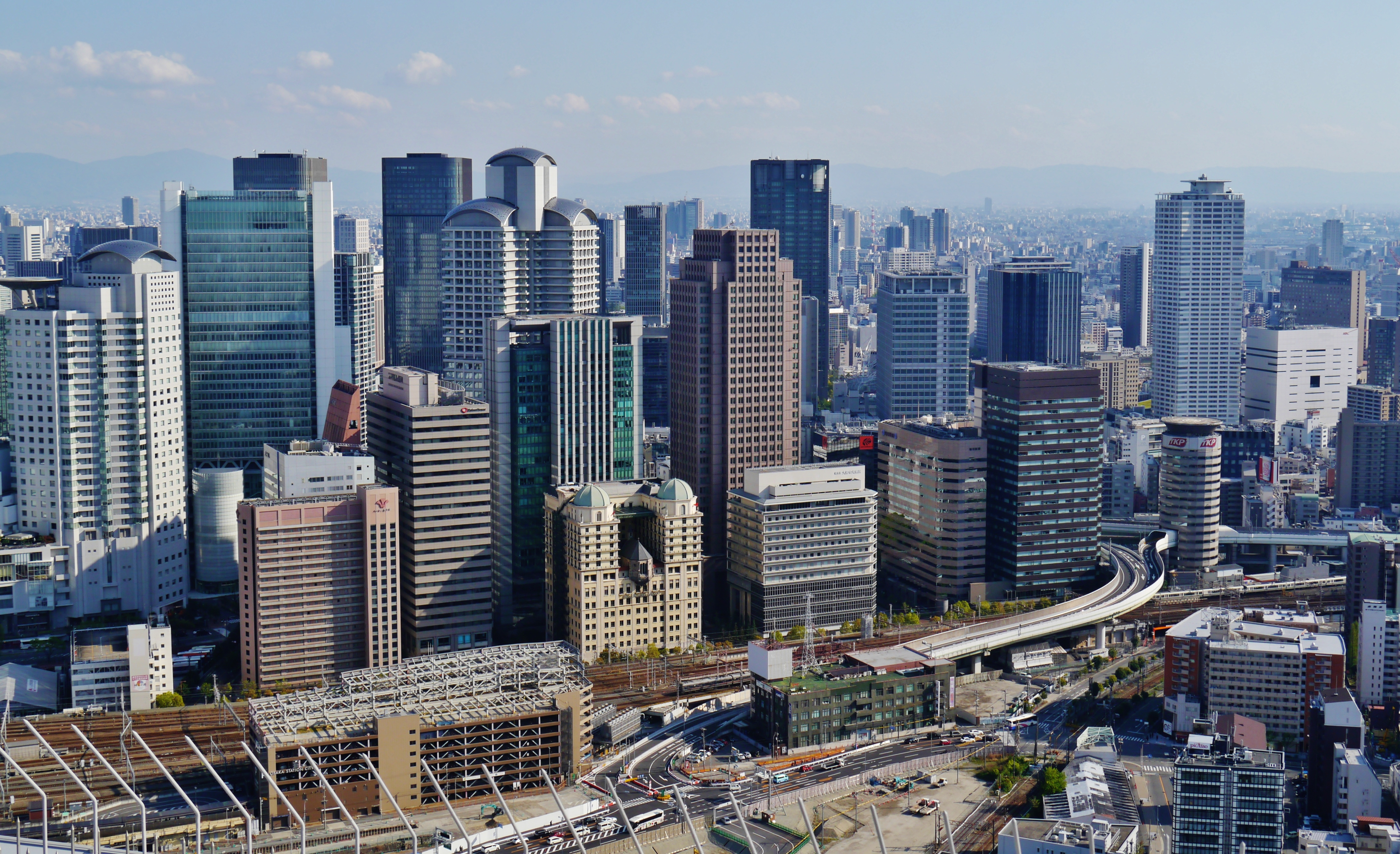
Osaka MEA

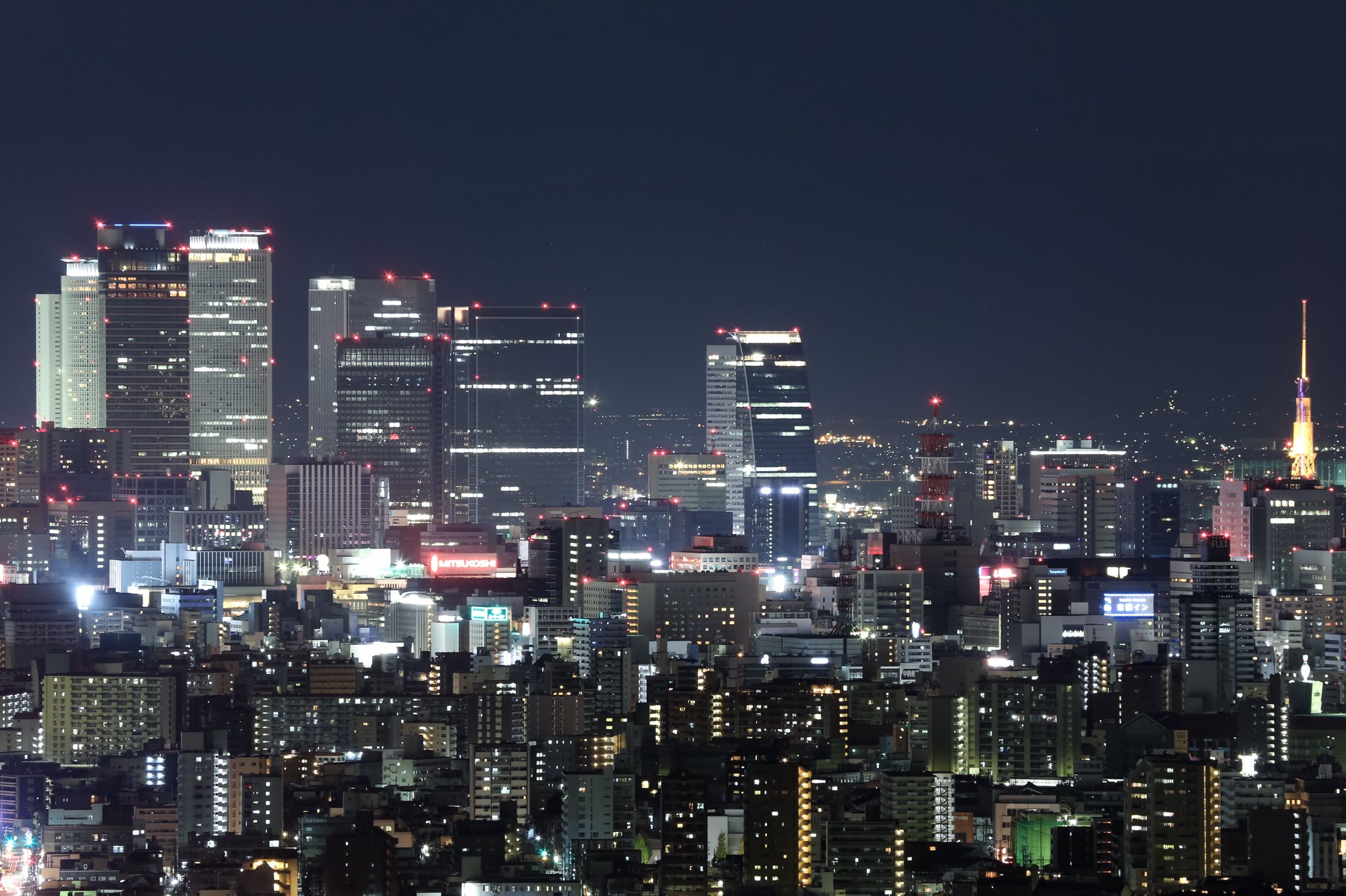
Nagoya MEA

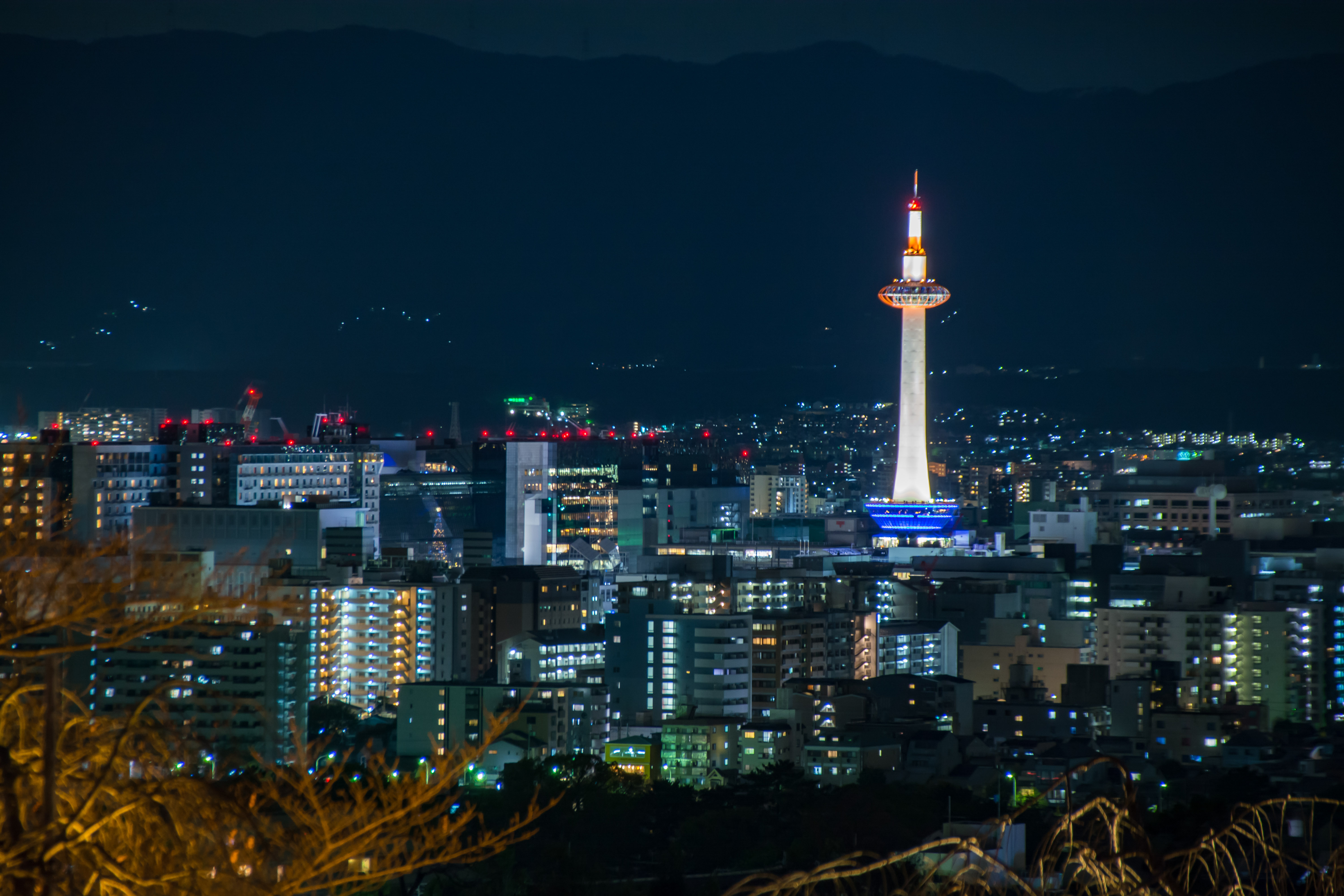
Kyoto MEA

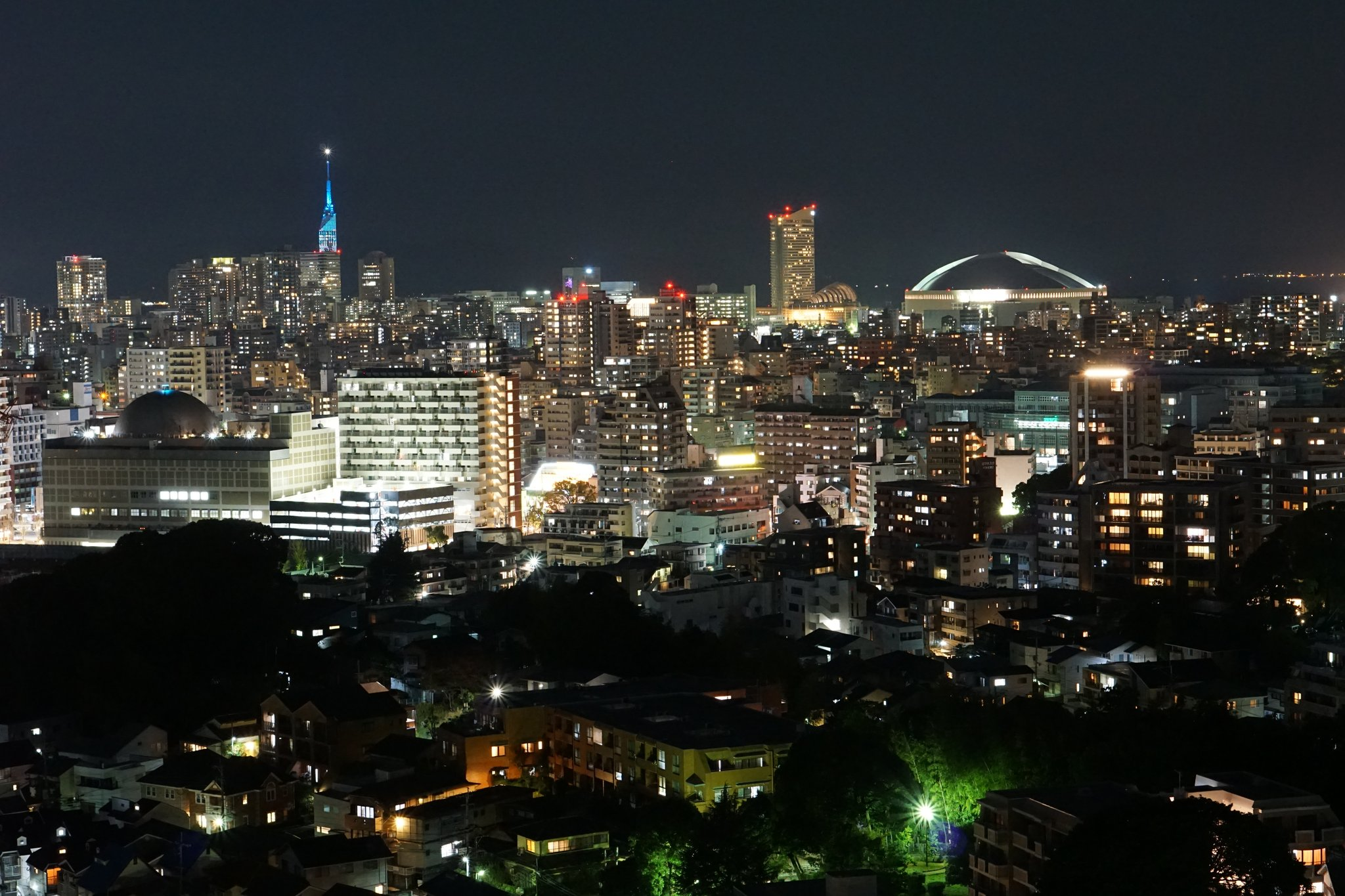
Fukuoka MEA

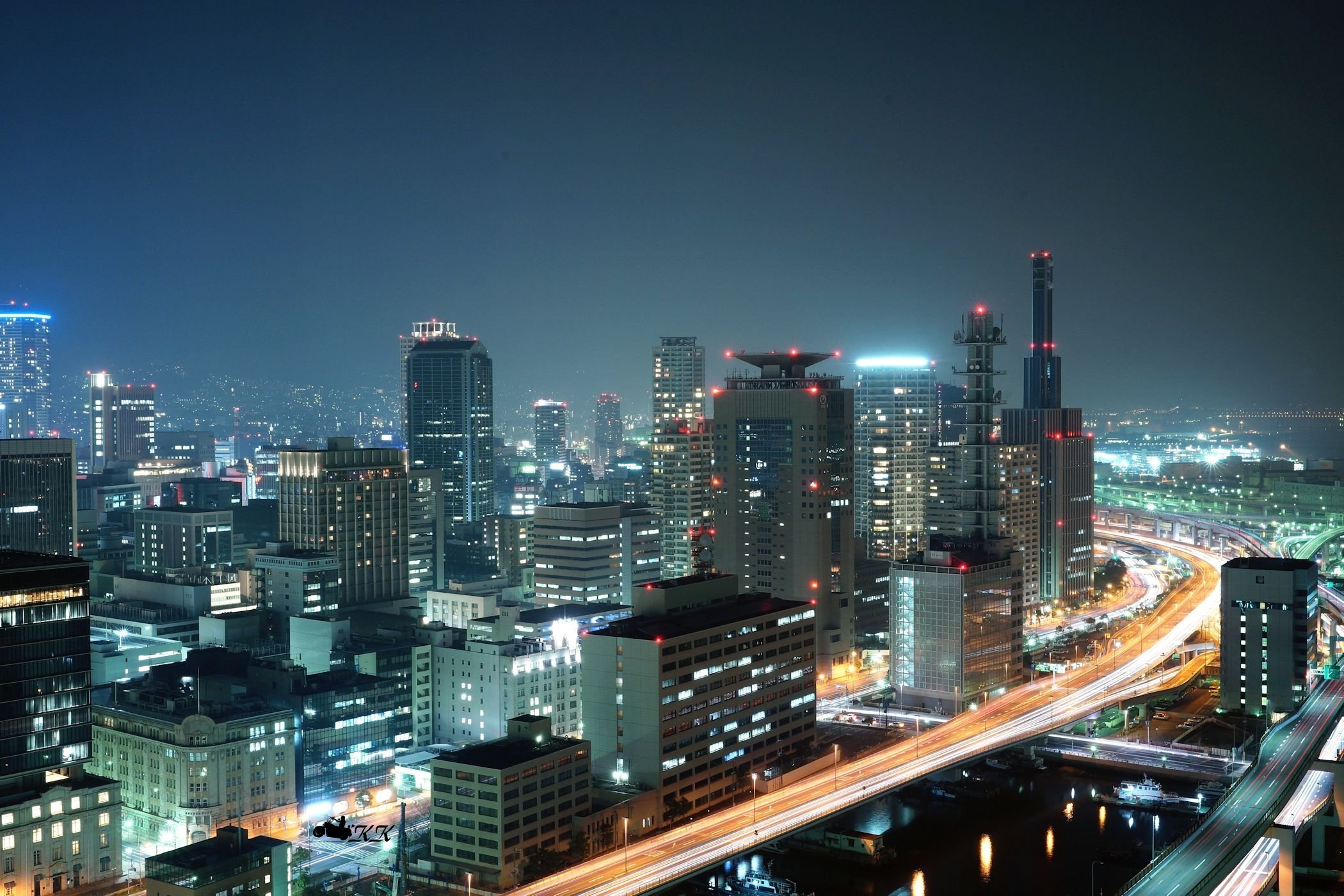
Kobe MEA

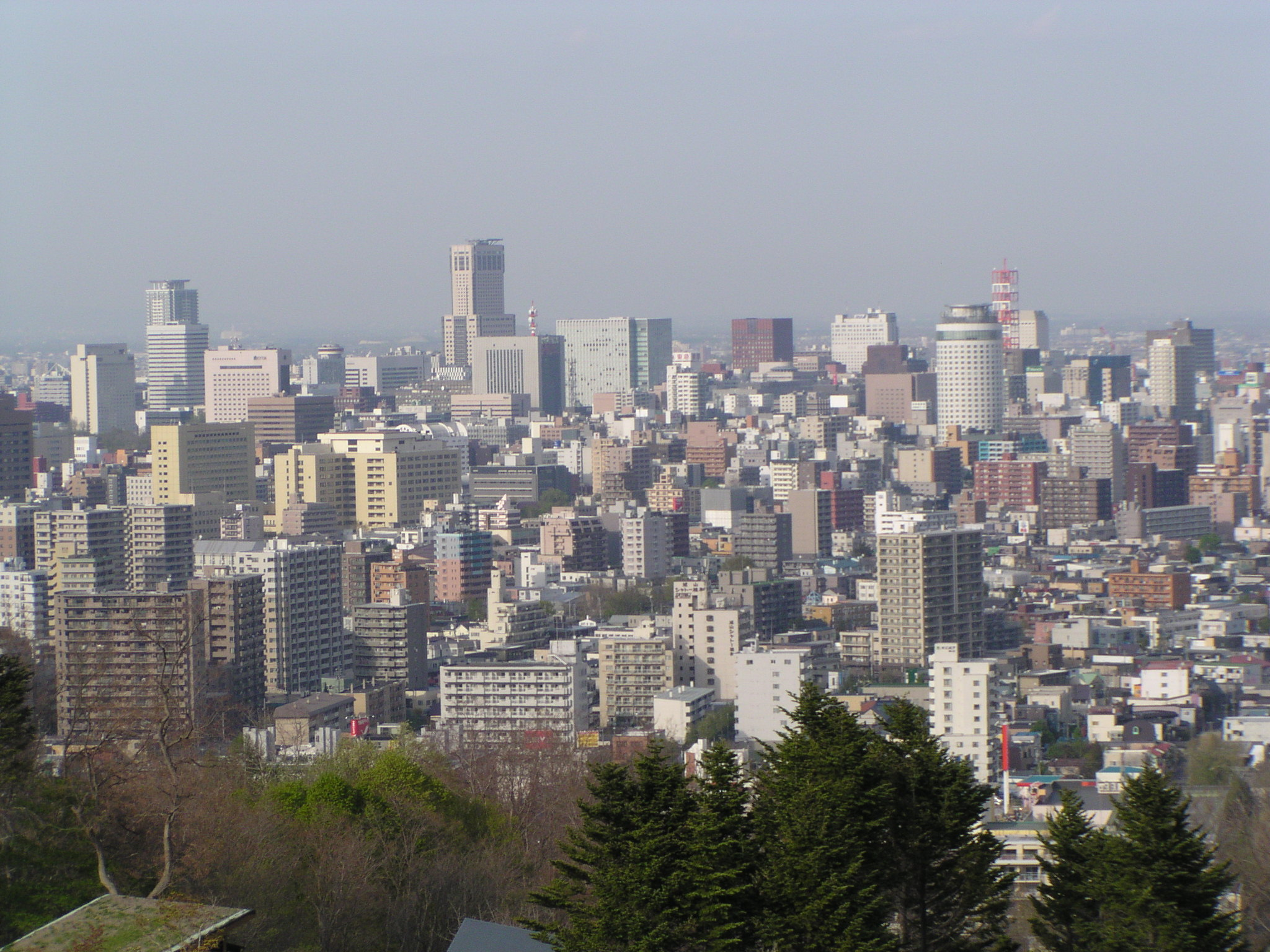
Sapporo MEA

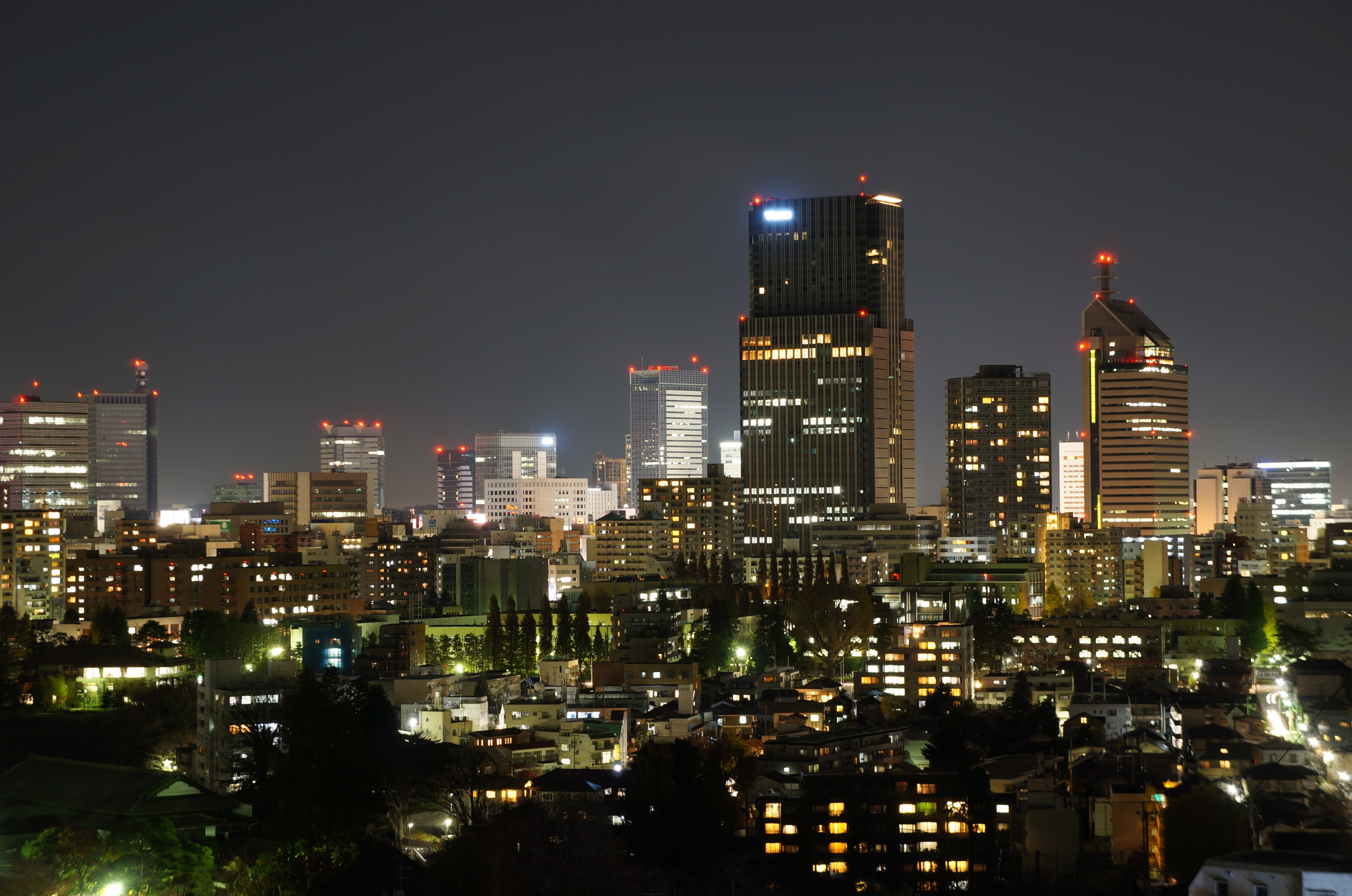
Sendai MEA

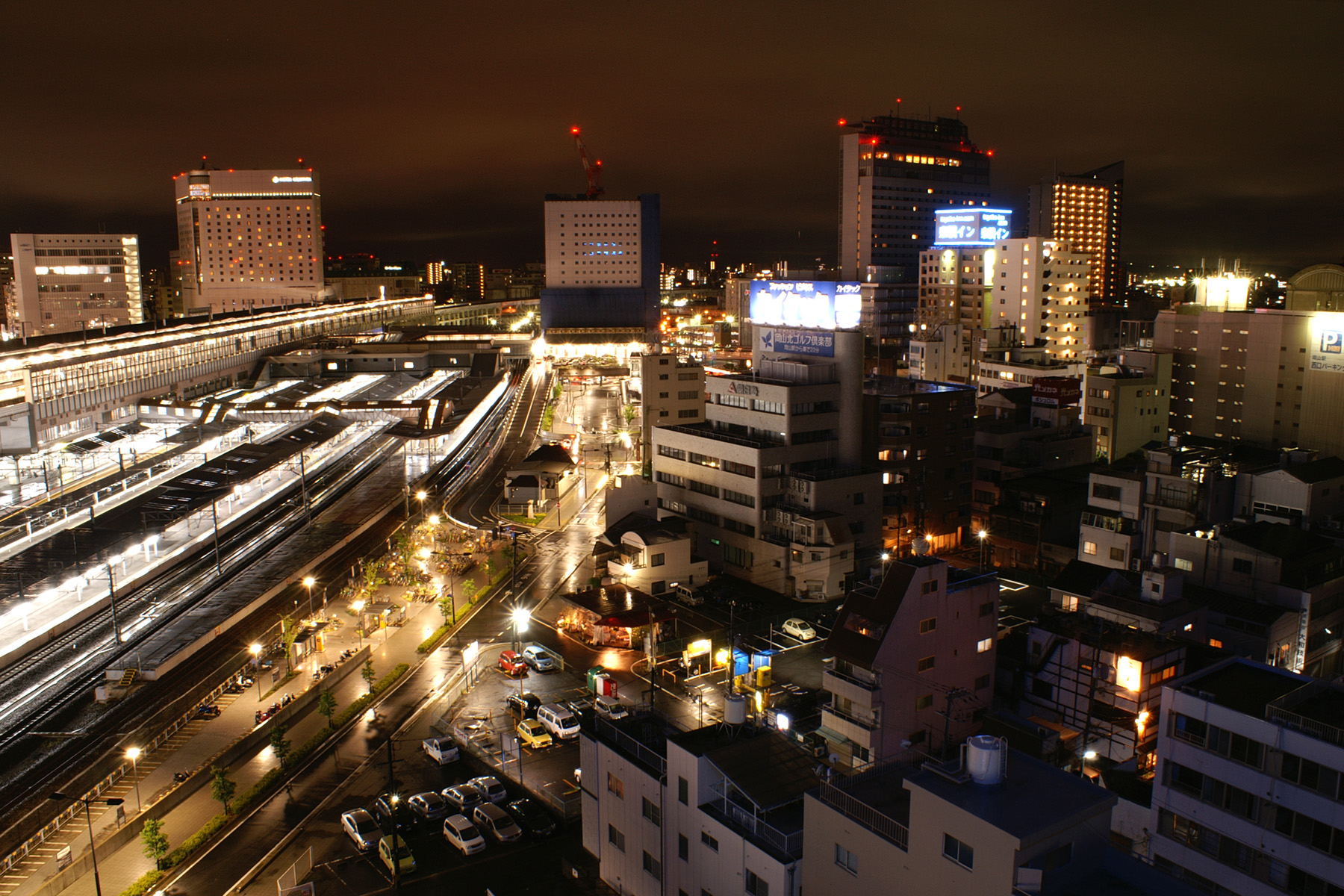
Okayama MEA

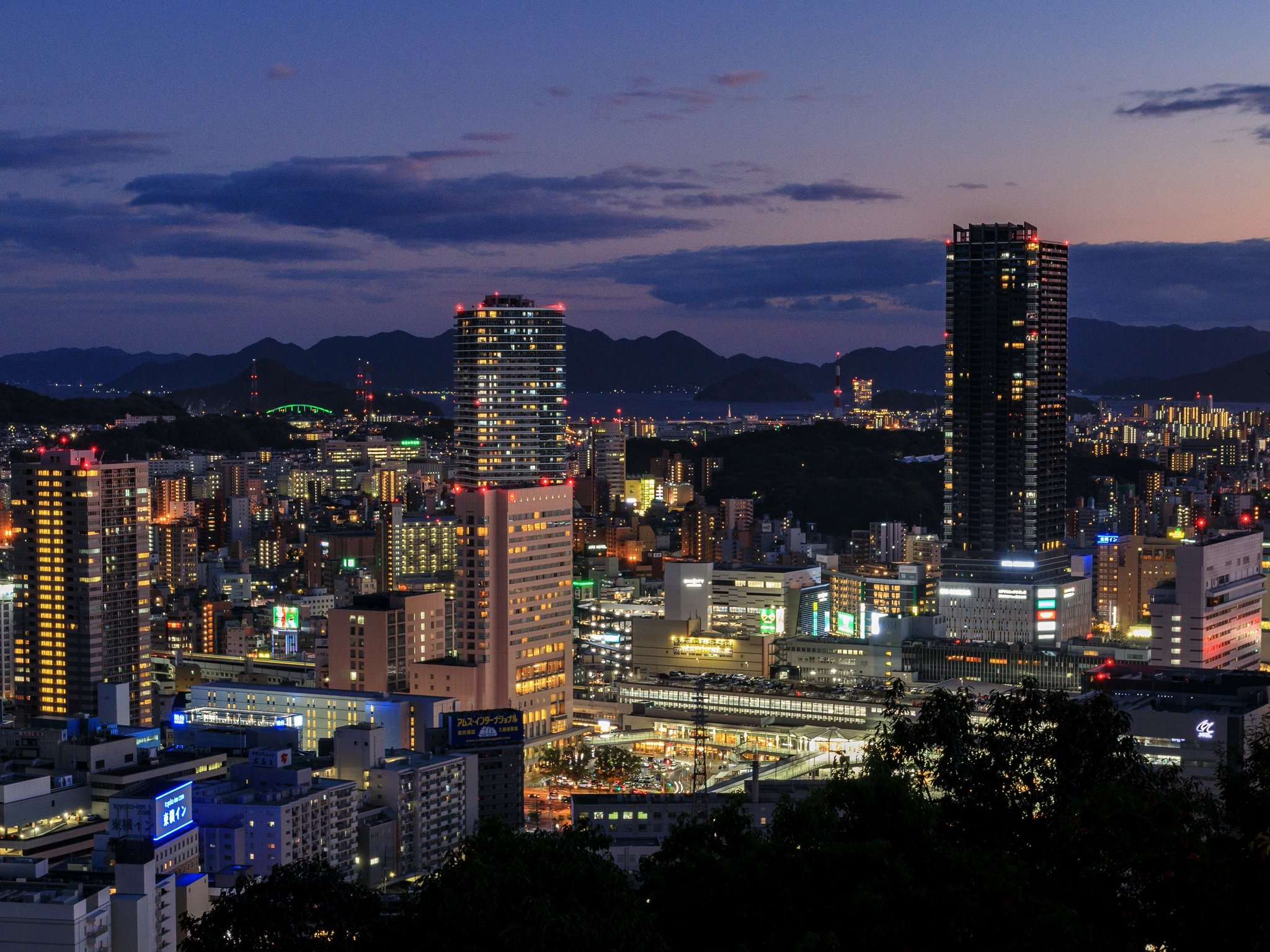
Hiroshima MEA

Source: Urban Employment Area (UEA) Code Table, "地域経済の将来動向分析に関する調査研究" [A study on the future trend analysis of the regional economy] (in Japanese). Archived from the original on 2019-01-09.

- W/L here is jūgyō jōjū jinkōhi (従業常住人口比), the ratio of workers in the area, against the number of workers living in the area.
- DID population here is a population of central city. If an area has multiple central cities, only the most populous one among them is counted.
- A 2015 population decrease from 2005 is written in red figures.
- Metropolitan Employment Area (MEA) is listed on white background. Micropolitan Employment Area (McEA) is listed on yellow background.
- Prefectural capital is numbered with blue background.
- 1980 ranks include Kurashiki MEA, which was merged with Okayama MEA in 2000. Those under No. 100 are marked as "-".

2015	1980	Name	Pop. (2015)	Pop. (1980)	W/L (2015)	GDP (in billion US$) (2010)
1	1	Tokyo MEA	35,303,778	26,624,003	1.72	1,797.9
2	2	Osaka MEA	12,078,820	11,170,018	1.82	516.8
3	3	Nagoya MEA	6,871,632	4,538,832	1.23	256.3
4	4	Kyoto MEA	2,801,044	2,361,205	1.14	115.3
5	6	Fukuoka MEA	2,565,501	1,773,129	1.22	101.6
6	5	Kobe MEA	2,419,973	2,047,561	1.03	96.0
7	7	Sapporo MEA	2,362,914	1,751,996	1.01	84.7
8	10	Sendai MEA	1,612,499	1,248,616	1.11	61.7
9	14	Okayama MEA	1,526,503	750,188	1.05	63.1
10	9	Hiroshima MEA	1,431,634	1,327,198	1.02	61.3
11	8	Kitakyushu MEA	1,314,276	1,524,747	1.04	55.7
12	54	Maebashi MEA	1,263,034	341,331	1.07	59.8
13	13	Hamamatsu MEA	1,129,296	825,503	0.98	54.3
14	12	Kumamoto MEA	1,111,596	836,892	1.02	39.8
15	25	Utsunomiya MEA	1,103,745	547,545	1.06	50.7
16	32	Toyama MEA	1,066,328	504,353	1.10	49.5
17	15	Niigata MEA	1,060,013	726,983	1.01	43.3
18	11	Shizuoka MEA	988,056	966,074	1.05	45.8
19	79	Tsukuba MEA	843,402	216,337	1.18	37.1
20	20	Naha MEA	830,532	616,010	1.24	26.8
21	16	Gifu MEA	823,219	711,981	1.03	32.2
22	22	Takamatsu MEA	819,327	592,555	1.07	34.7
23	24	Nagasaki MEA	785,108	553,101	1.06	27.9
24	17	Himeji MEA	773,389	709,219	1.03	33.6
25	30	Fukuyama MEA	753,528	517,514	1.00	31.5
26	19	Kanazawa MEA	747,780	626,523	1.13	31.7
27	21	Oita MEA	737,936	608,653	1.03	28.9
28	18	Kagoshima MEA	724,236	662,737	1.02	26.4
29	28	Mito MEA	687,734	532,911	1.16	30.3
30	27	Toyohashi MEA	670,144	540,880	0.95	31.0
31	36	Tokushima MEA	659,744	478,772	1.14	28.4
32	39	Fukui MEA	646,813	454,495	1.17	28.7
33	26	Matsuyama MEA	637,608	542,188	1.01	24.5
34	29	Yokkaichi MEA	623,210	522,233	1.08	29.1
35	94	Ota MEA	613,825	161,945	1.16	21.6
36	31	Nagano MEA	589,549	514,136	1.06	24.9
37	37	Kofu MEA	586,986	476,543	1.22	25.2
38	23	Wakayama MEA	569,758	566,668	1.08	24.6
39	55	Koriyama MEA	544,662	341,004	1.08	20.2
40	40	Yamagata MEA	534,571	415,965	1.10	20.0
41	34	Kochi MEA	519,390	490,401	1.04	17.5
42	48	Miyazaki MEA	502,401	356,771	1.01	18.2
43	66	Tsu MEA	499,709	280,045	1.05	23.8
44	35	Numazu MEA	497,258	487,606	1.11	22.9
45	56	Toyota MEA	484,352	340,596	1.21	28.3
46	45	Morioka MEA	470,414	382,706	1.10	17.9
47	53	Fukushima MEA	451,044	343,063	1.06	18.0
48	46	Matsumoto MEA	447,802	371,850	1.09	18.5
49	44	Kurume MEA	431,897	384,264	0.98	16.8
50	60	Saga MEA	398,217	304,703	1.12	15.2
51	43	Akita MEA	397,801	384,718	1.08	16.0
52	42	Asahikawa MEA	388,701	394,532	1.01	14.3
53	52	Fuji MEA	387,236	345,720	1.01	18.1
54	68	Nagaoka MEA	356,767	274,394	1.04	15.7
55	51	Iwaki MEA	350,237	347,408	0.97	13.0
56	47	Hitachi MEA	349,111	368,405	1.16	17.2
57	41	Hakodate MEA	340,489	395,403	1.05	12.7
58	-	Narita MEA	328,796	-	1.51	16.7
59	75	Okinawa MEA	327,550	236,398	0.95	7.1
60	58	Hachinohe MEA	324,451	331,608	1.08	12.5
61	65	Ogaki MEA	313,740	280,945	1.06	13.0
62	102	Yamaguchi MEA	313,364	147,867	1.02	14.6
63	57	Aomori MEA	310,640	336,677	1.03	12.3
64	61	Sasebo MEA	298,023	304,678	1.02	11.1
65	67	Hirosaki MEA	291,789	278,234	1.11	10.6
66	82	Matsue MEA	284,790	205,031	1.06	11.7
67	-	Kamisu McEA	270,079	-	1.16	-
68	49	Shimonoseki MEA	268,517	348,875	0.98	12.1
69	64	Shunan MEA	267,340	295,506	1.08	13.0
70	78	Obihiro MEA	263,344	221,659	1.07	9.9
71	59	Kure MEA	252,891	320,342	0.99	11.0
72	139	Nasushiobara McEA	250,876	100,083	0.92	-
73	87	Miyakonojo MEA	236,290	189,065	1.08	8.5
74	69	Omuta MEA	234,581	254,723	1.08	8.6
75	74	Tottori MEA	232,610	239,972	1.06	8.4
76	76	Ube MEA	232,100	229,729	0.99	10.7
77	70	Yonago MEA	231,746	246,581	1.06	8.1
78	77	Joetsu MEA	230,186	227,947	1.00	9.9
79	-	Higashiomi McEA	228,704	-	0.90	-
80	84	Niihama MEA	228,077	196,483	1.04	9.3
81	83	Aizuwakamatsu MEA	223,807	197,672	1.11	9.0
82	108	Komatsu McEA	222,986	141,582	1.01	-
83	-	Higashihiroshima MEA	219,333	-	0.98	-
84	86	Oyama MEA	218,354	190,194	1.00	9.7
85	130	Sanjo MEA	215,037	109,386	1.10	9.7
86	-	Koga MEA	212,776	-	0.90	9.2
87	80	Ueda McEA	212,314	205,775	1.02	8.8
88	211	Osaki McEA	205,925	65,525	0.95	-
89	72	Kushiro MEA	205,177	242,331	1.00	8.2
90	144	Nakatsu McEA	203,101	97,817	1.05	-
91	122	Suwa McEA	198,475	114,705	1.13	-
92	214	Kakegawa McEA	193,943	64,843	1.04	-
93	85	Ishinomaki MEA	193,051	194,680	1.07	7.9
94	184	Kitakami McEA	191,213	76,633	1.09	-
95	96	Tomakomai MEA	190,477	158,191	1.01	7.4
96	73	Muroran MEA	189,696	241,371	1.20	7.4
97	88	Iizuka McEA	189,195	188,420	1.03	7.2
98	170	Ina McEA	184,305	84,003	0.99	-
99	97	Ise MEA	183,793	157,669	0.96	7.9
100	104	Tsuyama McEA	182,412	144,230	1.03	-

These areas have multiple central cities. Municipal names are as of 2015.

- Tokyo: 8; Special wards of Tokyo, Saitama, Chiba, Tachikawa, Musashino, Yokohama, Kawasaki, and Atsugi.
- Osaka: 4; Osaka, Sakai, Moriguchi, Kadoma, and Higashiosaka.
- Nagoya: 6; Nagoya, Komaki, Tokai, Handa, Kariya, and Anjō.
- Kyoto: 2; Kyoto and Kusatsu.
- Sapporo: 2; Sapporo and Otaru.
- Maebashi: 2; Maebashi and Takasaki
- Naha: 2; Naha and Urasoe.
- Tsukuba: 2; Tsukuba and Tsuchiura.
- Ota: 2; Ota and Oizumi.
- Kamisu: 2; Kamisu and Kashima.
- Nasushiobara: 2; Nasushiobara and Otawara.
- Sanjō: 2; Sanjō and Tsubame.

These areas changed their names between 1980 and 2000, as the most populated central cities have changed.

- Tsuchiura MEA changed to Tsukuba MEA after 1995.
- Kimitsu MEA changed to Kisarazu MEA after 1990.

== See also ==
- List of metropolitan areas in Japan by population
- List of Japanese cities by population
- Daily urban system
