= Greater Kyoto =

Kyoto metropolitan area
- Municipal partnership
- Interactive map of Kyoto metropolitan area
- Country: Japan
- Membership: 30 municipalities: Ōtsu; Ōmihachiman; Kusatsu; Moriyama; Ritto; Koka; Yasu; Konan; Takashima; Higashiōmi; Hino; Ryūō; Kyoto City; Uji; Kameoka; Jōyō; Mukō; Nagaokakyō; Yawata; Kyōtanabe; Nantan; Kizugawa; Ōyamazaki; Kumiyama; Ide; Ujitawara; Seika; Kyotamba; Takatsuki; Shimamoto
- Established: 1995

Area
  - Total: 5,189.41 km^{2} (2,003.64 sq mi)

Population (2020)
  - Total: 3,783,014
  - Density: 728.987/km^{2} (1,888.07/sq mi)
- Website: www.city.kyoto.lg.jp/sogo/page/0000223730.html

Greater Kyoto isu, the capital of Shiga Prefecture.

The (京津). The name Keiji is constructed by extracting a representative kanji from Kyoto (京都) and Shiga (滋賀). The name Keishin is constructed by extracting a representative kanji from Kyoto (京都) and Ōtsu (大津).

== Definitions ==
Light blue represents the Kyoto metropolitan area defined by Kyōto Toshiken Jichitai Network, blue represents Kyoto–Kusatsu MEA, and dark blue represents Kyoto City.

=== Urban Employment Area ===
Kyoto–Kusatsu MEA
- Urban Employment Area
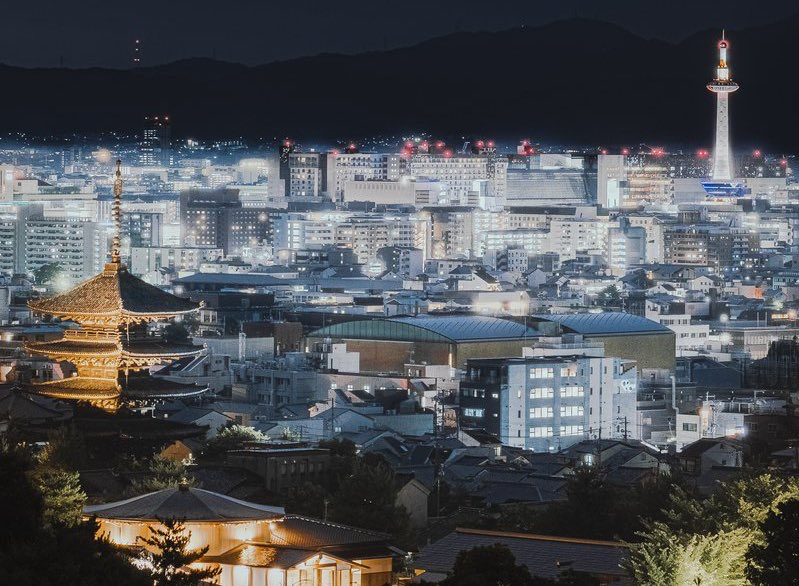
- Kyoto Tower and Downtown Kyoto
- Interactive map of Kyoto–Kusatsu MEA
- Coordinates: 35°0′N 135°46′E
- Country: Japan
- Prefectures: Kyoto Prefecture; Shiga Prefecture
- Core cities: Kyoto City; Kusatsu

Area (2015)
  - Total: 2,959.11 km^{2} (1,142.52 sq mi)

Population (2015)
  - Total: 2,801,044
  - Rank: 4th in Japan
  - Density: 946.583/km^{2} (2,451.64/sq mi)
- GMP: ¥10.12 trillion (2010)

Historical population
Year	Pop.	±%
1980	2,361,205	—
1990	2,485,352	+5.3%
1995	2,539,639	+2.2%
2000	2,583,304	+1.7%
2005	2,560,850	−0.9%
2010	2,679,049	+4.6%
2015	2,801,044	+4.6%

The greater Kyoto area is defined by Urban Employment Area as Kyoto–Kusatsu Metropolitan Employment Area (Kyoto–Kusatsu MEA). The metropolitan area had a total population of 2,801,044 as of 2015 and is the fourth-largest in Japan. The cities and towns of the metropolitan area with their 2020 populations are listed below.

- Kyoto Prefecture
  - Kyoto City (1,463,723)
  - Uji (179,630)
  - Kameoka (86,174)
  - Nagaokakyō (80,608)
  - Jōyō (74,607)
  - Kyōtanabe (73,753)
  - Mukō (56,859)
  - Nantan (31,629)
  - Kumiyama (15,250)
  - Ōyamazaki (15,953)
  - Kyotamba (12,907)
  - Ujitawara (8,911)
  - Ide (7,406)
- Shiga Prefecture
  - Ōtsu (345,070)
  - Kusatsu (143,913)
  - Moriyama (83,236)
  - Ritto (68,820)
  - Yasu (50,513)

=== Municipalities network ===
Historical population
Year	Pop.	±%
1990	3,263,277	—
1995	3,341,125	+2.4%
2000	3,401,130	+1.8%
2005	3,602,596	+5.9%
2010	3,795,678	+5.4%
2015	3,789,750	−0.2%
2020	3,783,014	−0.2%

A wider metropolitan area based on commuting patterns is also defined by Kyōto Toshiken Jichitai Nettowāku Kaigi (京都都市圏自治体ネットワーク会議, Conference of Kyoto metropolitan area municipalities network) as the Kyoto metropolitan area. This area consists of 13 cities and towns of Shiga Prefecture, Kyoto Prefecture, and Osaka Prefecture, in addition to Kyoto MEA. The total population as of 2020 for the region was estimated at 3,785,351. The following areas, along with the above Kyoto MEA, are included in the Kyoto metropolitan area, with their 2020 populations:

- Kyoto Prefecture
  - Yawata (70,433)
  - Kizugawa (77,907)
  - Seika (36,198)
- Shiga Prefecture
  - Takashima (46,377)
  - Konan (54,460)
  - Koka (88,358)
  - Ōmihachiman (81,122)
  - Higashiōmi (112,819)
  - Hino (20,964)
  - Ryūō (11,789)
- Osaka Prefecture
  - Takatsuki (352,698)
  - Shimamoto (30,927)

== Geography ==
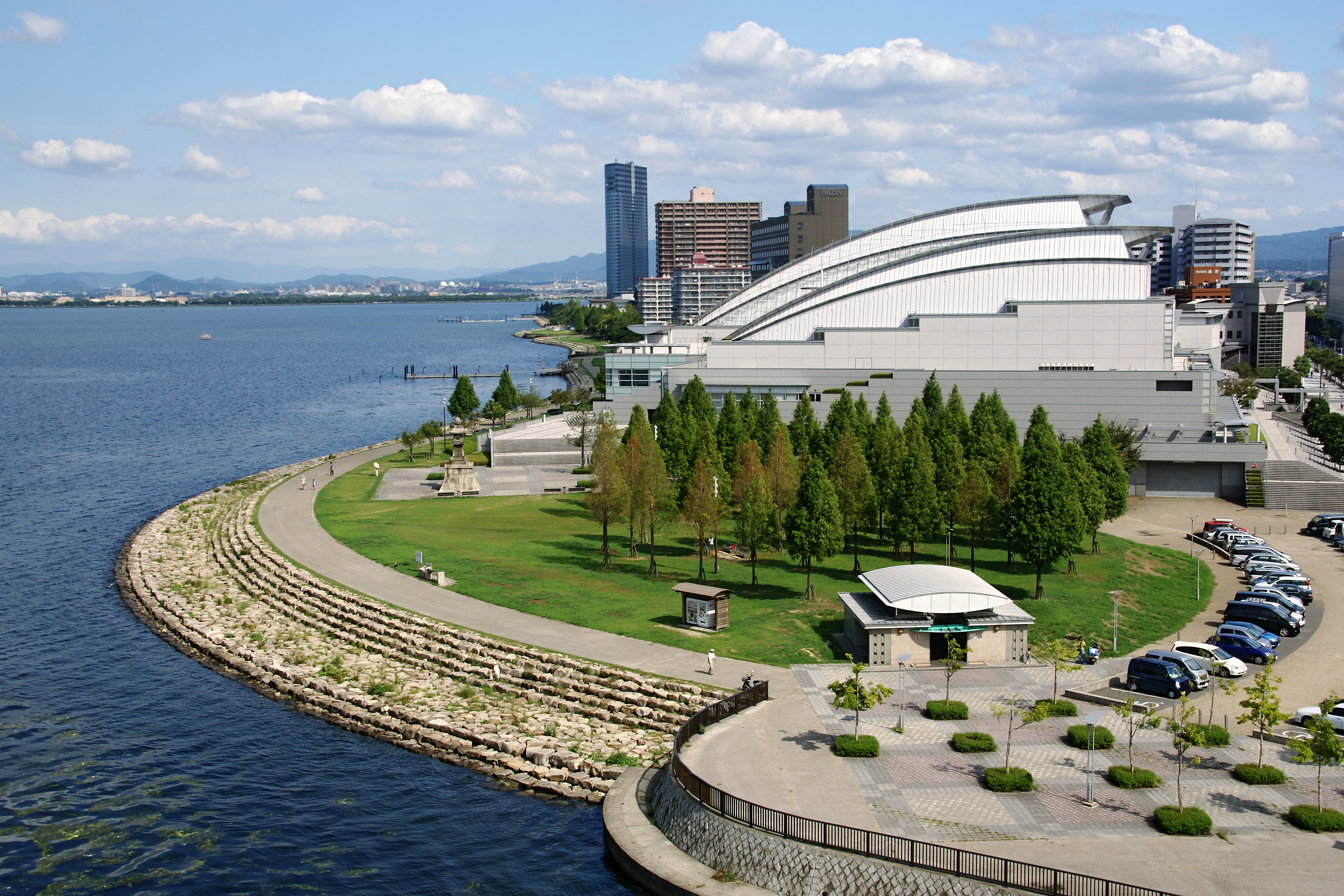
Biwako Hall in Ōtsu

- Lake Biwa – the largest lake in Japan
- Ohmi Basin – Shiga Prefecture
- Kyoto Basin – the southern part of Kyoto Prefecture
- Mount Hiei – mountain on the border between Kyoto and Ōtsu
- Seta River and Uji River
- Kizu River
- Yasu River
- Katsura River

== Higher Education ==
48 universities and colleges in the area participate in the Consortium of Universities in Kyoto.

- Bukkyo University – 5 campuses in Kyoto and Nantan
- Doshisha University – 2 campuses in Kyoto and Kyōtanabe
- Heian Jogakuin University – 2 campuses in Kyoto and Takatsuki
- Kyoto University – 3 campuses in Kyoto and Uji
- Kyoto University of Advanced Science – 2 campuses in Kyoto and Kameoka
- Ritsumeikan University – 4 campuses in Kyoto, Kusatsu, and Ibaraki
- Ryukoku University – 3 campuses in Kyoto and Ōtsu

== Sports ==
- Kyoto Sanga FC – a football club
- Reilac Shiga FC – a football club
- Kyoto Hannaryz – a basketball team
- Shiga Lakes – a basketball team
- Kyoto Marathon
- Kyoto Racecourse
- Sanga Stadium by Kyocera

== Media ==
- Kyoto Shimbun – newspaper
- KBS Kyoto – TV and radio station
- BBC Biwako – TV station
- FM-Kyoto – radio station
- PHP Institute – publishing house
- Leaf Publications – publishing house

== Transportation ==
=== Rail ===
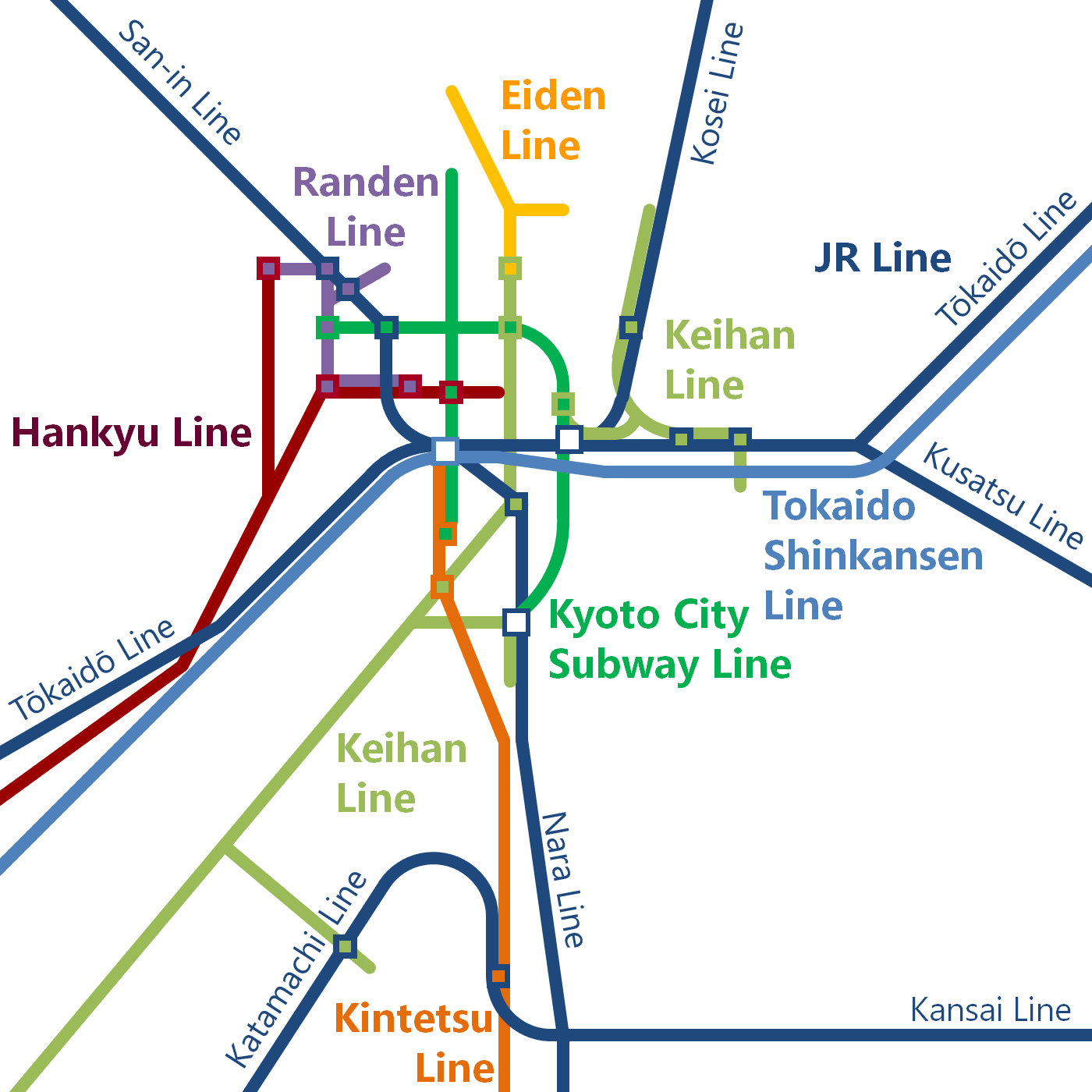
Railway map around Kyoto City

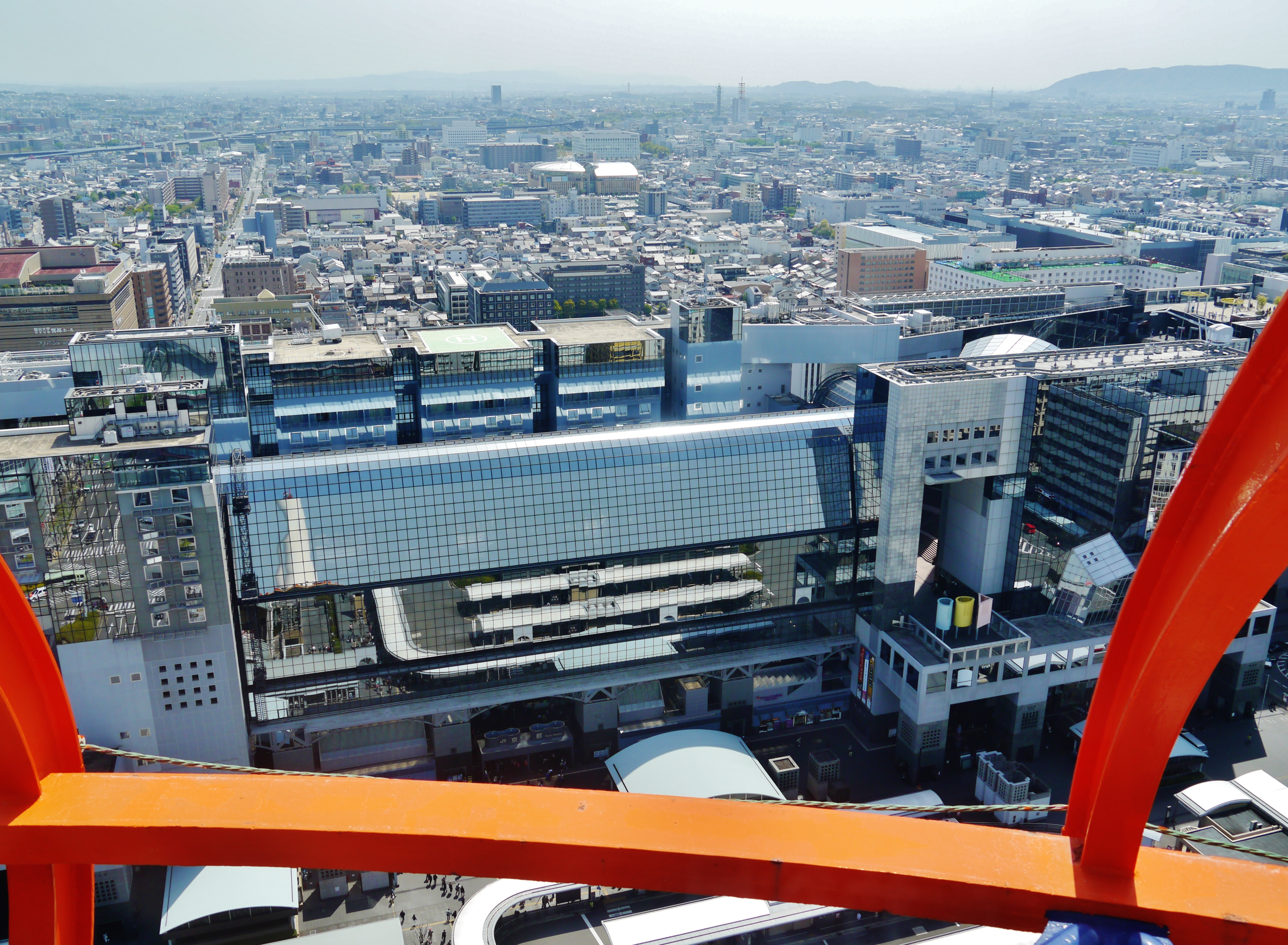
View of Kyoto Station from Kyoto Tower

Kyōto Station is a hub of the rail network in the area.

- Tōkaidō Shinkansen – inter-city rail (JR Central)
- Biwako Line and JR Kyoto Line – regional and commuter rail (JR West)
- Kosei Line – regional and commuter rail (JR West)
- San'in Main Line – regional and commuter rail (JR West)
- Nara Line – commuter rail (JR West)
- Kusatsu Line – commuter rail (JR West)
- Kyoto Line (Kintetsu) – regional and commuter rail (Kintetsu)
- Keihan Main Line and Uji Line – commuter rail (Keihan)
- Keishin Line – commuter rail, subway, and tram (Keihan)
- Ishiyama Sakamoto Line – commuter rail and tram (Keihan)
- Hankyu Kyoto Main Line and Hankyu Arashiyama Line – commuter rail (Hankyu)
- Arashiyama Line and Kitano Line – commuter rail and tram (Randen)
- Karasuma Line and Tōzai Line – Kyoto City Subway
- Eizan Main Line and Kurama Line – commuter rail (Eiden)

=== Road ===
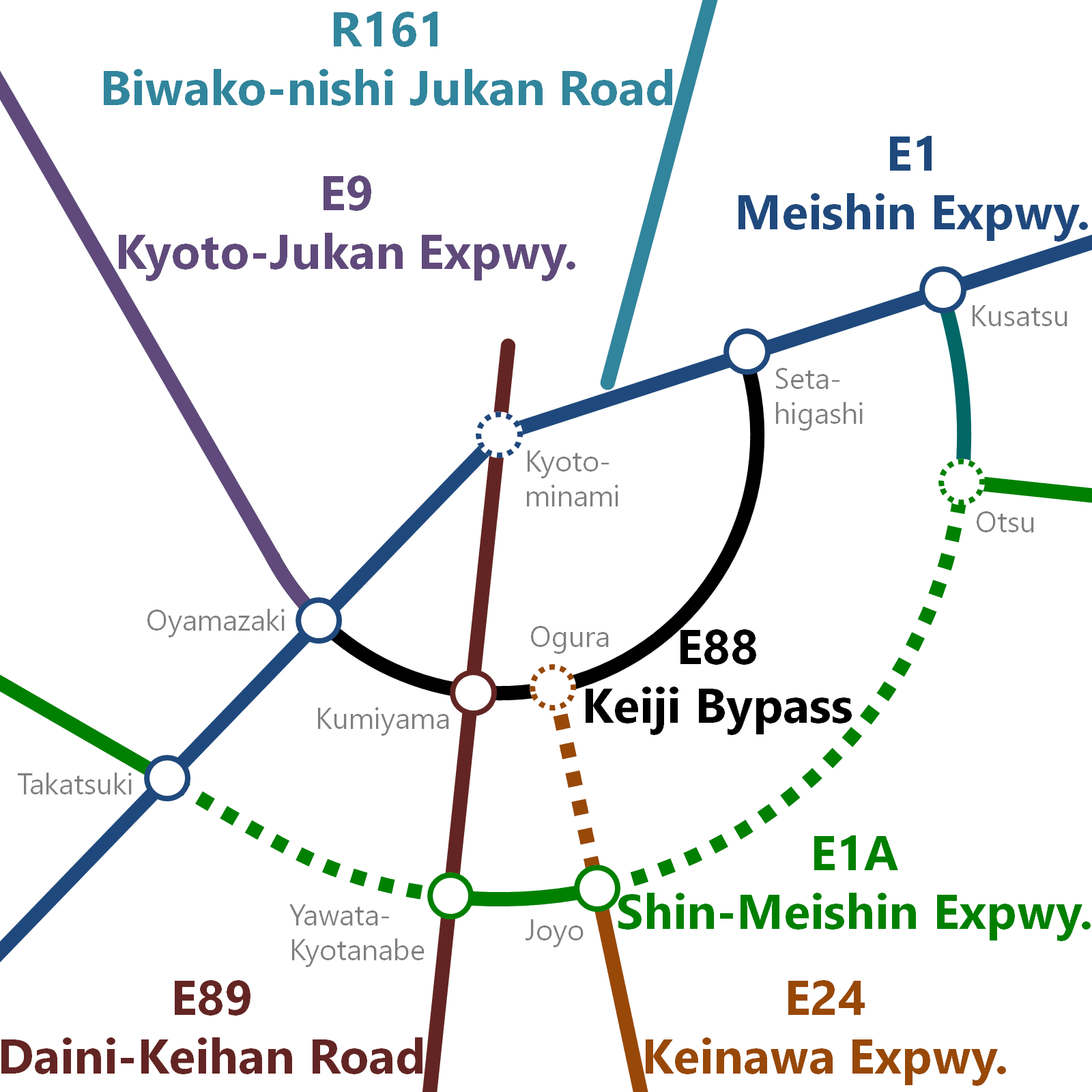
Expressway map around Kyoto City. Roads and junctions under planning are shown by dotted lines.

- Meishin Expressway
- Shin-Meishin Expressway
- Kyoto-Jukan Expressway
- Keinawa Expressway
- Keiji Bypass
- Daini-Keihan Road
- Japan National Route 1
- Japan National Route 8
- Japan National Route 9
- Japan National Route 24
- Japan National Route 161
- Japan National Route 171

== See also ==
- List of metropolitan areas in Japan by population
