= Fukuoka–Kitakyushu =

Coordinates: 33.5833°N 130.4000°E

Fukuoka–Kitakyushu Fukuoka-Kitakyushu Greater Metropolitan Region
- Metropolitan area
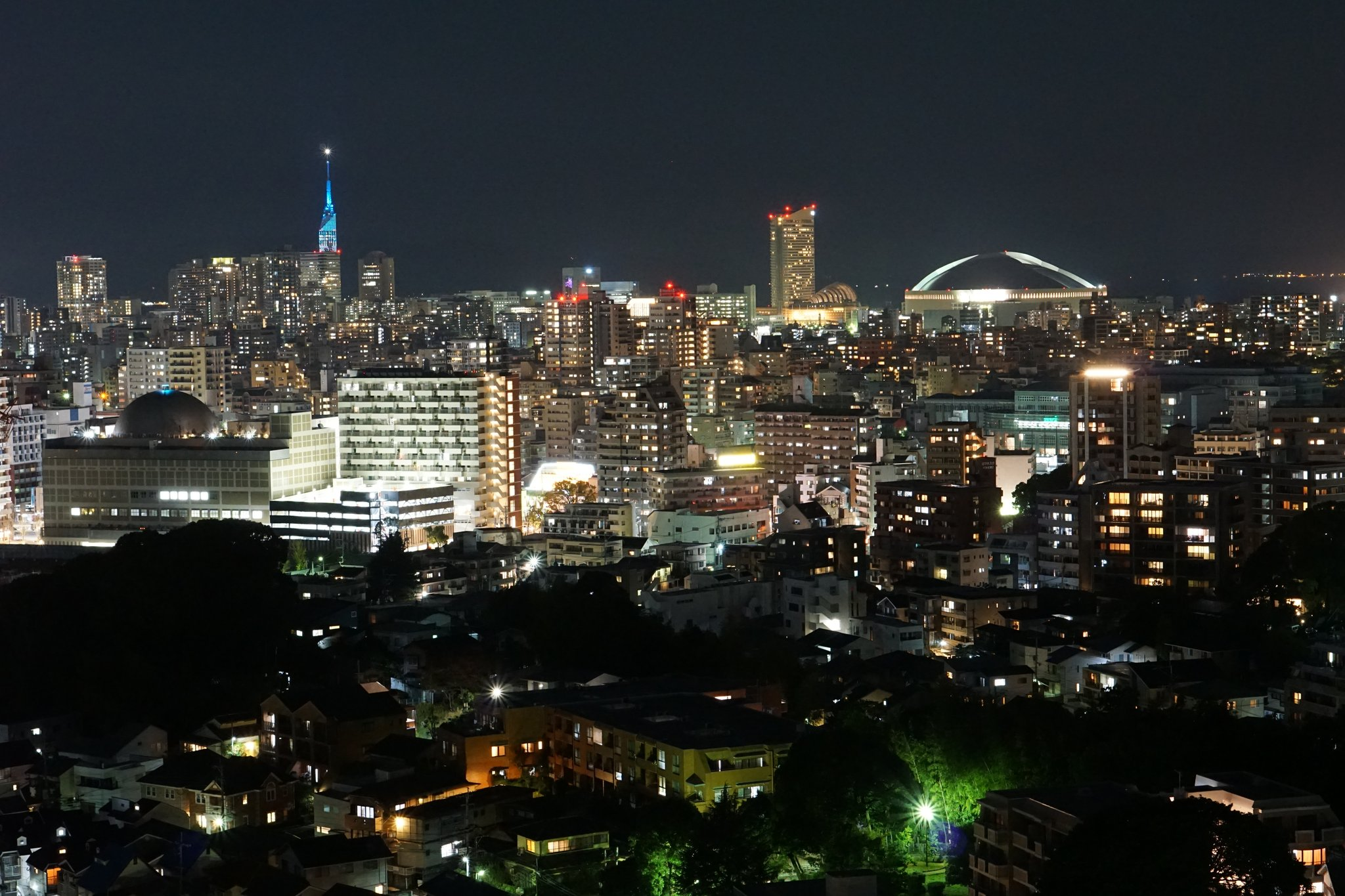
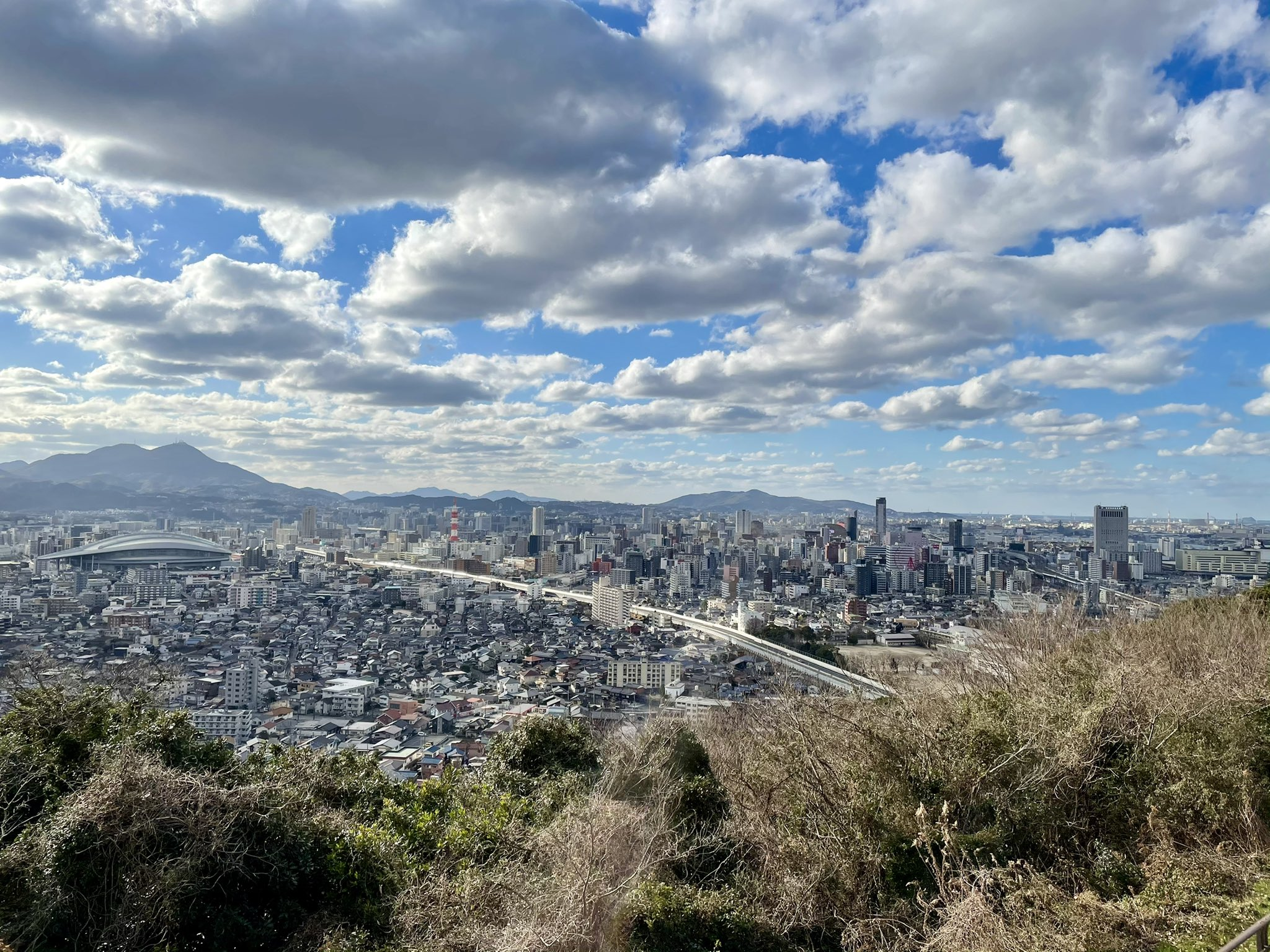
- Fukuoka Kitakyushu

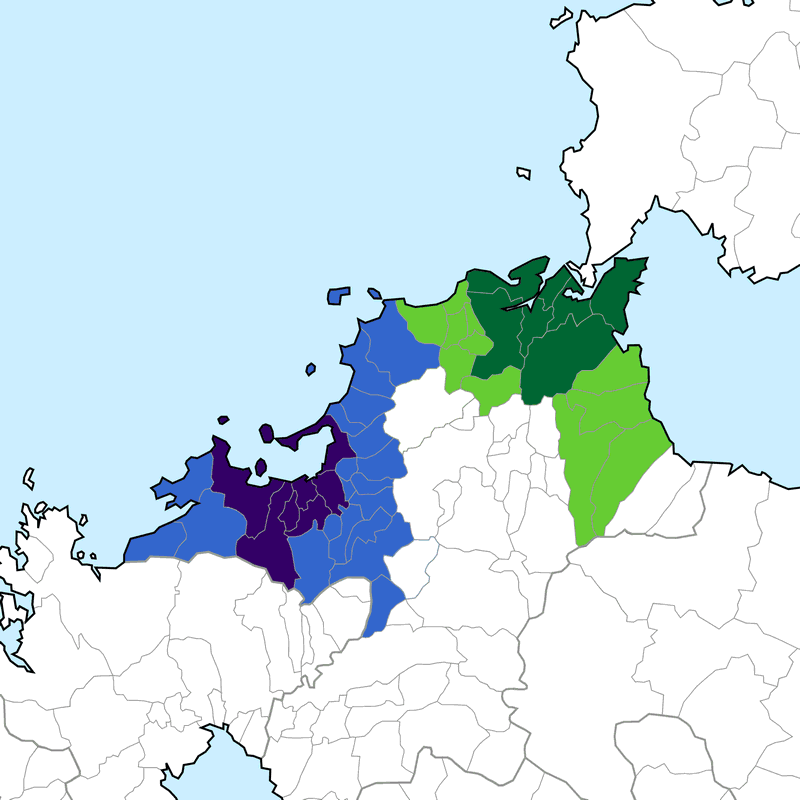
- A map showing Fukuoka and Kitakyushu Metropolitan Employment Areas in 2015.
- Country: Japan
- Prefectures: Fukuoka

Area
  - Metro: 5,741 km^{2} (2,217 sq mi)

Population (2015)
  - Metro: 5,538,142
  - Metro density: 964.7/km^{2} (2,498/sq mi)

GDP
  - Metro: JP¥20,187 billion (2022); US$155 billion (2022)

Fukuoka-Kitakyushu Greater Metropolitan Region (福岡・北九州大都市圏, Fukuoka Kitakyūshū Daitoshiken) is the most common name given to the region comprising the metropolitan areas of the cities of Fukuoka and Kitakyushu in Fukuoka Prefecture, Japan and in between. Alternate names are many, including Kitakyushu-Fukuoka Greater Metropolitan Region (北九州・福岡大都市圏), Northern Part of Kyushu Greater Metropolitan Region (北部九州大都市圏)

One reason for complications in naming is because the whole region itself was once referred to as "Kitakyushu", which had become ambiguous after the city merger in 1963 which created the city by the same name.

These cities may be referred to separately, but often are lumped together since they are close and lie in the same prefecture. Furthermore, their economic spheres, infrastructure, and transport links overlap. Note that the metro areas include the tip of Honshu island (Shimonoseki on Honshu is a significant suburb of Kitakyushu), as well as the northern part of Kyushu. The definition of Northern Kyushu is not a superset of Fukuoka–Kitakyushu; among the ways it differs: it generally does not include any cities on Honshu island.

== Definition ==
The region consists of the following areas:

Administrative division	Population
Fukuoka-Kurume-Saga within Greater Fukuoka (福岡都市圏)	2,868,977 (Oct 2006)
Greater Kitakyushu (北九州都市圏)/Kanmon Metropolitan Area (関門都市圏) including Shimonoseki (下関都市圏)	2,400,000 (2005 Census)
Iizuka region (飯塚都市圏)	200,000 (2005 Census)
Ube region (宇部都市圏)	270,000 (Nov 2006)
Fukuoka–Kitakyushu	5,738,977

- The Ube region may or may not be considered part of this region, depending on definition
- Note: The cities of Ōita, Sasebo, Kumamoto are never included as being part of Fukuoka–Kitakyushu, despite their relative proximity to Fukuoka and Kitakyushu, rather, they are part of Northern Kyūshū.

== Trends ==
Fukuoka metropolitan area Fukuoka MEA
- Urban Employment Area
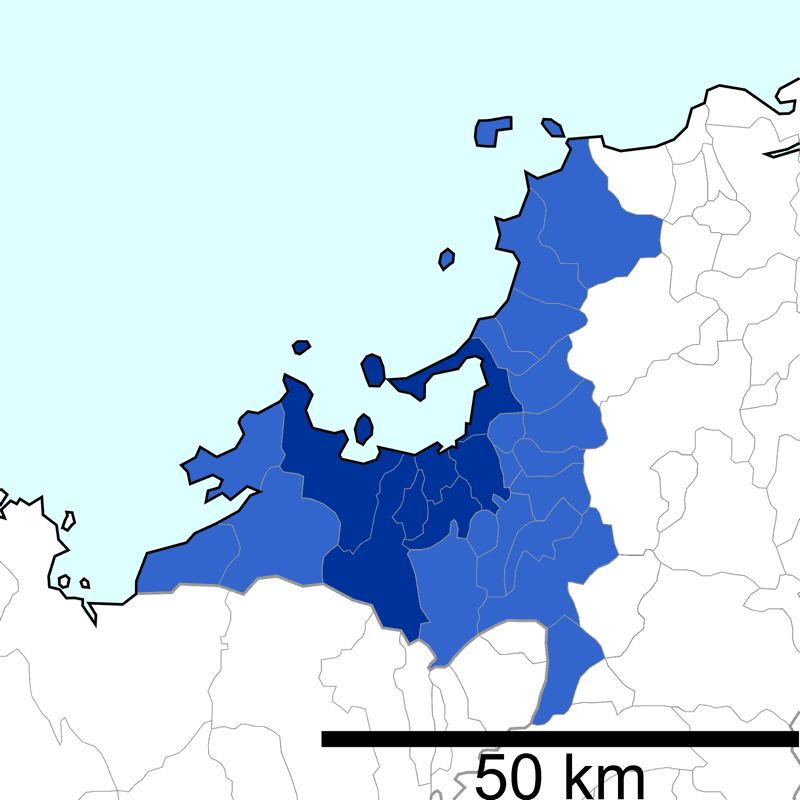
- Fukuoka MEA as of 2015
- Interactive map of Fukuoka metropolitan area
- Country: Japan
- Prefectures: Fukuoka Prefecture
- Core city: Fukuoka

Area (2011)
  - Total: 1,282.99 km^{2} (495.37 sq mi)
  - Inhabitable area: 771.07 km^{2} (297.71 sq mi)

Population (2015)
  - Total: 2,565,501
  - Rank: 5th in Japan
  - Density: 1,999.63/km^{2} (5,179.01/sq mi)
- GDP (nominal): 8.92 trillion Japanese yen (2010)
- Website: www.fukuoka-tosiken.jp

There is a trend for concentration near Fukuoka, with the other areas declining in importance.

Population
Metropolitan area	1980	1990	2000	2010	2015
Fukuoka MEA	1,773,129	2,129,424	2,329,021	2,495,552	2,565,501
Kitakyushu MEA	1,524,747	1,428,014	1,425,920	1,397,618	1,314,276
Kurume MEA	384,264	461,686	419,616	432,441	431,897
Shimonoseki MEA	348,875	338,049	287,935	280,947	268,517
Iizuka McEA	188,420	217,059	209,400	196,546	189,195

Kitakyushu MEA as of 2010

Kurume MEA as of 2010

Shimonoseki MEA as of 2010

Iizuka McEA as of 2010
