= Kajiki Manjū =

Traditional steamed Japanese confection

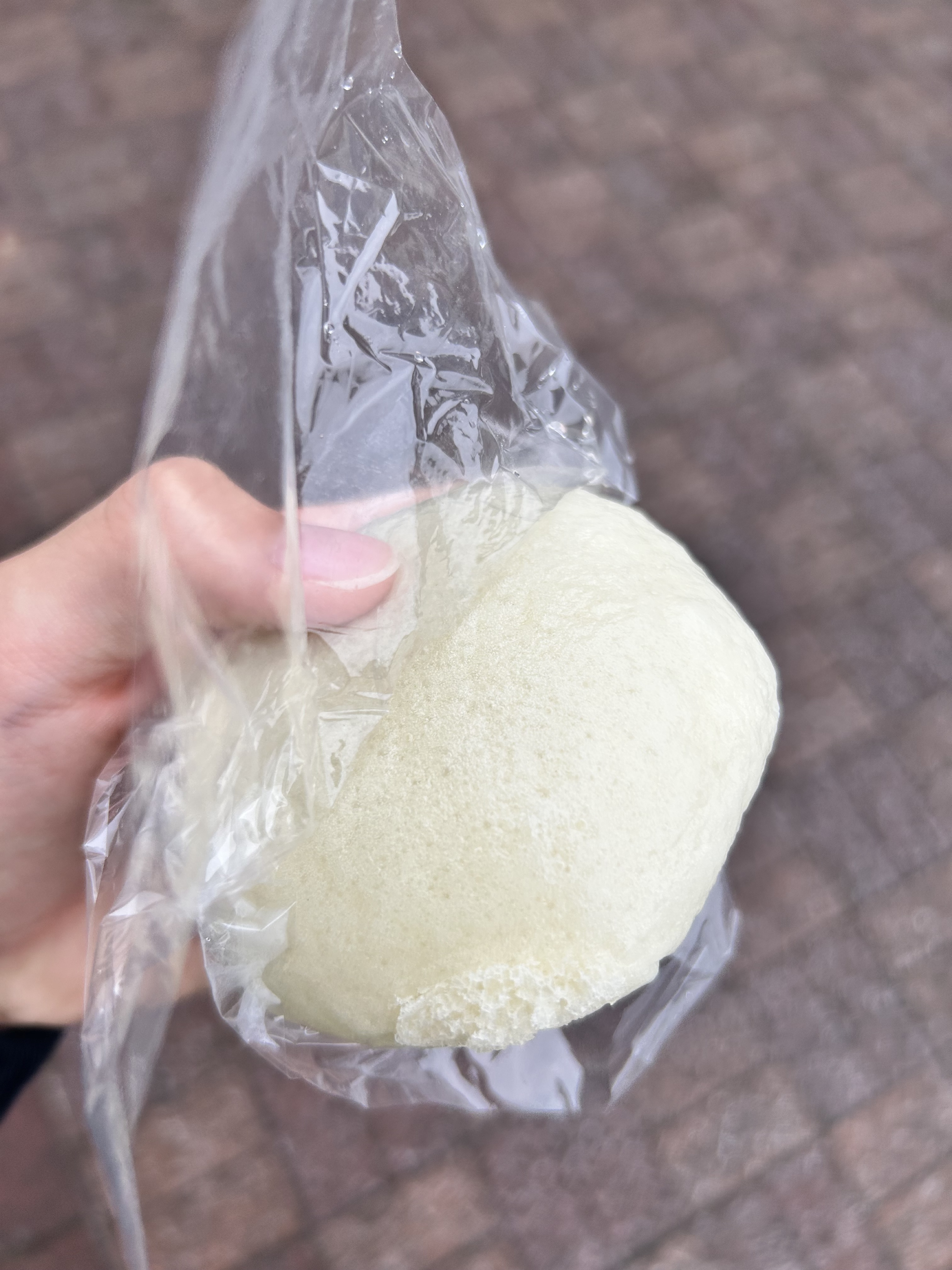
Kajiki Manjū

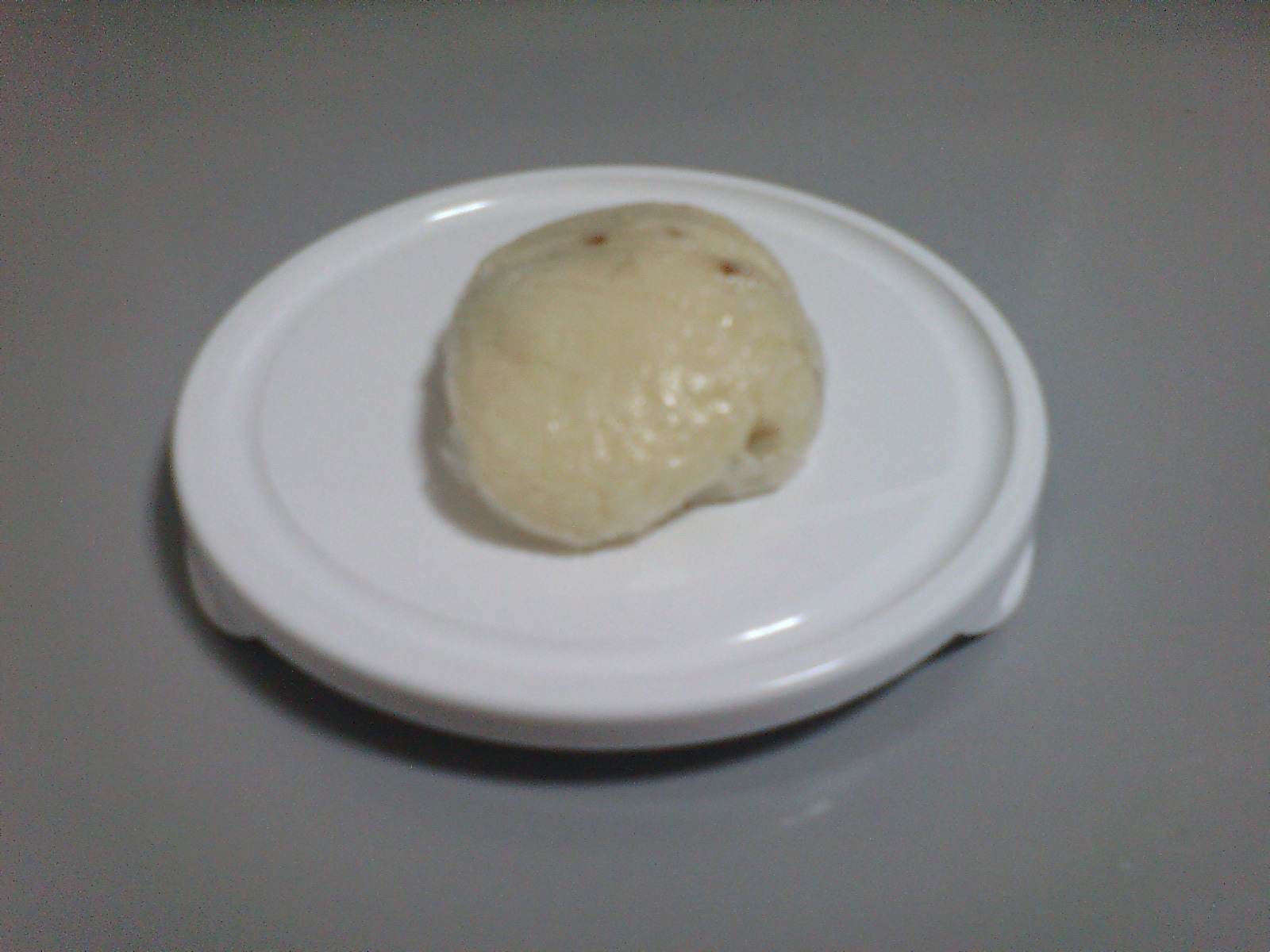
Kajiki Manjū

Kajiki Manjū is a traditional type of steamed Japanese confection (manjū) primarily consumed in the Kyushu region of Japan, especially in Kagoshima and Miyazaki Prefectures. It is a regional specialty of Kajiki Town in Aira City, Kagoshima Prefecture, and has been produced since the mid-Edo period.

== Overview ==
Kajiki Manjū originated in Kajiki Town, located in Aira City in Kagoshima Prefecture on the island of Kyushu. It remains a locally consumed confectionery item to this day. It is a typical steamed manjū, most commonly filled with smooth red bean paste (koshian). The basic ingredients include wheat flour, malted rice (kōji, typically in the form of sweet sake or amazake), sugar, adzuki beans and salt.

Traditionally classified as a type of sake manjū (steamed buns made using fermented dough), Kajiki Manjū was historically made with white dough only. However, since the Heisei era (1989–2019), new variations have emerged, featuring dough colored and flavored with ingredients such as brown sugar, mugwort (yomogi), carrots and purple sweet potatoes. These colorful adaptations have gained popularity in recent years.

Kajiki Manjū is known for being very affordable, with many shops selling it for under 100 yen. It is typically not available at major transportation hubs such as airports or train stations, nor in department stores. This is likely because Kajiki Manjū is traditionally served hot and freshly steamed—an aspect that cannot be replicated in mass retail environments.

Along National Route 10 in Kajiki Town, numerous confectionery shops—seven of which belong to the Kajiki Manjū Producers’ Cooperative—operate as direct-sale establishments, offering freshly made, piping hot manjū. Kajiki Manjū is also frequently found in the confectionery sections of supermarkets in Kajiki Town and neighboring Aira Town, and is a beloved local treat. It is also available at rest area shops, such as those at the Sakurajima Service Area.

While Kajiki Manjū enjoys high recognition in southern Kyushu—especially in Kagoshima Prefecture and the western part of Miyazaki Prefecture (notably in cities like Miyakonojo and Kobayashi)—it remains relatively unknown in other parts of Japan.

== History ==
One theory suggests that the recipe for manjū was introduced to Satsuma (modern-day Kagoshima Prefecture) in 1478 (Bunmei 10) by the Zen monk Kian Genju, who learned the art of confectionery during his studies in Ming China.

Later, in 1606 (Keichō 11), prior to relocating to Kajiki in 1607, the daimyō Shimazu Yoshihiro began construction of the Kajiki Castle residence. During the construction, manjū was reportedly served as a tea snack to laborers resting on the Rangankyo bridge—this event is widely regarded as the origin of modern Kajiki Manjū.

== Related items ==
- Manjū
- Sake manjū
