= Fukure-Gashi =

Japanese confection

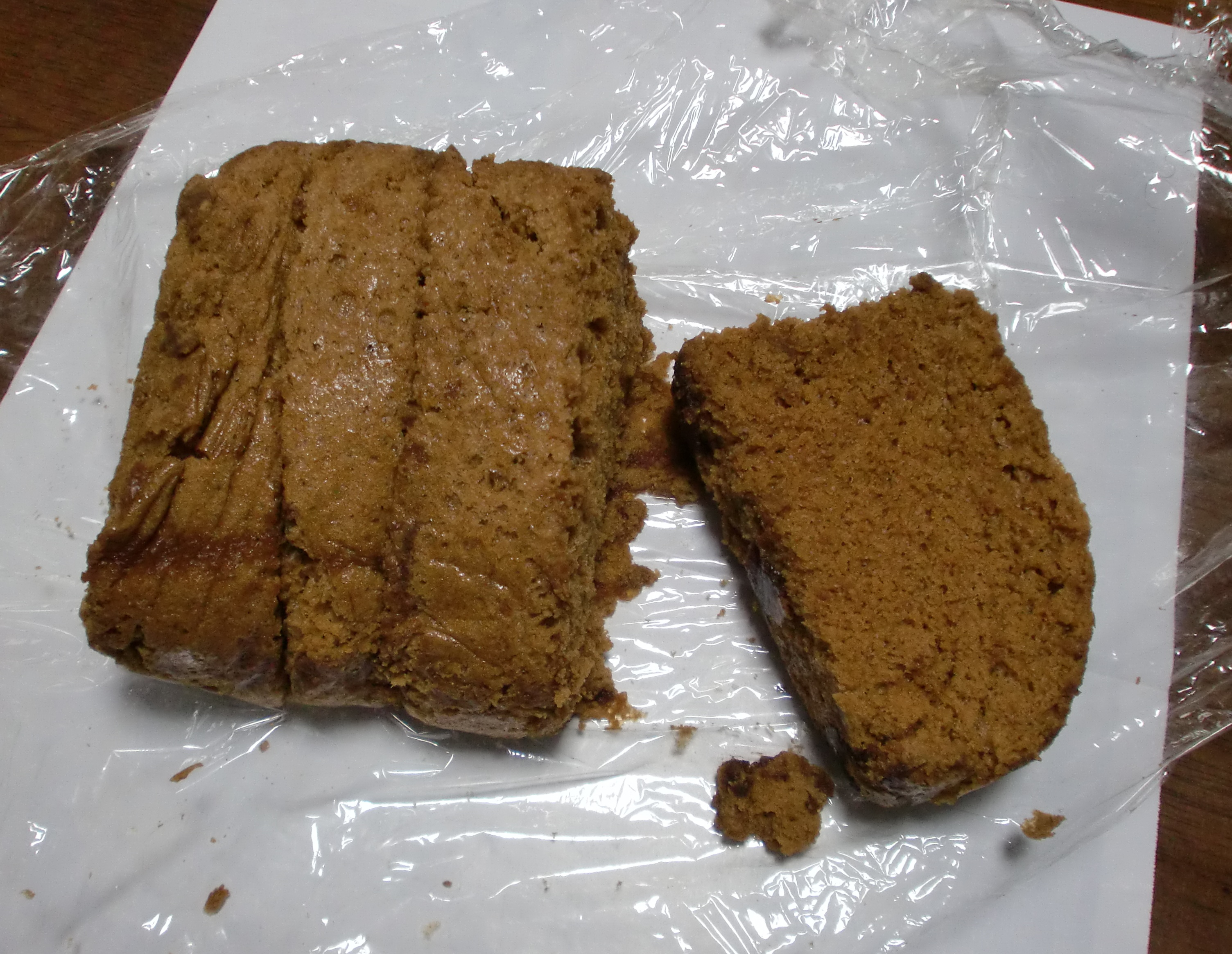
Fukure-Gashi

Fukure-Gashi (ふくれがし / ふくれかし) is a traditional confection from the Kyushu of Japan. It is a steamed, brown-colored cake with a rich brown sugar flavor, resembling a sweet bread or sponge cake.

In Okinawa Prefecture, there are similar steamed confections with comparable flavor, often made in a hemispherical shape. These are commonly known as Agarasaa (あがらさー) or Kokutō Kasutera (黒糖かすてら).

== Overview ==
Fukure-Gashi is a traditional Japanese confection with origins in the Edo period, commonly eaten in regions such as Kagoshima, Miyazaki, and Okinawa. Today, it is enjoyed not only in southern Kyushu but also in northern areas such as Fukuoka and Saga, and remains a familiar treat in many Kyushu households.

Most versions are flavored with brown sugar, which accounts for the majority of types. In recent years, however, flavor variations such as matcha and strawberry have also become popular.

Because baking soda is used as a leavening agent, the cake expands to more than twice its original size when steamed. For this reason, it is sometimes referred to as Soda-gashi (ソーダ菓子).

In the Amami Islands, regional names for this sweet include Fukure-kan (ふくれかん) in Amami Ōshima, Fukuri-kan (ふくりかん) in Kikaijima, and Soda-mochi (ソーダ餅) in Tokunoshima. All of these are recognized as referring to Fukure-Gashi.

== History ==
In Kagoshima, Fukure-Gashi is believed to have gradually developed during the Edo period through interactions between the Satsuma Domain and the Ryukyu Kingdom(Okinawa), which was a major producer of brown sugar at the time. This cultural exchange gave rise to a variety of local dishes in southern Kyushu that incorporated brown sugar as a key ingredient.

From the Meiji period onward, Fukure-Gashi was commonly seen in households throughout Kyushu as a snack for children. During wartime, it was also valued as a sweet treat by people in both Kyushu and Okinawa.

== Preparation ==
The basic ingredients for Fukure-Gashi are brown sugar powder, cake flour, water, and baking soda, typically in a weight ratio of approximately 2:2:1:0.05. Using equal parts flour and sugar yields the most desirable texture.

Because using only brown sugar powder results in a very dark color, some recipes substitute about half of it with white sugar, depending on personal preference. Variations may also include replacing part of the water with milk or eggs, or adding ingredients such as honey, mugwort, pumpkin, red beans, or Suizenjina (スイゼンジナ, also known as Handama or はんだま). In Amami Ōshima, a bright orange version is made using white sugar and tankan juice.

The baking soda is mixed into the flour and sifted. The sugar is dissolved in heated water to create a syrup.

The flour and sugar syrup are combined into a batter, then poured into a mold or cake pan lined with cloth. The mixture is steamed in a steamer for 40–50 minutes until it rises and becomes firm.

In some cases, a small amount of vinegar is added before steaming to promote aeration, though this tends to produce larger air holes. Adding vinegar slightly reduces the viscosity of the batter, making it more fluid. When eggs are included, the resulting texture is somewhat firmer.

== See also ==
- Brown sugar cake
