= Kore mochi =

Japanese confection

Kore mochi (Koregashi, 高麗餅,これもち) is a traditional Japanese confection made from sweetened rice flour and red bean paste, commonly prepared and consumed in the Kyushu region, particularly in Kagoshima Prefecture.

== Overview ==
Kore mochi is a steamed mochi dessert eaten primarily in Kyushu, including the prefectures of Kagoshima, Miyazaki, and Fukuoka. It is often referred to as koregashi or kore mochi, and is commonly used as a gift during Buddhist memorial services. However, it is also widely enjoyed at home as a sweet snack.

The confection is made by kneading glutinous rice flour or non-glutinous rice flour with sugar and azuki beans, then steaming the mixture. Brown sugar is frequently used, giving the final product a rich, brown color. Unlike sweets that contain a filling of red bean paste, kore mochi typically incorporates whole azuki beans directly into the dough, resulting in a unified texture and appearance.

The surface is glossy, and the cross-section reveals evenly distributed azuki beans. It has a chewy, elastic texture, with a harmonious flavor profile that balances the mild sweetness of the beans with the deep richness of brown sugar. The size and shape vary by region and household, but the mochi is most commonly shaped into sticks or rectangular blocks.

A similar confection can be found in Korea, known as siru-tteok (팥시루떡).

== History ==
The term "Kore" in Kore mochi originates from Kōrai (高麗), the name of an ancient Korean kingdom. However, it remains unclear whether the sweet has direct roots in the Korean Peninsula. In Kagoshima, it has been common to apply the prefix "Kōrai" to foreign-influenced foods and customs, and this confection may be an example of that naming tradition.

One theory suggests that Korean potters brought to Kyushu during the Japanese invasions of Korea (1592–1598) introduced the sweet while working in Satsuma kilns, though this is largely considered anecdotal.

The exact period during which kore mochi became widespread is unknown. However, it has been enjoyed as a daily sweet within the Satsuma domain since at least the Edo period. In rural areas, its long shelf life and ease of preparation made it a popular offering for Buddhist and Shinto rituals, seasonal events, and funerals—a custom that continues today. Traditionally, kore mochi was made at home, and as such, variations in ingredients and preparation methods can be seen between regions and households.

In modern times, kore mochi is consumed not only in southern Kyushu but also in the northern parts of the region.

== Preparation ==
To make kore mochi, equal parts of glutinous rice and non-glutinous rice (five gō each) are ground into flour.

This flour is then combined with strained red bean paste (koshian) made from five gō of azuki beans and approximately two kin of sugar. The ingredients are thoroughly mixed to form the base.

The mixture is steamed in a rectangular wooden seiro (steaming tray). No water is added to the batter.

The ideal consistency is when the mixture crumbles easily when squeezed in the hand and then quickly released.

Steaming takes about one hour. As the mixture remains delicate and prone to crumbling, it should be firmly pressed into shape before being removed from the steamer.
