= Kyushu =

Island and region of Japan

Native name: 九州
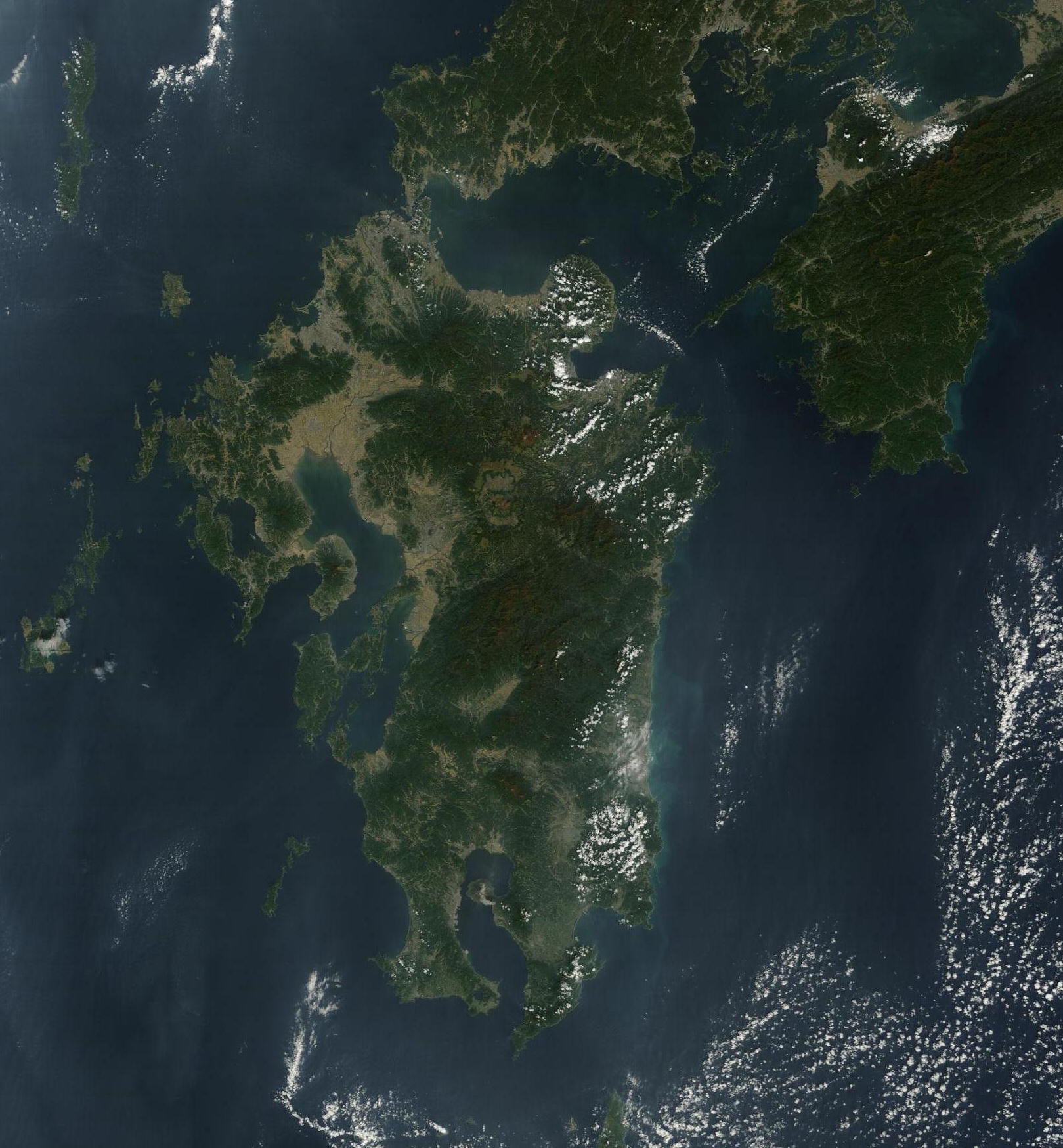
- October 2009 NASA satellite image of Kyushu

- Kyushu region of Japan and the current prefectures on the island of Kyushu

Geography
- Location: East Asia
- Coordinates: 33°N 131°E
- Archipelago: Japanese archipelago
- Area: 36,782.37 km^{2} (14,201.75 sq mi)
- Area rank: 37th
- Coastline: 12,221 km (7593.8 mi)
- Highest elevation: 1,791 m (5876 ft)
- Highest point: Mount Kujū

Administration
- Japan
- Prefectures: Fukuoka; Kagoshima; Kumamoto; Miyazaki; Nagasaki; Oita; Saga
- Largest settlement: Fukuoka

Demographics
- Population: 12,382,121 (as of October 2025)
- Population rank: 15th
- Pop. density: 337/km^{2} (873/sq mi)
- Languages: Japanese (Western Japanese — Hichiku, Hōnichi, Ōita and Kagoshima dialects); Japanese Sign; Ryukyuan languages
- Ethnic groups: Japanese; Ryukyuans

Additional information
- Time zone: Japan Standard Time (UTC+9)

Kyushu (Japanese: 九州, Hepburn: Kyūshū; pronounced [k̟ʲj̊ɨ́ɨ̀.ɕɨ̀ɨ̀], lit. 'nine provinces') is the third-largest and most southerly of Japan's four main islands. In the past, it has been known as Kyūkoku (九国, "Nine Countries"), Chinzei (鎮西, "West of the Pacified Area") and Tsukushi-no-shima (筑紫島, "Island of Tsukushi"). The historical regional name Saikaidō (西海道; lit. West Sea Circuit) referred to Kyushu and its surrounding islands. Kyushu has a land area of 36,782 square kilometres (14,202 sq mi) and a population of 12,382,121 as of 2025, a population size similar to New Guinea or Cuba.

There is a theory that Kyushu was in ancient times home to its own independent dynasty, where a unique, southern-influenced culture and tradition distinct from that of Honshu flourished.

In the 8th-century Taihō Code reforms, Dazaifu was established as a special administrative term for the region.

== Geography ==
Kyushu, as seen from the International Space Station

Geofeatures map of Kyushu

The island is mountainous, and Japan's largest active volcano, Mount Aso at 1,591 metres (5,220 ft), is on Kyushu. There are many other signs of tectonic activity, including numerous areas of hot springs. The most famous of these are in Beppu, on the east shore, and around Mt. Aso in central Kyushu. The island is separated from Honshu by the Kanmon Straits. Being the nearest island to the Asian continent, historically it is the gateway to Japan.

The total area is 36,782.37 km^{2} (14,201.75 sq mi) which makes it the 37th largest island in the world. It is slightly larger than Taiwan or Vancouver Island. The highest elevation is 1791 meters (5876 feet) on Mount Kujū.

The name Kyūshū comes from the nine ancient provinces of Saikaidō situated on the island: Chikuzen, Chikugo, Hizen, Higo, Buzen, Bungo, Hyūga, Ōsumi, and Satsuma.

Today's Kyushu Region (九州地方, Kyūshū-chihō) is a politically defined region that consists of the seven prefectures on the island of Kyushu (which also includes the former Tsushima and Iki as part of Nagasaki), plus Okinawa Prefecture to the south:

- Northern Kyushu
  - Fukuoka Prefecture
  - Kumamoto Prefecture
  - Nagasaki Prefecture
  - Ōita Prefecture
  - Saga Prefecture
- Southern Kyushu
  - Kagoshima Prefecture
  - Miyazaki Prefecture
- Okinawa
  - Okinawa Prefecture

== Population ==
Kyushu has 10.1 percent of the population of Japan. Most of Kyushu's population is concentrated along the northwest, in the cities of Fukuoka and Kitakyushu, with population corridors stretching southwest into Sasebo and Nagasaki and south into Kumamoto and Kagoshima. Except for Oita and Miyazaki, the eastern seaboard is sparsely populated.

Politically, Kyushu is described as a stronghold of the Liberal Democratic Party.

Per Japanese census data, the Kyushu region's population with Ryukyu Islands (Okinawa and Kagoshima Prefectures) has experienced a large decline since around 2000. However, the population decline in total is mild because of the relatively high birth rate of Ryukyuans both within the Ryukyuan lands (Okinawa and Kagoshima) and throughout the Kyushu region. In addition, the other prefectures in Kyushu also have exceptionally high TFRs compared to the rest of Japan.

Historical populations
Including Ryukyu Islands

Historical population
| Year | Pop. | ±% |
|---|---|---|
| 1873 | 5,163,730 | — |
| 1920 | 8,730,000 | +69.1% |
| 1930 | 9,647,000 | +10.5% |
| 1940 | 10,511,000 | +9.0% |
| 1950 | 13,011,000 | +23.8% |
| 1960 | 13,787,000 | +6.0% |
| 1970 | 13,016,000 | −5.6% |
| 1980 | 14,073,000 | +8.1% |
| 1990 | 14,518,000 | +3.2% |
| 2000 | 14,763,781 | +1.7% |
| 2010 | 14,596,783 | −1.1% |
| 2020 | 14,246,438 | −2.4% |
Includes Okinawa and Kagoshima prefecture populations.

Excluding Ryukyu Islands

Historical population
| Year | Pop. | ±% |
|---|---|---|
| 1873 | 4,776,363 | — |
| 1920 | 6,742,000 | +41.2% |
| 1930 | 7,512,000 | +11.4% |
| 1940 | 8,347,000 | +11.1% |
| 1950 | 10,292,000 | +23.3% |
| 1960 | 10,941,000 | +6.3% |
| 1970 | 10,342,000 | −5.5% |
| 1980 | 11,181,000 | +8.1% |
| 1990 | 11,498,000 | +2.8% |
| 2000 | 11,659,367 | +1.4% |
| 2010 | 11,497,723 | −1.4% |
| 2020 | 11,190,702 | −2.7% |
In 1873, Ōsumi Province represents the Ryukyu portion of Kagoshima. In all subsequent timepoints, this table excludes the entirety of Kagoshima Prefecture.

=== Designated cities ===
- Fukuoka (population: 1,588,924)
- Kitakyushu (population: 940,978)
- Kumamoto (population: 738,907)

=== Core cities ===
- Kagoshima
- Kurume
- Miyazaki
- Naha
- Nagasaki
- Ōita
- Saga
- Sasebo

== Environment and agriculture ==
Parts of Kyushu have a subtropical climate, particularly Miyazaki Prefecture and Kagoshima Prefecture. Major agricultural products are rice, tea, tobacco, sweet potatoes, and soy. Silk is also widely produced.

Besides the volcanic area of the south, there are significant mud hot springs in the northern part of the island, around Beppu. The springs are the site of occurrence of certain extremophile microorganisms, which are capable of surviving in extremely hot environments.

There are two World Natural Heritage sites in Kyushu: Yakushima (registered in 1993) and Amami-Ōshima Island, Tokunoshima Island, northern part of Okinawa Island, and Iriomote Island (registered in 2021).

== Economy ==
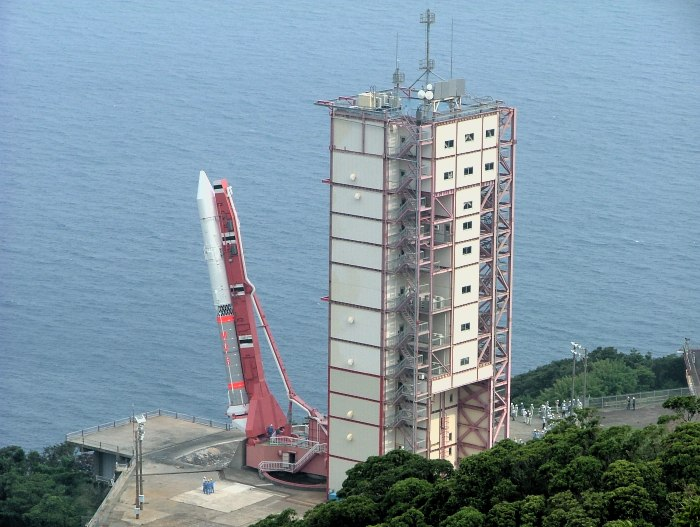
M-V rocket launch rehearsal at USC

Kyushu's economy accounts for approximately 10% of Japan's total economic output, making it comparable to countries such as Iran, Norway, Austria, the United Arab Emirates, and Thailand. It is the fourth largest economic region in Japan, following the three major metropolitan areas of Tokyo, Osaka, and Nagoya.

Kyushu's economy has a well-balanced industrial structure, ranging from primary industries such as agriculture, to secondary industries such as manufacturing, and tertiary industries such as retail, services, and tourism. Agricultural output in the region amounts to 1.8 trillion yen (20% share of the national total), and the region is a major domestic production center for the automobile and semiconductor industries. Kyushu also has a thriving healthcare industry, including medical and nursing care, and numerous research and manufacturing facilities in the fields of hydrogen, solar power, and other renewable energies. Furthermore, Fukuoka City, Kitakyushu City and Okinawa Prefecture have been designated as National Strategic Special Zones, which are expected to have an economic ripple effect on the entire Kyushu region through the creation of innovation in industry and the promotion of new entrepreneurship and start-ups.

Kyushu is a region with strong economic ties to Asia. For example, Asia accounted for 420 (77.9%) of the 539 overseas expansion cases of Kyushu-Yamaguchi companies from 2010 to 2019, and Asia accounted for 61.1% of Kyushu-Yamaguchi's total exports in 2019, 7.4 percentage points higher than the nation as a whole. As the logistics node between Japan and Asia, the ports of Hakata and Kitakyushu handle a large number of international containers. In addition, the number of cruise ship calls in 2019 was 772, with Kyushu accounting for 26.9% of the nation's total.

Kyushu is noted for various types of porcelain, including Arita, Imari, Satsuma, and Karatsu. Heavy industry is concentrated in the north around Fukuoka, Kitakyushu, Nagasaki, and Oita and includes chemicals, automobiles, semiconductors, metal processing, shipbuilding, etc. The island of Tanegashima hosts the Tanegashima Space Center, which is the largest rocket-launch complex in Japan.

== Transportation ==
Kyushu is linked to the larger island of Honshu by the Kanmon Railway Tunnel, which carries the non-Shinkansen trains of the Kyushu Railway Company, and the newer Shin-Kanmon Tunnel carrying the San'yō Shinkansen. Railways on the island are operated by the Kyushu Railway Company and West Japan Railway Company, as well as a variety of smaller companies such as Amagi Railway and Nishitetsu Railway. Kyushu Shinkansen trains operate between major cities on the island, such as Fukuoka and Kagoshima, with an additional route between Takeo-Onsen and Nagasaki which has been in operation since September 2022. Kyushu is also known for its scenic train services, such as the Limited Express Yufuin no Mori and Limited Express Kawasemi Yamasemi.

The Kanmon Bridge and Kanmon Roadway Tunnel also connect the island with Honshu, allowing for vehicular transport between the two. The Kyushu Expressway spans the length of the island, linking the Higashikyushu Expressway and Ibusuki Skyline, connecting major cities such as Fukuoka and Kumamoto along the way. There are also many quiet country roads, including popular tourist routes such as the Nichinan coast road and the Aso Panorama Line in Kumamoto Prefecture. Bus services are available and cover 2,400 routes within Kyushu's cities, connecting many other destinations.

Several passenger and car ferry services connect both northern and southern Kyushu with main port cities on the main island of Honshu (Kobe, Osaka, Tokyo) and Shikoku.

The island's main larger airport is served by Fukuoka Airport which provides most domestic and internationals flights. There are also smaller airports across island including Kumamoto Airport, Miyazaki Airport, Oita Airport, Saga Airport, Nagasaki Airport Kitakyushu Airport and Kagoshima Airport.

== Education ==
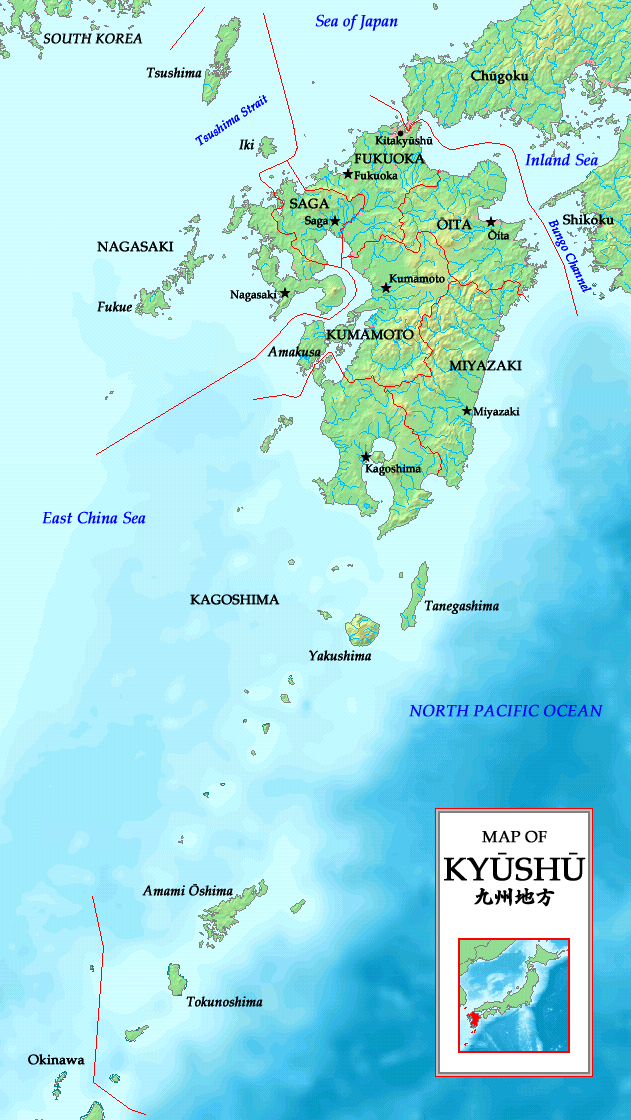
Map of Kyushu region with prefectures

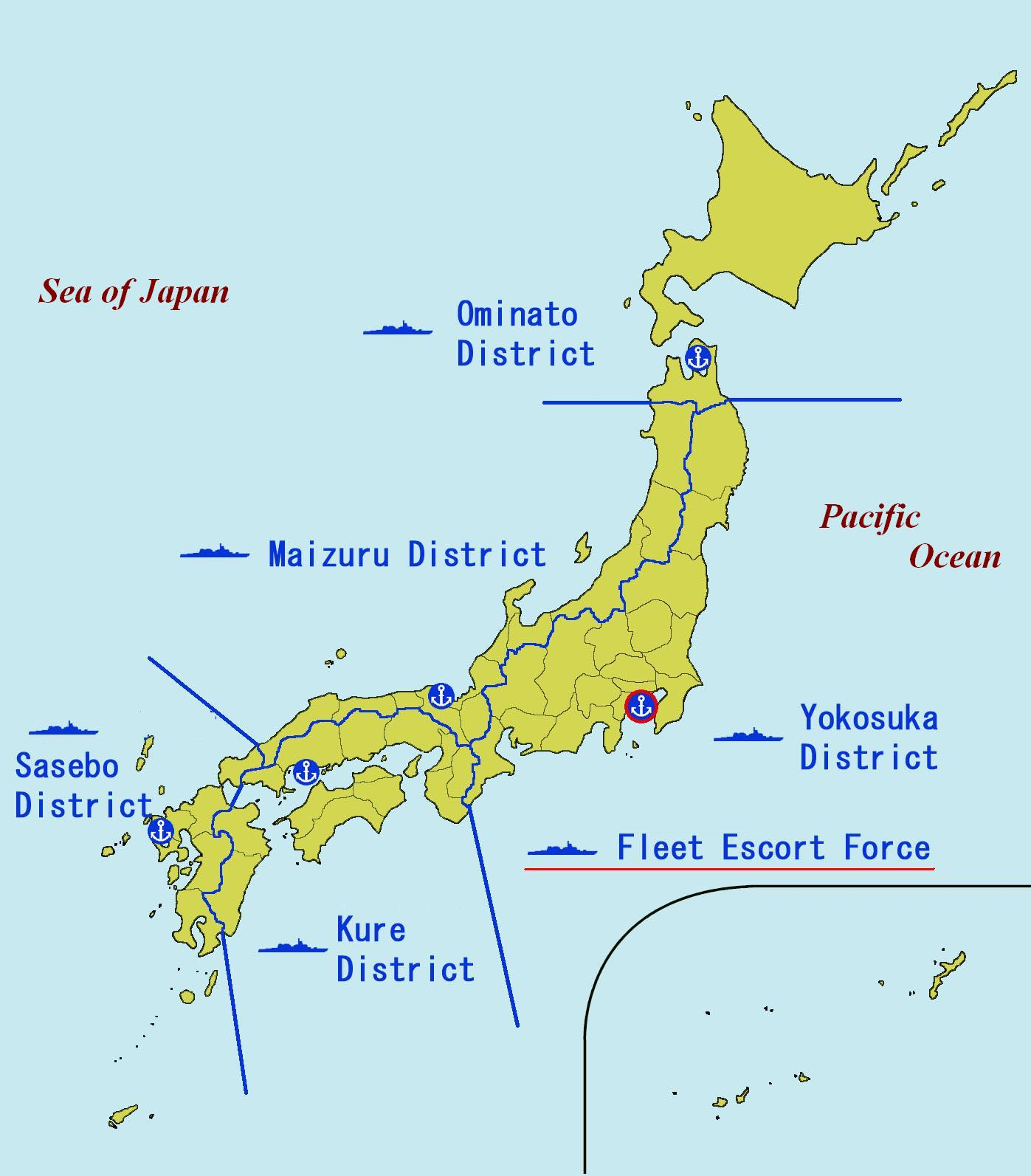
JMSDF District Forces, including the Sasebo District Force

Major universities and colleges in Kyushu:

- National universities
  - Fukuoka University of Education
  - Kagoshima University
  - Kumamoto University
  - Kyushu Institute of Technology
  - Kyushu University – One of seven former "Imperial Universities"
  - Miyazaki University
  - Nagasaki University
  - National Institute of Fitness and Sports in Kanoya
  - Oita University
  - Saga University
  - University of the Ryukyus
- Universities run by local governments
  - Fukuoka Prefectural University
  - Fukuoka Women's University
  - Kyushu Dental College
  - Miyazaki Municipal University
  - Miyazaki Prefectural Nursing University
  - Nagasaki Prefectural University
  - Oita University of Nursing and Health Sciences
  - Okinawa Prefectural University of Arts
  - Prefectural University of Kumamoto
  - University of Kitakyushu
- Major private universities
  - Fukuoka University – University with the largest number of students in Kyushu
  - Kumamoto Gakuen University
  - Kurume University
  - Kyushu Sangyo University – Baseball team won the Japanese National Championship in 2005
  - Ritsumeikan Asia Pacific University
  - Seinan Gakuin University
  - University of Occupational and Environmental Health

== Culture ==
Kyushu has maintained the strongest economic and cultural ties with Okinawa (Ryukyu) from ancient times to the present. Traces of Okinawan culture can be seen throughout Kyushu, and vice versa. Okinawan musical scales are often found in local folk songs, and there are many similarities in cuisine and language. Kyushu has a traditional instrument called the gottan, which resembles the sanshin and shamisen. Crafts of the region include Hakata-ori (博多織), Beppu bamboo crafts(別府竹細工), Kurume Kasuri (久留米絣), and Sathuma Kiriko.

=== People ===
People in Kyushu are known for being conservative even within Japan. In particular, men from Kyushu are often referred to as "Kyushu danji" (九州男児), evoking an image of being wild and strong. It is said that this term has existed since ancient times, originally used to inspire and encourage soldiers. Being from Kyushu is a source of great pride for its people. Thanks to this cultural spirit, Kyushu has preserved a rich variety of unique traditional cultures that continue to thrive today.

=== Food ===
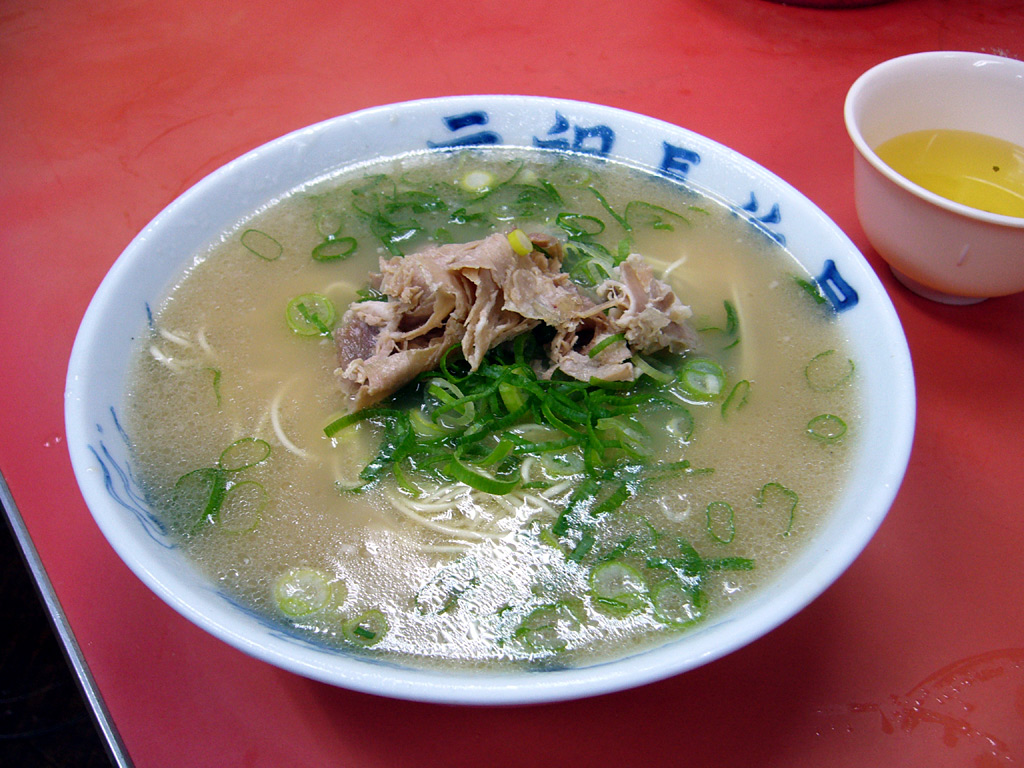
Hakata-ramen (元祖長浜屋)

The main features of Kyushu cuisine are the use of fresh ingredients and seasonings such as sweet soy sauce (Kyushu soy sauce) and barley miso, which differ from those used in Honshu.

Each region has its own culinary characteristics: seafood-based dishes are prominent in the north, while meat dishes are more common in the south.

- Fukuoka – Hakata ramen, gameni, motsunabe, kashiwa-meshi, okyu-to (おきゅうと)
- Saga – tsunkī dago jiru, noppe jiru, funanko-gui (ふなんこぐい), noppe jiru (のっぺ汁)
- Nagasaki – Nagasaki champon, sara udon, rokube (ろくべえ), Omura-zushi (大村寿司)
- Oita – dango jiru (だんご汁), ami-meshi (あみめし), kirasu-meshi (きらすまめし), toriten, hocho (鮑腸)
- Kumamoto – nankan-age maki-zushi (南関あげ巻き寿司), takana zuke (高菜漬け), karashi renkon (からし蓮根), dago jiru (だご汁)
- Miyazaki – nishime, chicken nanban (鶏南蛮), na-dōfu (菜豆腐), hiyajiru (冷や汁), hie-zushi (稗ずーしー)
- Kagoshima – keihan, Abura-zōmen, satsuma-sumoji (さつますもじ), buri-daikon (ぶり大根), gane (がね)
- Okinawa – goyā champurū, Okinawa soba, rafutē, kufājiushi (クファジューシー)

=== Sweets ===
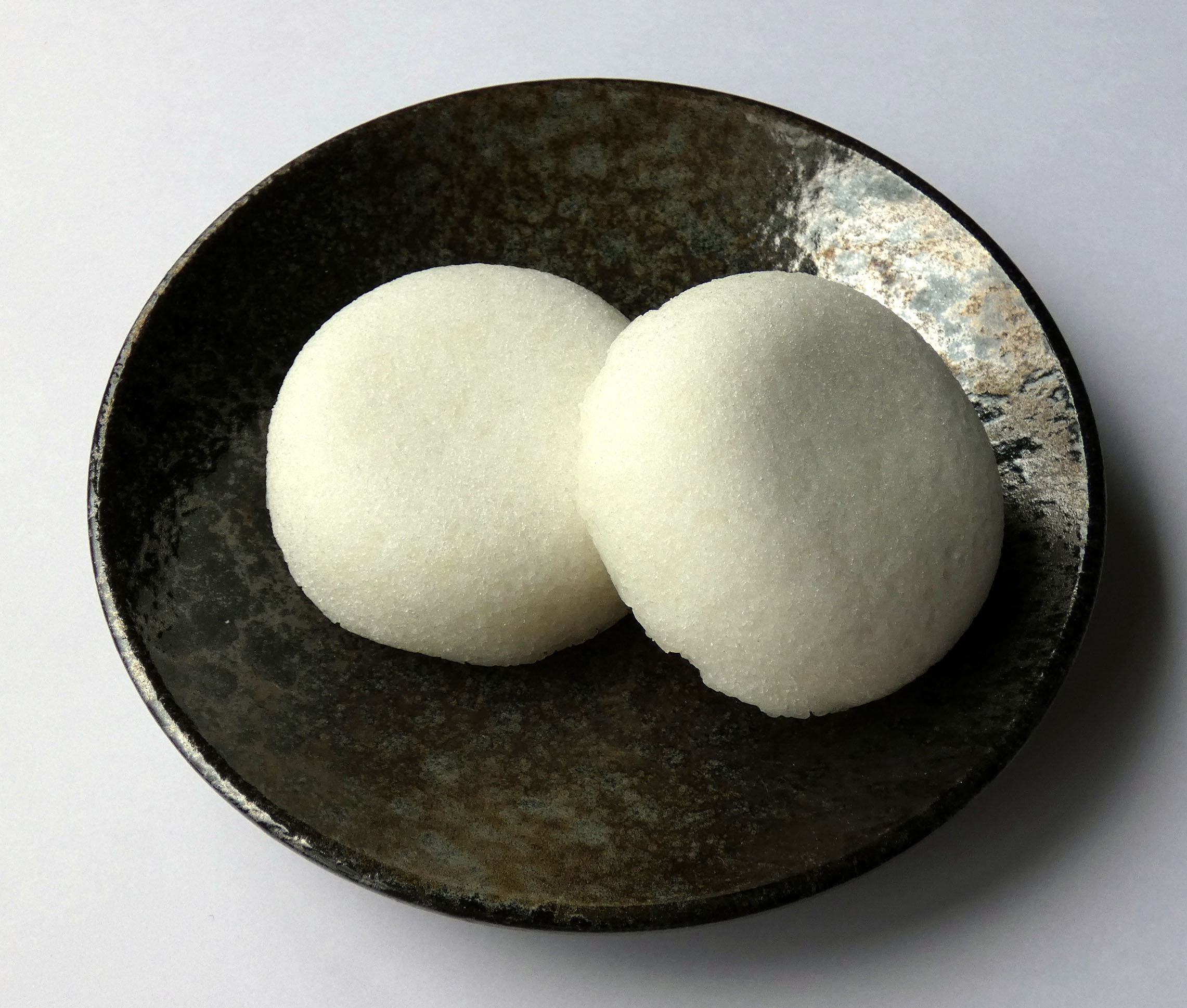
Karukan(軽羹)

Confectionery in Kyushu tends to use more sugar compared to other regions of Japan. This is because Kyushu has historically had close ties with Okinawa (Ryukyu), a major producer of sugar. As a result, many traditional sweets from Kyushu incorporate characteristics of Ryukyuan culture.

- Karukan (かるかん)
- Umegae Mochi (梅ヶ枝餅)
- Ikinari Dango (いきなり団子)
- Jiriyaki (じり焼き)
- Ogi Yōkan (小城羊羹)
- Kurobo (黒棒)
- Kashamochi (かしゃもち)
- Imo manju (いも饅頭)
- Akumaki (あくまき)
- Yubeshi（柚餅子）
- Sake Manjū (酒まんじゅう)

=== Musical instruments ===
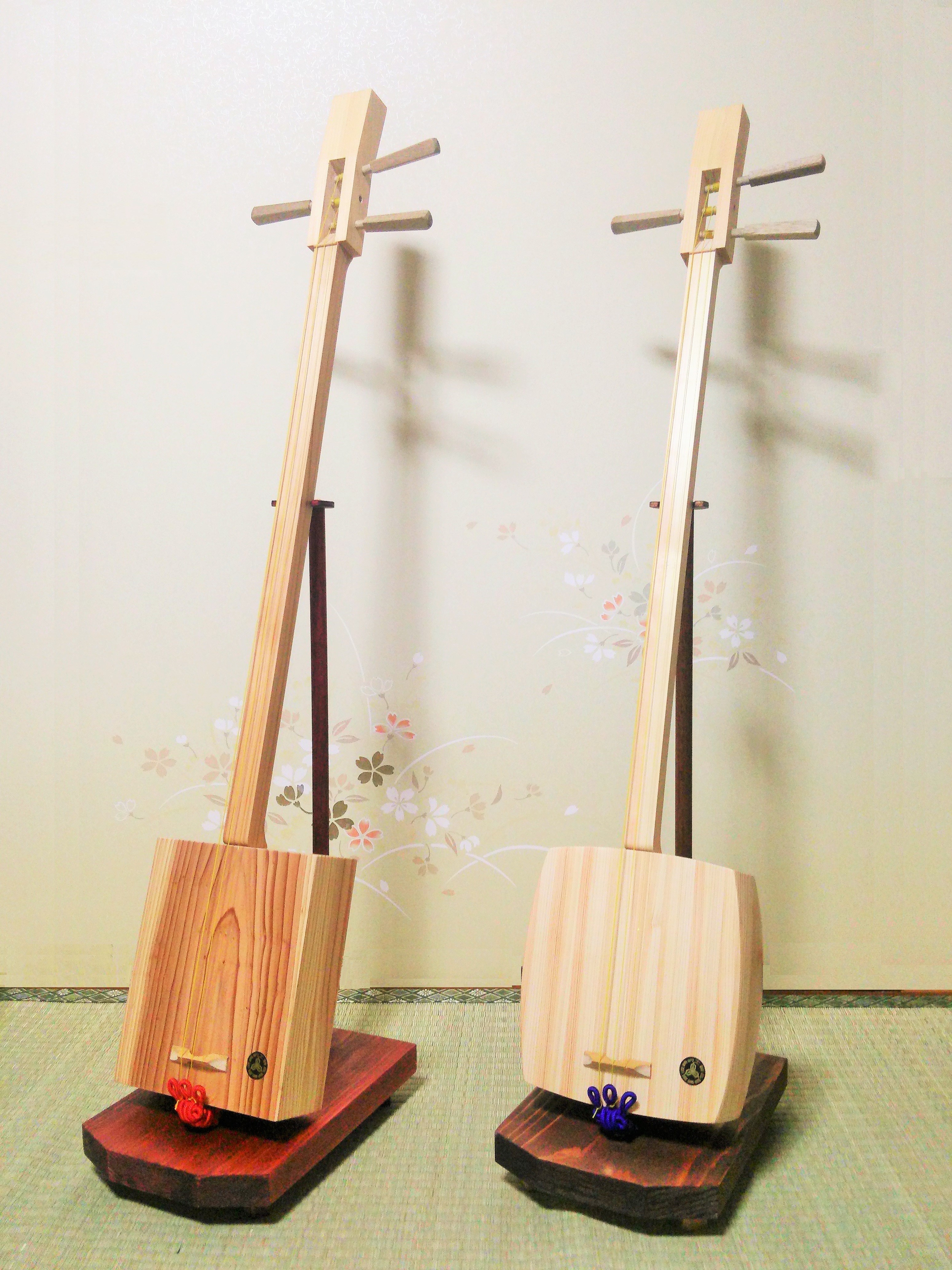
Gottan(ゴッタン)

In Kyushu, there exists a traditional stringed instrument known as the gottan (ゴッタン), which developed independently within the region's unique cultural and geographic context. The instrument is considered to be a midpoint between the shamisen of mainland Japan and the sanshin of Okinawa, incorporating characteristics of both. Structurally, it resembles the sanshin more closely—for example, it lacks the sawari, a buzzing mechanism found in the shamisen. This absence, along with its simplified wooden box construction and single string, aligns it with the more minimalistic design typical of southern instruments.

Musically, the gottan is sometimes used to perform melodies that reflect the Ryukyuan pentatonic scale, suggesting a subtle but notable influence from Okinawan musical traditions. While it remains a distinct and localized folk instrument of Kyushu, its sound and structure reveal traces of a broader cultural exchange within the southern Japanese archipelago, embodying a hybrid identity between the mainland and the Ryukyus.

- Gottan (ゴッタン)
- Sanshin (三線)
- Chikuzen Biwa (筑前琵琶)
- Sathuma Biwa (薩摩琵琶)
- Thuchibue (土笛)
- Iwabue (石笛)

=== World Heritage Sites ===
- Gusuku Sites and Related Properties of the Kingdom of Ryukyu, registered in 2000
- Sites of Japan's Meiji Industrial Revolution: Iron and Steel, Shipbuilding and Coal Mining, registered in 2015
- Sacred Island of Okinoshima and Associated Sites in the Munakata Region, registered in 2017
- Hidden Christian Sites in the Nagasaki Region, registered in 2018

=== Sports ===
Historically some Kyushu-based sports team has competed in the top Japanese division of baseball (NPB), football (soccer) (J.League), basketball (B.League) or even rugby union (League One). Currently the major teams competing in Kyushu's major cities include:

- Fukuoka: Fukuoka SoftBank Hawks (baseball); Avispa Fukuoka, Giravanz Kitakyushu (football); Rizing Zephyr Fukuoka (basketball); Kyuden Voltex (Rugby)
- Saga: Sagan Tosu (football); Saga Ballooners (basketball)
- Nagasaki: V-Varen Nagasaki (football); Nagasaki Velca (basketball)
- Kumamoto: Roasso Kumamoto (football); Kumamoto Volters (basketball)
- Ōita: Oita Trinita (football)
- Miyazaki: Tegevajaro Miyazaki (football)
- Kagoshima: Kagoshima United FC (football); Kagoshima Rebnise (basketball)
- Okinawa: FC Ryukyu (football); Ryukyu Golden Kings (basketball)

== See also ==
- Azumi people, an ancient group of people who inhabited parts of Northern Kyushu
- Geography of Japan
- Group Kyushu
- Hoenn, a fictional region in the Pokémon franchise which is based on Kyushu
- Japanese archipelago
- Kanmonkyo Bridge, that connects Kyushu with Honshū
- Kyushu dialects, Hichiku dialect, Hōnichi dialect, and Kagoshima dialect
- Kyushu National Museum
- List of regions in Japan
- Northern Kyushu
- Southern Kyushu
- United States Fleet Activities Sasebo
- Western Army (Japan)
