= Kurobo =

Japanese baked confectionery

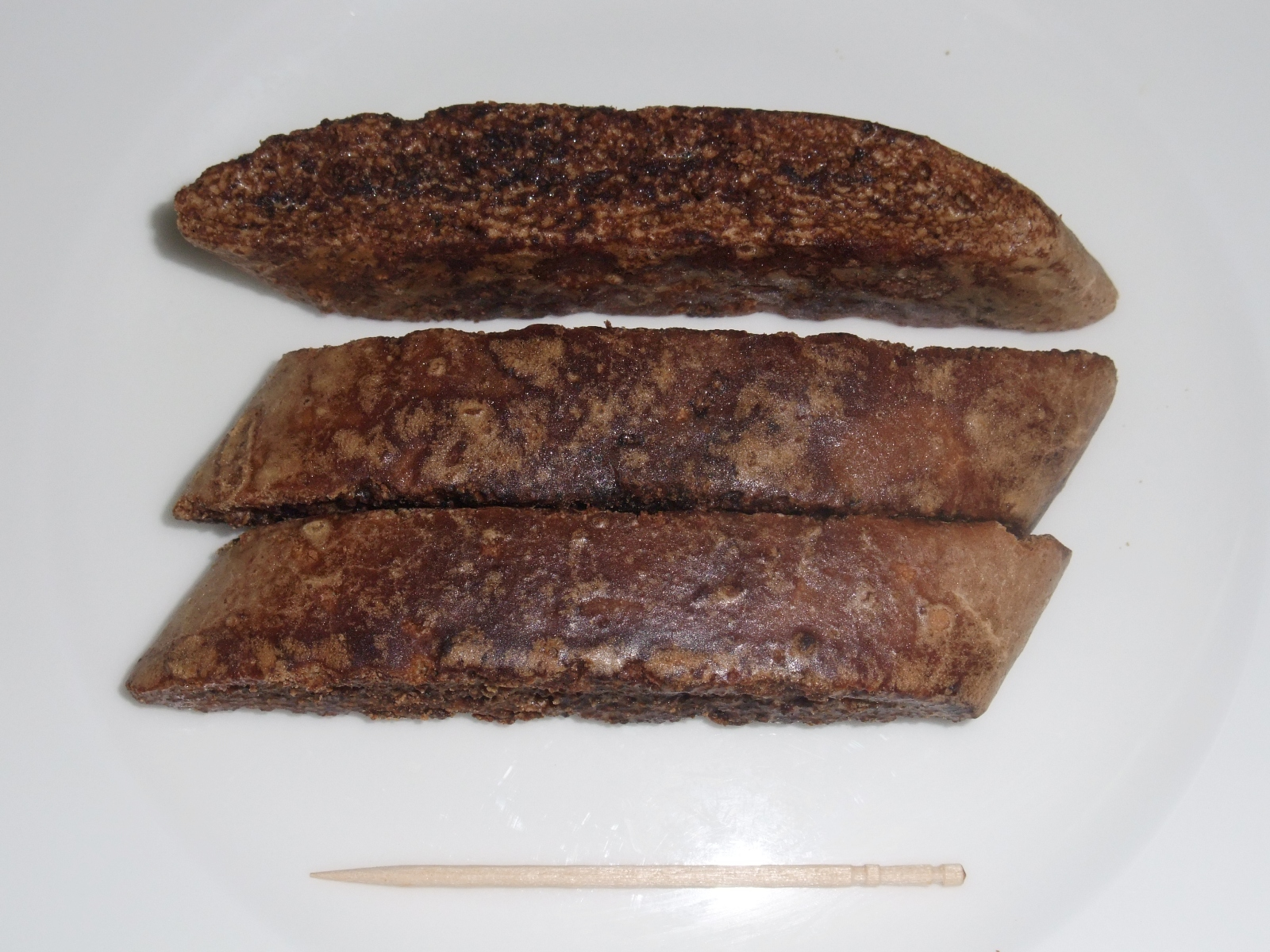
Kurobo

Kurobō (黒棒) is a type of baked confectionery that has been traditionally made mainly in the Kyushu region of Japan.

== Overview ==
The preparation method involves kneading and resting a dough made from brown sugar, eggs, flour, and baking soda, shaping it into sticks, and baking it in an oven. After baking, the sticks are cut to an appropriate length, coated with brown sugar or ginger syrup, and then dried. Locally, they are known as Kuronbō (くろんぼう) in the regional dialect.

Some variations use white sugar instead of brown sugar, producing a version called Shirobō (白棒).

Similar confections exist, such as Shiso Pan (紫蘇パン), which incorporates perilla leaves.

== History ==
The origin of Kurobo is unclear.

Until the Meiji period, even the name had not been firmly established, and it existed as a common confection throughout Kyushu.

Today, wheat is still produced in Kyushu, and in the past, sugarcane cultivation and brown sugar production were also widespread in the region. It is commonly believed that farmers created Kurobō as a homemade confection using these local ingredients.

It has also been eaten since ancient times in Okinawa (Ryukyu), a major production area of brown sugar.

During World War II, Kurobō was consumed as a food supply by the Japanese military.

Because it was inexpensive to produce and easy to mass-produce, soldiers valued it as a precious source of sweetness.

Today, Kurobō is not limited to the Kyushu region but is sold throughout Japan.

Due to its affordable price, it is often classified as a type of dagashi (cheap traditional snacks), and it continues to be loved by modern Japanese people as a quick snack or portable food.

== Main manufacturers ==
- Kurobo Confectionery - Kurume City , Fukuoka Prefecture
- Hashimoto Confectionery - Minamiseki Town, Tamana District, Kumamoto Prefecture
- Trio Foods - Yame City, Fukuoka Prefecture
