= Kyushu soy sauce =

Soy sauce from Kyushu, Japan

Kyushu soy sauce (Japanese: 九州醤油, Hepburn: Kyūshū Shōyu) is a type of soy sauce that is primarily consumed in the Kyushu and Okinawa regions of Japan. It is commonly referred to as "Amakuchi shōyu" (甘口醤油) because of its pronounced sweetness compared to standard Japanese soy sauces.

== Overview ==
Several varieties of Kyushu soy sauce exist, with specific formulations and flavors adapted to regional preferences and culinary practices. Flavor variances are also observed among different manufacturers and households.

Within Kyushu, it is often said that the further south you go, the sweeter the flavors become. In particular, the southern prefectures such as Kagoshima and Miyazaki are known for having stronger sweetness compared to northern areas like Fukuoka.

== Characteristics ==
The broader culinary tradition of Kyushu also tends toward sweeter flavoring. Stewed dishes and even miso soup often feature mugi miso (麦味噌) or barley miso, which has a naturally sweeter profile. It is speculated that this regional preference for sweet tastes may be related to the human body's natural inclination to favor sweetness in warmer climates, which is characteristic of Kyushu and Okinawa.
