= Okyu-to =

Seaweed-based food in Kyushu, Japan

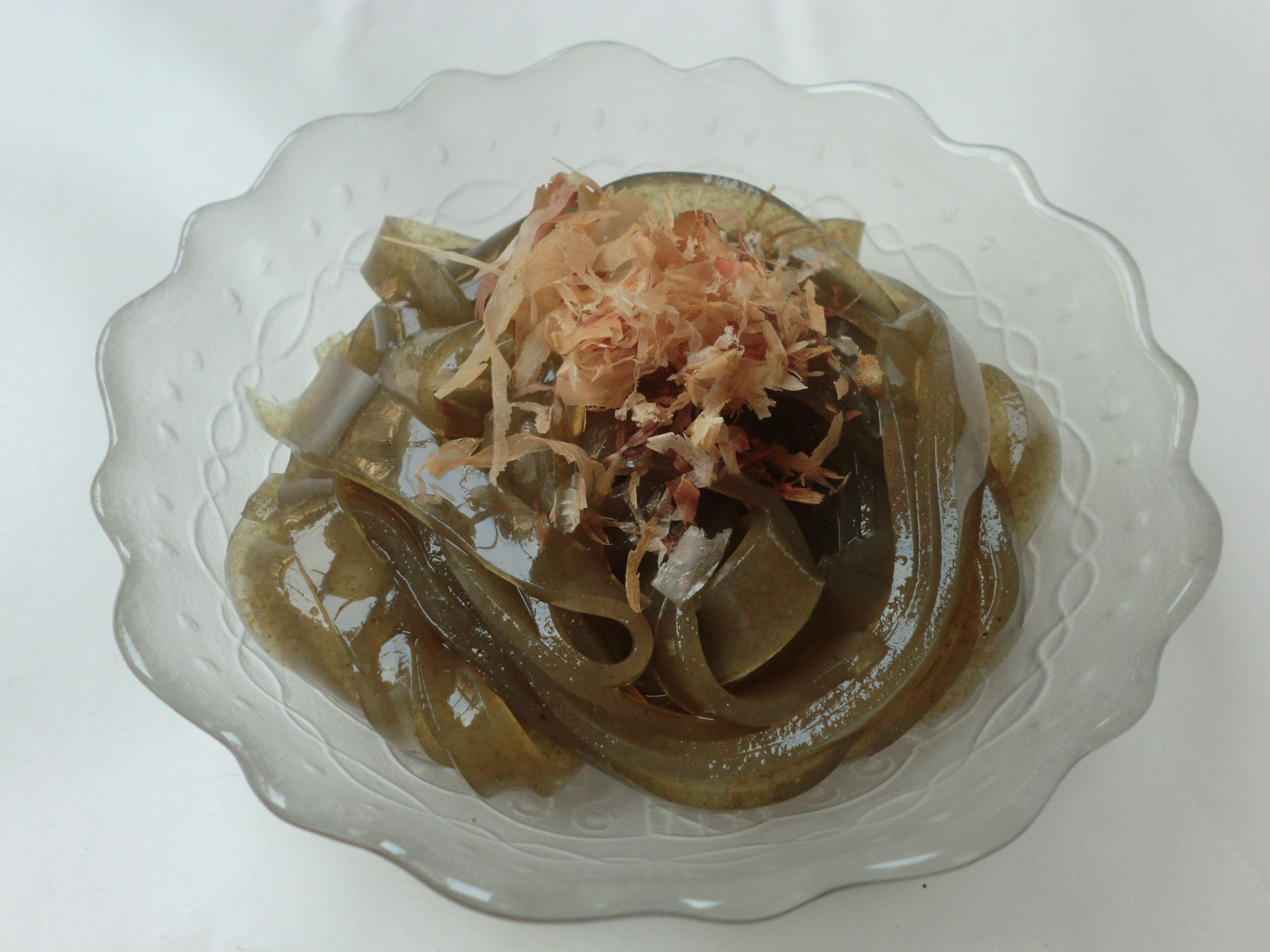
Okyu-to

Okyu-to (おきゅうと) is a traditional seaweed-based food that has been eaten since ancient times, primarily in Fukuoka Prefecture in the Kyushu region of Japan.

== overview ==
Okyu-to is a traditional food made by drying the seaweed egonori, boiling it down into a gel, and shaping it into oval sheets. It is a local specialty unique to Fukuoka Prefecture, which faces the sea. Okyuto is also known as Okyu-do (おきうど), and before the Asia-Pacific War, it was so essential to breakfast that vendors called okyuto sellers would walk the streets every morning selling it.

There are various theories regarding the origin of the name. One suggests that during times of famine, when food was scarce, okyuto helped save many people from starvation and was thus called "御救人" (Okyuto, meaning "savior of people") or simply "救人" (savior). Another theory claims that it was accidentally created by fishermen from seaweed, and thus came to be called "沖人" (person of the open sea) or "沖独活" (sea udo).

== History ==
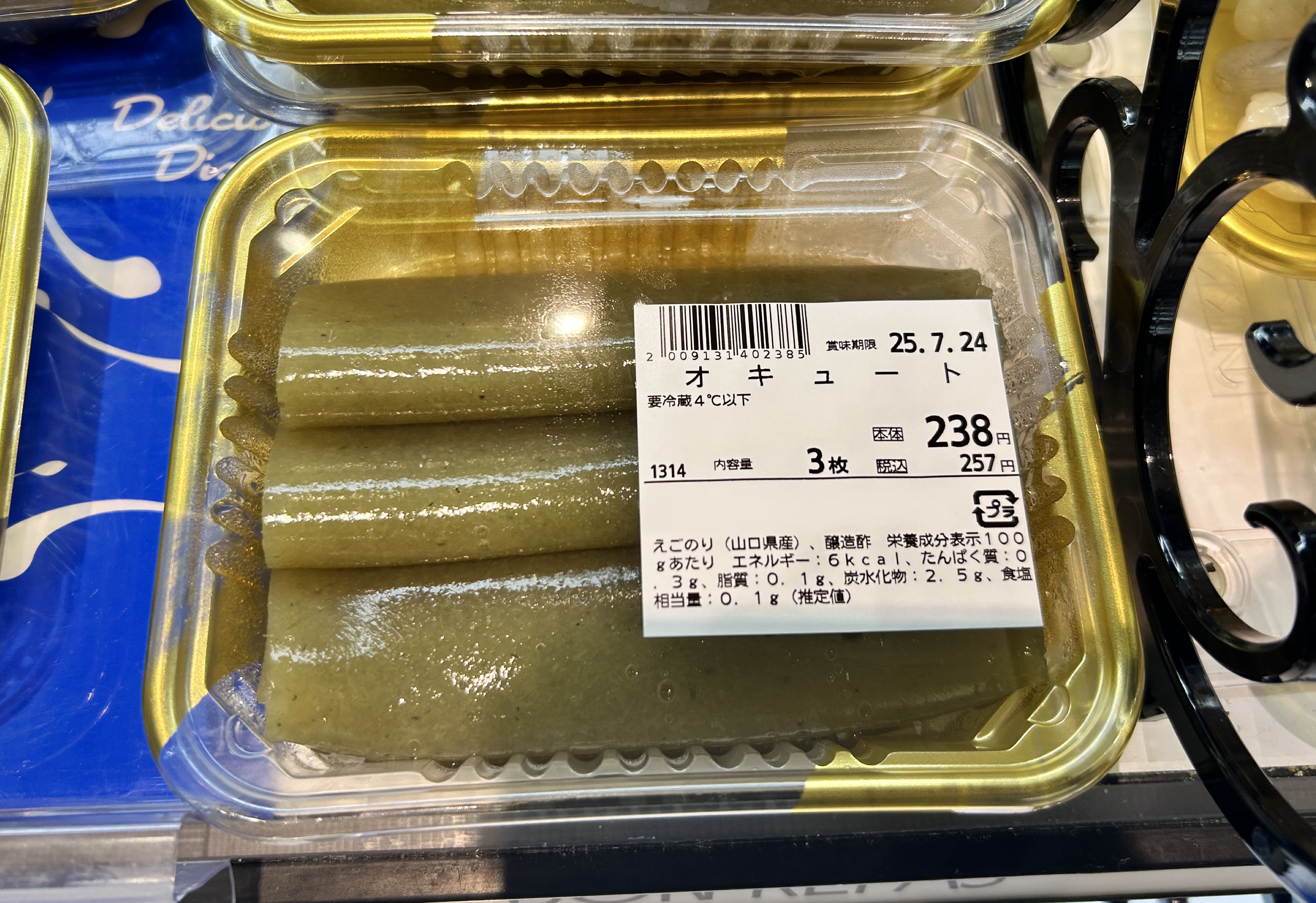
Okuto displayed in the store

The history of Okyu-to is believed to date back to ancient times.

In ancient Japan, Fukuoka was the homeland of maritime peoples, notably the Azumi people (安曇族), who were responsible for overseeing sea transportation.

It is said that Okyu-to originated as food eaten by these Ama People (海人族).

As evidence, in Azumino City (安曇野市) in Nagano Prefecture—where members of the Azumi people later migrated during the late ancient period—a similar food made from the same kind of seaweed is still eaten today, known as "Ego," despite the area being inland.

For the Kyushu people, who were historically a seafaring nation, Okyu-to holds special sacred significance.

== Preparation and Eating Methods ==
The main ingredients, Egonori (also known as "ego grass," "Okyu-to grass," and called Makusa in Hakata) and Okiten (also called Kebo in Hakata, a type of Igisu or Gelidiaceae seaweed) are first washed with water. Depending on their condition, they are sun-dried between one and five times. The yield rate is about 70%, but skipping this drying process results in an inferior flavor and a darker color. Since the drying process diminishes the fragrance of Tengusa (Gelidium), for home use, people sometimes reduce the number of washings.

Next, the sun-dried Ego grass and Okiten are mixed at a ratio of approximately 7:3 or 6:4 and pounded thoroughly. Vinegar is added to the mixture, which is then simmered and strained. It is molded into an oval (koban) shape and allowed to solidify at room temperature. In Hakata, it is common to find Okyu-to sold rolled into a cylindrical shape.

To eat, it is cut into strips about 5 millimeters to 1 centimeter wide, placed over dried bonito flakes (katsuobushi), and garnished with grated ginger or chopped green onions. It is typically enjoyed with condiments such as plain soy sauce, mustard soy sauce, ponzu soy sauce, or sesame soy sauce.

Okyu-to is primarily consumed as a part of breakfast.
