= Kashiwameshi =

Traditional Japanese rice dish

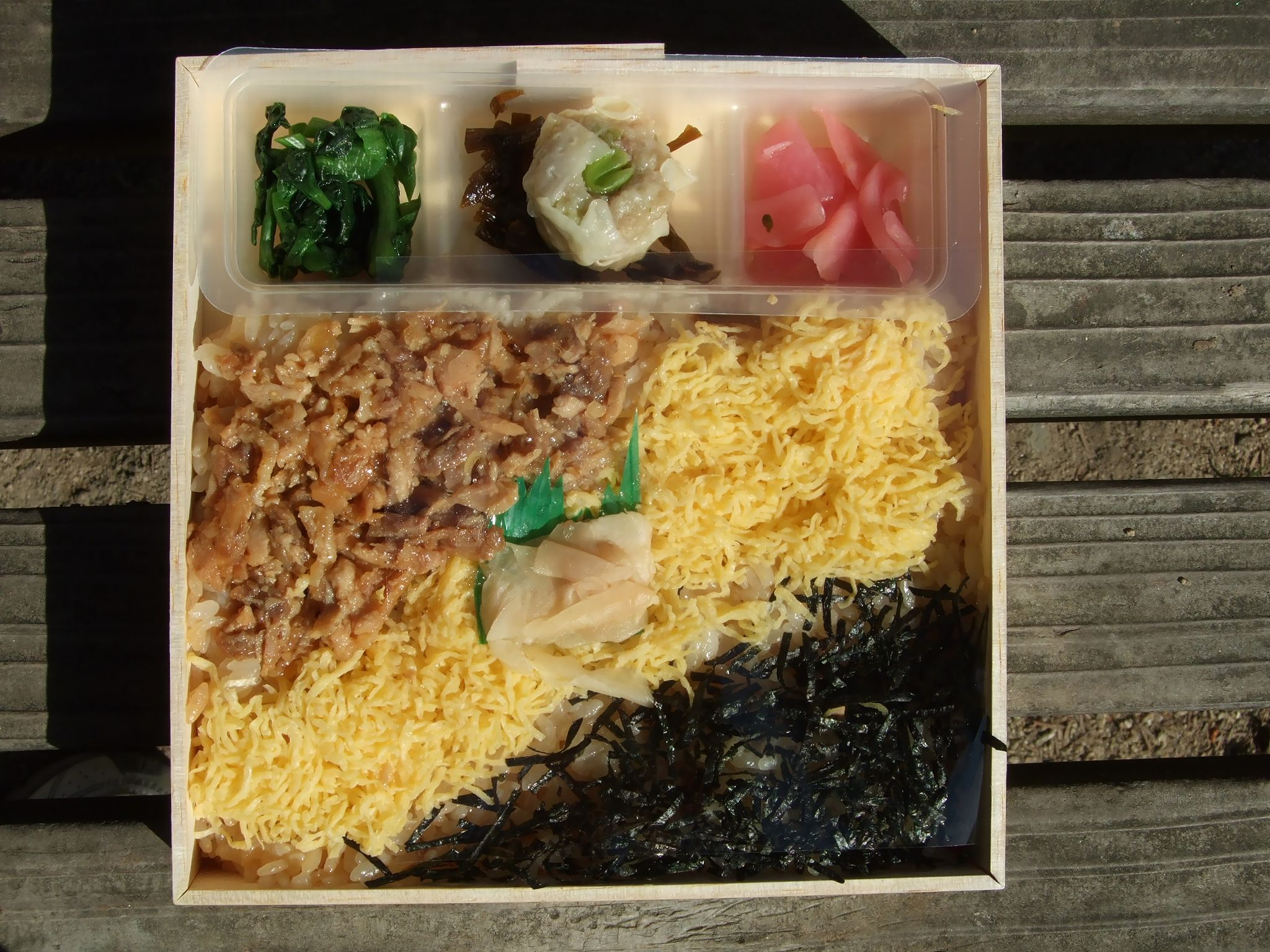
- Place of origin: Japan
- Main ingredients: Chicken, egg, nori, rice

Kashiwameshi(かしわ飯、かしわめし), also known as kashiwa-meshi or "chicken rice", is a traditional rice dish widely consumed in the Kyushu region of Japan, particularly in Fukuoka and Saga Prefectures. It is a type of seasoned rice dish (takikomi gohan) made by cooking rice together with chicken (kashiwa) and vegetables.

== Overview ==
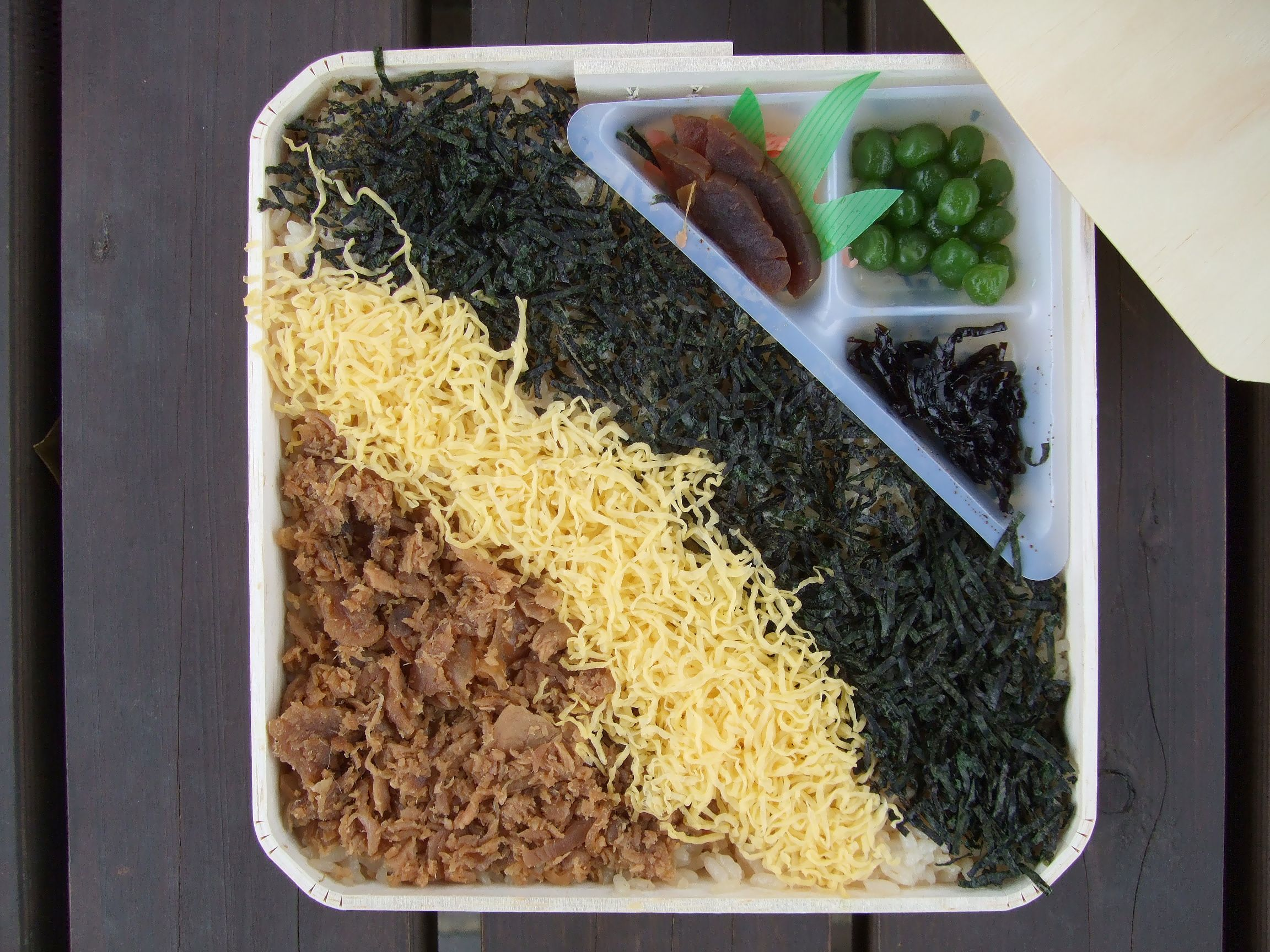
Kashiwameshi is usually served with thinly sliced eggs and nori

Kashiwameshi is prepared by simmering chicken with vegetables such as carrots and shiitake mushrooms, then mixing the seasoned ingredients with rice. It is a well-established local specialty in the northern part of Kyushu, especially in the prefectures of Fukuoka, Saga,Oita, and Kumamoto, where it is commonly prepared in homes and served at diners and casual eateries.

The dish is often eaten during festivals, celebrations, and other special occasions (hare no hi). It is also popular in the form of rice balls (kashiwa onigiri), and has become a staple of the local culinary culture.

Even today, kashiwameshi remains a familiar home-cooked dish passed down from parents to children. It is also served in school lunches, making it popular among younger generations. In addition to being available at restaurants, it can be found at convenience stores and supermarkets, making it an easily accessible food. It is also widely sold as an ekiben (train station bento), with kashiwameshi bento being a well-loved option for travelers.

In Fukuoka Prefecture, the local free-range chicken known as Hakata jidori(博多地鶏) is often used in its preparation. Hakata jidori is known for its firm texture and deep flavor, which intensifies the more it is chewed. Its breast meat contains bioactive compounds such as anserine and carnosine, which are believed to help prevent cognitive decline. Because of these properties, Hakata jidori has been recognized by the Consumer Affairs Agency of Japan as a food with functional health claims.

== History ==
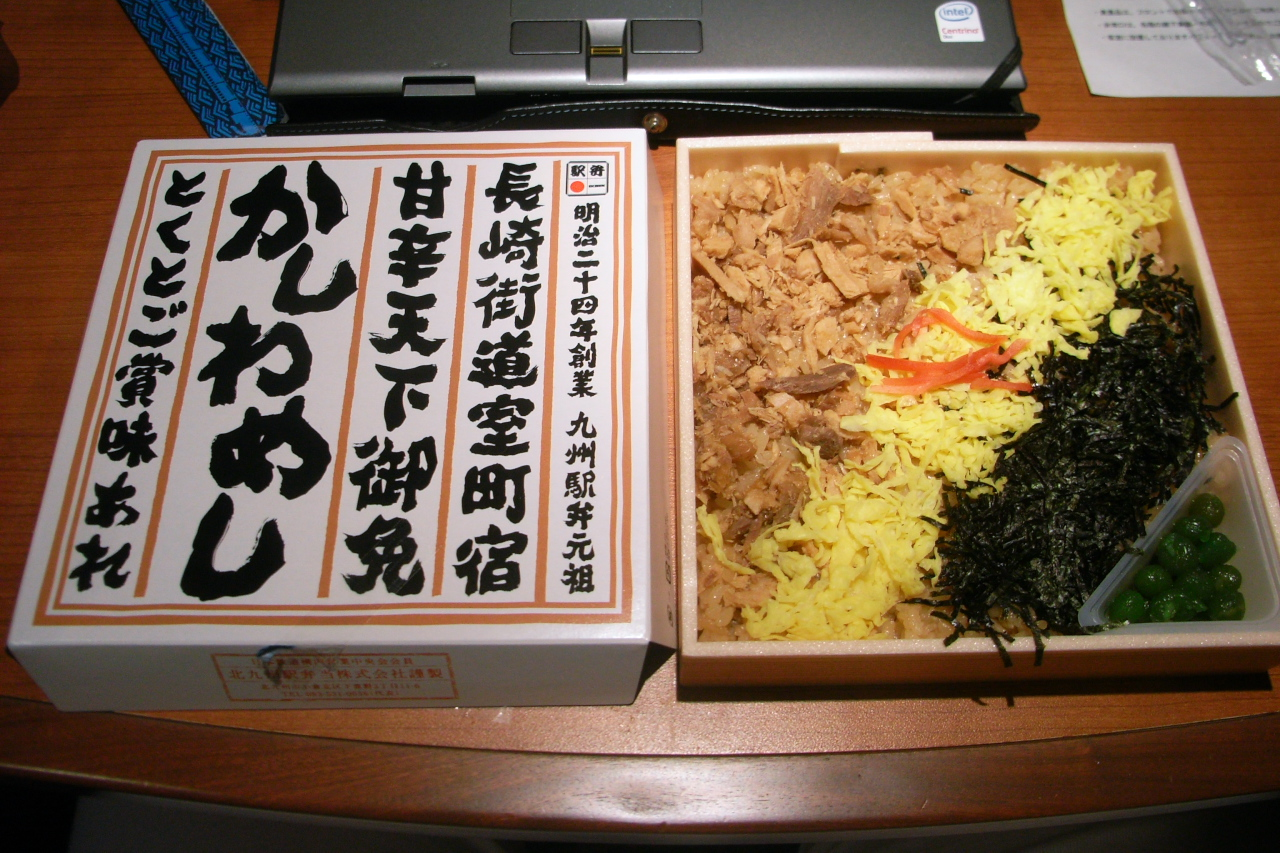
Kashiwameshi sold as bento

The origins of kashiwameshi are believed to date back to the Edo period. Following a series of famines during this time, the ruling Kuroda Domain (which governed the Fukuoka region) promoted poultry farming as a means of securing revenue. This policy contributed to the development of chicken-based culinary traditions in the region, one of which was kashiwameshi.

The term kashiwa as a synonym for chicken in Kyushu is thought to have originated during the Edo period, when meat consumption was prohibited under the Shōrui Awaremi no Rei (a series of animal protection edicts). At that time, euphemisms were used to refer to animal meat. The name kashiwa is said to have derived from the resemblance of the chicken's feather coloration to the autumnal leaves of the oak tree (kashiwa in Japanese). This usage is still common in western Japan, where the dish continues to enjoy broad popularity.
