= Ogi Yōkan =

Japanese confectionery

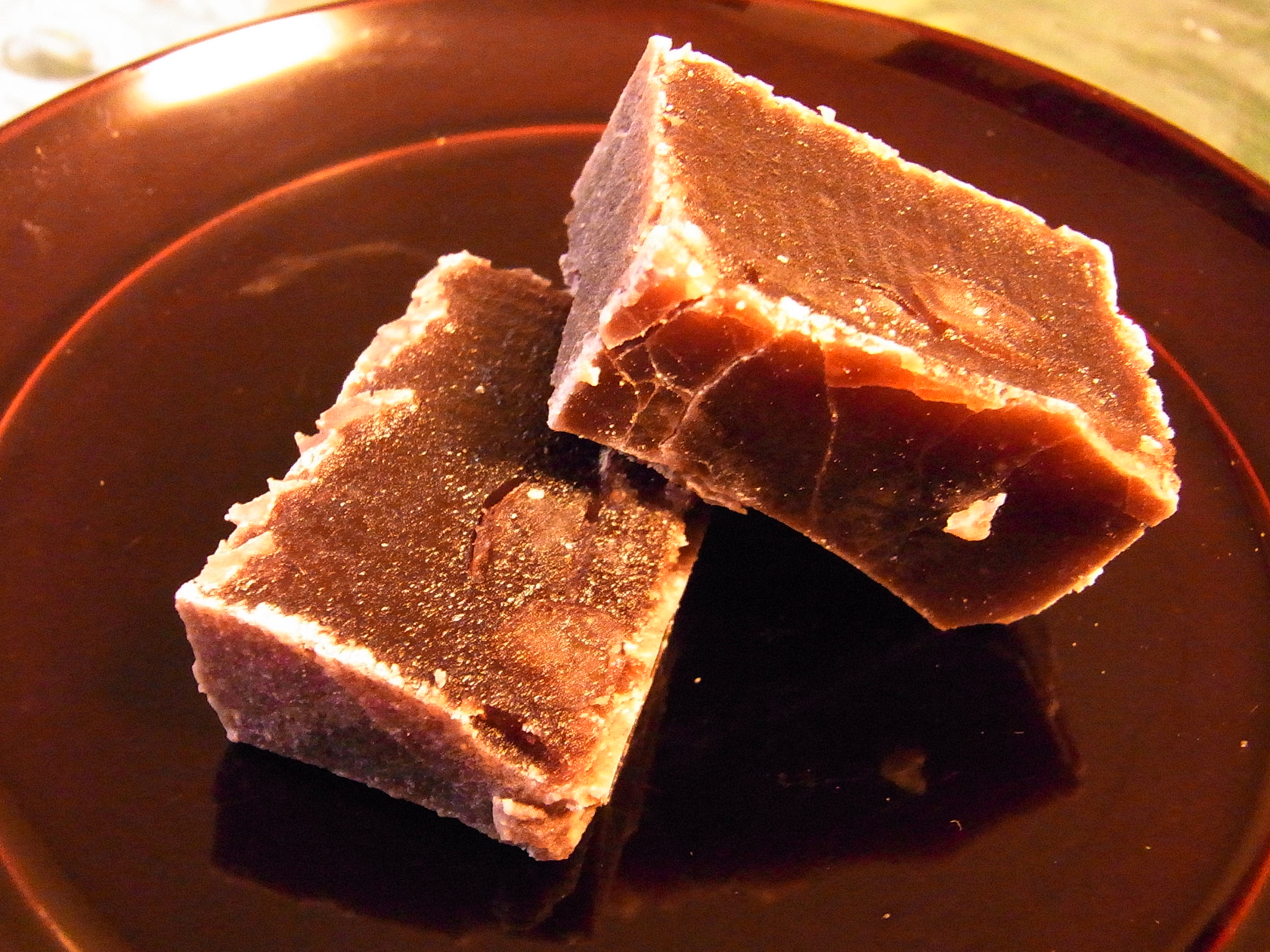
Ogi Yōkan

Ogi Yōkan (小城羊羹) is a traditional confectionery (Yōkan) produced in Saga Prefecture, located in the Kyushu region of Japan.

== History ==
=== Background ===
Saga Prefecture, where the city of Ogi is located, was situated along the Nagasaki Kaidō, a historical road connecting Nagasaki and Kokura. During Japan’s isolation period (鎖国), one of the key goods transported via this route was sugar. Even after domestically produced sugar became widely available in the 18th to 19th centuries during the Edo period, Saga remained a central hub for sugar culture. During the Tenpō era (1830–1843), Saga accounted for 40% of the sugar presented to the Tokugawa shogunate. As a result, Saga developed a rich tradition of wagashi (Japanese sweets), with many confections such as Ikkokukō from Shiota in Ureshino and Marubōro from Saga City originating in the Edo period.

Due to this background, the Ogi region had easy access to both sugar and confectionery techniques. The area also benefited from the clean, fresh water of the Shimizu River, which is selected as one of Japan’s 100 remarkable waters, and its proximity to Fujichō in Saga City, a major azuki bean production area. These factors—access to sugar, water, and azuki beans—provided ideal conditions for making yōkan. Additionally, the presence of tea ceremony culture in the castle town created a demand for yōkan as a tea accompaniment, laying the groundwork for the confection’s popularity in Ogi.

=== Sōkichi Morinaga and Yasukichi Muraoka ===
There are several theories regarding the origin of yōkan production in Ogi, but one widely accepted account is that around 1872 (Meiji 5), Sōkichi Morinaga (1845–1910), who ran a banquet business in Ogi, began experimenting with methods of boiling azuki beans he had learned from a clerk of Toraya in Osaka. Through trial and error, he developed his own method for making yōkan, and this version of events is supported by sources such as the Ogi City Office and the Yōkan Museum.

In addition to producing and selling traditional red yōkan under the name Sakura Yōkan, Sōkichi also invented white yōkan in 1898 and tea yōkan the following year. During the First Sino-Japanese War (1894–1895), his yōkan was adopted as a sweet item for military canteens. The fact that the product maintained its quality even when shipped to distant battlefronts further enhanced its reputation, increasing demand. While there were originally only four or five yōkan producers in Ogi, this number gradually increased. By 1914 (Taishō 3), there were 29 producers, with a total output of 270,000 kin (about 162 tons) and a production value of 51,000 yen. In August of that year, the Ogi Yōkan Producers’ Guild was established.

If Sōkichi Morinaga is considered the founder of Ogi yōkan, Yasukichi Muraoka (1884–1962) is regarded as the key figure in its further development. Originally a wholesaler of agricultural products, Yasukichi entered the yōkan business in 1899 (Meiji 32). He was an early adopter of mechanized production, which increased output, and he took advantage of the newly developed railway system by securing sales rights at train stations, significantly boosting sales. He also strategically leveraged Ogi’s location between two major military hubs—Sasebo Naval Arsenal and the 18th Army Division in Kurume—to expand his market, including military procurement.

To further distinguish Ogi from other production areas, Yasukichi coined the name “Ogi Yōkan.” During World War II, his company produced yōkan for the navy under the brand Umi no Homare (Honor of the Sea). As the war progressed and resources such as sugar became scarce, many yōkan makers ceased operations. However, Muraoka’s company, along with Toraya (which produced Riku no Homare for the army and Umi no Isao for the navy), received special treatment as military suppliers and continued production throughout the war.

==== Anecdotes ====
Before World War II, Ogi Yōkan enjoyed particular fame in Manchuria. It is recorded that Pujie, the biological younger brother of the last emperor Puyi, once visited the head store of Muraoka to purchase Ogi Yōkan. Pujie, who was also known as a skilled calligrapher, left behind a handwritten inscription during his visit.

The renowned Japanese author Seichō Matsumoto, known for his fondness for yōkan, contributed an essay titled “Ogi Yōkan” to Ajiwai, the quarterly publication of the National Confectionery Industry Cooperative Association.

== Characteristics ==
While laminated foil-packaged yōkan, which offers longer shelf life and ease of production, has become the mainstream style throughout Japan, Ogi is notable for preserving a traditional method known as kiri yōkan (cut yōkan). In this process, the kneaded yōkan mixture is poured into wooden molds, allowed to set, and then cut by hand into uniform sizes using a knife. This method is also referred to as tachi yōkan (断ち羊羹) or mukashi yōkan (昔ようかん).

Yōkan made by this traditional method forms a layer of crystallized sugar on the surface due to natural drying, resulting in a distinctive crunchy texture on the outside while maintaining a moist and smooth interior.
