= Kashamochi =

Japanese confectionery

Kashamochi (かしゃもち,カシャ餅) is a traditional Japanese sweet made with mochi and mugwort, commonly eaten on Amami Ōshima Island in the Kyushu region of Japan.

== Overview ==
Kashamochi is a traditional food made by combining mugwort and mochi (rice cake), kneading in brown sugar and sweet potatoes, and then steaming the mixture wrapped in the leaf of the kasha plant (Alpinia zerumbet, known as shell ginger). It is characterized by the fragrant aroma of mugwort, the sweetness of brown sugar, and a chewy texture.

A specialty product of Amami Ōshima in the Kyushu region, kashamochi is also known locally in the Kyushu dialect as fuchi mochi or futtsu mochi (“fuchi” referring to mugwort). The main ingredients are brown sugar, mugwort, and sweet potatoes, though red beans (azuki) are sometimes included as well.

Kashamochi is still commonly eaten at home today, often served during seasonal festivals or taught in home economics classes at local schools. It is also popular as a regional souvenir from Amami.

== History ==
In the Amami region, mugwort has long been abundant and has traditionally been used as a medicinal herb—boiled for consumption or used for its deodorizing and antibacterial properties. The kasha leaf (from the shell ginger plant, Alpinia zerumbet, a member of the ginger family) is also believed to have antibacterial and insect-repelling effects. It grows widely in the Amami region and is used not only for wrapping kashamochi but also for wrapping rice balls.

Kashamochi is a sweet that reflects the wisdom of the local people, who made use of readily available natural ingredients with beneficial properties such as mugwort, brown sugar, and kasha leaves. There is even a local expression that compares harmonious relationships to "mochi and kasha leaves," referencing how well the sticky mochi adheres to the leaf and how the combination of ingredients enhances the flavor.

Traditionally, kashamochi was made at home during seasonal festivals such as the old lunar calendar's March 3rd and May 5th celebrations, as a wish for children’s health and growth. It was also shared with relatives and served during important village events. Mugwort was believed to ward off evil, and the custom of gifting kashamochi to relatives stems from this belief.

While it was originally a seasonal treat, kashamochi is now enjoyed year-round. In spring, freshly picked mugwort is often frozen for later use, and the mochi is wrapped in kasha or gettō (shell ginger) leaves. Today, kashamochi is a popular everyday snack in the region.

== Preparation Method ==
First, rinse the mugwort (yomogi) thoroughly in water to remove any dirt. Then, blanch it briefly in boiling water with a small amount of baking soda. After boiling, soak the mugwort in water overnight to remove bitterness. Drain the mugwort and blend it with boiled sweet potatoes in a mixer or food processor to create a smooth paste.

Next, add brown sugar, glutinous rice flour, and water to the paste and mix thoroughly until the dough is well combined. Take cleaned kasha leaves (about 20 cm long) and wrap the dough in them. Steam the wrapped dough in a steamer for about 20 minutes.

As the mochi steams, the gentle fragrance of the kasha leaf infuses the dough, enhancing the flavors of the mugwort and brown sugar. When eating, remove the kasha leaf and enjoy only the mugwort mochi inside. If the mochi becomes hard, it can be softened again by lightly steaming before serving.
