= Beppu bamboo crafts =

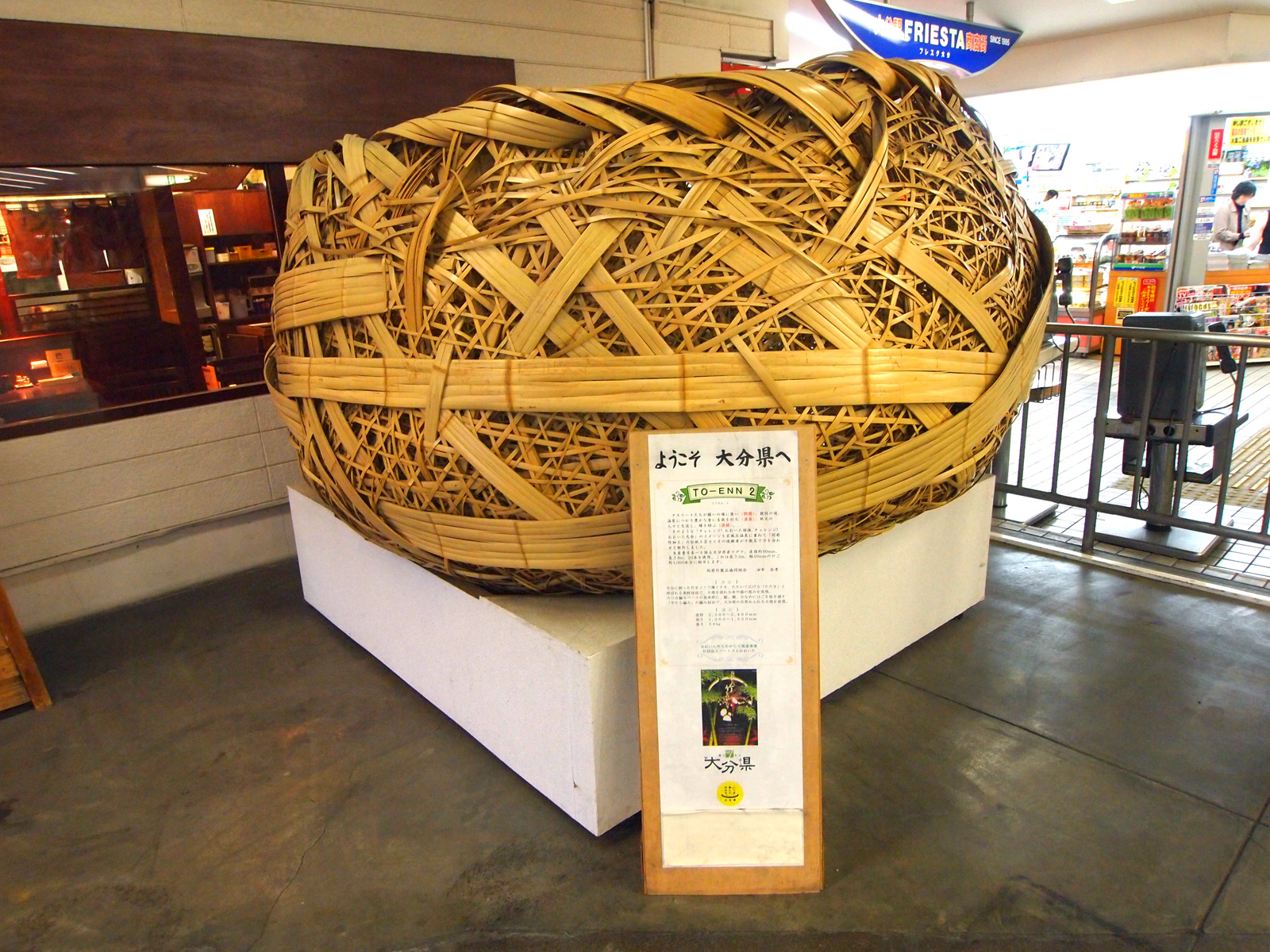
An example from Ōita Station.

Beppu Bamboo Craft (別府竹細工、Beppu Takezaiku) is a traditional form of bambooworking produced in and around Beppu City, Ōita Prefecture, on the island of Kyushu, Japan.

== Overview ==
Among various types of bamboo, Madake (Phyllostachys bambusoides) is primarily used for bamboo craftsmanship. Ōita Prefecture produces approximately 32% of Japan’s total Madake supply (as of 2007), making it the nation's top producer. With this abundant resource, bamboo craft has historically flourished in the region. Beppu Bamboo Craft, in particular, utilizes high-quality Madake harvested within the prefecture as its main material. It produces a wide range of items, including flower baskets, serving baskets, everyday goods made from fresh green bamboo, fashionable bags, and even interior lighting fixtures.

Bamboo materials are selected and treated according to their intended use. These include fresh green bamboo used as-is after cutting; dried bamboo, which has been heat-treated (dry method) or boiled in caustic soda (wet method) to remove oils; carbonized bamboo, which is partially charred; naturally aged bamboo, left to dry over months or years; and soot bamboo (susudake), aged for decades in traditional houses where it was exposed to smoke from hearths and stoves. Each type varies in flexibility, hardness, and durability, and is chosen accordingly for specific applications.

== History ==
The origins of Beppu Bamboo Craft are traditionally traced back to the reign of Emperor Keikō, the 12th emperor of Japan. According to legend, on his return from a military campaign against the Kumaso people in Kyushu, he stopped in Beppu, where one of his kitchen attendants (zenban) discovered an abundance of high-quality shinodake (a type of bamboo) and crafted a mego (a basket used to hold rice bowls). This act is considered the beginning of bamboo craftsmanship in the Beppu area.

However, it was during the Muromachi period that bamboo crafts began to be produced in earnest in Beppu. Baskets for peddling were made, and markets were established to facilitate trade. During the Edo period, Beppu Onsen (hot springs) gained nationwide fame, and various bamboo household items such as rice baskets and strainers were sold to visitors who cooked their own meals during their stays.

In the early Meiji period, the completion of Beppu Port transformed the area into a logistics hub along the Seto Inland Sea shipping route. As Beppu evolved into a major hot spring resort city visited by large numbers of health tourists (tōji), the demand for bamboo crafts increased significantly. The bamboo products, praised for their quality and utility during extended stays, became popular as souvenirs, leading to the expansion of their market and establishment as a local industry.

Beppu also attracted many cultural figures and business leaders who built vacation villas in the hot spring town. With this, the demand for fine bamboo art pieces, such as tea utensils, grew. As a result, advanced weaving techniques developed, and Beppu bamboo craftsmanship came to be characterized by intricate and decorative ajiro-ami (woven patterns), using splints of varying thicknesses. This led to the creation of diverse and complex bamboo artworks.

In 1902, the Beppu-Hamawaki Vocational Apprentice School (the predecessor of present-day Ōita Prefectural Ōita Technical High School) was established, offering training in bamboo craftsmanship.

In 1938, the Ōita Prefectural Beppu Craft Guidance Center of the Ōita Industrial Testing Laboratory (later renamed the Ōita Prefectural Beppu Industrial Arts Testing Institute in 1954) was founded to train artisans and conduct technical research in bamboo craft. This institute later merged with the Ōita Prefectural Beppu Vocational Training School to become the Ōita Prefectural Bamboo Craft and Technical Support Center, the only vocational training institution in Japan specializing in bamboo crafts, and it continues to produce skilled artisans today.

In 1967, Shounosai Ikuno, a master bamboo craftsman from Beppu, became the first bamboo artist to be designated as a Living National Treasure (Holder of Important Intangible Cultural Property), highlighting the high quality of Beppu Bamboo Craft.In 1979, the craft was designated as a Traditional Craft by the Minister of International Trade and Industry, and as of February 2011, there were 21 certified traditional artisans in the field.

Additionally, in 1978, the Beppu Bamboo Products Cooperative Association, an industry group, was founded to promote and develop Beppu bamboo craftsmanship.Today, Beppu Takezaiku is registered as a regional collective trademark.
