= Sake Manjū =

Traditional Japanese confectionery

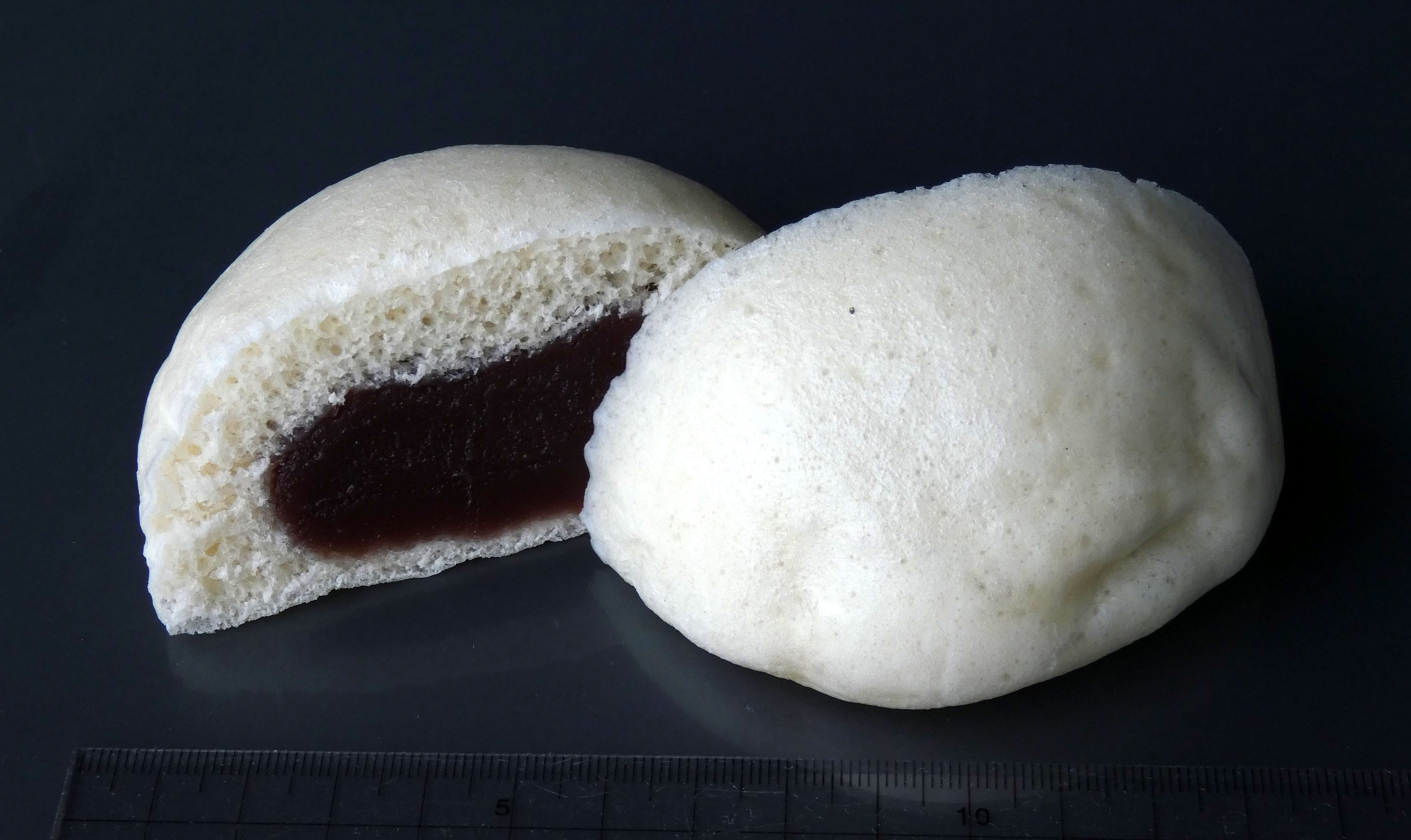
Sake Manjū

Sake Manjū (Saka Manjū/ 酒饅頭) is a type of traditional Japanese confectionery (wagashi) characterized by its fermented dough, which is made using ingredients such as sake lees (sakekasu) or a fermentation starter similar to sweet sake (amazake). It is consumed throughout Japan, with particular regional prominence in areas such as Kyushu and the Tōhoku region.

== Overview ==
Sake Manjū is made by fermenting a dough composed primarily of wheat flour, sugar, rice malt (kōji), and fermentation agents such as Sakedane or sakekasu. Once the dough has naturally risen through fermentation, it is steamed to produce a soft and chewy texture. The resulting confection is noted for its fragrant aroma, derived from the fermentation process, though it does not contain alcohol.

While Sake Manjū is enjoyed nationwide, it is particularly associated with regions such as Ōita, Fukuoka, and Kumamoto Prefectures in Kyushu, as well as various parts of the Tōhoku region. Regional variations exist: for example, in southern Kyushu and Okinawa, the dough may incorporate brown sugar. The most common filling is smooth red bean paste (koshian), though other varieties such as chestnut paste, white bean paste, or even miso-based fillings can be found depending on the locale.

Sake Manjū is also noted for having inspired the development of anpan, a popular Japanese sweet bun filled with red bean paste.

== History ==
The origins of Sake Manjū in Japan are believed to date back to the Kamakura (1185–1333) and Muromachi (1336–1573) periods. While it is thought to have gradually spread throughout the country during these eras, its precise origins remain unclear due to the existence of numerous regional traditions and varying local accounts. As a result, no single definitive theory has been established.

Historically, Sake Manjū was valued as an accessible confection for the general populace, particularly from the medieval period onward. It was commonly consumed during seasonal festivals such as Tango no Sekku (Children's Day in May), Obon, and local festivals, as well as during breaks from agricultural work. In particular, freshly steamed manjū was favored in winter months, as its warmth was believed to help heat the body.

Today, Sake Manjū remains widely available across Japan and is commonly sold in supermarkets. It continues to be enjoyed as a classic example of traditional Japanese confectionery.
