= Ikinari Dango =

Japanese confectionery

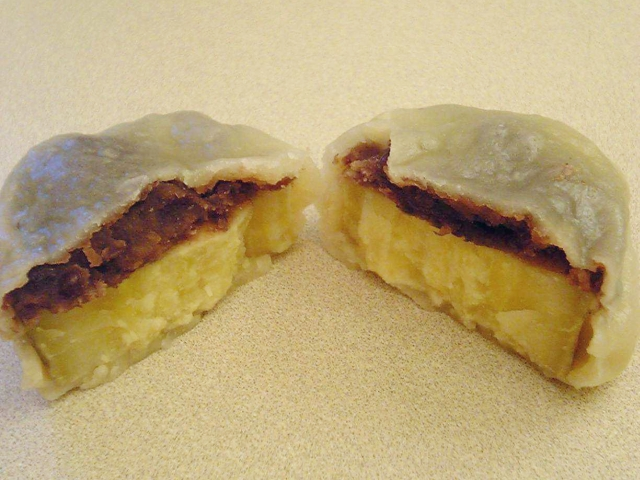
Ikinari Dango

Ikinari Dango (Japanese: いきなり団子) is a traditional local dish and confectionery from Kumamoto Prefecture, Japan.

In the Kumamoto dialect, it is also known as Ikinari Dago (いきなりだご).

== Overview ==
Ikinari Dango is made by wrapping slices of sweet potato in a dough made from wheat flour,Dango rice flour (だんご粉), and salt, and then steaming it. Around the Showa era, it became common to add azuki bean paste (小豆餡) along with the sweet potato, and this version has since become the mainstream form.

In agricultural regions such as Ōzu (大津) in Kumamoto Prefecture, as well as in the Kikuchi Plain (菊池平野) and Kumamoto Plain (熊本平野), it was traditionally eaten as a snack during the sweet potato harvest season. It has been continuously handmade in ordinary households and remains an important confectionery for the people of Kumamoto Prefecture.

Today, Ikinari Dango is sold not only in Kumamoto but throughout Kyushu, and can even be found in supermarkets in places like Fukuoka Prefecture.

In recent years, advancements in preservation technology have led to the availability of vacuum-packed and frozen versions. Although it is traditionally enjoyed fresh, variations such as hiyashi ikinari dango (冷やしいきなり団子), which are eaten semi-frozen, have also become popular.

== Name ==
"Ikinari" (いきなり) in the Kumamoto dialect means "simple," "quick," or "immediate." The name is said to derive from the fact that the confection can be made easily and quickly, making it suitable for serving to unexpected guests. Another interpretation is that the term reflects the simple preparation method of wrapping raw sweet potato (サツマイモ) directly in dough and steaming it, emphasizing its ease of making.

An alternative theory suggests that in some areas of Kumamoto, people who are poor at tidying up are still referred to as "ikinari na hito" (いきなりな人). From this usage, "ikinari" came to mean "rough" or "haphazard," implying that the dango is made in a quick and rough manner.
