= Siebold University of Nagasaki =

Coordinates: 32°48′30″N 129°52′31″E

Siebold University of Nagasaki (県立長崎シーボルト大学, Kenritsu Nagasaki Shīboruto Daigaku) was a public university in the town of Nagayo in Nagasaki Prefecture, Japan. Established in 1999, the school merged with Nagasaki Prefectural University to form University of Nagasaki in 2008.
