= University of Nagasaki =

Public university in Sasebo, Nagasaki, Japan

Coordinates: 33.185889°N 129.666778°E

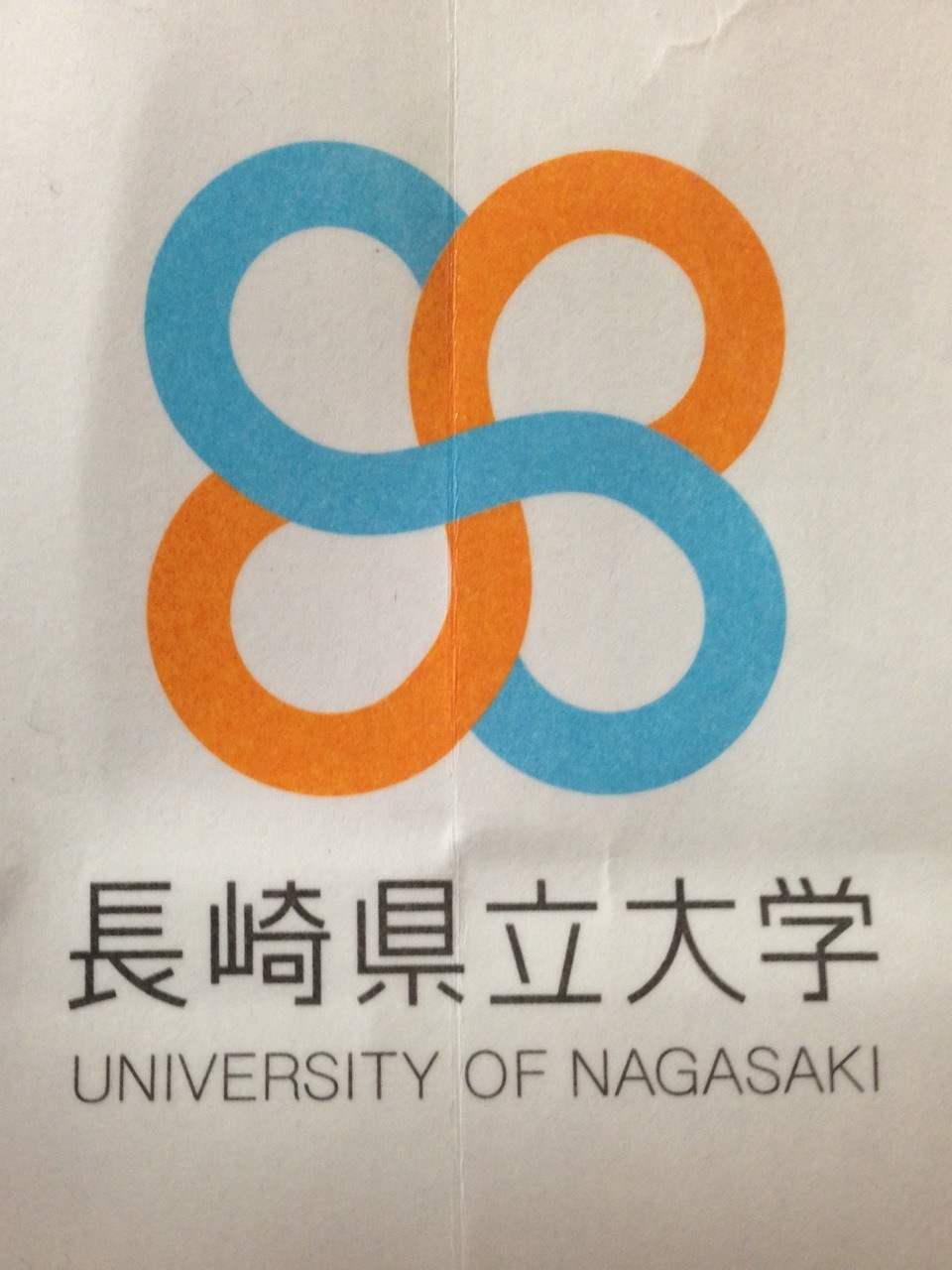
Logo of University

University of Nagasaki (長崎県立大学, Nagasaki kenritsu daigaku; Nagasaki Prefectural University) is a public university in Sasebo, Nagasaki, Japan. The school was established in 2008 as a result of merger of Siebold University of Nagasaki and Nagasaki Prefectural University (it had the same Japanese name as the current university).
