= Nagasaki Prefectural University =

Public university in Sasebo, Nagasaki, Japan

Coordinates: 33.185889°N 129.666778°E

Nagasaki Prefectural University (長崎県立大学, Nagasaki kenritsu daigaku)

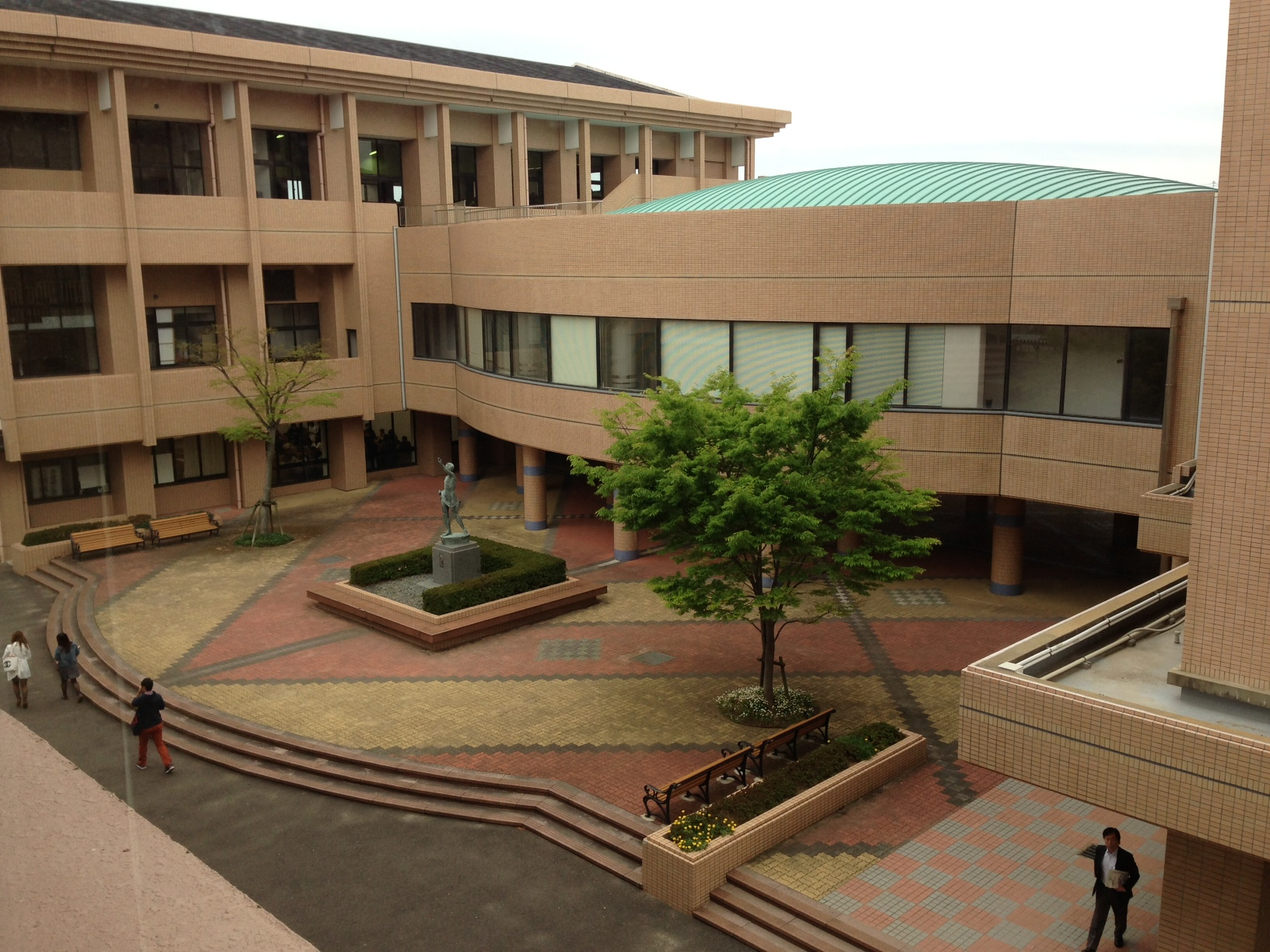
Nagasaki Prefectural University, Sasebo Campus

was a public university in Sasebo, Nagasaki, Japan. The predecessor of the school, a women's school, was established in 1947. In 2008, the school merged with Siebold University of Nagasaki to form the University of Nagasaki.
