= Kurume Kasuri =

Japanese textile produced in Kurume City

Kurume kasuri (久留米絣) is a traditional Japanese kasuri textile produced in Kurume City and its surrounding areas in Fukuoka Prefecture, formerly part of the Kurume Domain. It is a cotton-based fabric primarily dyed with indigo, characterized by patterns created through the use of pre-dyed threads, alternating between indigo and white.

Kurume kasuri is considered one of the three major kasuri textiles in Japan, along with Iyo kasuri and Bingo kasuri. The technique was designated as an Important Intangible Cultural Property in 1956, and recognized as a Traditional Craft by the Ministry of International Trade and Industry in 1976.

== Explanation ==
Unlike kasuri techniques that originated from the south via the Ryukyu Islands, Kurume kasuri is believed to have been developed independently in the late Edo period by Inoue Den, a 12-year-old girl at the time. The Kurume Domain encouraged its production as a local industry. At its peak, annual production reached between 2 and 3 million bolts. However, demand significantly declined after World War II due to the rise of Western-style clothing. Today, production continues on a smaller scale, with recent efforts focusing on the development of new products such as sneakers and bags incorporating Kurume kasuri.

A related cultural tradition is the Kurume Soroban Odori ("Kurume Abacus Dance"). This dance is said to have originated during the Meiji period, when merchants from across Japan, visiting the region to purchase kasuri, heard local girls—who worked as weavers—singing labor songs. These merchants later enjoyed the songs in inns with geisha, using their abacuses to mimic the rhythmic sounds of weaving, thus giving rise to the dance.

== Trivia ==
- Japanese novelist Osamu Dazai was known to favor wearing kimonos made from Kurume kasuri.
