= Miyazaki Municipal University =

Coordinates: 31°55′33″N 131°25′06″E

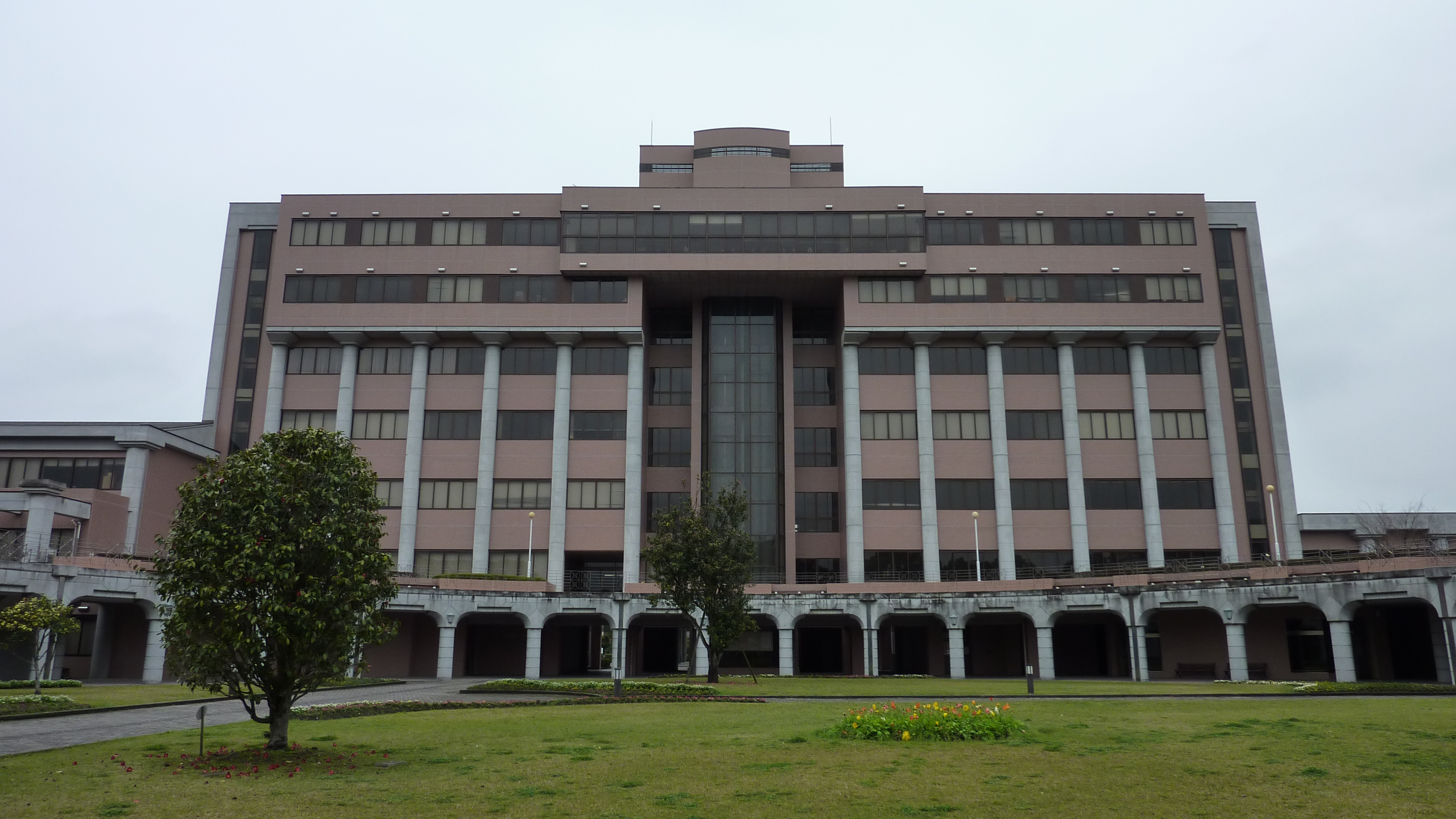
Miyazaki Municipal University

Miyazaki Municipal University (宮崎公立大学, Miyazaki kōritsu daigaku; Miyazaki Public University) is a public university in Miyazaki, Miyazaki, Japan, established in 1993.
