= Umegae mochi =

Rice cake confection from Fukuoka, Japan

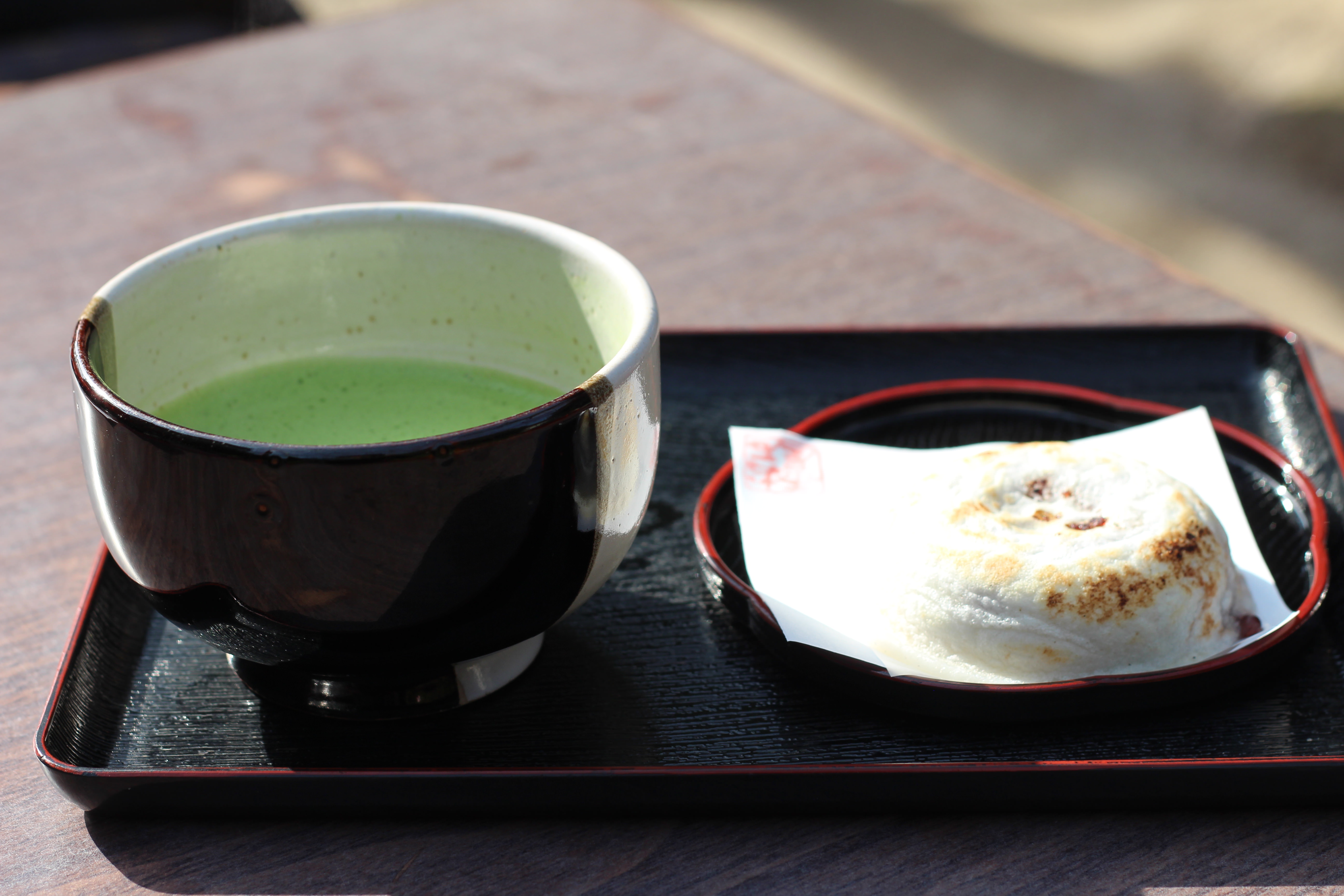
Umegae mochi and matcha

Umegae mochi (Japanese: 梅ヶ枝餅) is a type of traditional rice cake confection originating from Dazaifu in Fukuoka Prefecture, Japan.

== Description ==
Umegae mochi is a grilled rice cake filled with sweet red bean paste, made by wrapping the paste in a thin layer of mochi dough and baking it on a hot iron plate stamped with a plum blossom design. When finished, a faint plum blossom mark appears at the center of the rice cake.

Despite its name, Umegae mochi does not have the flavor or fragrance of plum; rather, its name is derived from a legend associated with Sugawara no Michizane, the deity enshrined at Dazaifu Tenmangū.

In terms of confectionery classification, it is considered a "grilled sweet" (焼き菓子) rather than a "steamed sweet" like manju.

At Dazaifu Tenmangū, the 25th of each month is celebrated as "Tenjin-sama Day," commemorating Sugawara no Michizane's birth on June 25, 845, and death on March 25, 903. On this day, a special version of Umegae-mochi made with yomogi (Japanese mugwort) and colored green is sold.

Additionally, from November 17, 2015, Umegae-mochi made with ancient rice, giving it a purplish hue, has also been sold. This version was initially introduced as a limited product to celebrate the 10th anniversary of the Kyushu National Museum, but it became a regular offering due to its popularity.

Umegae-mochi is sold at tea houses, souvenir shops, and specialty stores along the approach from Nishitetsu Dazaifu Station to Dazaifu Tenmangū. It is also available at festivals, tourist sites, train stations, and airports throughout Fukuoka Prefecture.

There are similar rice cakes made using the same production method but sold under different names at other famous shrines in Fukuoka Prefecture, such as "Matsugae-mochi" (松ヶ枝餅) at Hakozaki Shrine, Miyajidake Shrine, and Munakata Taisha, and "Ebisu-mochi" (恵比寿餅) at Tōka Ebisu Shrine during its New Year's festival.

Although they share the same manufacturing process, they differ slightly—for example, yomogi-flavored mochi is regularly sold alongside them—and they are not directly related to Umegae mochi.

== History ==
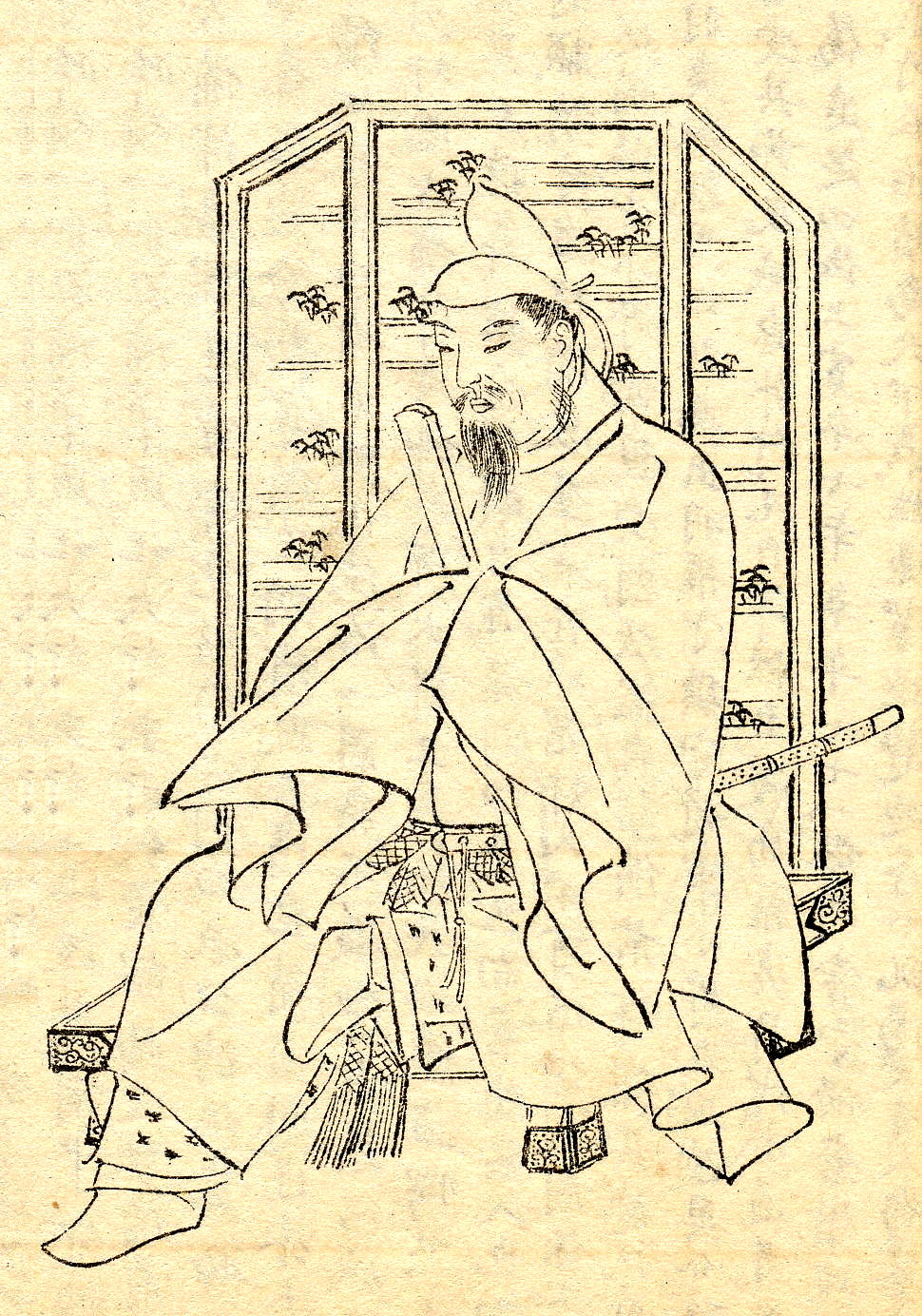
Sugawara no Michizane

In ancient times, when Sugawara no Michizane was demoted from the Heian-kyō (Today part of Kyoto) to Dazaifu and lived there in sorrow, an old woman selling rice cakes in front of Anrakuji Temple offered him a rice cake to lift his spirits. It is said that this rice cake became one of Michizane's favorite foods.

After Michizane's death, the old woman placed a rice cake with a plum branch on his grave as an offering, which is believed to be the origin of Umegae mochi.

Another theory suggests that when Michizane was placed under house arrest immediately after his demotion, he struggled even to receive meals. According to this account, the old woman, unable to hand the rice cake directly through the bars of Michizane's confinement room, skewered it on a plum branch to pass it to him. This story is also depicted in old picture scrolls.

The exact shop that could be considered the "original" seller of Umegae-mochi is currently unknown, but the sweet itself has a long and significant history.

== How to Eat ==
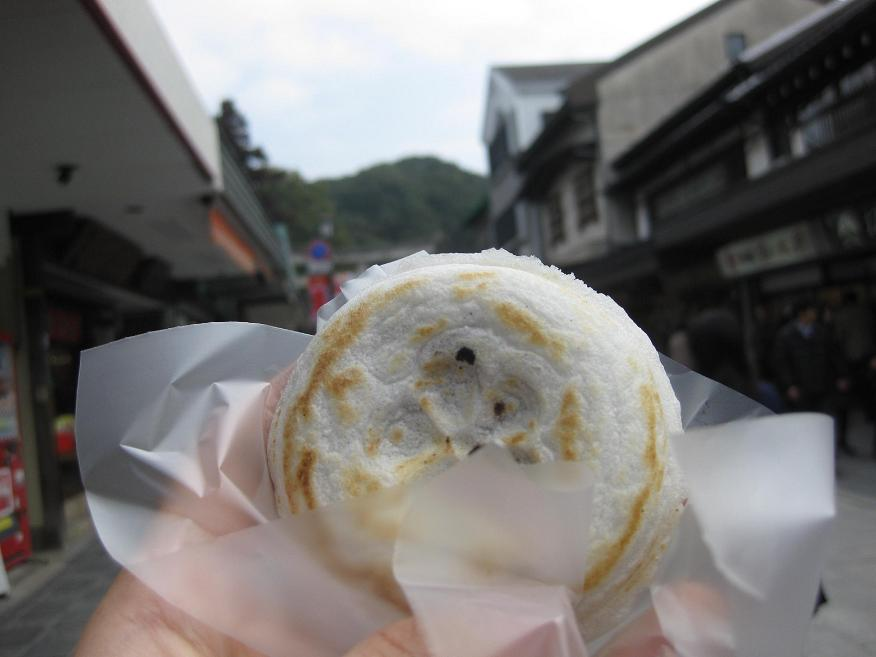
Umegae-mochi for Eating on the Go

When eaten freshly made, Umegae-mochi is typically served with a sheet of paper or plastic, allowing one to enjoy the crisp and fragrant texture by holding it directly in hand.

At shops that have dining areas or cafés, Umegae-mochi is often offered as part of a set menu with matcha (green tea) or plum tea.

If taking it home, the rice cake is first wrapped in a thin plastic sheet to prevent moisture loss before being packaged. As a result, when eaten later, the texture tends to become softer.

To recreate the freshly baked texture at home, it is recommended to heat the Umegae-mochi with the plastic sheet still attached in a microwave for about 20 seconds, then remove the sheet and bake it in a toaster oven for 1–2 minutes to achieve a crispy surface.

For those who prefer a softer texture, heating it in the microwave with the plastic sheet still on for about one minute is ideal.

There is also a "secret menu" where two pieces of Umegae-mochi are used to sandwich an additional layer of sweet red bean paste between them.
