= Southern Kyushu =

Subregion of Kyushu

Southern Kyushu Data
Sum of 3 prefectures
Area	19,139.71km^{2}
General Population	4,174,505 （May 2016）
Pop Density	218.1 per km^{2}

Southern Kyushu (南九州, Minami Kyūshū) is a subregion of the Kyushu region of Japan. This southern region encompasses the prefectures of Kagoshima, Miyazaki, and Okinawa.

It has more of a subtropical climate than the rest of Kyushu.

== See also ==
- List of regions of Japan
- Northern Kyushu
- Prefectures of Japan
- Ryukyu Islands
