= Chukyo =

Chukyo can refer to:

- Emperor Chūkyō (1218-1234), 85th emperor of Japan

the city of Nagoya (中京 Chūkyō). Various things are named after the city:

- Chūkyō Industrial Area
- Chūkyō Metropolitan Area
- Chūkyō Television Broadcasting
- Chukyo University
- Chukyo Racecourse
