= GNI =

GNI or gni may refer to:

- Gross national income, the total domestic and foreign economic output
- Global Network Initiative, an Internet freedom and privacy organization
- Greater Nagoya Initiative, a Japanese business model project
- Graph nonisomorphism problem, a computational problem
- Gooniyandi language (ISO 639-3 code: gni)
- Lüdao Airport, Taitung County, Taiwan (IATA code: GNI)
- Grand Isle Seaplane Base, Louisiana, United States (FAA code: GNI)
