= Greater Nagoya Initiative =

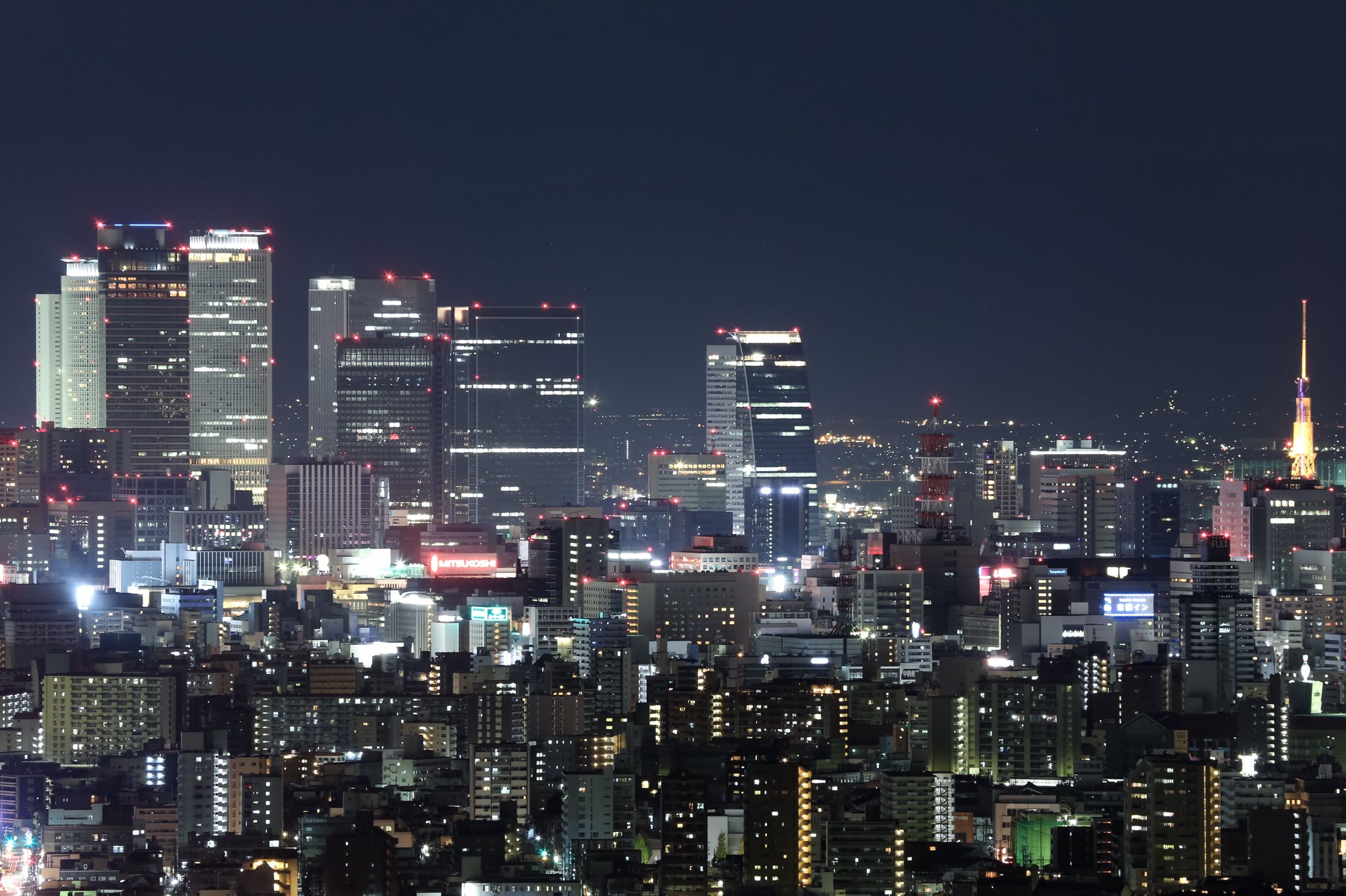
- GNI is co-hosted and operated by Aichi Prefecture, Gifu Prefecture, Mie Prefecture, and several nearby municipalities and business organizations
- Abbreviation: GNI
- Formation: 2004
- Type: Regional revitalization project
- Headquarters: Nagoya, Japan
- Region served: Chūkyō Industrial Area
- Parent organization: Greater Nagoya Initiative Center (GNIC)
- Affiliations: JETRO, METI, local governments, academic institutions
- Website: greaternagoya.org

The Greater Nagoya Initiative (GNI) is a local revitalization project in central Japan established in 2004 to promote the industry and economy of the Chūkyō Industrial Area and to attract foreign companies to invest in the Greater Nagoya region. The initiative is operated by the Greater Nagoya Initiative Center (GNIC), which was established for the purpose in 2006.

GNI is co-hosted and operated by Aichi Prefecture, Gifu Prefecture, Mie Prefecture, and several nearby municipalities and business organizations. It receives additional support from the Japan External Trade Organization (JETRO) and the Ministry of Economy, Trade and Industry (METI). Many of the region's academic institutions and research institutes are members of the GNI and about 530 companies and organizations belong to the GNI Partners Club.
