= Chūkyō metropolitan area =

Metropolitan Area based in Nagoya, Japan

Chūkyō metropolitan area 中京圏
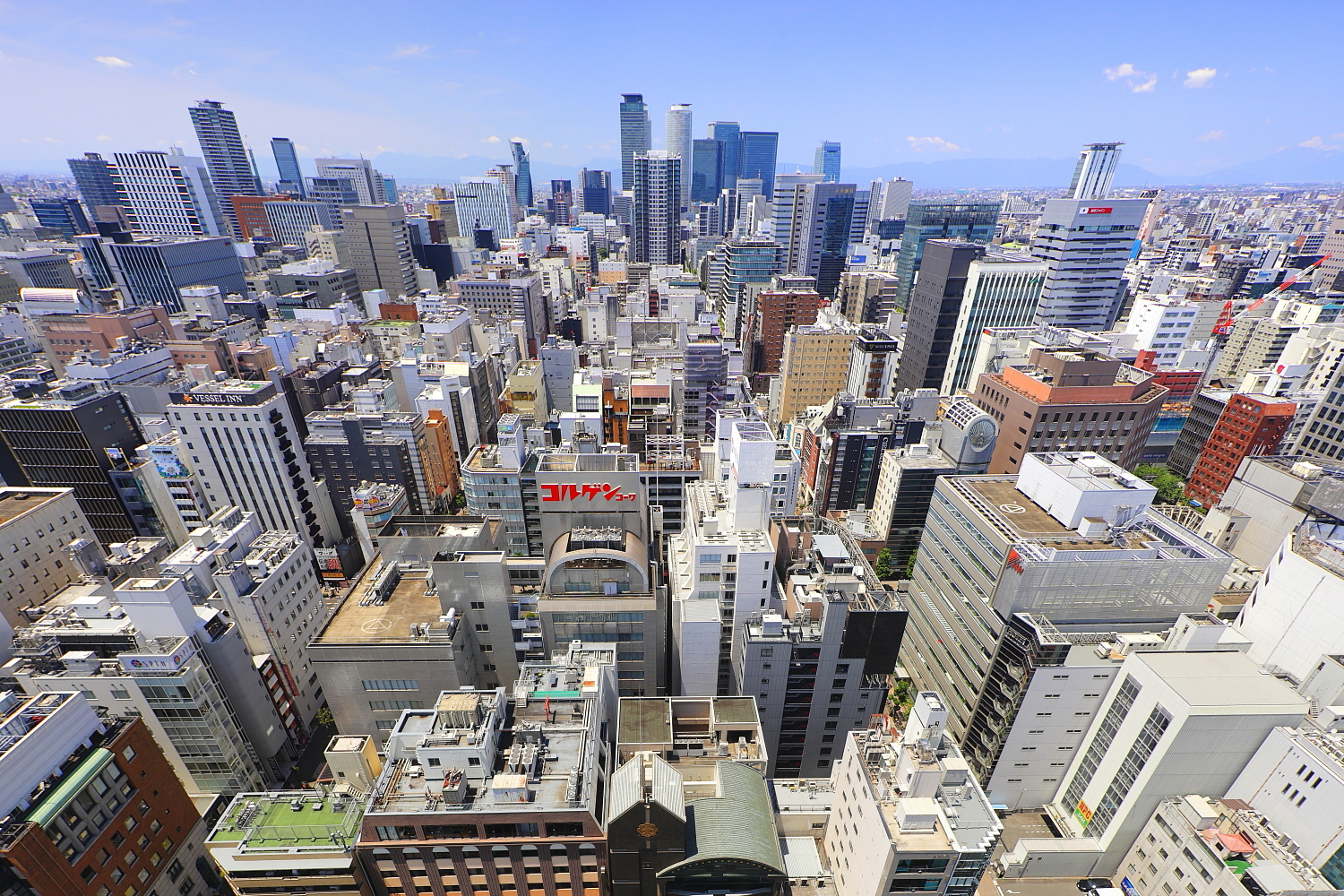
- Nagoya
- Interactive map of Chūkyō metropolitan area
- Country: Japan
- Prefecture: Aichi

Area
  - Metro: 3,704 km^{2} (1,430 sq mi)

Population (Demographia World Urban Areas 2019 ［http://demographia.com/db-worldua.pdf])
  - Metro: 9,439,000
  - Metro density: 2,549/km^{2} (6,600/sq mi)

GDP
  - Metro: JP¥59,799 billion (2022); US$460 billion (2022)

Chūkyō (中京圏, Chūkyō-ken), or the Chūkyō region (中京地方, Chūkyō-chihō), is a major metropolitan area in Japan that is centered on the city of Nagoya (the "Chūkyō", i.e., the "capital in the middle") in Aichi Prefecture. The area makes up the most urbanized part of the Tōkai region. The population is 9,439,000 in 3,704 square kilometers of built-up land area. Nevertheless, like most of Japan's major metro areas, the core of it lies on a fertile alluvial plain, in this case, the Nōbi Plain.

Nagoya metropolitan area Nagoya MEA
- Urban Employment Area
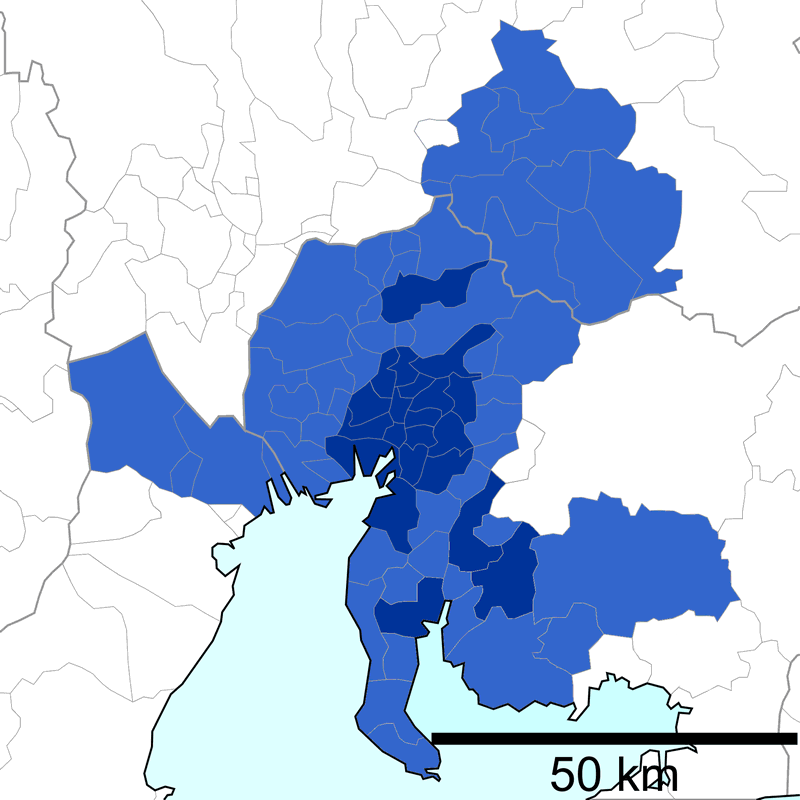
- (2015)
- Interactive map of Nagoya metropolitan area
- Country: Japan
- Prefectures: Gifu Prefecture; Aichi Prefecture; Mie Prefecture
- Core cities: Nagoya; Komaki; Tōkai; Handa; Kariya; Anjō; Others

Area (2011)
  - Total: 2,791.72 km^{2} (1,077.89 sq mi)
  - Inhabitable area: 1,902.02 km^{2} (734.37 sq mi)

Population (2015)
  - Total: 6,871,632
  - Rank: 3rd in Japan
  - Density: 2,461.43/km^{2} (6,375.08/sq mi)

It is among the 50 most populous metropolitan areas in the world, and is the third most populous metropolitan area in Japan (after Greater Tokyo and Osaka-Kobe-Kyoto), containing roughly 7% of Japan's population. Historically, this region has taken a back seat to the other two power centers, both politically and economically; however, the agglomeration of Nagoya is the world's 22nd-largest metro area economy, in terms of gross metropolitan product at purchasing power parity in 2014, according to a study by the Brookings Institution. The GDP of Greater Nagoya, Nagoya Metropolitan Employment Area, was US$256.3 billion in 2010.

Prefecture	Gross prefecture product (in billion JP¥, 2022)	Gross prefecture product (in billion US$, 2022)
Aichi	43,083	332
Mie	8,491	65
Gifu	8,225	63
Chūkyō	59,799	460

== Municipalities ==
The metropolitan area stretches beyond the central city of Nagoya to other municipalities in Aichi Prefecture, as well as neighboring Gifu and Mie prefectures.

=== Aichi Prefecture ===
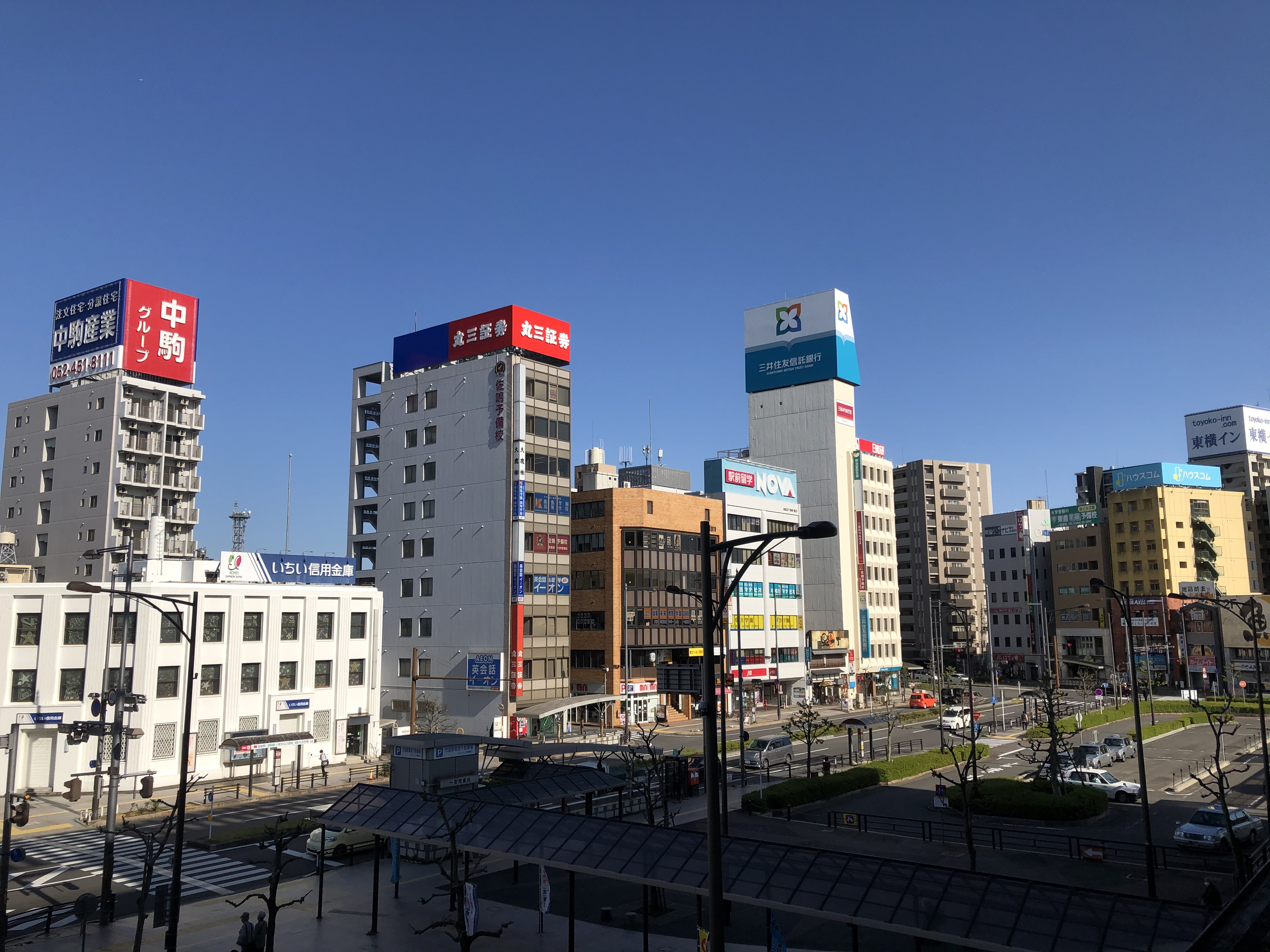
Ichinomiya

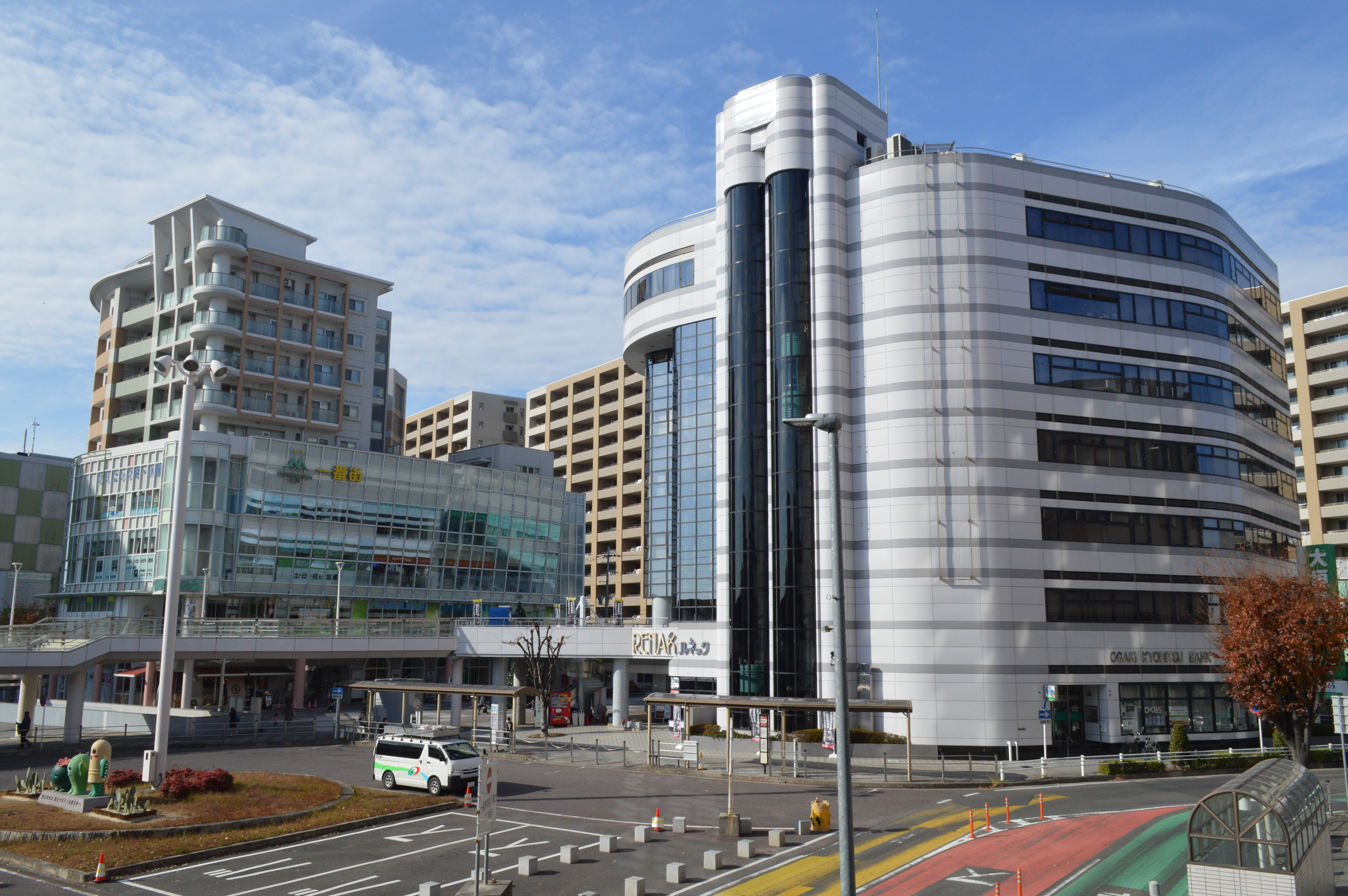
Kasugai

Western Aichi Prefecture（Owari Province）

- Aisai
- Ama
- Chita
- Handa
- Ichinomiya
- Inazawa
- Inuyama
- Iwakura
- Kasugai
- Komaki
- Kitanagoya
- Kiyosu
- Kōnan
- Nagakute
- Nisshin
- Ōbu
- Owariasahi
- Seto
- Tōkai
- Tokoname
- Toyoake
- Tsushima
- Yatomi

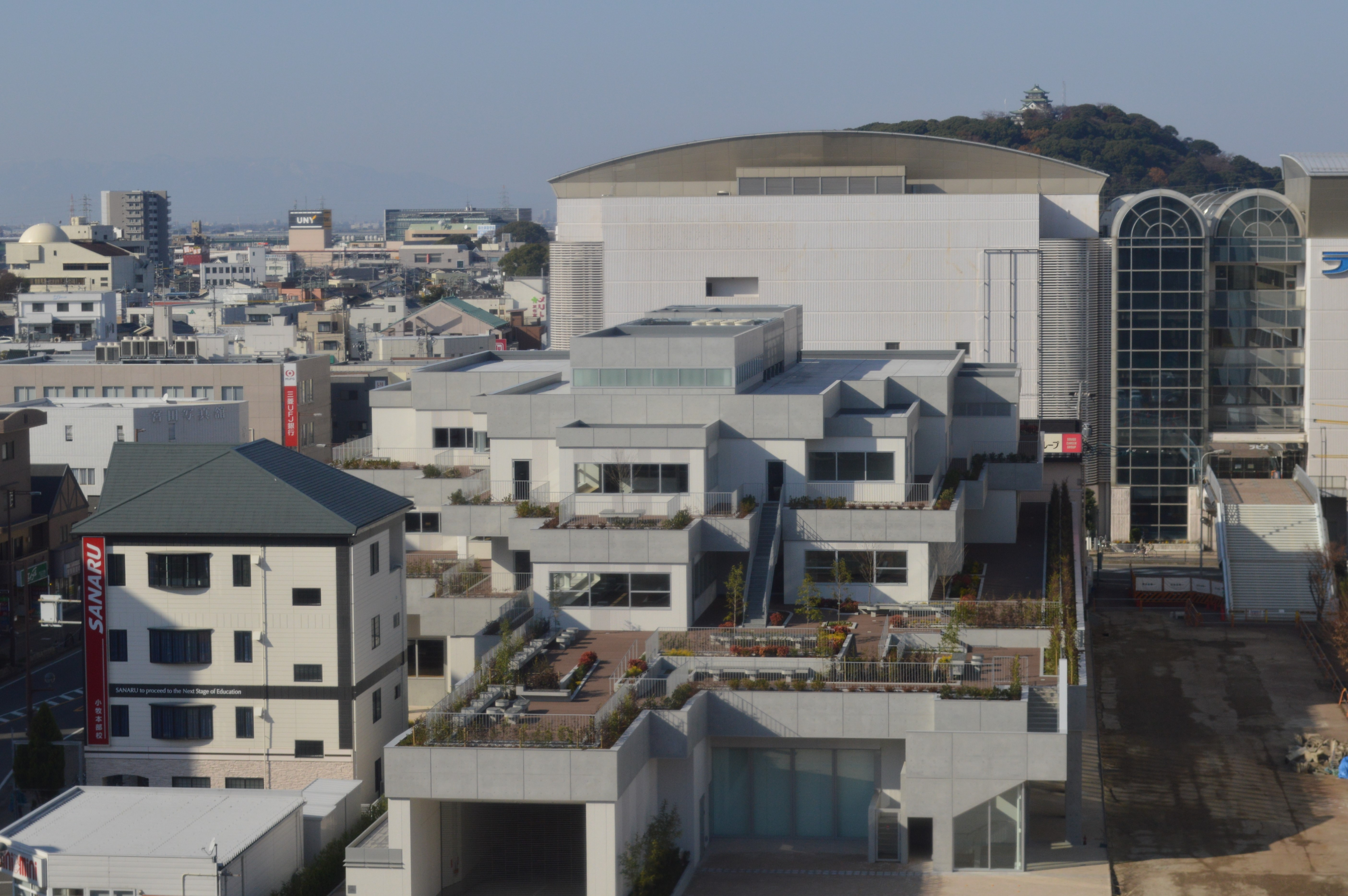
Komaki

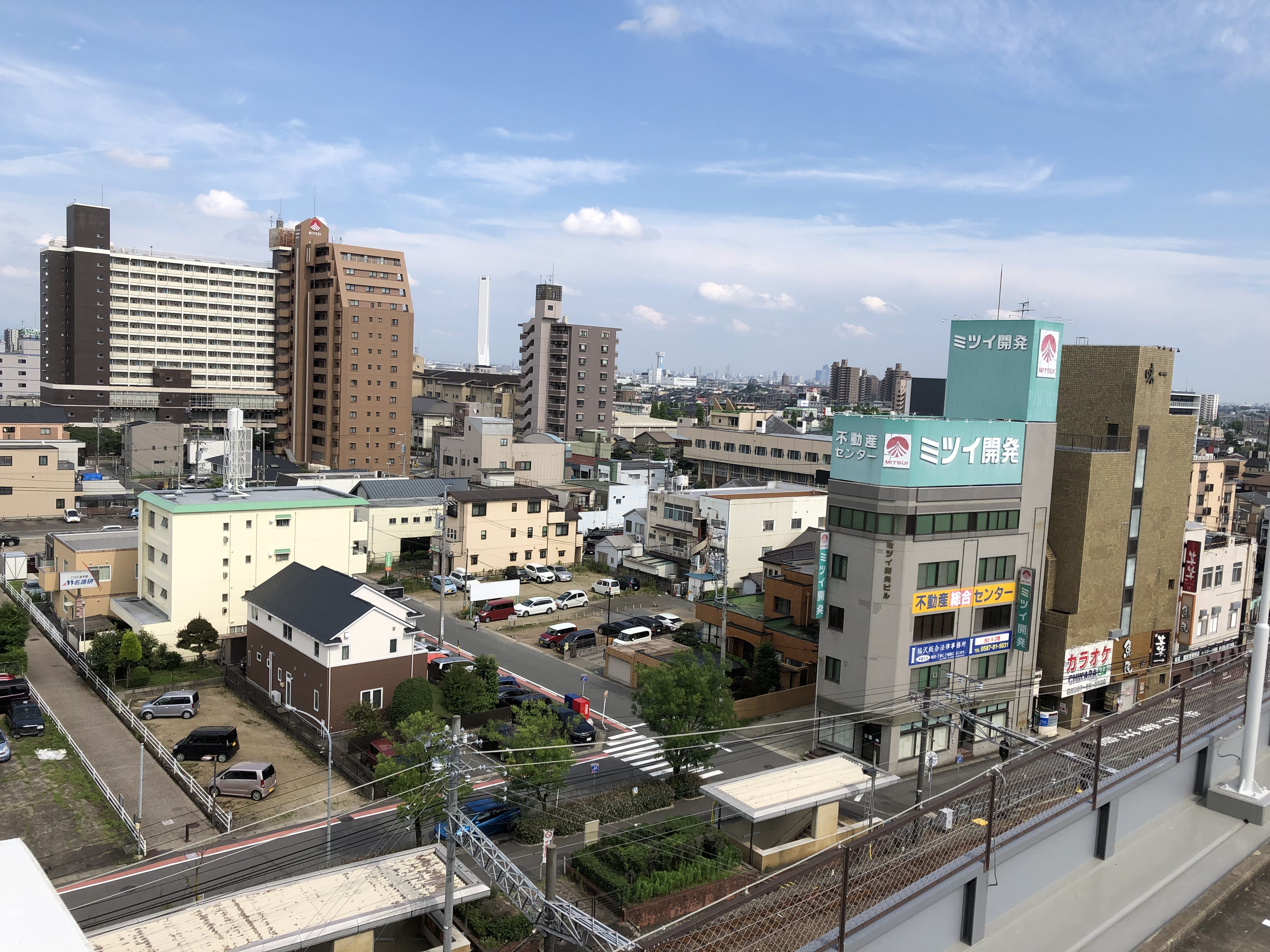
Inazawa

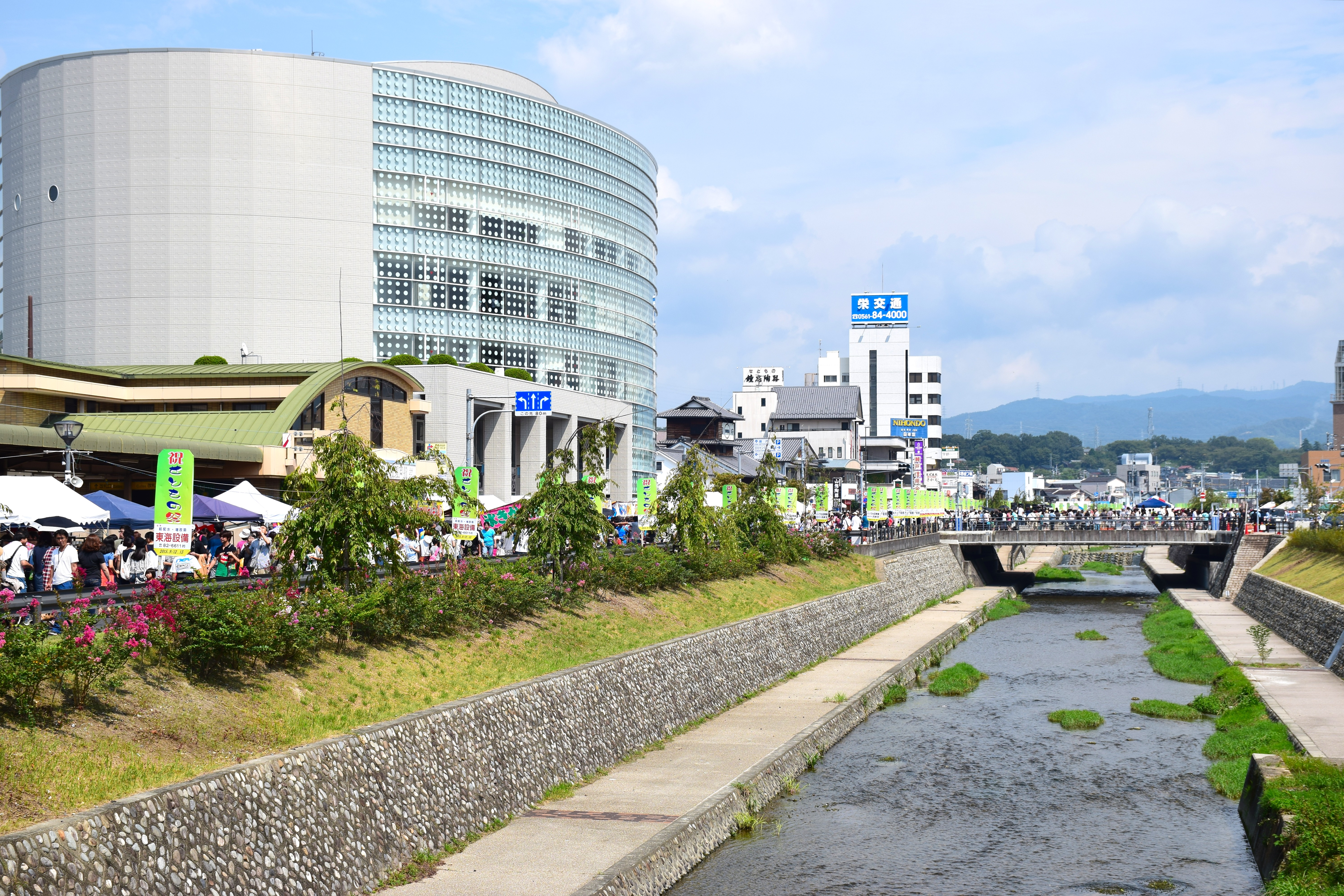
Seto

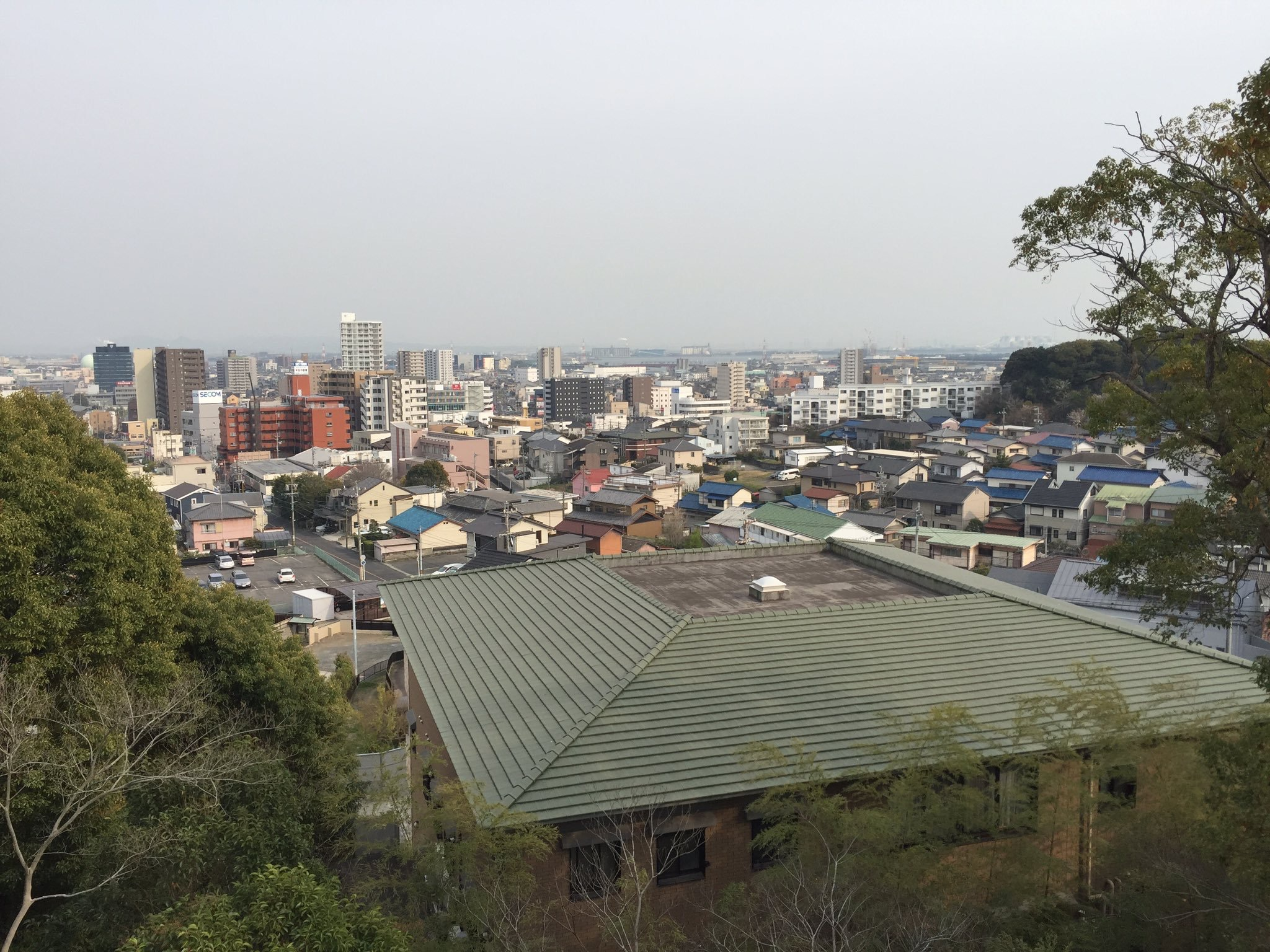
Handa

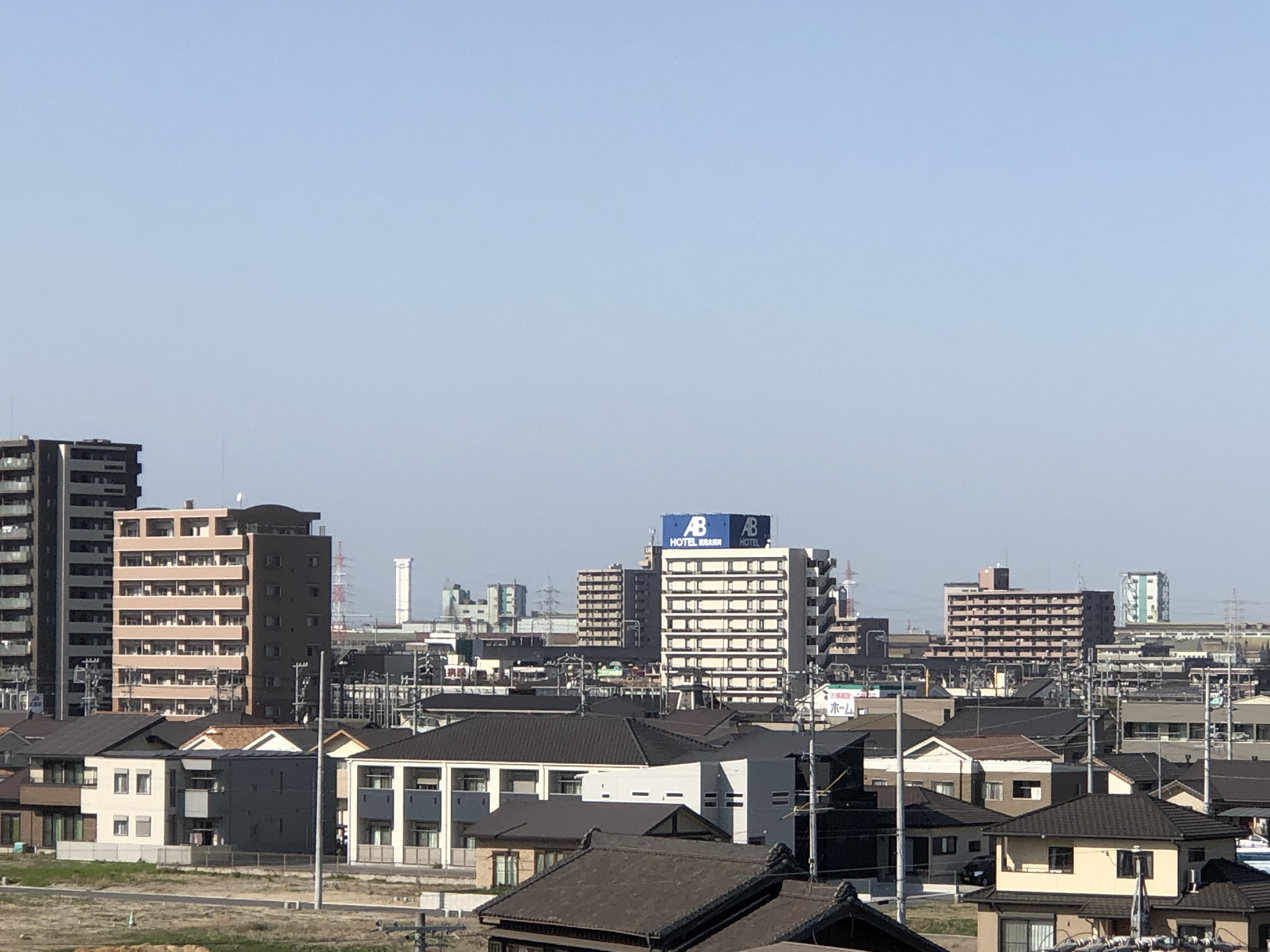
Tōkai

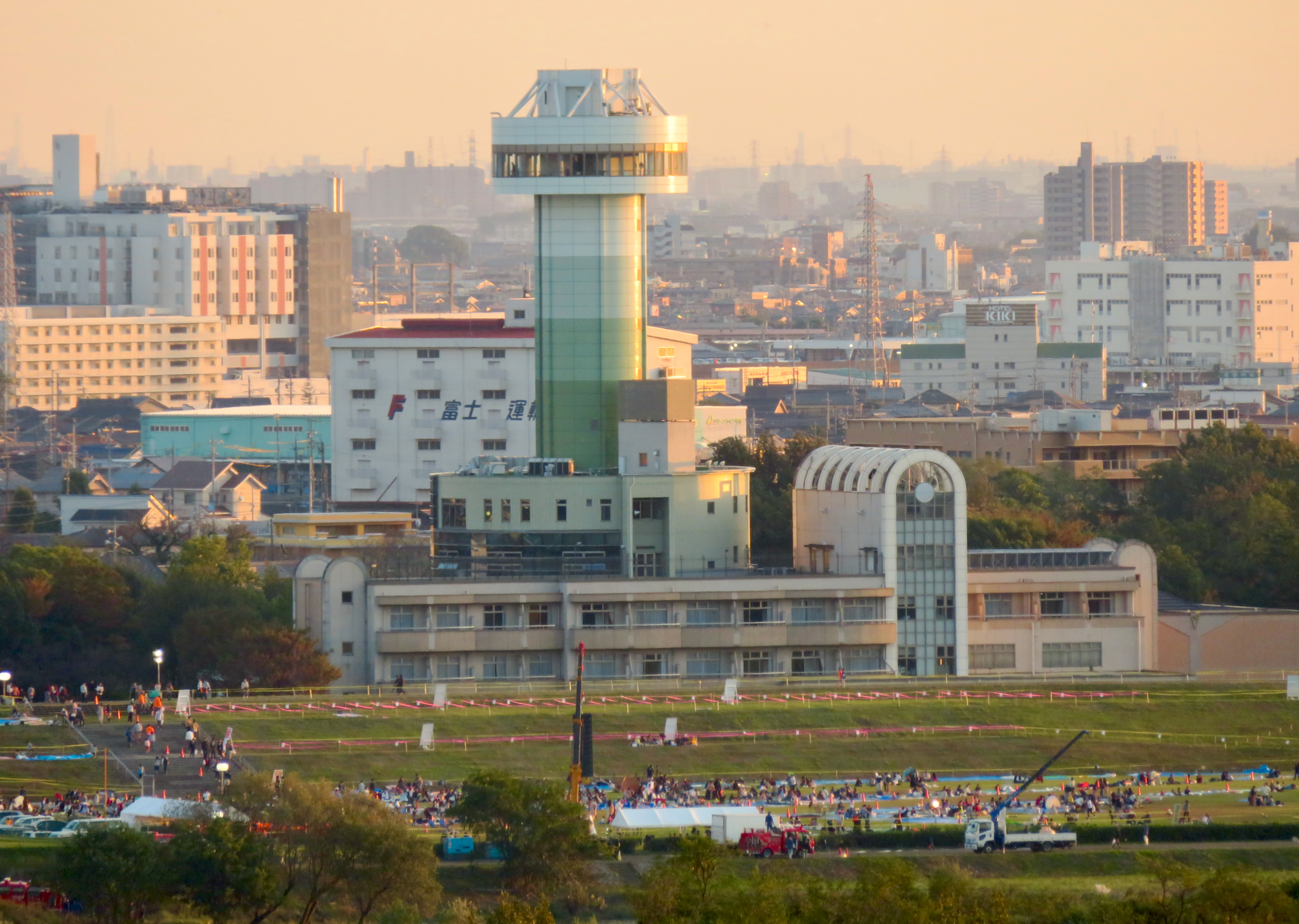
Kōnan

Eastern Aichi Prefecture（Mikawa Province）

Toyohashi MEA

Toyota MEA

Okazaki MEA

- Anjō
- Chiryū
- Gamagori
- Hekinan
- Kariya
- Miyoshi
- Nishio
- Okazaki
- Tahara
- Takahama
- Toyohashi
- Toyokawa
- Toyota

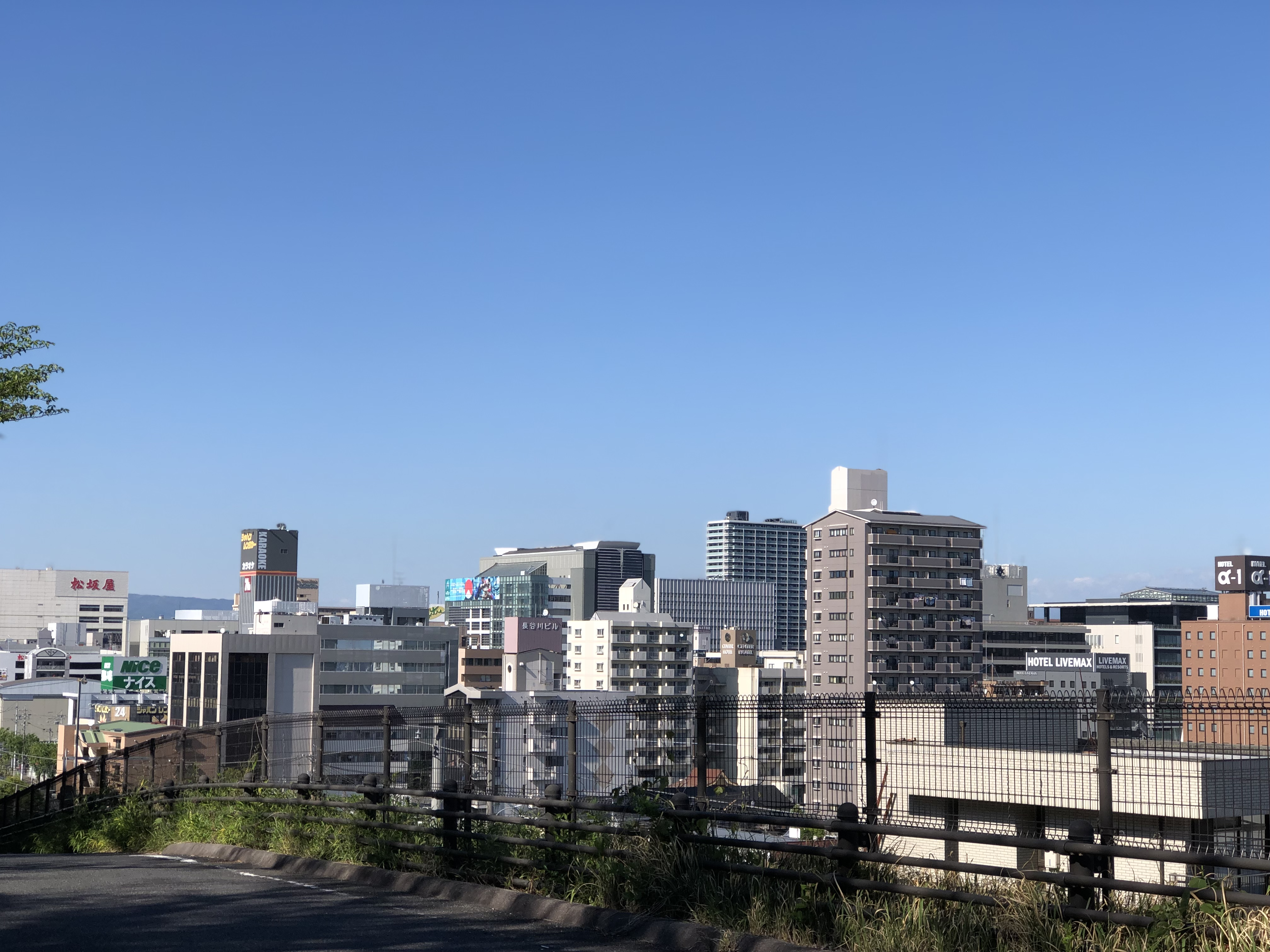
Toyota

Okazaki

Toyohashi

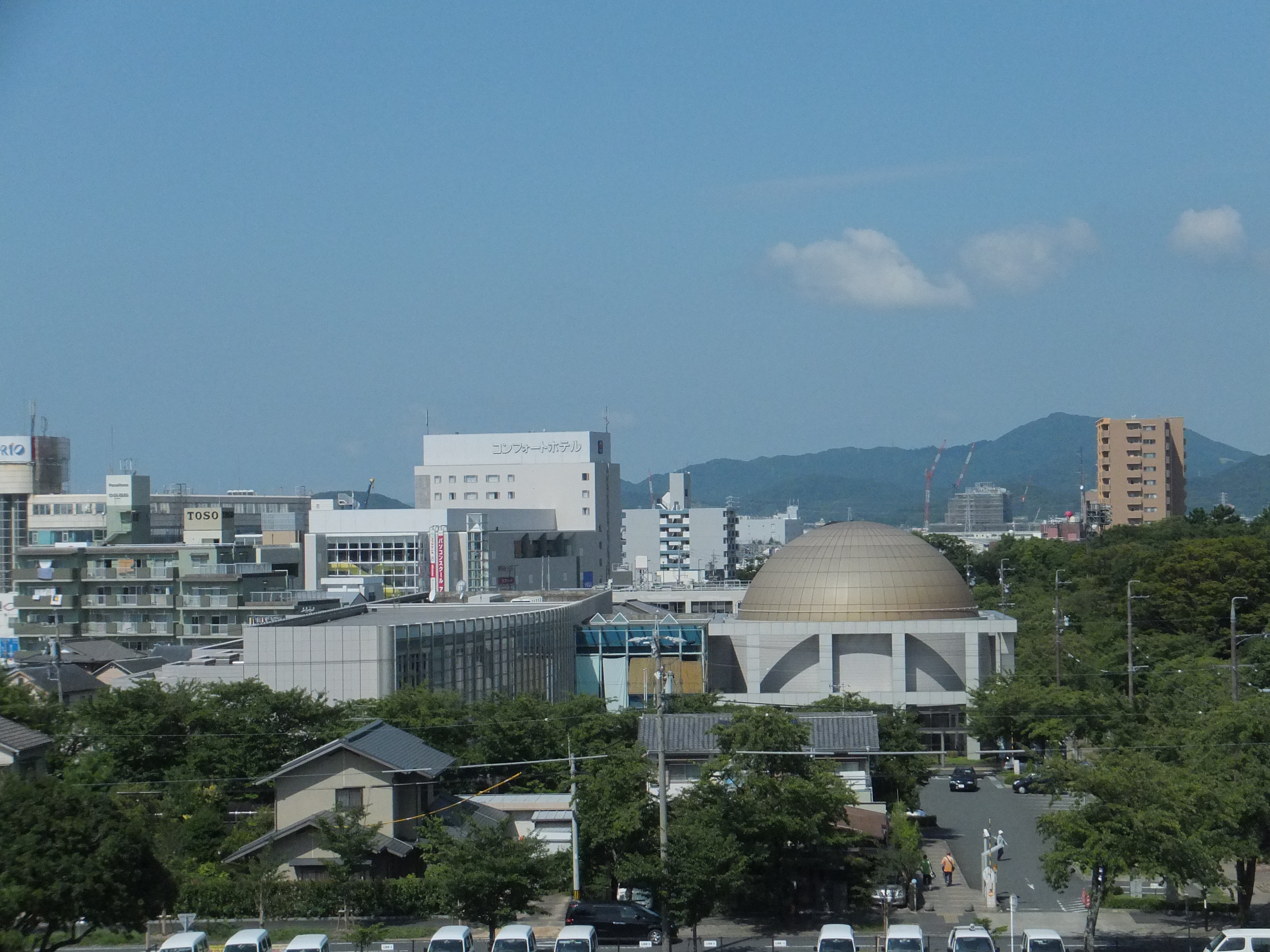
Toyokawa

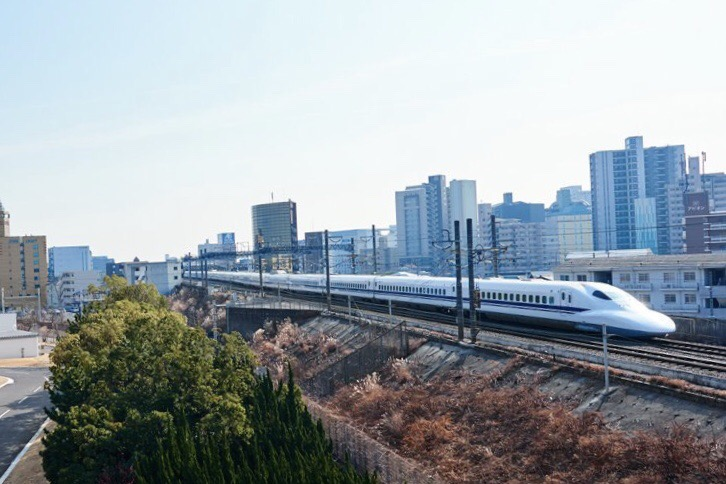
Anjō

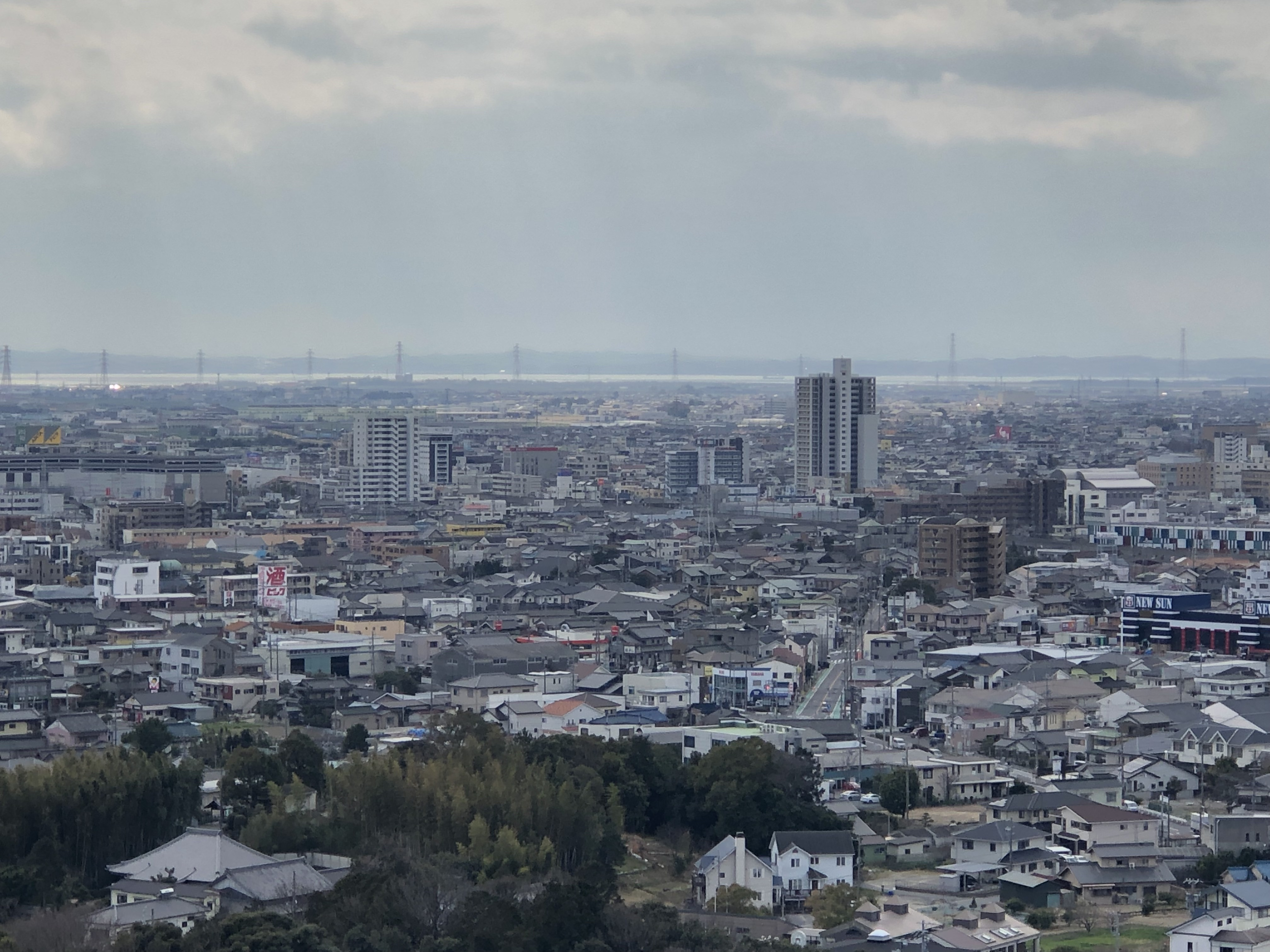
Nishio

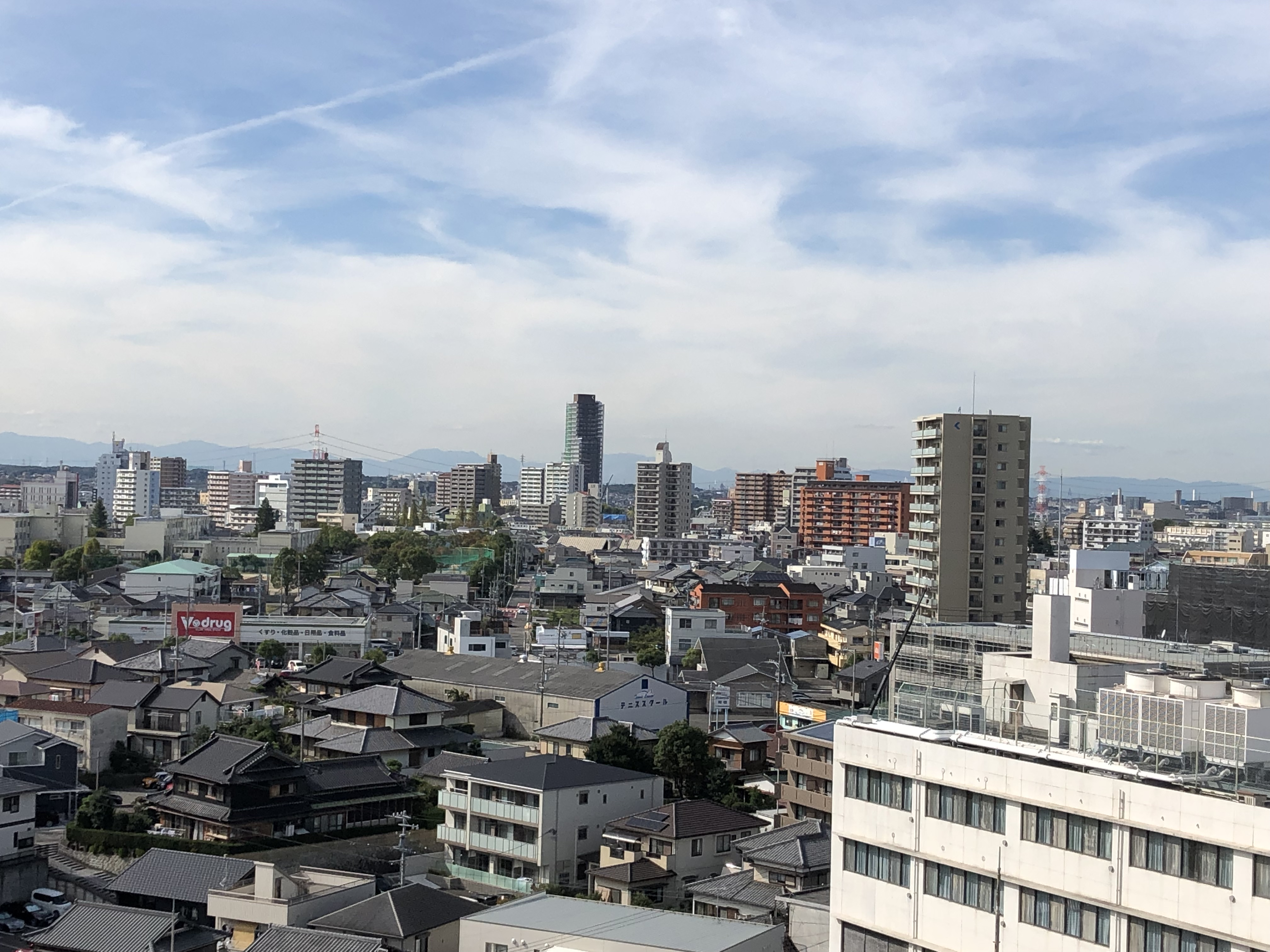
Kariya

=== Gifu Prefecture ===
Gifu MEA

Ogaki MEA

- Ena
- Gifu
- Hashima
- Kaizu
- Kakamigahara
- Kani
- Minokamo
- Mizuho
- Mizunami
- Motosu
- Nakatsugawa
- Ōgaki
- Tajimi
- Toki

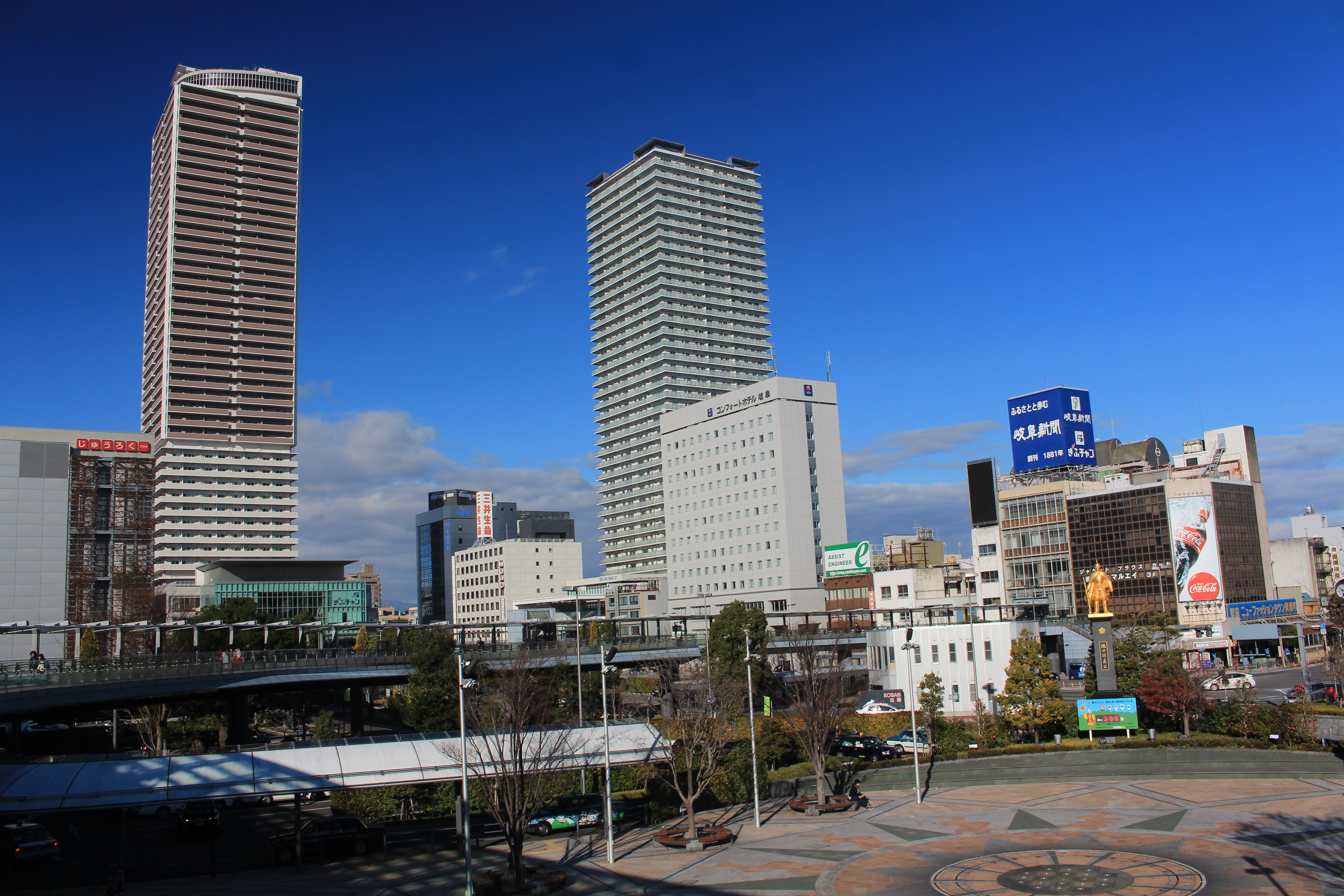
Gifu

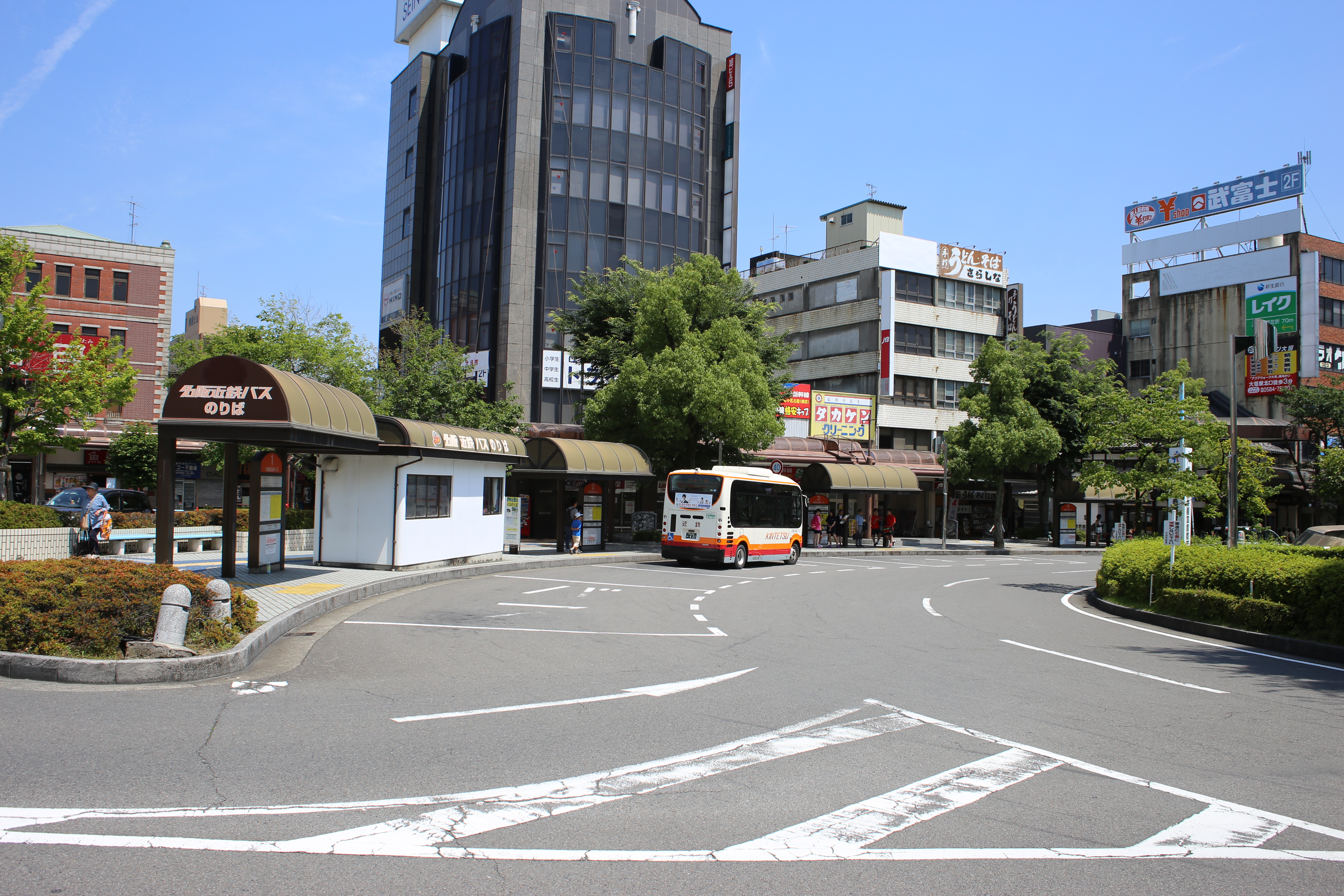
Ōgaki

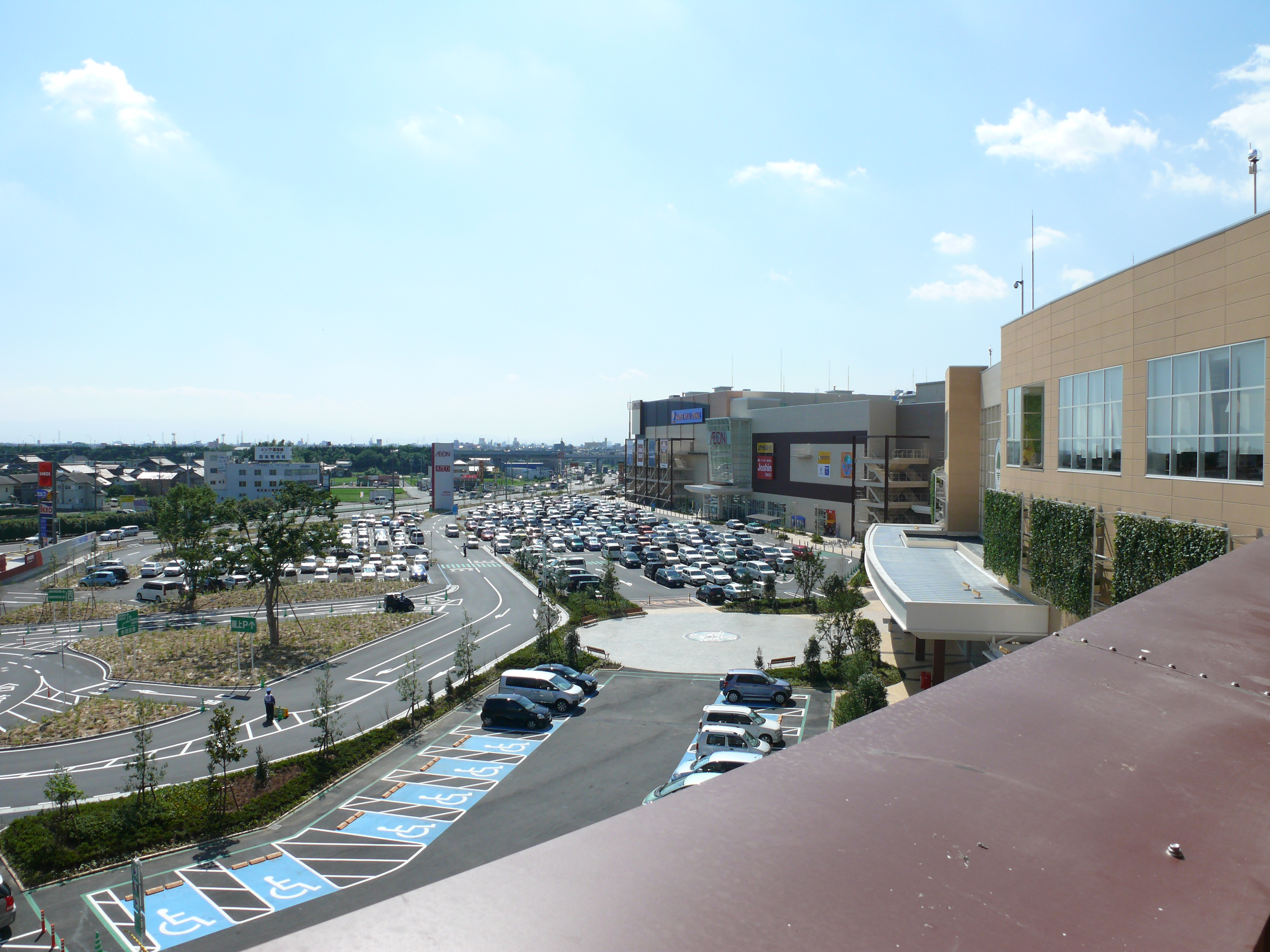
Kakamigahara

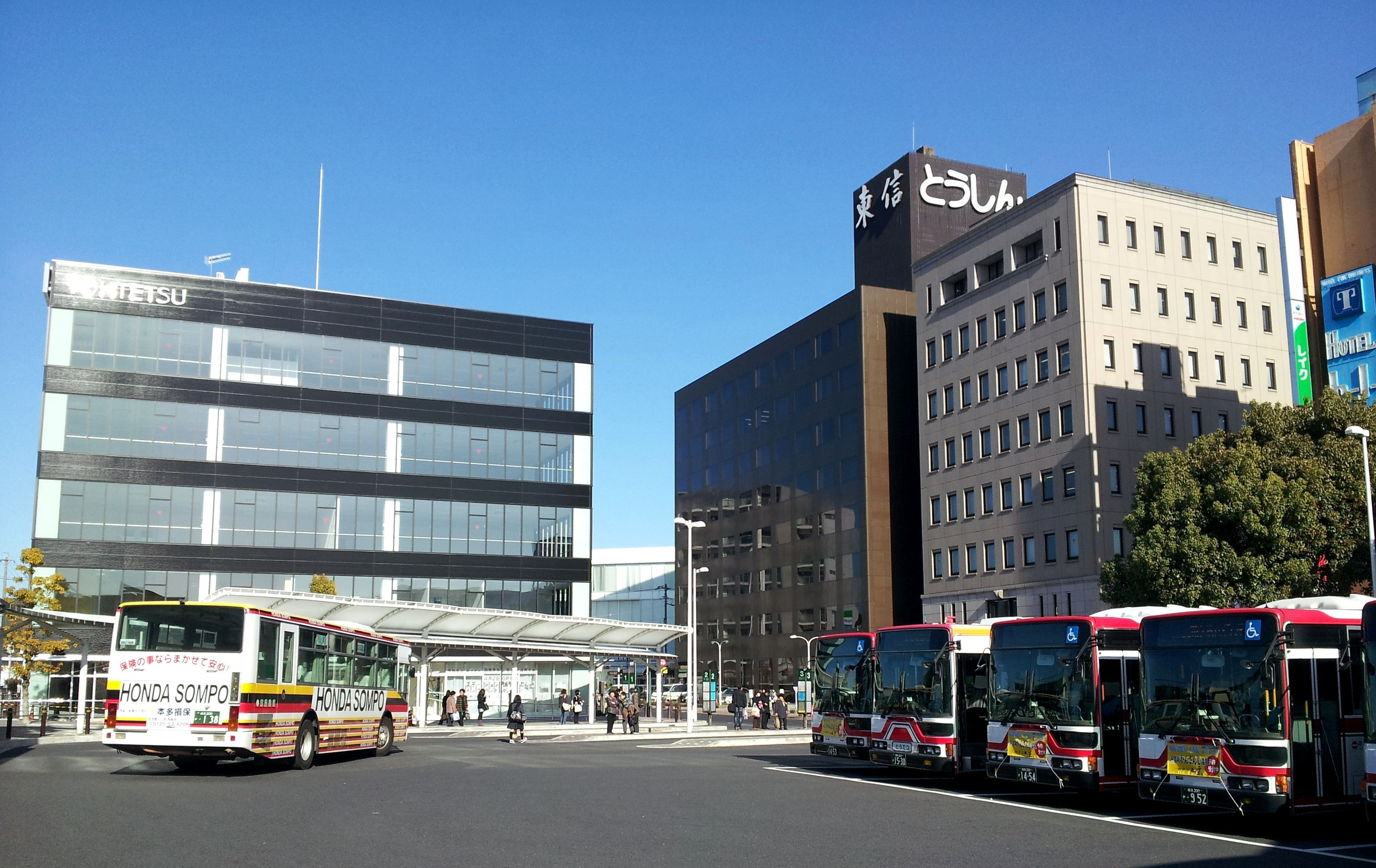
Tajimi

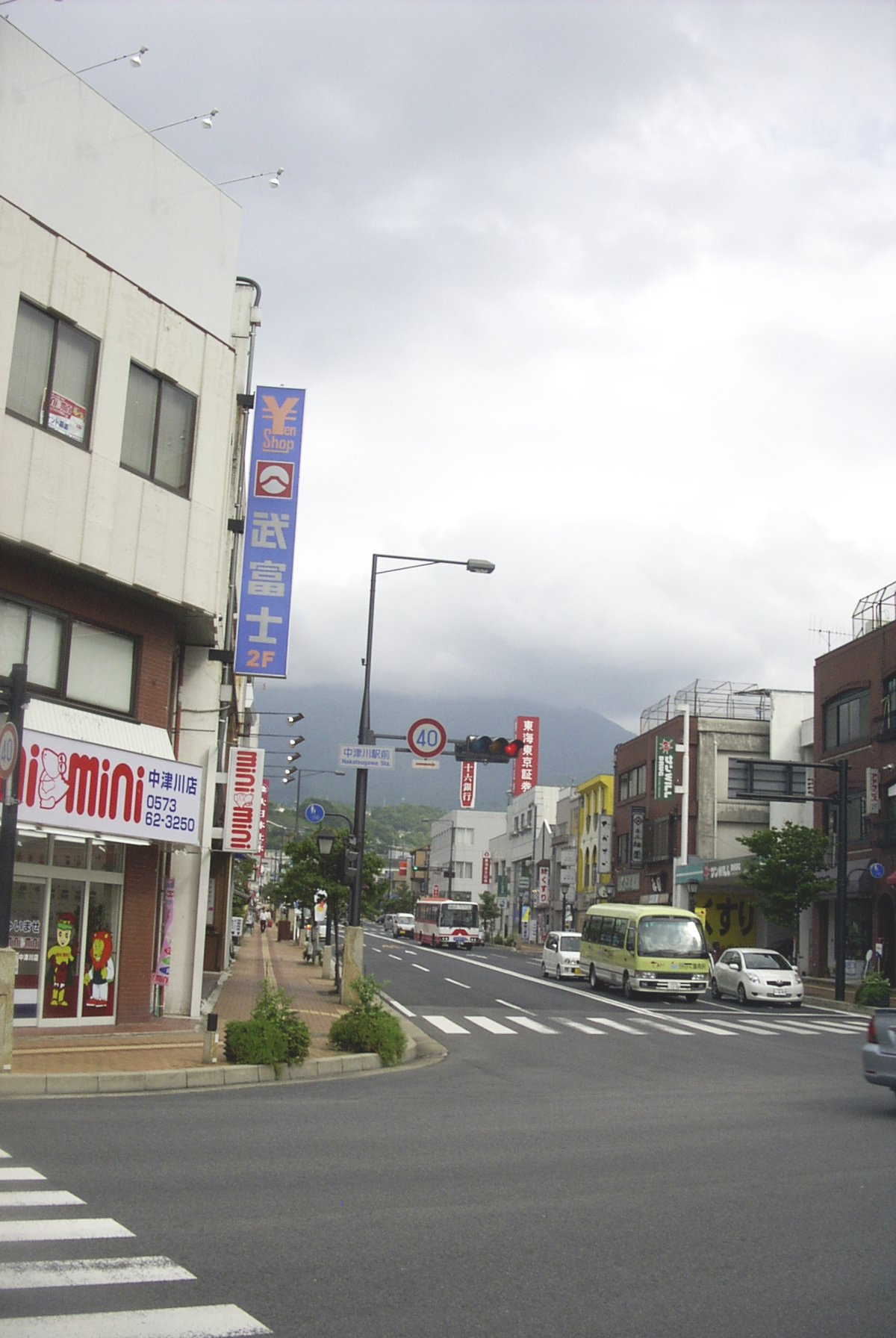
Nakatsugawa

=== Mie Prefecture ===
Yokkaichi MEA

- Inabe
- Kuwana
- Suzuka
- Yokkaichi

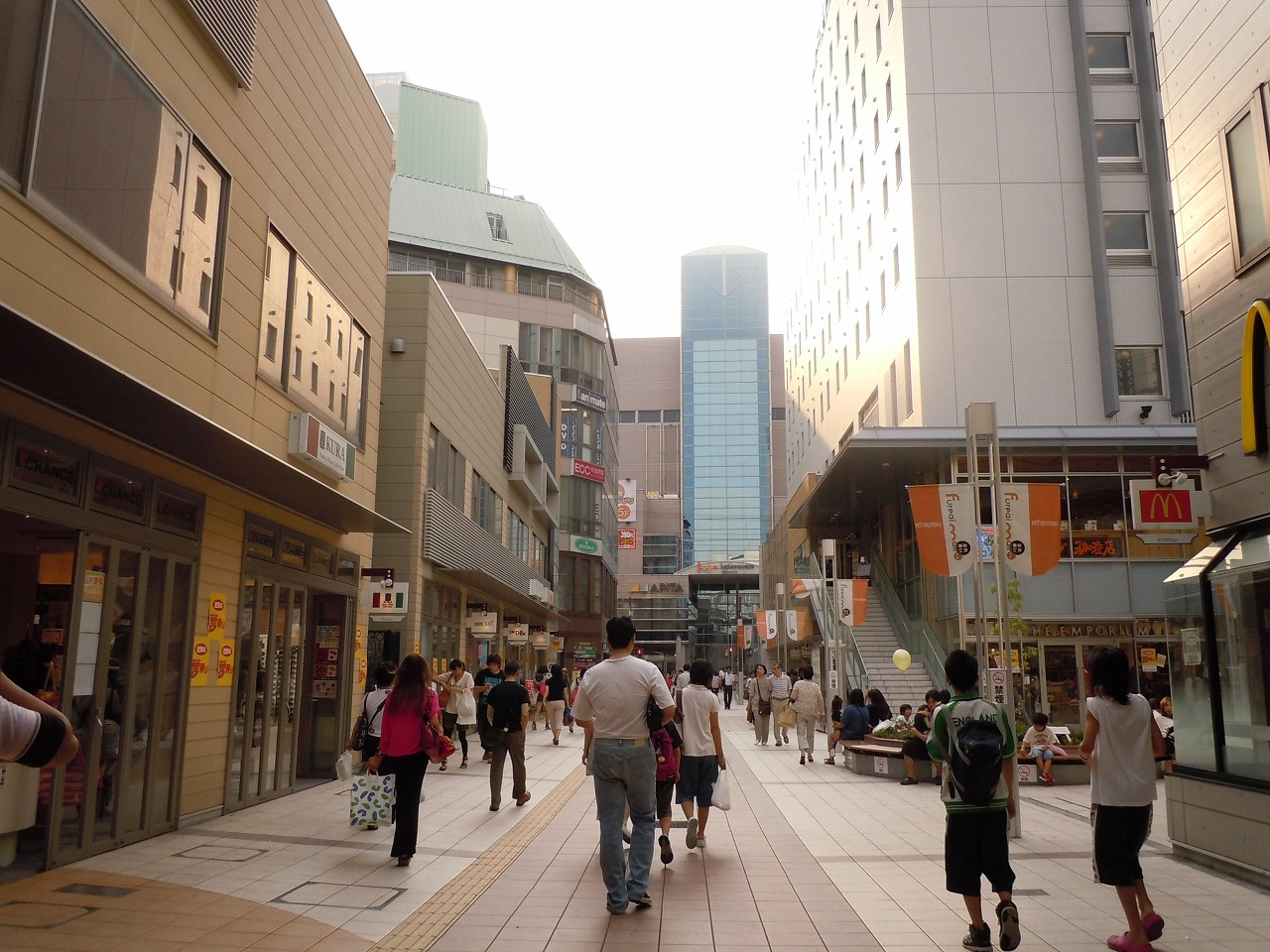
Yokkaichi

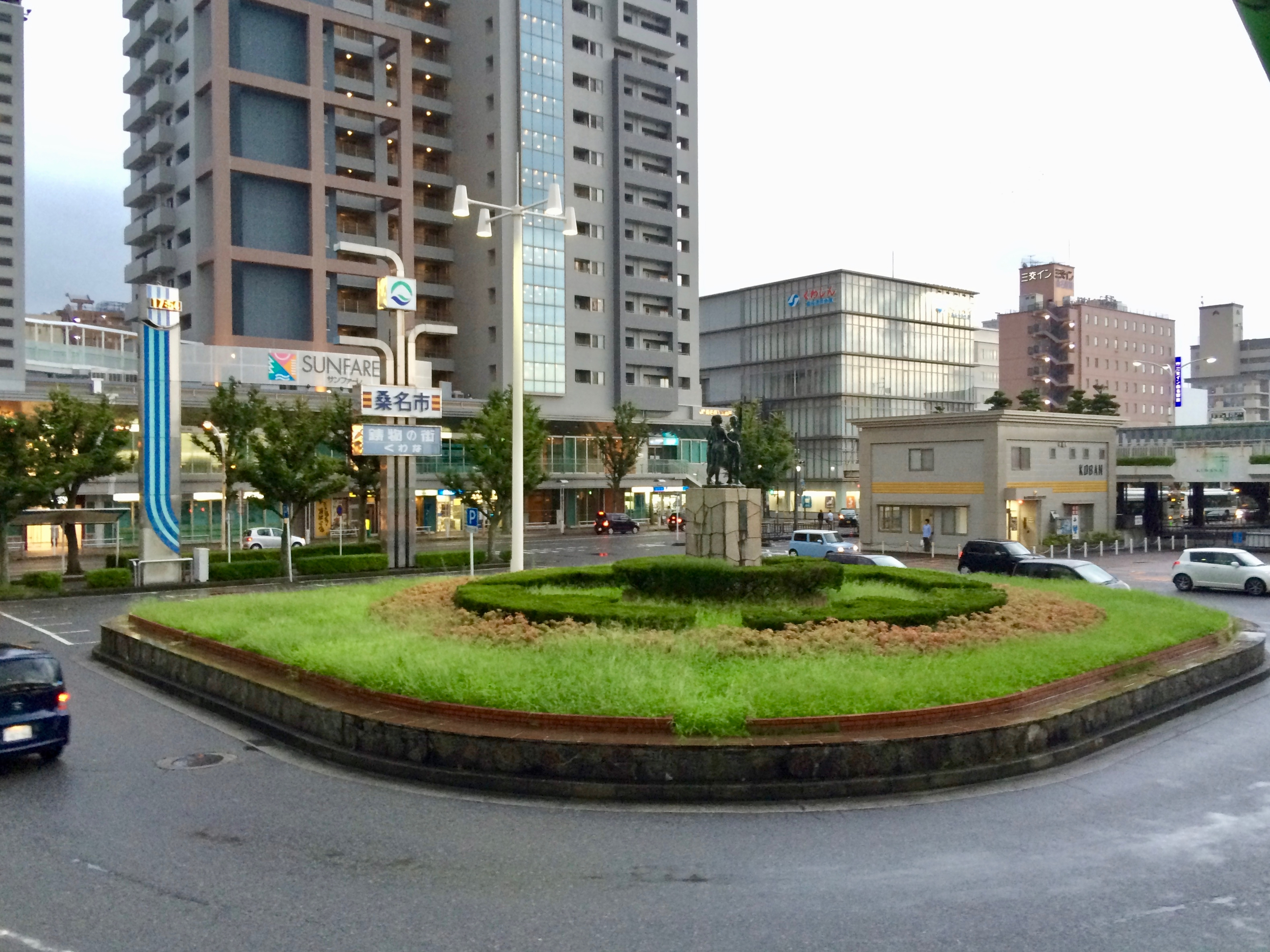
Kuwana

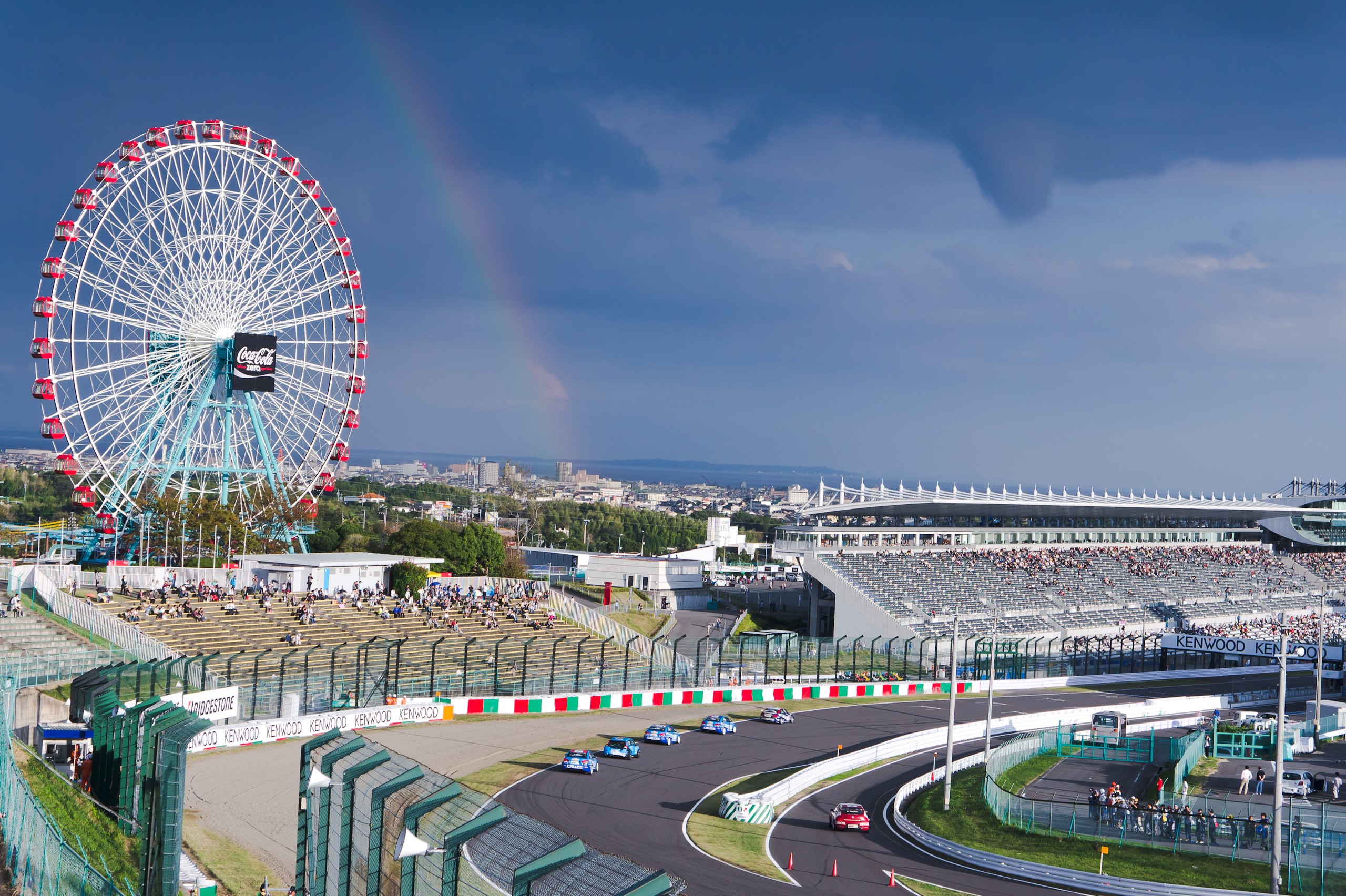
Suzuka

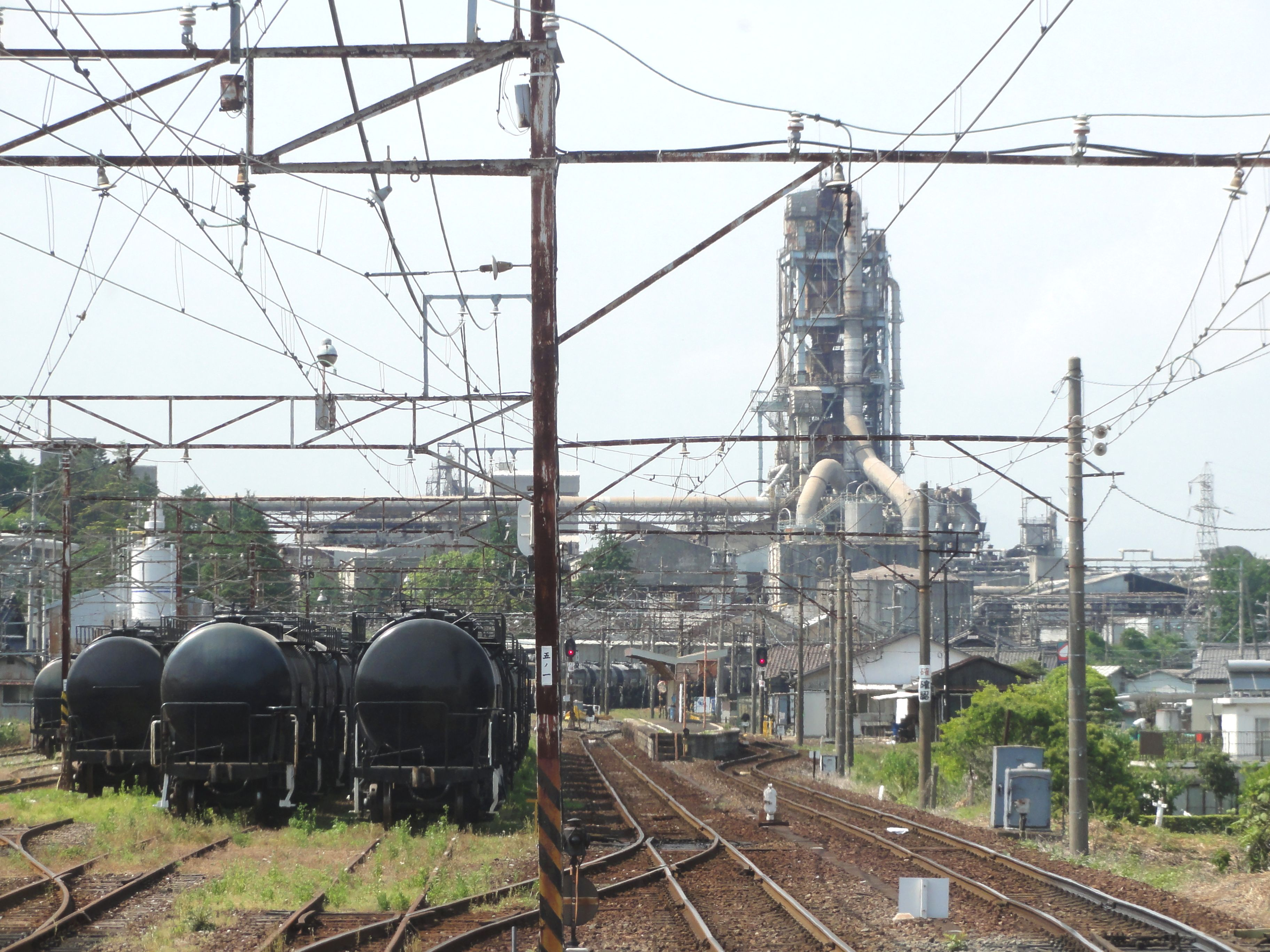
Inabe

== Transport ==
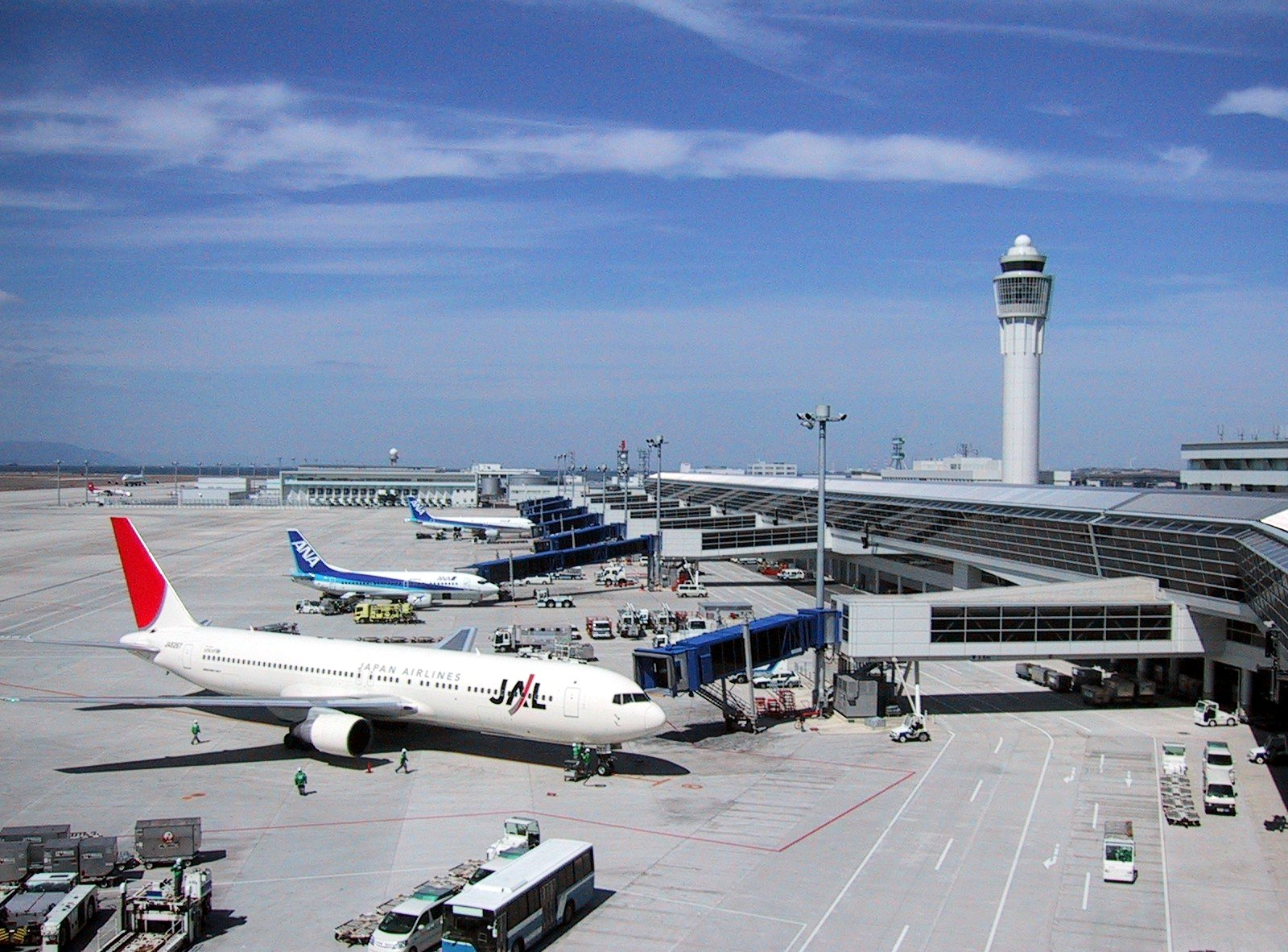
Chūbu Centrair International Airport

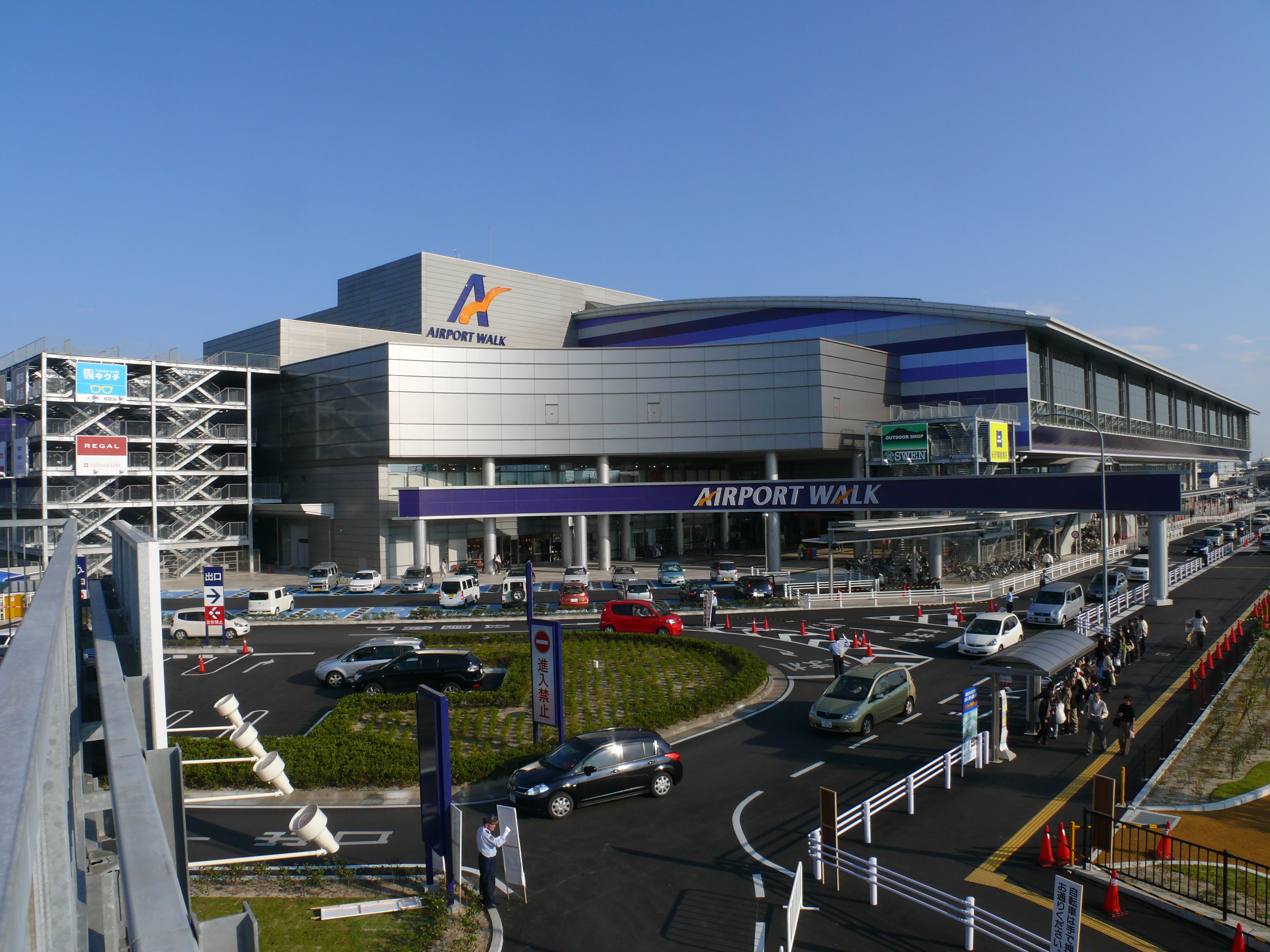
Nagoya Airport

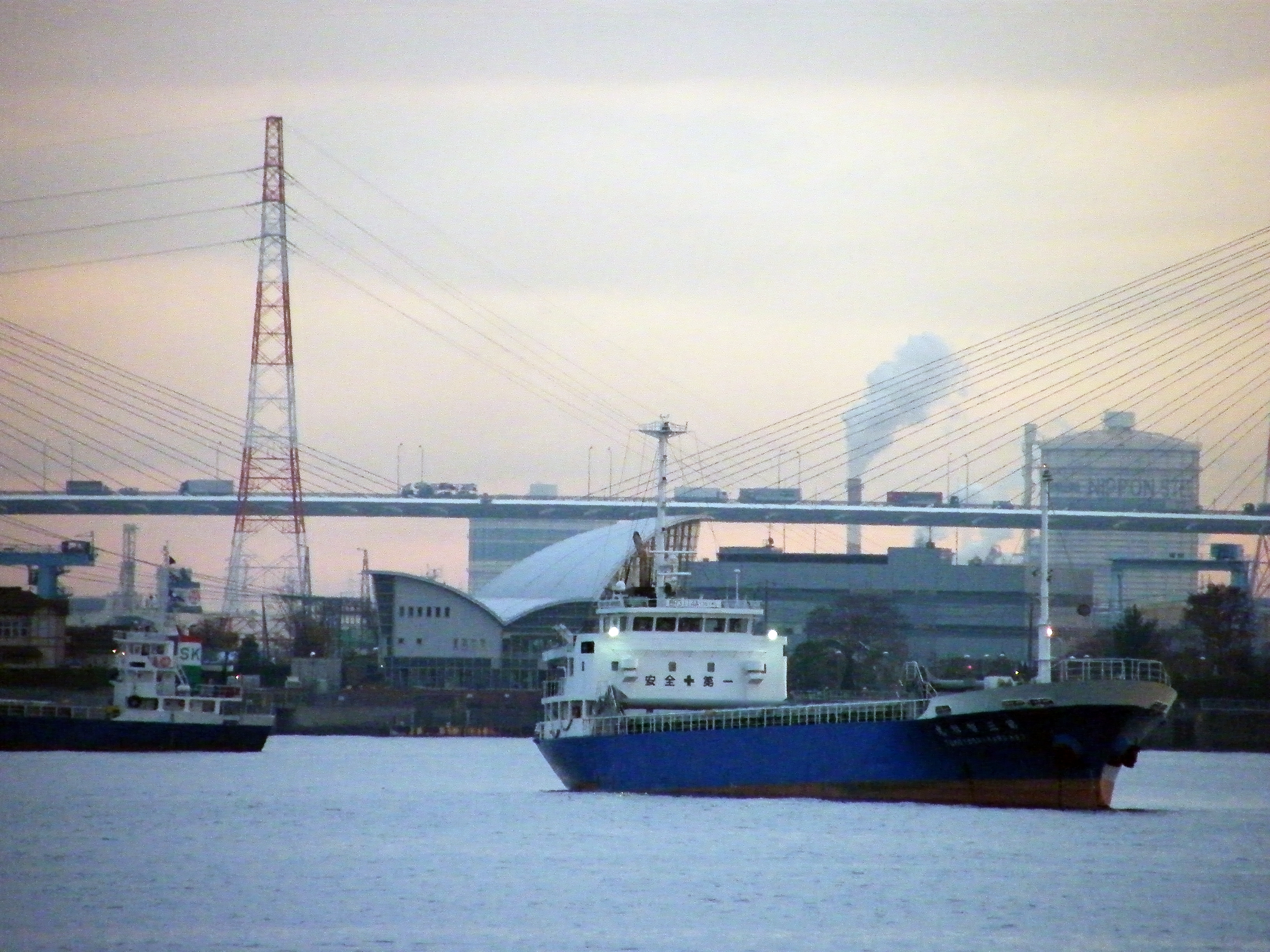
Port of Nagoya

=== Major airports ===
- Chūbu Centrair International Airport
- Nagoya Airport

=== Major railways ===
There are at least 38 passenger train lines in the Greater Nagoya area. JR runs six, Nagoya Subway seven, Meitetsu 18, Kintetsu four, and five other operators one each.

JR Central

- Chūō Main Line
- Taita Line
- Kansai Main Line
- Takayama Main Line
- Tōkaidō Main Line
- Tōkaidō Shinkansen

Other operators

- Aichi Loop Line
- Aonami Line
- Ise Railway
- Jōhoku Line
- Kintetsu
- Linimo
- Meitetsu
- Toyotetsu
- Nagoya Subway
- Yokkaichi Asunarou Railway
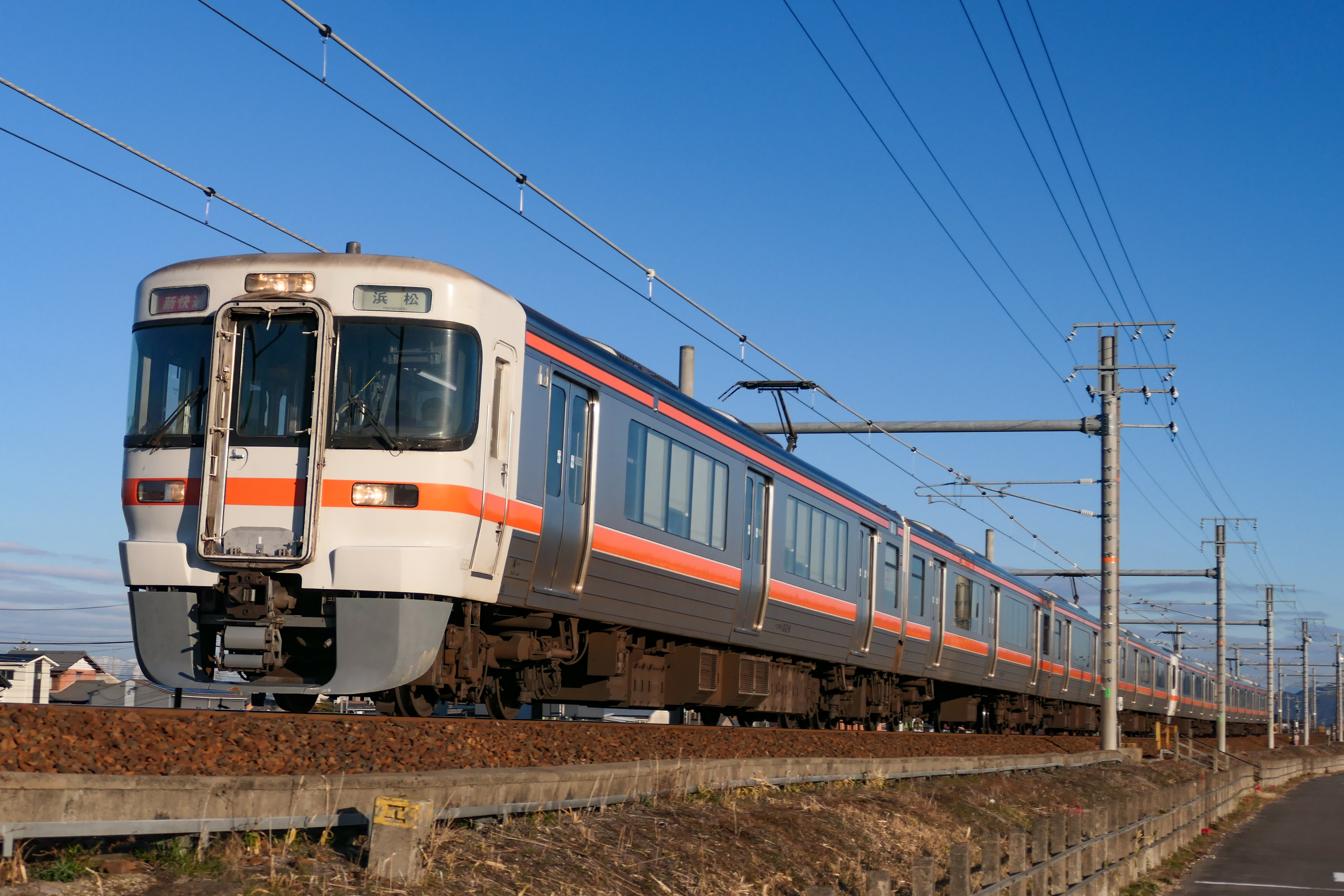
JR Central

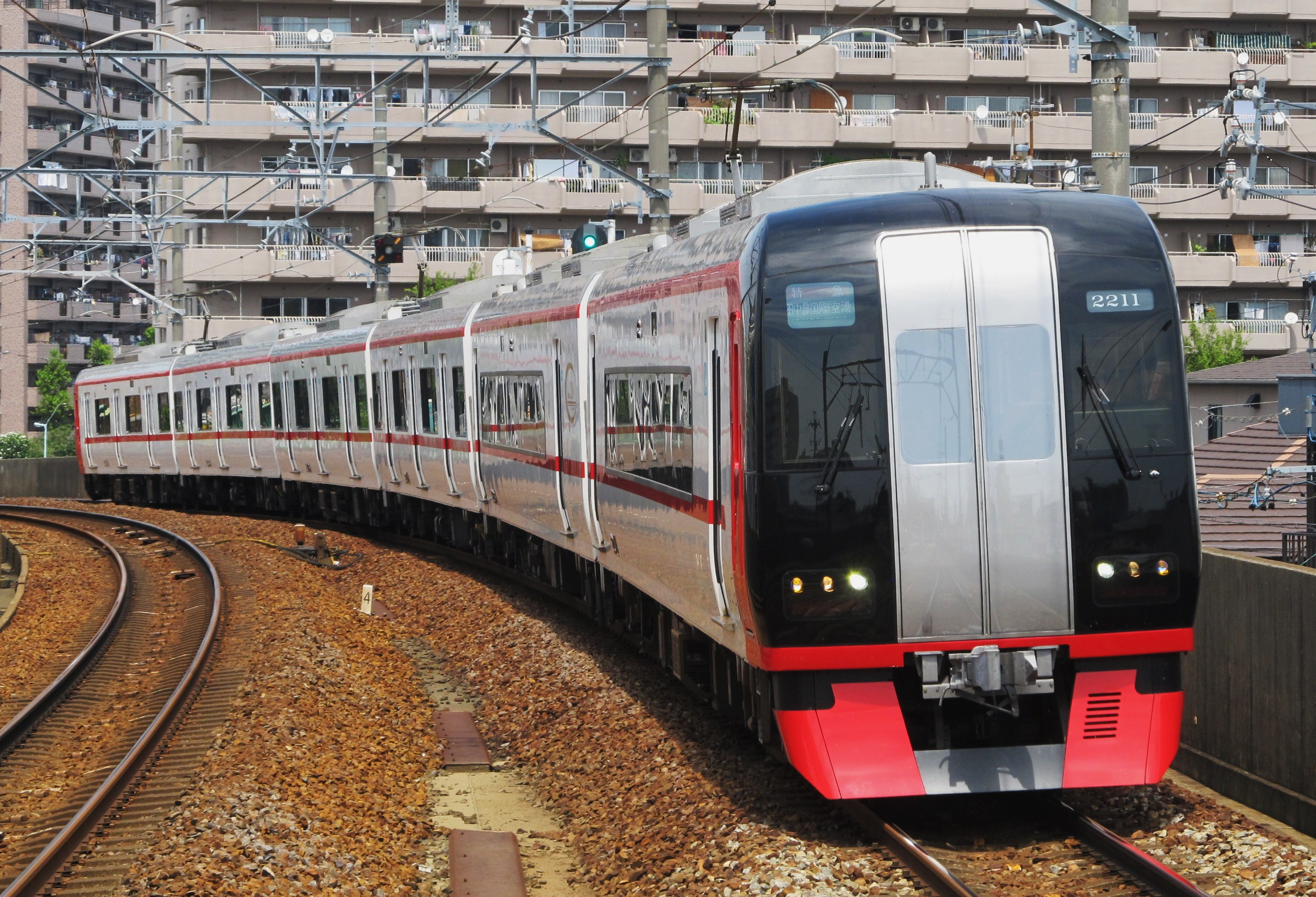
Meitetsu

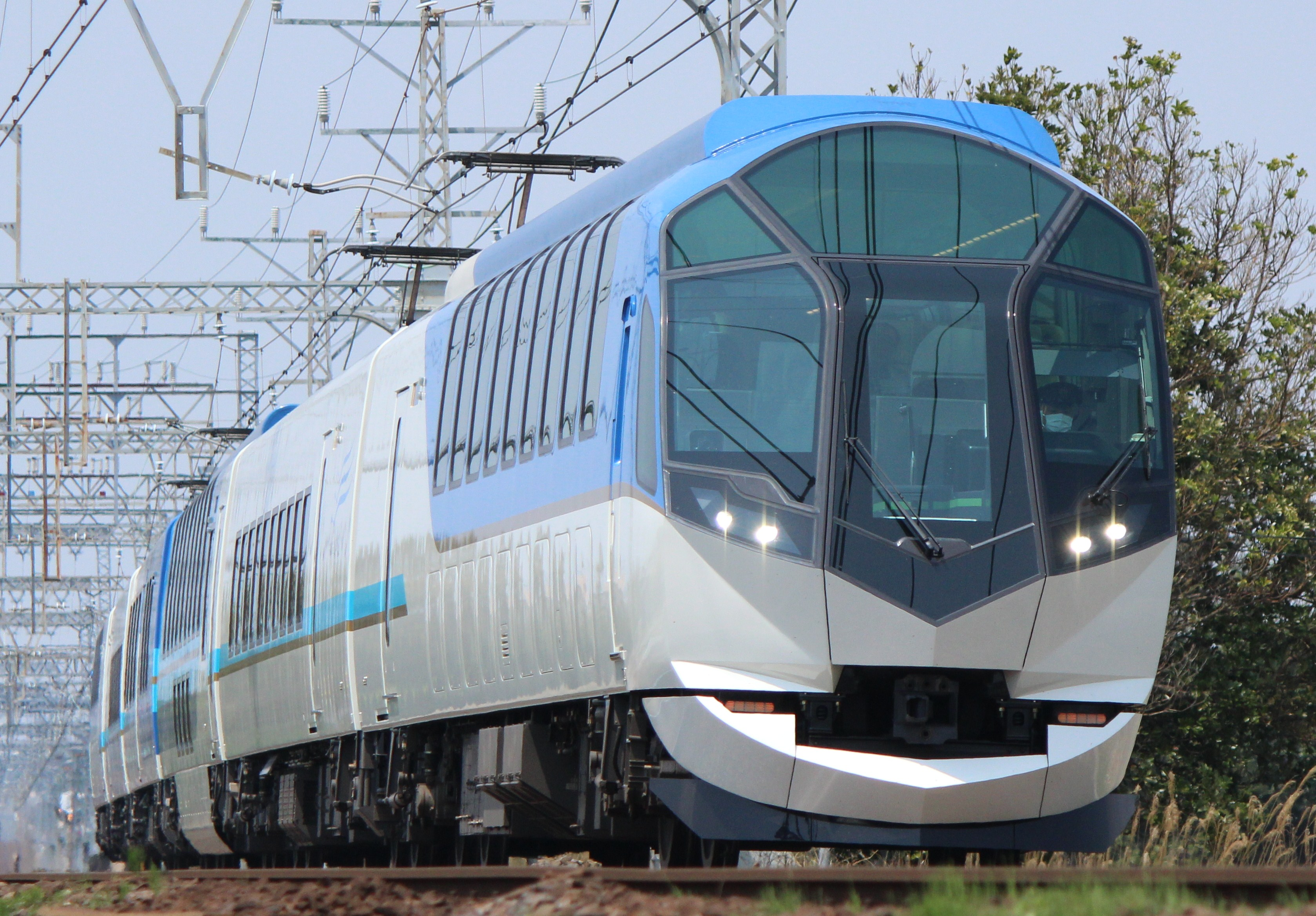
Kintetsu

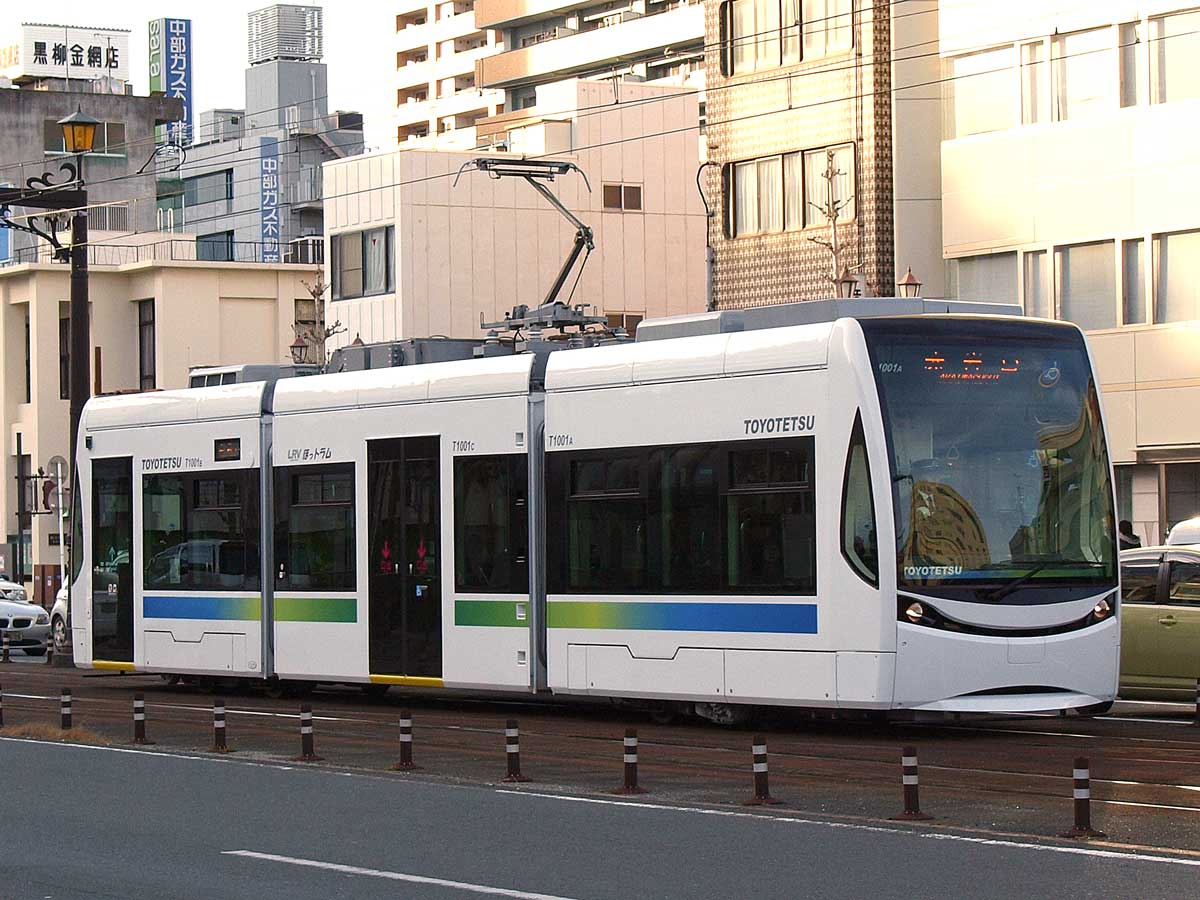
Toyotetsu

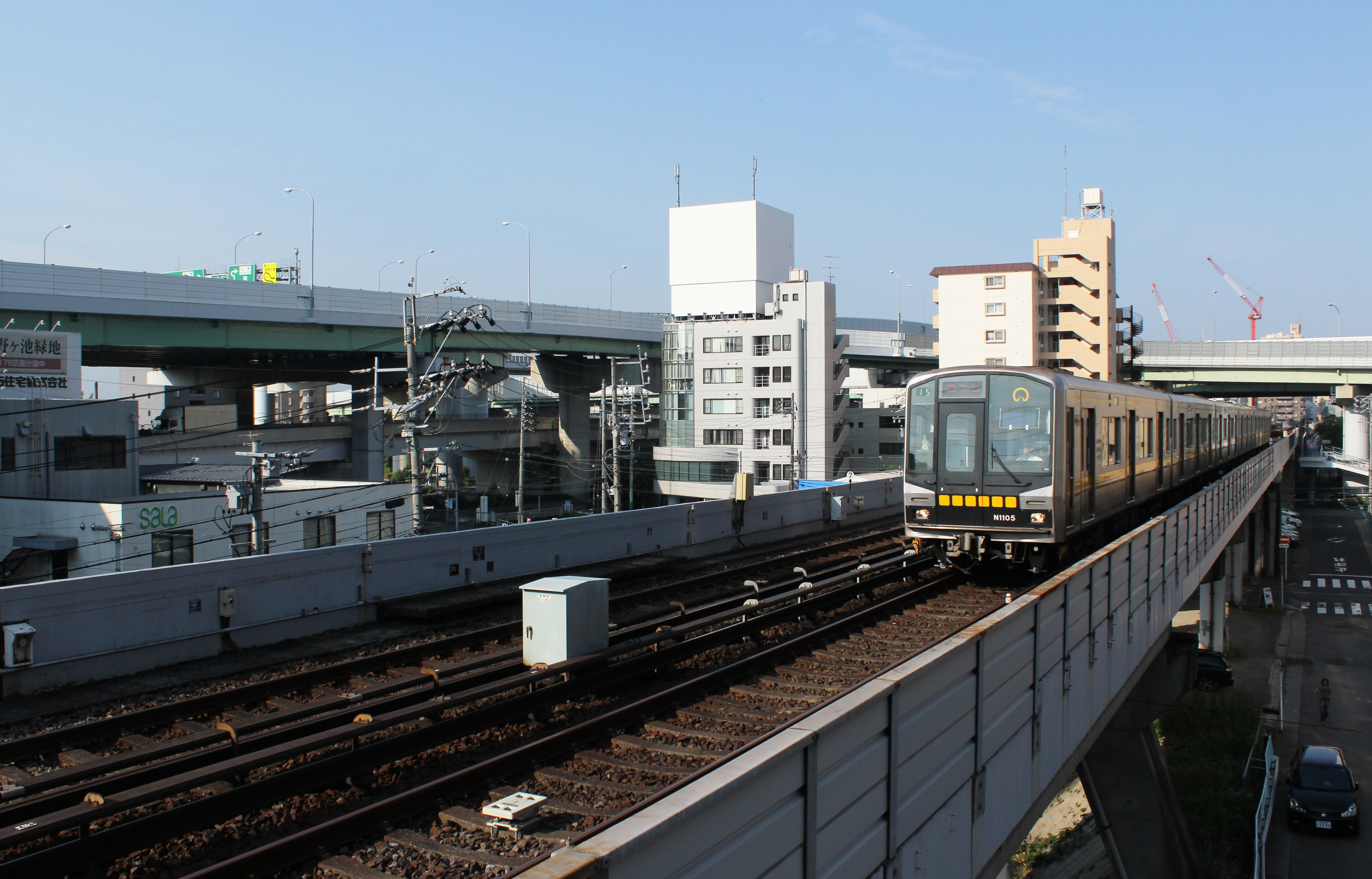
Nagoya Subway

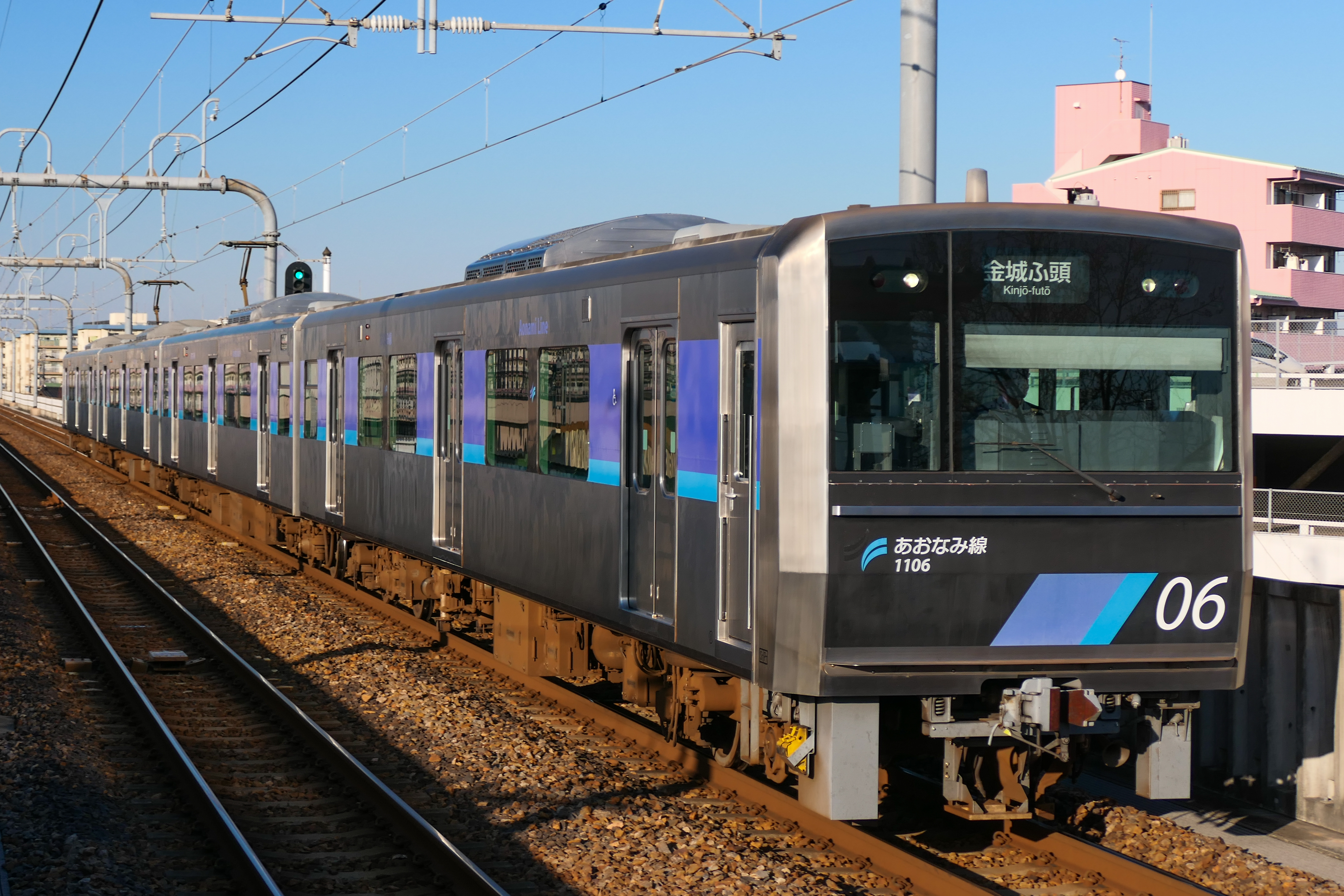
Aonami Line

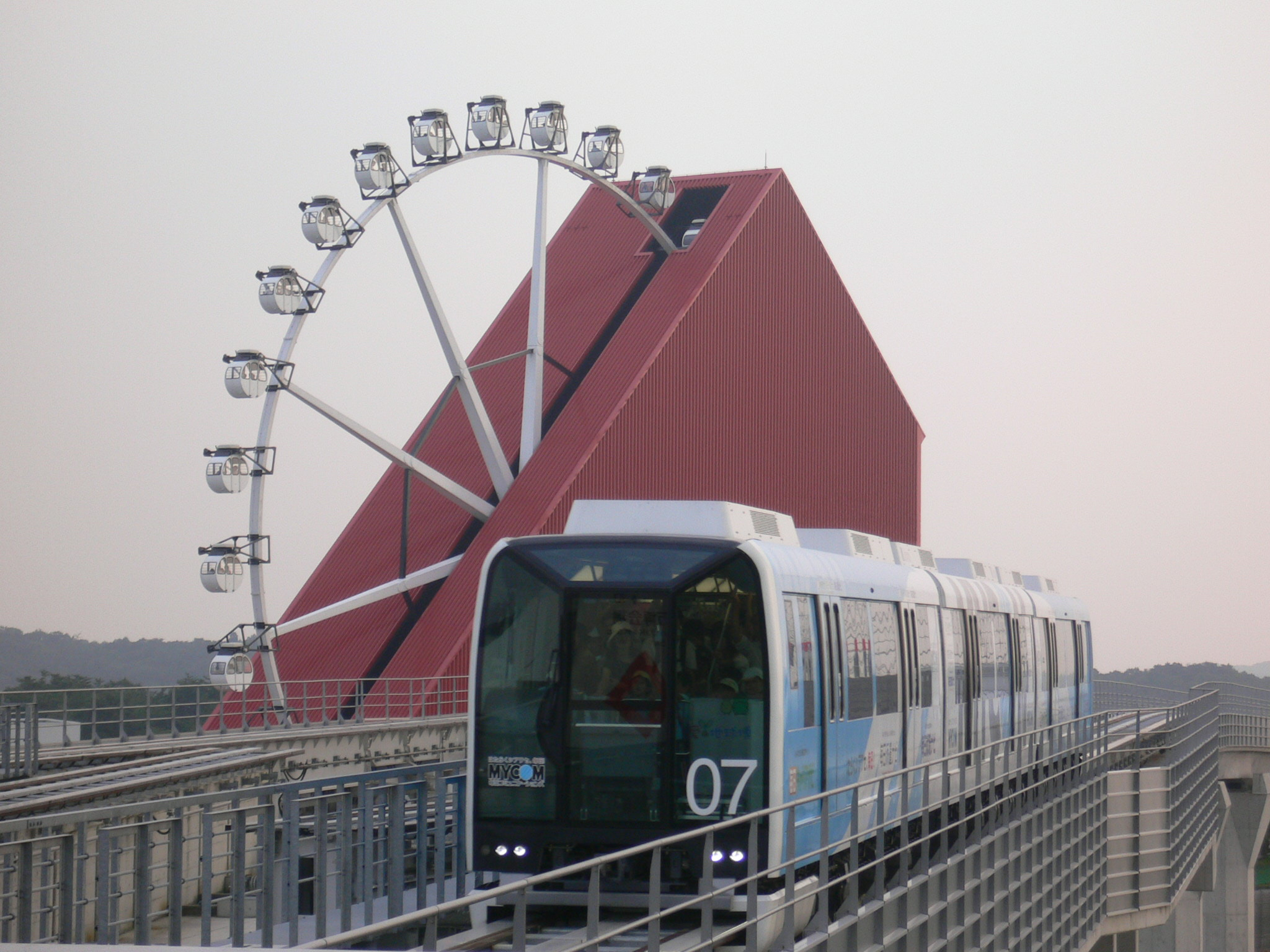
Linimo

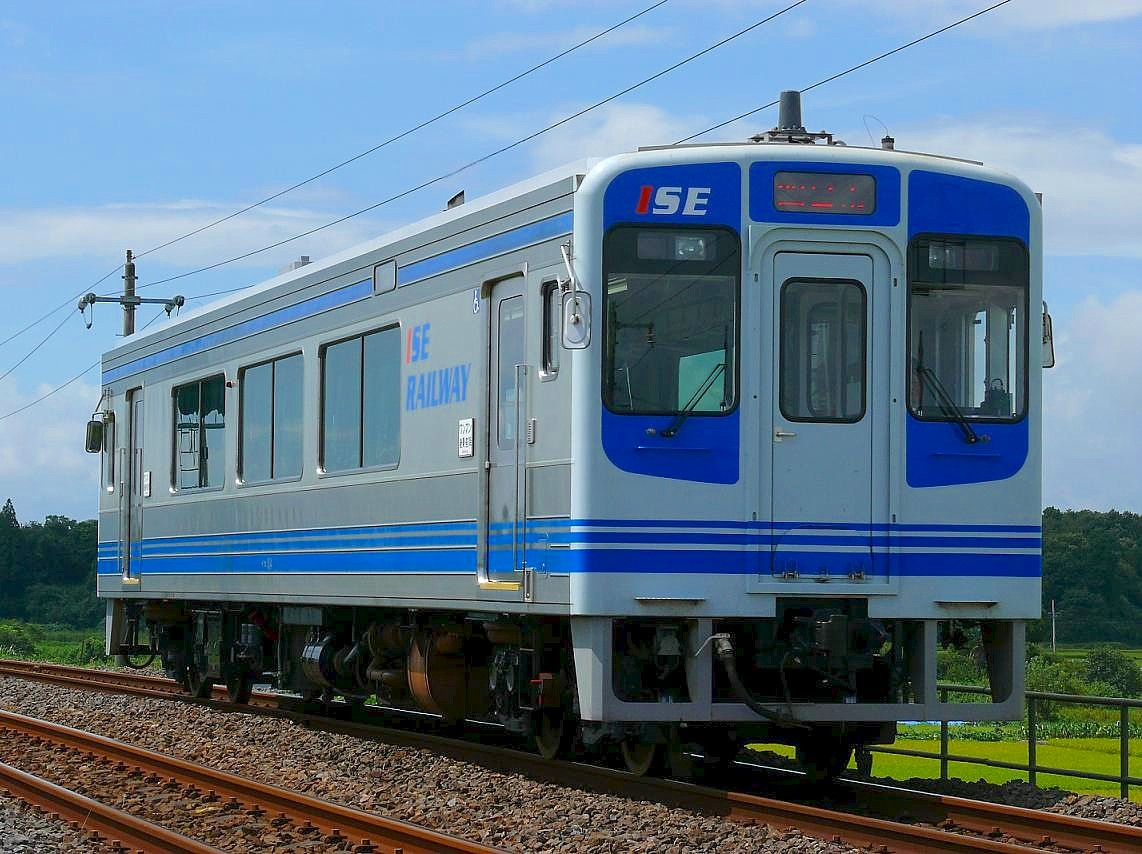
Ise Line

=== Major intercity highways ===
- Chita-Hanto Expressway
- Chūō Expressway
- Higashi-Meihan Expressway
- Isewangan Expressway
- Meishin Expressway
- Tōkai Ring Expressway
- Tōkai-Hokuriku Expressway
- Tomei Expressway

== Demographics ==
Per Japanese census data, and , Chūkyō metropolitan area, also known as greater Nagoya, has had continuous population growth.

Historical population
Year	Pop.	±%
1950	2,237,000	—
1960	4,297,000	+92.1%
1970	6,603,000	+53.7%
1980	7,777,000	+17.8%
1990	8,407,000	+8.1%
2000	8,740,000	+4.0%
2010	9,107,414	+4.2%
2020	9,552,132	+4.9%

== See also ==
- Nagoya
- Greater Nagoya Initiative
- Chūkyō Industrial Area
- Chūkyō Television Broadcasting
- Chukyo University
- List of metropolitan areas in Japan by population

== Notes ==
The area defined by the Chukyo Area Person-Trip Survey, a study of commuter movement, is slightly different from the census definition. It includes southern Aichi and areas immediately north of Gifu City. It adds two cities in Aichi Prefecture (Tahara and Toyohashi) and two cities in Gifu Prefecture (Mino and Seki). Additionally, it excludes two cities in Gifu Prefecture (Ena and Nakatsugawa).
