= List of mergers in Shiga Prefecture =

Here is a list of mergers in Shiga Prefecture, Japan since the Heisei era.

== Mergers from April 1, 1999 to Present ==
- On October 1, 2001 - the town of Rittō (from Kurita District) was elevated to city status. Kurita District was dissolved as a result of this change in status.
- On October 1, 2004 - the former town of Yasu absorbed the town of Chūzu (both from Yasu District) merged to form the city of Yasu. Yasu District was dissolved as a result of this merger.
- On October 1, 2004 - the towns of Kōsei and Ishibe (both from Kōka District) were merged to create the city of Konan.
- On October 1, 2004 - the former town of Kōka absorbed the towns of Kōnan, Minakuchi, Shigaraki and Tsuchiyama (all from Kōka District) to create the city of Kōka. Kōka District was dissolved as a result of this merger.
- On January 1, 2005 - the former town of Takashima absorbed towns of Adogawa, Imazu, Makino and Shin'asahi, and the village of Kutsuki (all from Takashima District) to create the city of Takashima. Takashima District was dissolved as a result of this merger. Also, there are no more villages left in Shiga Prefecture with this creation.
- On February 11, 2005 - the city of Yōkaichi was merged with the towns of Eigenji and Gokashō (both from Kanzaki District), and the towns of Aitō and Kotō (both from Echi District) to create the city of Higashiōmi.
- On February 14, 2005 - the towns of Maihara, Ibuki and Santō (all from Sakata District) were merged to create the city of Maibara.
- On October 1, 2005 - the town of Ōmi (from Sakata District) was merged into the expanded city of Maibara. Sakata District was dissolved as a result of this merger.
- On January 1, 2006 - the town of Notogawa (from Kanzaki District), and the town of Gamō (from Gamō District) were merged into the expanded city of Higashiōmi. Kanzaki District was dissolved as a result of this merger.
- On February 13, 2006 - the old city of Nagahama absorbed the towns of Azai and Biwa (both from Higashiazai District) to create the new and expanded city of Nagahama.
- On February 26, 2006 - the towns of Echigawa and Hatashō (both from Echi District) were merged to create the town of Aishō.
- On March 20, 2006 - the town of Shiga (from Shiga District) was merged into the expanded city of Ōtsu. Shiga District was dissolved as a result of this merger.
- On January 1, 2010 - the towns of Kohoku and Torahime (both from Higashiazai District), and the towns of Kinomoto, Nishiazai, Takatsuki and Yogo (all from Ika District) were merged into the expanded city of Nagahama. Higashiazai District and Ika District were both dissolved as a result of this merger.
- On March 21, 2010 - the town of Azuchi (from Gamō District) was merged into the expanded city of Ōmihachiman.
