= Yamakami Domain =

Yamakami Domain 山上藩
- Domain of Japan
- 1698–1871
- Capital: Yamakami jin'ya
- Area
  - Coordinates: 35°04′44″N 136°18′13.5″E
- Government
  - Type: Daimyō
- Historical era: Edo period
  - Established: 1698
  - Disestablished: 1871
- Today part of: part of Shiga Prefecture

Location of Yamakami jin'ya

Yamakami Domain (山上藩, Yamakami-han) was a Fudai feudal domain under the Tokugawa shogunate of Edo period Japan. It was located in southeastern Ōmi Province, in the Kansai region of central Honshu. The domain was centered at Yamakami jin'ya, located in what is now the Yamakami neighborhood of the city of Higashiōmi in Shiga Prefecture.

== History ==
Yamakami was located in a strategically important location on a road connecting Ōmi with Ise Province and the area was hotly contested by various warlords in the Sengoku period. Yamakami Domain was created for Inagaki Shigetada, a hatamoto in the service of Shogun Tokugawa Ietsuna who rose through the ranks of the Shogunate bureaucracy, including serving as a wakadoshiyori. He gained additional fiefs with his promotions, eventually meeting the required kokudaka to be allowed to establish a cadet branch of the Inagaki clan. Inagaki Shigetada constructed a jin'ya and jōkamachi, but the domain's financial situation became critical during the time of the 3rd daimyō, Inagaki Sadayoshi, when both of the domain's Edo residences burned down in a fire. Fiscal reforms ended in failure, and under his successors the domain's situation went from bad to worse with repeated crop failures and the Great Tenmei famine. Appointments to the posts of Osaka kaban and Sōshaban within the shogunal administration were also a serious drain on resources.

During the Bakumatsu period, the 8th daimyō, Inagaki Motokiyo, served as Ōbangashira and Kaigun Bugyō and was a staunch supporter of the Shogunate. However, when he fell ill and was replaced by Inagaki Motoyoshi at the start of the Boshin War, the domain quickly changed sides to the imperial cause. As with all domains, Yamakami Domain was abolished in 1870 with the abolition of the han system. It subsequently was incorporated into Ōtsu prefecture, and then Shiga Prefecture.

== Bakumatsu period holdings ==
As with most domains in the han system, Yamakami Domain consisted of a discontinuous territories calculated to provide the assigned kokudaka, based on periodic cadastral surveys and projected agricultural yields.

- Ōmi Province
  - 5 villages in Yasu District
  - 9 villages in Kōka District
  - 4 villages in Gamō District
  - 8 villages in Kanzaki District
  - 1 village in Sakata District
  - 1 village in Azai District

== List of daimyō ==
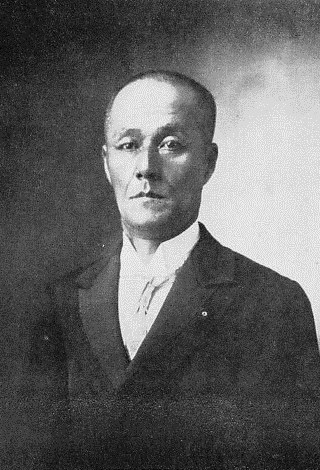
Inagaki Motoyoshi, final daimyō of Yamakami, post-Meiji restoration

- Inagaki clan (Fudai) 1698-1871

	Name	Tenure	Courtesy title	Court Rank	kokudaka
1	Inagaki Shigesada (稲垣重定)	1698–1707	Aki-no-kami (安芸守)	Junior 5th Rank, Lower Grade (従五位下)	13,000 koku
2	Inagaki Shigefusa (稲垣重房)	1708–1720	Nagato-no-kami (長門守)	Junior 5th Rank, Lower Grade (従五位下)	13,000 koku
3	Inagaki Sadakazu (稲垣定享)	1720–1740	Aki-no-kami (安芸守)	Junior 5th Rank, Lower Grade (従五位下)	13,000 koku
4	Inagaki Sadakazu (稲垣定計)	1740–1792	Nagato-no-kami (長門守)	Junior 5th Rank, Lower Grade (従五位下)	13,000 koku
5	Inagaki Sadaatsu (稲垣定淳)	1792–1823	Wakasa-no-kami (若狭守)	Junior 5th Rank, Lower Grade (従五位下)	13,000 koku
6	Inagaki Sadanari (稲垣定成)	1823–1834	Nagato-no-kami (長門守)	Junior 5th Rank, Lower Grade (従五位下)	13,000 koku
7	Inagaki Motoatsu (稲垣太篤)	1834–1860	Nagato-no-kami (長門守)	Junior 5th Rank, Lower Grade (従五位下)	13,000 koku
8	Inagaki Motokiyo (稲垣太清)	1860–1869	Wakasa-no-kami (若狭守)	Junior 5th Rank, Lower Grade (従五位下)	13,000 koku
9	Inagaki Motoyoshi (稲垣太祥)	1869–1871	-none-	3rd Rank (正三位)	13,000 koku

== See also ==
- List of Han
