= Takebe taisha =

Shinto shrine in Ōtsu, Shiga, Japan

Takebe Taisha 建部大社
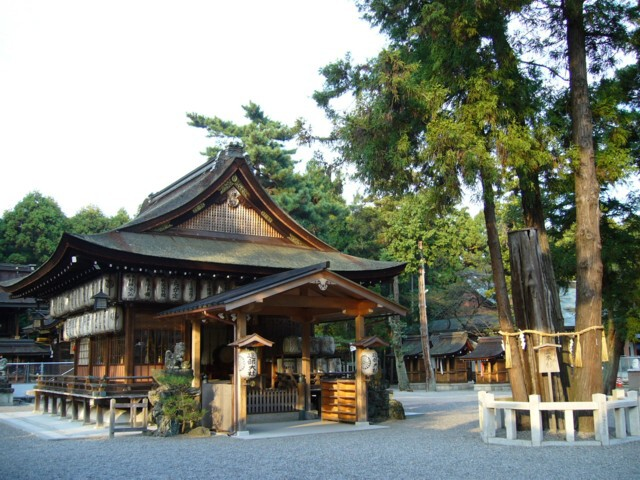
- Heiden of Takebe Taisha and three sacred sugi trees

- Location within Shiga Prefecture Location within Japan

Religion
- Affiliation: Shinto
- Deity: Yamato Takeru; Ōkuninmushi no Mikoto
- Festival: Reitaisai (15 April)

Location
- Location: 16-1, Jinryō 1-chōme, Ōtsu, Shiga, Japan
- Interactive map of Takebe Taisha 建部大社
- Coordinates: 34°58′24.6″N 135°54′48.62″E

Architecture
- Style: Nagare-zukuri
- Founder: Emperor Keiko
- Established: c.Kofun period

Website
- Official website

Takebe Shrine (建部大社, Takebe Taisha) is a Shinto shrine located in the city of Ōtsu, Shiga Prefecture, Japan. It is the ichinomiya of former Ōmi Province. The main kami enshrined are Ōkuninushi and Yamato Takeru. The shrine's main festival is held annually on April 15.

== Enshrined kami ==
The kami enshrined at Takebe Taisha are:

- Yamato Takeru (日本武尊), folk hero and the son of Emperor Keikō
- Ōkuninushi (大己貴命), the god of nation-building, agriculture, medicine, and protective magic

== History ==
According to the shrine's legend, its foundation has strong connections with the Yamato Takeru mythology. Following Yamato Takeru's death, his wife Princess Futaji resided at a place called Chigusatake, Takebe-go in what is now Kanzaki District, Shiga, together with their son Takebe Inai Butsumei. A shrine was erected in that location 43rd year of the reign of the legendary Emperor Keikō, who was Yamato Takeru's father. The place name "Takebe" is thought to come from the name "Takeru", and is also found in other places connected with theYamato Takeru myth. Later, under the reign of Emperor Tenmu, the shrine was relocated to Seto, in Kurita District and became the guardian shrine for Ōmi Province. However, in 755 the shrine was moved to its current location on orders of Empress Kōken, and Ōkuninushi was also installed as a deity at the shrine as a bunrei of Ōmiwa Shrine. The shrine appears in various Heian period documents, including the Nihon Sandai Jitsuroku, Ruijū Kokushi and the Engishiki, and came to be regarded as the ichinomiya of Ōmi Province.

When Minamoto no Yoritomo was sent to exile in Izu following the defeat of the Genji clan in the Heiji Rebellion, he stopped to pray for the revival of the Genji at this shrine. In 1190, when the Heike clan was overthrown, he again prayed at this shrine in thanksgiving, and the shrine became a popular pilgrimage destination for good fortune. The shrine was rebuilt in 1233 by Kujō Yoritsune.

- 1233 (Jōei 2): Kujō Yoritsune completely rebuilt the structures of the shrine. In 1868, when Emperor Meiji made his first visit to Edo, he dispatched an emissary to the shrine with a heikaku for the kami.

In 1871, the shrine was listed under the name Takebe Jinja (建部神社) as a prefectural shrine under the Modern system of ranked Shinto shrines under State Shinto. In 1885, it was promoted to an Imperial shrine, 2nd rank (官幣中社, Kanpei Chūsha) and in 1900 to an Imperial shrine, 1st rank (官幣大社, Kanpei-taisha). In 1945, the shrine was used as the design for the first 1000 yen note issued. In 1948 the shrine's name was officially changed to "Takebe Taisha".

The shrine is 15 minutes on foot from Karahashimae Station on the Keihan Electric Railway Ishiyama Sakamoto Line.

== Gallery ==
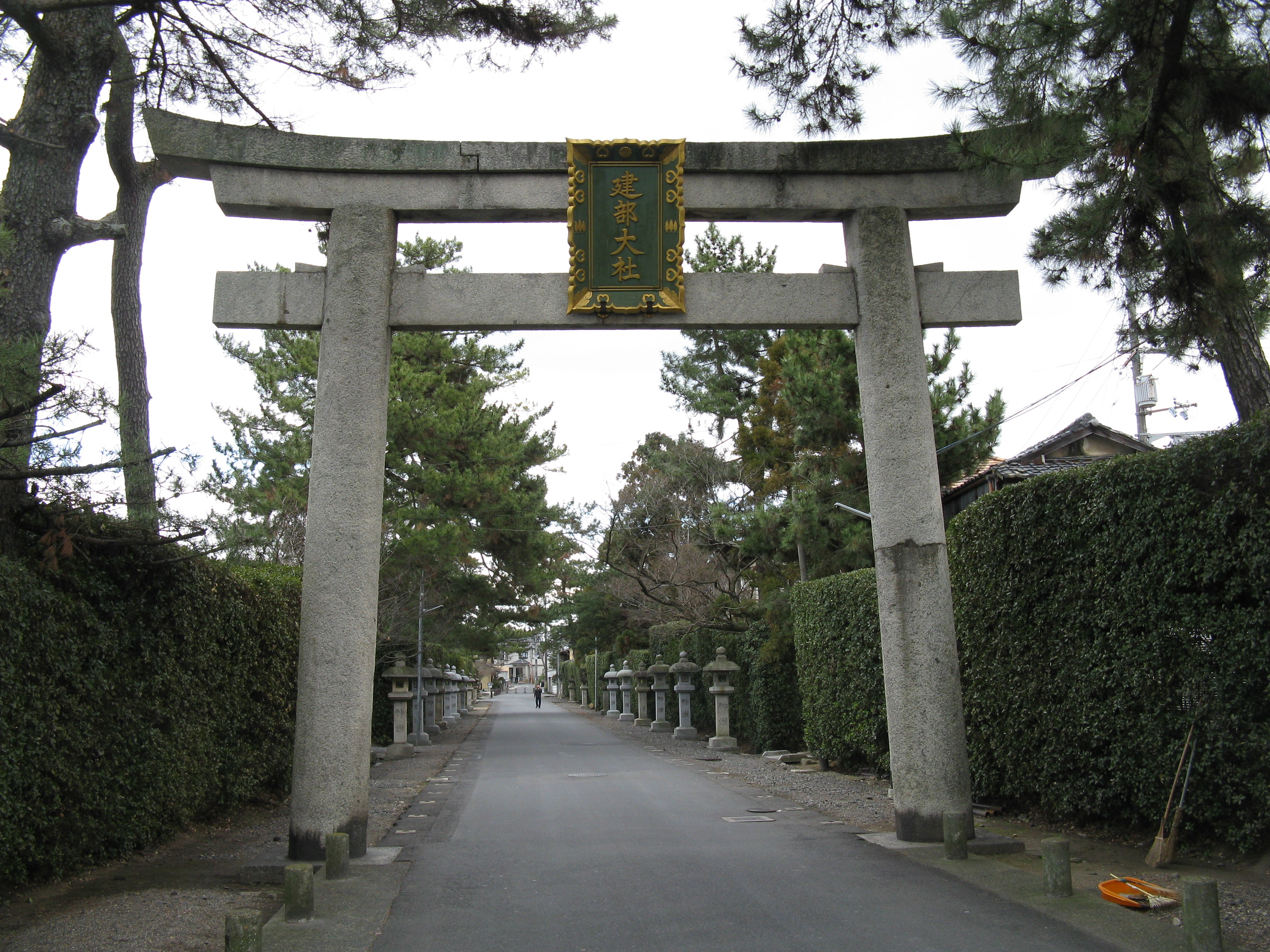
First Torii

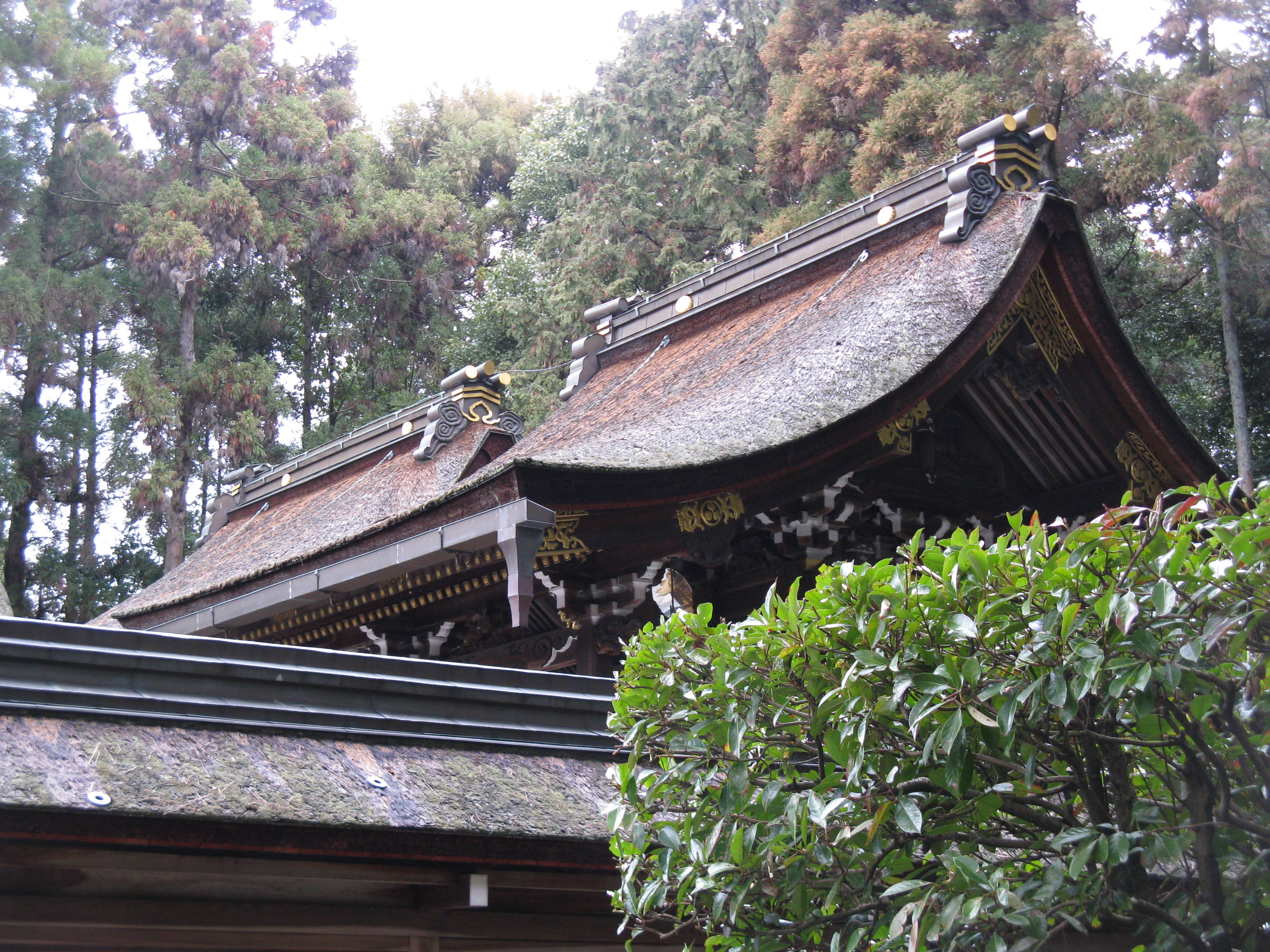
Honden

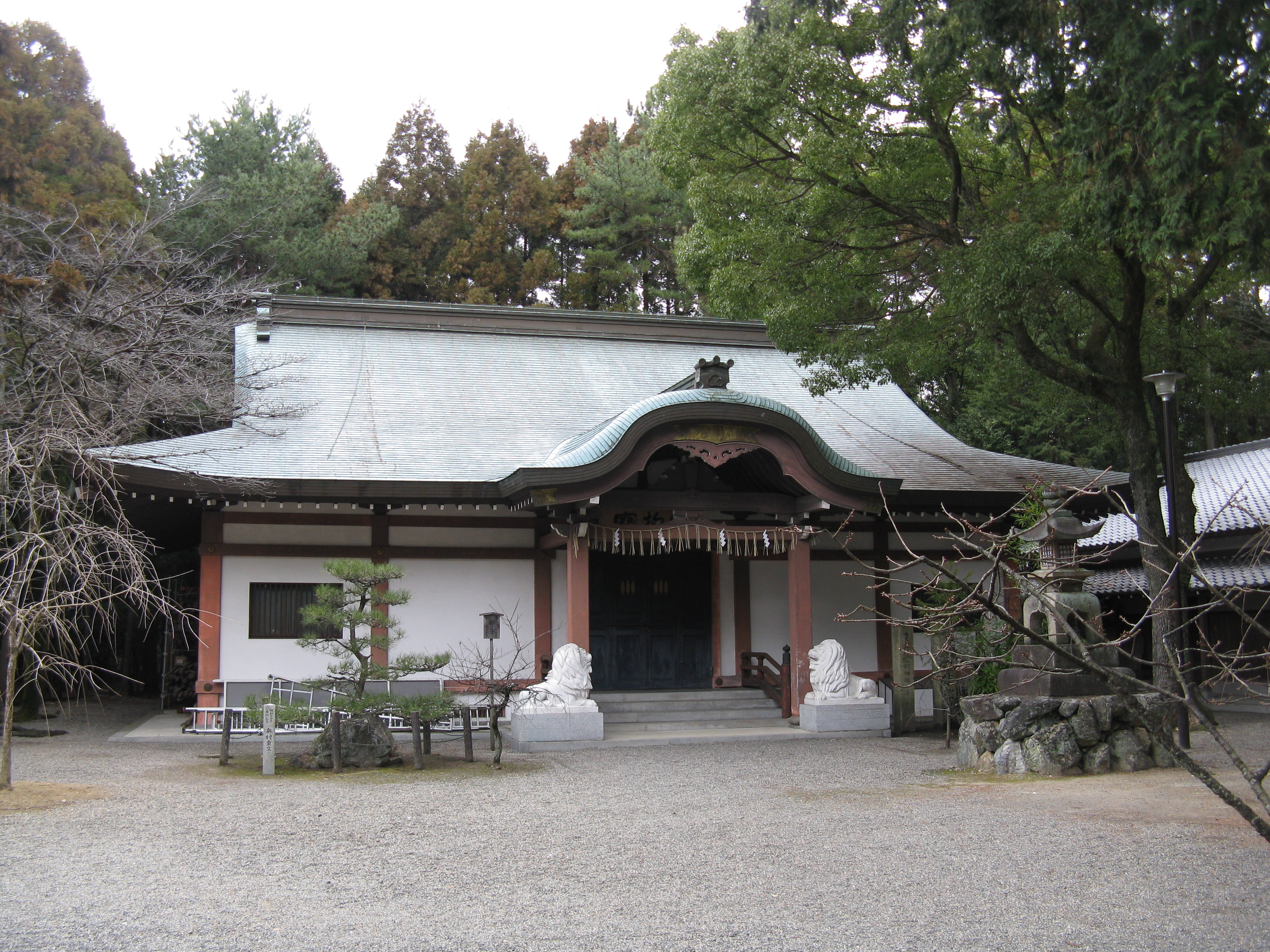
Museum

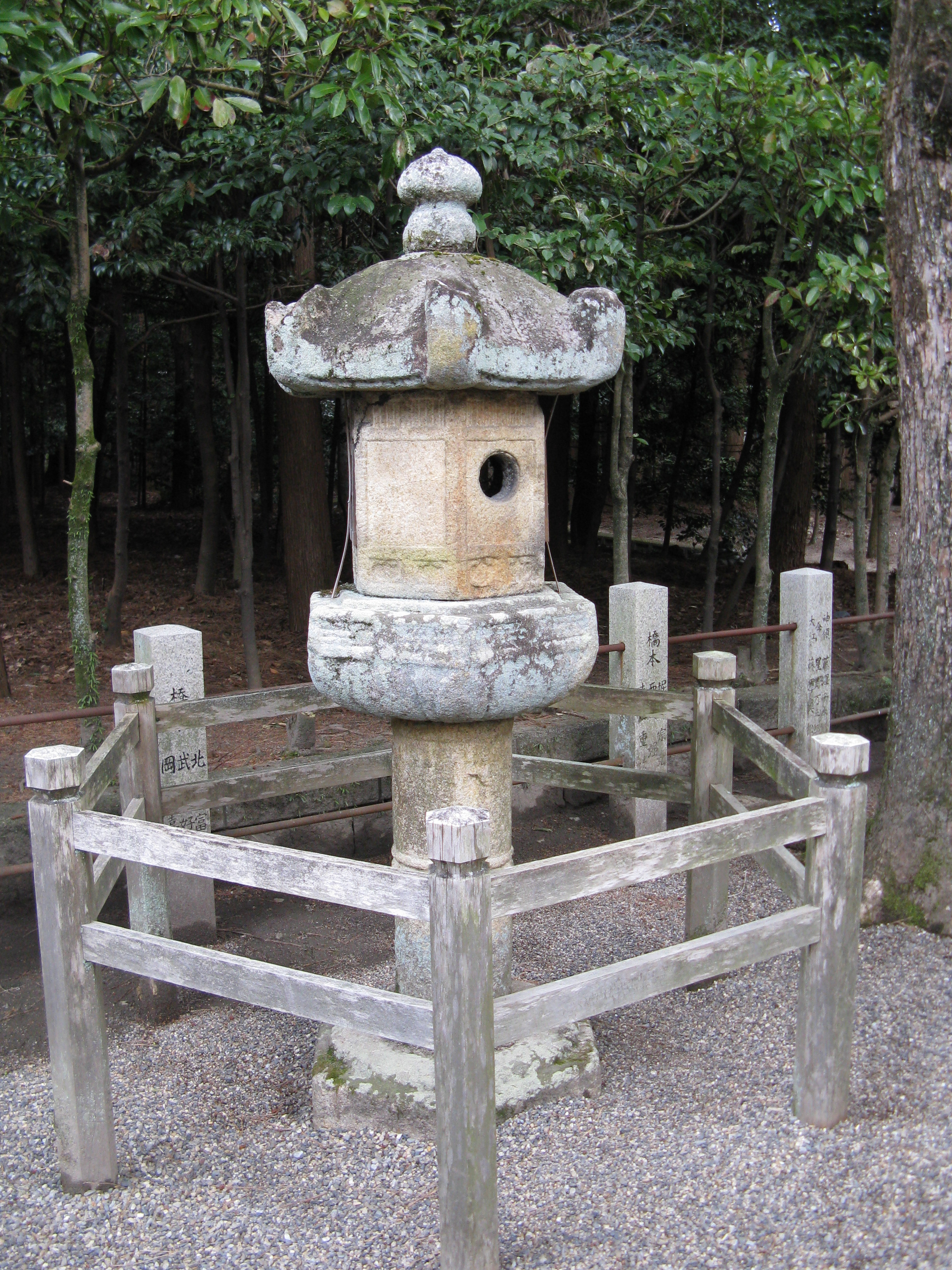
Stone lantern (ICP)

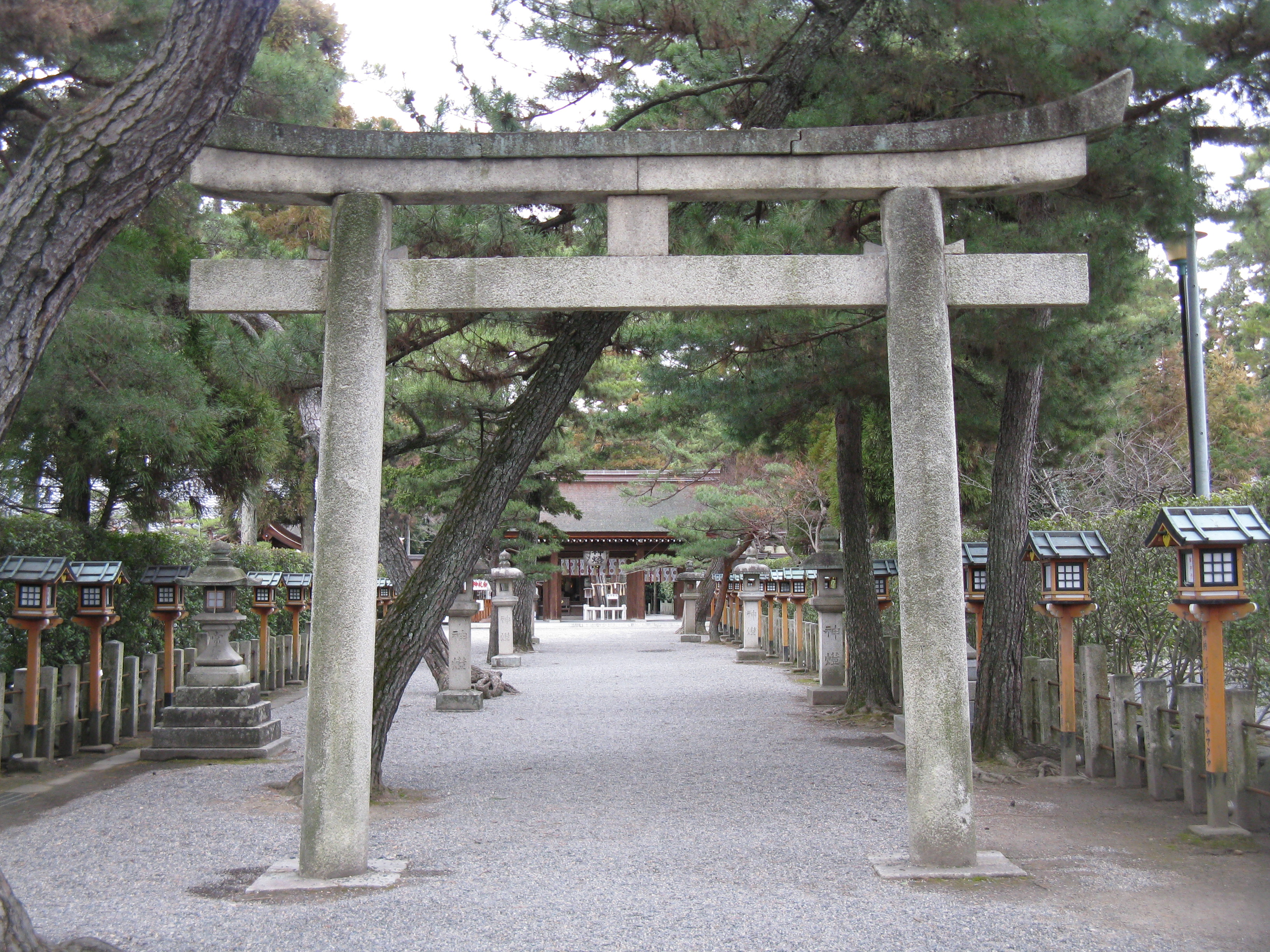
Second Torii

== Cultural Properties ==
=== Important Cultural Properties ===
- Tōrō stone lantern (石燈籠), Kamakura period (1270).
- Wooden Statue of a Female Deity (木造女神坐像 附：木造小女神坐像)Heian period; set of two

== See also ==
- List of Shinto shrines
- Ichinomiya
