= Tonomura =

Tonomura (written: 外村) is a Japanese surname. Notable people with the surname include:

- Akira Tonomura (1942–2012), Japanese physicist
- Hisashi Tonomura (born 1972), Japanese musician
- Shigeru Tonomura (1902–1961), Japanese author
