= Orihara =

Orihara (written: 折原 lit. "opportunity field") is a Japanese surname. Notable people with the surname include:

- Kei Orihara (折原 恵, born 1948), Japanese photographer
- Masao Orihara (折原 昌夫, born 1969), Japanese professional wrestler
- Yuka Orihara (born 2000), Finnish ice dancer

== Fictional characters ==
- Izaya Orihara (折原 臨也), a character in the light novel series Durarara!!

== See also ==
- Orihara Station, a railway station in Yorii, Saitama Prefecture, Japan
