= Shigeru Tonomura =

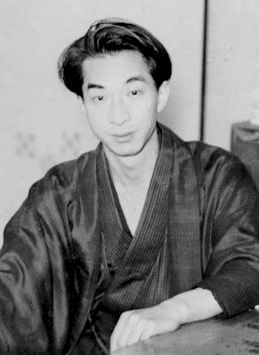
Shigeru Tonomura

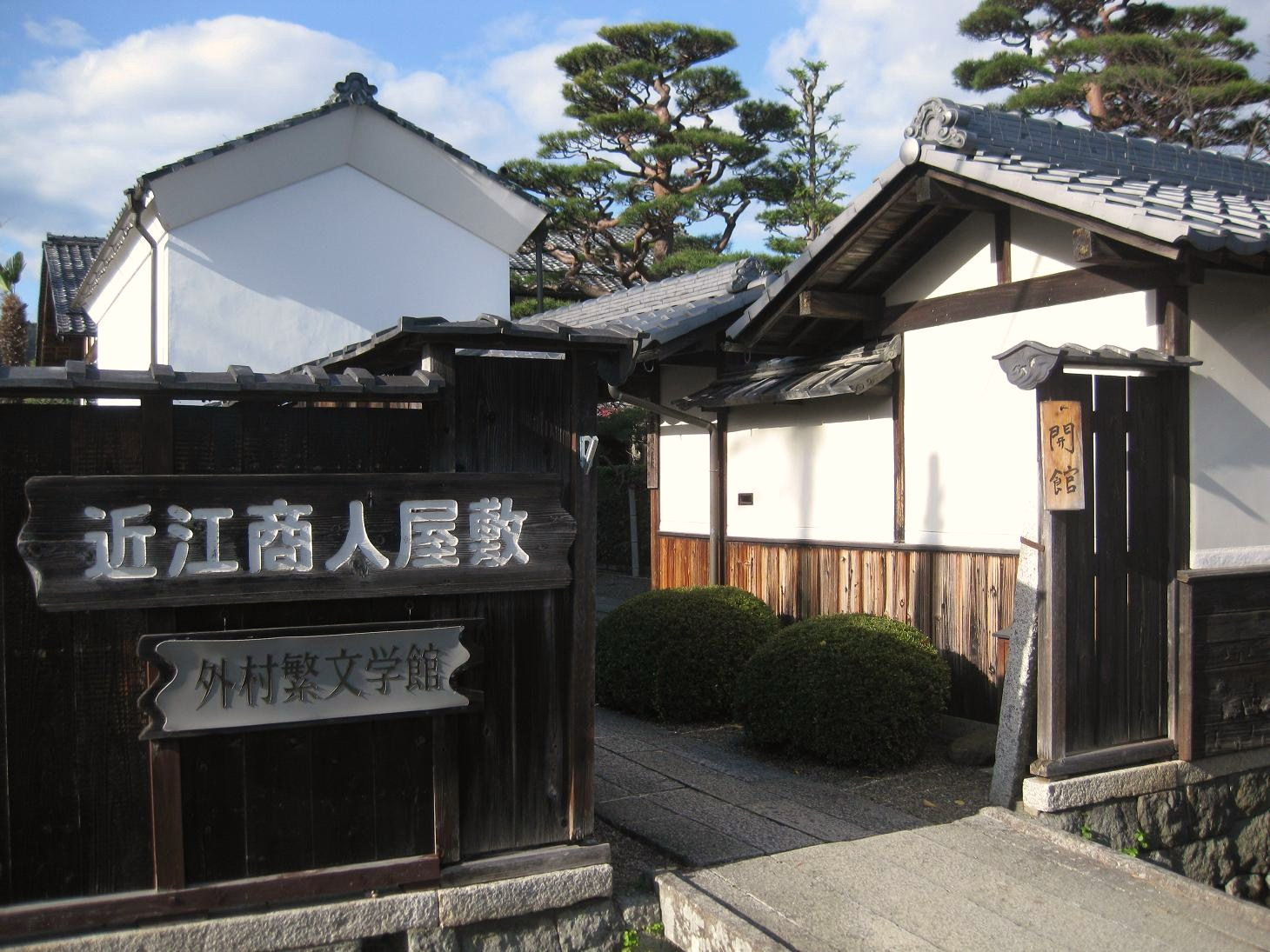
Tonomura's house, now a museum

Shigeru Tonomura (外村 繁, Tonomura Shigeru, December 23, 1902 – July 28, 1961) was a Japanese author of I novels. Kanji of his real name was 外村 茂, but it was the same reading as the pen name.

Tonomura was born into a conservative merchant's family in Shiga Prefecture and raised by devout parents who believed in Pure Land Buddhism. After graduation from the University of Tokyo with a degree in economics, he took over the family business as a wholesale cotton merchant. His house in Gokashōkondō-chō, Higashiōmi, is now a museum that reflects Ōmi Province merchant life.

In 1933, Tonomura handed over control of the business to his brother and began to write seriously. He received the 1956 Noma Literary Prize for Ikada (筏) and the 1960 Yomiuri Prize for Miotsukushi (澪標). Tonomura was good friends with Motojirō Kajii.
