= Echigawa-juku =

Pre-modern Japan post-station along highway

Echigawa-juku 愛知川宿
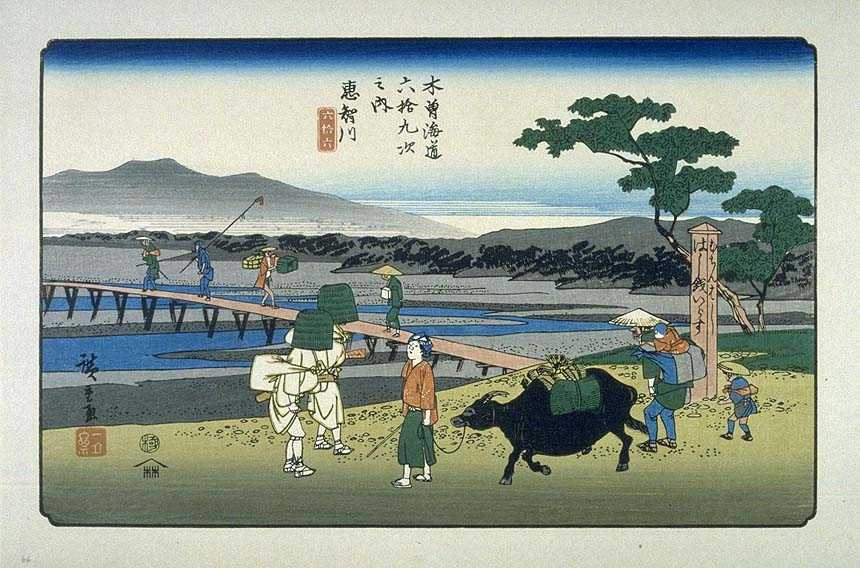
- Hiroshige's print of Echigawa-juku, part of the Sixty-nine Stations of the Kiso Kaidō series

General information
- Location: Aishō, Shiga (former Ōmi Province); Japan
- Coordinates: 35°10′18.7″N 136°12′28.3″E
- Elevation: 105 m (344 ft)
- System: post station
- Line: Nakasendō
- Distance: 480 km from Edo
Location
- Location within Shiga Prefecture Location within Japan

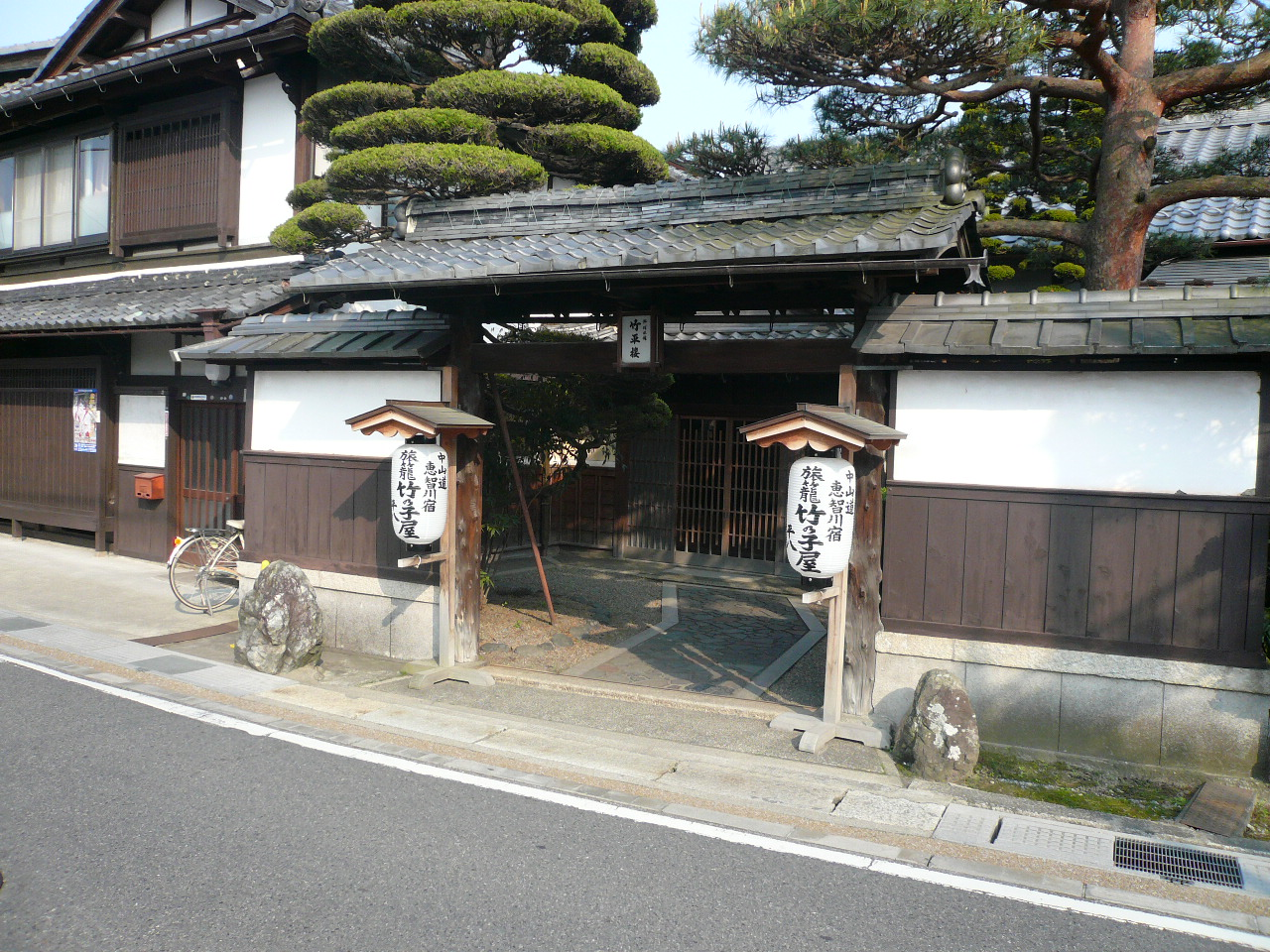
Surviving hatago of Echigawa-juku

Echigawa-juku (愛知川宿) was the sixty-fifth of the sixty-nine stations of the Nakasendō highway connecting Edo with Kyoto in Edo period Japan. It was located in the present-day town of Aishō, Echi District, Shiga Prefecture, Japan, on the east side of the Echi River.

== History ==
Echigawa-juku has a very long history, and was one of the original staging points on the ancient Tōsandō highway connecting the capital of Heian-kyō with the provinces of eastern Japan from the end of the Nara period onwards. It is mentioned by name in the medieval chronicle Taiheiki as a place where Kitabatake Akiie stayed in 1336. During the Muromachi and Sengoku periods, it was a stopping place for traveling merchants (Ōmi shōnin (近江商人)) who originated from Ōmi Province. It was also known for Bin-temari (びん細工手まり), a local folk craft consisting of an embroidered ball inside a round glass container.

In the early Edo period, the system of post stations on the Nakasendō was formalized by the Tokugawa shogunate in 1602. Echigawa-juku was a popular stopping point for pilgrims on their way to the Shinto shrine of Taga-taisha. It was also on the sankin-kōtai route by the Kishū Tokugawa clan and other western daimyō to-and-from the Shogun's court in Edo.

Per the 1843 "中山道宿村大概帳" (Nakasendō Shukuson Taigaichō) guidebook issued by the Inspector of Highways (道中奉行, Dōchu-būgyō), the town had a population of 929 in 199 houses, including one honjin, two waki-honjin, and 28 hatago. Echigawa-juku is 480 kilometers from Edo and 55 kilometers from Kyoto. For travelers from Kyoto or Ōtsu, Echigawa was often the first or second stop on the route.

During the Bakumatsu period, Princess Kazu-no-miya stayed at Echigawa-juku on her way to marry Shogun Tokugawa Iemochi in Edo.

== Modern Echigawa-juku ==
Modern Echigawa-juku is well-preserved, and has a number of buildings which are National Tangible Cultural Properties:

- Fujiya Honten (藤居本家) , built 1832, sake brewer
- Takehei-ryo (竹平楼), built 1758, former hatago, now a ryōtei.
- former Tanaka residence (竹平楼),

== Echigawa-juku in The Sixty-nine Stations of the Kiso Kaidō ==
Utagawa Hiroshige's ukiyo-e print of Echigawa-juku dates from 1835 -1838. The print does not actually show the post station at all, but shows travelers crossing an improbably narrow depiction of the Miyuki-bashi, a wooden bridge across the Echigawa River built in 1831 which replaced a ferry service. A post at the foot of the bridge states "toll free". The travelers include two Komusō mendicant monks with their distinctive bamboo hats and shukuhachi flutes, speaking with woman leading an oxen with a loaded basket on its back. An old man with a heavy backpack is walking towards the bridge with child, and on the bridge itself are a number of other travelers. The high mountain on the left background is Mount Kannonji, where Oda Nobunaga built Azuchi Castle.

== Neighboring post towns ==
Nakasendō
Takamiya-juku - Echigawa-juku - Musa-juku
