= Ōmi Province =

Former province of Japan

Map of Japanese provinces (1868) with Omi Province highlighted

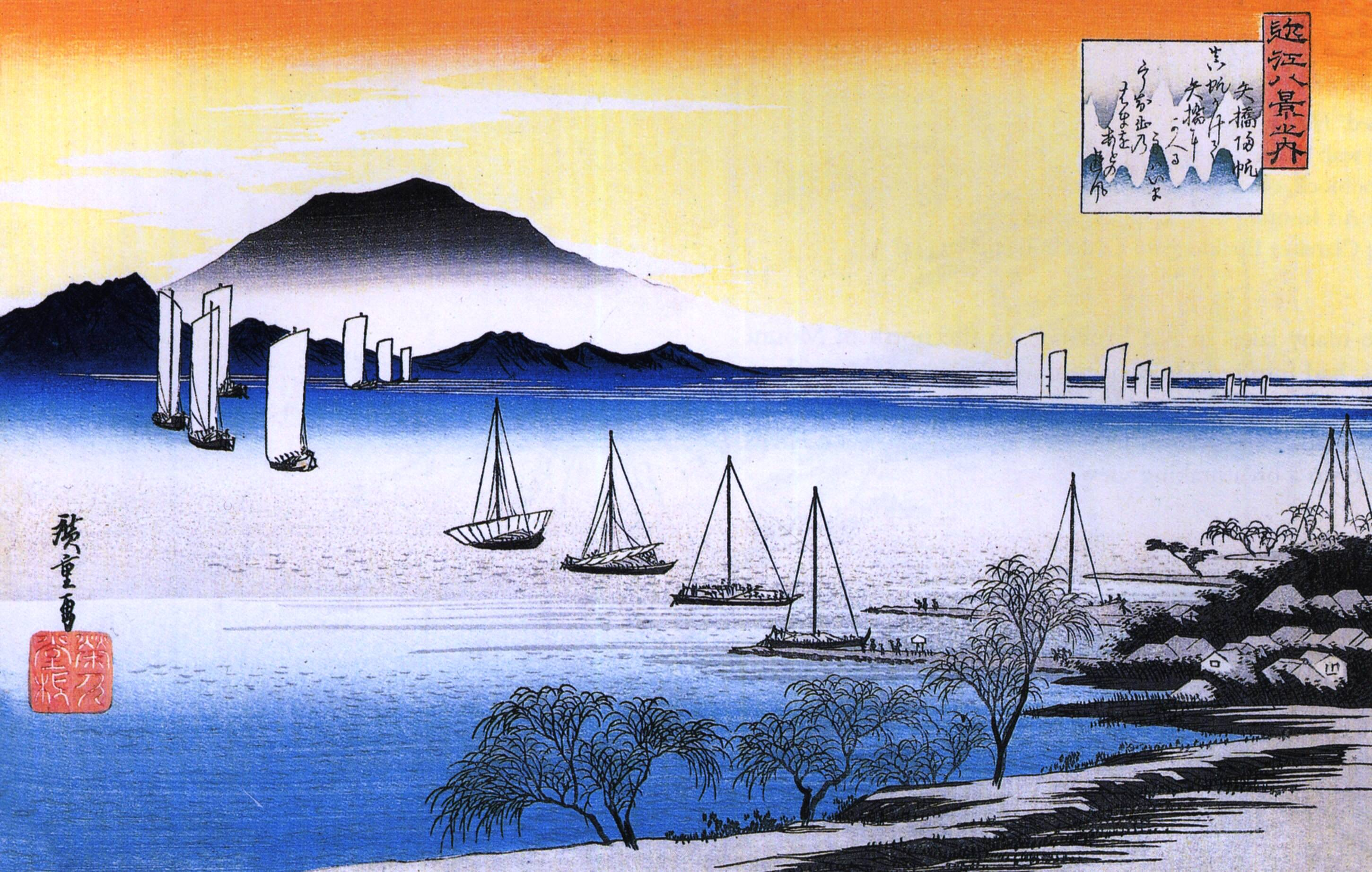
Ukiyo-e print by Hiroshige of the sailboats at Yahashi, one of the Eight Views of Ōmi, c. 1834

Ōmi Province (近江国, Ōmi no Kuni; Japanese pronunciation: [ó̞ò̞.mʲì (nò̞ kɯ̈̀.ɲ̟ì)]) was a province of Japan, which comprised the same land area as modern-day Shiga Prefecture. It was one of the provinces that made up the Tōsandō circuit. Its nickname is Gōshū (江州). Under the Engishiki classification system, Ōmi was ranked as one of the 13 "great countries" (大国) in terms of importance, and one of the "near countries" (近国) in terms of distance from the imperial capital Kyoto.

Ōmi bordered on Wakasa and Echizen Provinces to the north, Mino and Ise Provinces to the east, Iga and Yamato Provinces to the south, and Yamashiro and Tanba Provinces to the west. Lake Biwa, Japan's largest lake, is located at the center of the province.

== Naming ==
Prior to the establishment of Ōmi as the province name, modern-day Lake Biwa and the region surrounding it, historically, had been referred to using a variety of different names. These names were essentially of two types: ones that reflected the meaning 淡海, "freshwater sea", including 「あはうみ」 and 「あふみ」, and ones that reflected the meaning 近淡海, "near freshwater sea", including 「ちかつあはうみ」 and 「ちかつあふみ」. The "sea" meaning reflected the then-held notion of a lake as an inland sea. The "near" meaning reflected the proximity of the lake to the capital region at the time, and was prepended to the name to contrast it with the "far" freshwater sea now known as Lake Hamana.

Consistent with changes over time to other Japanese pronunciations, the spoken name of the region evolved from あはうみ to あふみ to おうみ. The written form of the province name, however, followed a different path, and therefore is inconsistent with the spoken form. After the enactment and enforcement of the Taiho Code in 701 and the decree of 713, which stipulated that the names of the provinces defined under the Ritsuryō system should be written using two auspicious kanji, the kanji 近江 were assigned to the province, with the first of these reflecting "near", and the second reflecting "body of water". Thus, this name is an example of a jukujikun reading, in which a multi-character word's overall reading (i.e., pronunciation) does not correspond directly to any of the ordinary readings of its individual characters.

== History ==
The area of Ōmi has been settled since at least the Yayoi period, and the traces of several large settlements have been found. During the Kofun period, the area appears to have been dominated by several powerful immigrant clans, most notably the Wani clan, which was originally from Baekje, a state in the southwestern Korean Peninsula. The names Ōmi and Lake Biwa do not appear in the Kojiki, Man'yōshū or other ancient documents.

The Yamato state ruled briefly from this region. In the late Asuka period (538-710), Emperor Tenji (r. 626 – January 7, 672) built Ōmi Ōtsu Palace in what is now the city of Ōtsu and ruled from it from 667 until 672. He issued the first legal code, the Ōmi Code, while ruling from the Ōmi Ōtsu Palace. After his death, the Jinshin War broke out among his fourteen children, one of the largest conflicts in Japanese history. Ōmi was the site of several battles, and afterwards, the capital returned to Asuka.

In the subsequent Nara period, during the reign of Emperor Shōmu (September 22, 701 – June 4, 756), the new Ritsuryō system established a kokufu (provincial capital) at Ōmi Kokuchō in Ōtsu, near the ruins of the former Ōmi Ōtsu Palace. He also established a provincial temple there. In 740, Emperor Shōmu built a personal residence, called Rakumura, in what is now Kōka, Shiga. He declared it the new capital in 745 and renamed it Shigaraki Palace, but abandoned it the same year due to expenses.

Takebe taisha, enshrining Yamato Takeru and his relics and Ōkuninushi, was designated as the ichinomiya (chief shrine) for the province.

During the Heian period (794-1195), the proximity of Ōmi to the capital at Heian-kyō, its location on the Tōkaidō and Nakasendō highways connecting the capital with eastern Japan, and the main route from the capital to the Sea of Japan, all gave the province great strategic importance. With the spread of Buddhism in Japan, Saichō founded the great Tendai monastery of Enryaku-ji in 788 on Mount Hiei in Ōmi.

From the late Heian into the Kamakura period, the Sasaki clan controlled the post of shugo (military governor) of Ōmi Province, and two cadet branches, the Rokkaku and Kyōgoku, dominated the province into the Muromachi period.

In the tumultuous Sengoku period, internal struggles weakened both clans. Northern Ōmi became a battleground between the Azai and Asakura clans. In the south, the Rokkaku were supported by the Kōka ikki, whose shinobi operatives were infamous. In the late 1560s and early 1570s, Oda Nobunaga invaded from the east, defeating the Azai, Asakura, Rokkaku, Kōka, and finally, in 1573, the Ashikaga shogunate itself. Nobunaga built Azuchi Castle near the southwestern side of Lake Biwa in Ōmi, from which he planned to rule all of Japan and beyond.

After Nobunaga was assassinated at Honnō-ji on 21 June 1582, Toyotomi Hideyoshi awarded much of the province to Ishida Mitsunari. Mitsunari would later be Tokugawa Ieyasu's archrival at the Battle of Sekigahara on October 21, 1600.

After the establishment of the Tokugawa shogunate in 1603, much of the province was divided into several feudal domains, the largest of which was Hikone Domain, ruled by the Ii clan. Ōmi continued to serve as a transportation conduit, with five of the 53 Stations of the Tōkaidō and eight of the 69 Stations of the Nakasendō.

Following the Meiji Restoration, on November 22, 1871, Ōtsu Prefecture and Nagahama Prefecture were created from former tenryō and hatamoto territories within the province, and each former domain formed its own prefecture. These were merged on January 19, 1872 to form Shiga Prefecture. From August 21, 1876 to February 7, 1881, the Reinan region of Fukui Prefecture (west of Tsuruga, Fukui) was part of Shiga Prefecture, thus giving it a shoreline on the Sea of Japan. Local inhabitants strongly opposed the merger, and it was withdrawn.

== Historical districts ==
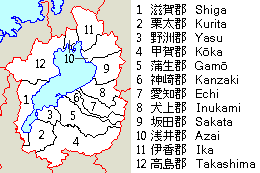

Ōmi was divided into 12 Districts (郡), which were further subdivided into 93 counties (郷), containing 1,597 villages. The total assessed value of the province in terms of kokudaka was 858,618 koku.

- Azai District (浅井郡)
  - Higashiazai District (東浅井郡) – dissolved
  - Nishiazai District (西浅井郡) – merged into Ika District on April 1, 1897
- Echi District (愛知郡)
- Gamō District (蒲生郡)
- Ika District (伊香郡) – absorbed Nishiazai District on April 1, 1897; now dissolved
- Inukami District (犬上郡)
- Kanzaki District (神崎郡) – dissolved
- Kōka District (甲賀郡) – dissolved
- Kurita District (栗太郡) – dissolved
- Sakata District (坂田郡) – dissolved
- Shiga District (滋賀郡) – dissolved
- Takashima District (高島郡) – dissolved
- Yasu District (野洲郡) – dissolved

== Edo-period Domains ==
List of the domains of Ōmi Province
Name	Capital	Ruling clan and kokudaka
Hikone Domain	Sawayama Castle (1600- 1606); Hikone Castle (1606- 1871)	Ii clan (1600 - 1871, 180,000→150,000→200,000→250,000→300,000 (350,000→200,000→230,000)
Zeze Domain	Zeze Castle	Toda clan (1601 - 1616, 30,000 koku); Honda clan (1616 - 1621, 30,000 koku); Suganuma clan (1621-1634, 31,000 koku); Ishikawa clan (1634 - 1651, 70,000→ 53,000 koku); Honda clan (1651 - 1871 , 70,000 koku)
Minakuchi Domain	Minakuchi Castle	Kato clan (1682 - 1695, 20,000 koku); Torii clan (1695 - 1712, 20,000 koku); Kato clan (1712 - 1871, 25,000 koku)
Ōmizo Domain	Ōmizo jin'ya	Wakebe clan (1619- 1871, 20,000 koku)
Nisshōji Domain	Nisshōji jin'ya	Ichihashi clan (1620 - 1871, 20,000→18,000→17,000 koku)
Yamakami Domain	Yamakami jin'ya	Ando clan (1604 - 1695, 10,000 koku); Inagaki clan, (1698 - 1871, 13,000 koku)
Ōmi-Miyagawa Domain	Miyagawa jin'ya	Hotta clan (1698 - 1871, 10,000→13,000)
Mikami Domain	Mikami jinya	Endo clan (1698 - 1870, 10,000→12,000 koku)
Katata Domain	Katata jin'ya	Hotta clan (1698 - 1826, 10,000→13,000 koku); Transferred to Shimotsuke Sano Domain
Kutsuki Domain	Kutsuki jin'ya	Kutsuki clan (1636 - 1648, 10,000 koku) transferred to Shimotsuke Kanuma Domain
Ōmori Domain	Ōmori jin'ya	Mogami clan (1622 - 1632, 10,000 koku) attainder
Ōmi-Takashima Domain		Sakuma clan (1600 - 1616, 15,000→20,000 koku) transfer to Shinano Iiyama domain, later attainder
Ōmi-Komuro Domain	Komuro jin'ya	Kobori clan (1619 -1788, 12,460→11,460→16,300 koku) attainder due to mismanagement

== Other websites ==
Media related to Omi Province at Wikimedia Commons

- Murdoch's map of provinces, 1903
