= Masayoshi Takemura =

Japanese politician (1934–2022)

- 武村 正義
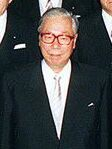
- Takemura in 1995

Minister of Finance
- In office 30 June 1994 – 11 January 1996
- Prime Minister: Tomiichi Murayama
- Preceded by: Hirohisa Fujii
- Succeeded by: Wataru Kubo

Chief Cabinet Secretary
- In office 9 August 1993 – 28 April 1994
- Prime Minister: Morihiro Hosokawa
- Preceded by: Yōhei Kōno
- Succeeded by: Hiroshi Kumagai

Member of the House of Representatives
- In office 6 July 1986 – 2 June 2000
- Preceded by: Hiroyoshi Sezaki
- Succeeded by: Akira Konishi
- Constituency: Shiga at-large (1986–1996); Shiga 2nd (1996–2000)

Governor of Shiga Prefecture
- In office 7 December 1974 – 16 June 1986
- Monarch: Hirohito
- Preceded by: Kinichiro Nozaki
- Succeeded by: Minoru Inaba

Mayor of Yōkaichi
- In office April 1971 – October 1974
- Preceded by: Nishizawa Kyuemon
- Succeeded by: Masajiro Yamada

Personal details
- Born: 26 August 1934 Gamō, Shiga, Japan
- Died: 28 September 2022 (aged 88) Ōtsu, Shiga, Japan
- Party: New Party Sakigake (1993–1998)
- Other political affiliations: LDP (before 1993); DPJ (after 1998)
- Education: Nagoya University; University of Tokyo

Masayoshi Takemura (武村 正義, Takemura Masayoshi; 26 August 1934 – 28 September 2022) was a Japanese politician. Elected as a representative of the Liberal Democratic Party, in 1993 he broke away to form New Party Sakigake, before joining the newly formed Democratic Party of Japan in 1998. He served as Chief Cabinet Secretary and then finance minister in the Murayama Cabinet of the mid-1990s.

== Early life ==
Takemura was born in Gamō District in Shiga Prefecture to a family of farmers. Initially studying engineering at Nagoya University, he graduated from University of Tokyo studying education and finance. He began his professional life as a bureaucrat in the home affairs ministry.

== Political career ==
After leaving the ministry, he was elected mayor of Yōkaichi in Shiga Prefecture, and then became the governor of Shiga Prefecture and served in the post from 1974 to 1986. He was elected to the Lower House in 1986 as a representative of the Liberal Democratic Party. In 1993 he split from the LDP to found the New Party Sakigake.

He took part in the coalition government of Morihiro Hosokawa as chief cabinet secretary. Then he was appointed finance minister in the coalition cabinet led by Prime Minister Tomiichi Murayama in July 1994.

Described as "blunt, pragmatic and outspoken", his confrontational tenure at the finance ministry led Euromoney to describe him as "The worst finance minister of the year" for 1995. It has been speculated that his confrontational attitude towards the officials of the Ministry of Finance stem from the manner in which the Hosokawa government fell apart over the introduction of consumption tax, with Ministry of Finance Officials conspiring with Hosokawa to keep coalitions partners in the dark over their plans.

House of Representatives (Japan)
Preceded by Sōsuke Uno; Ganri Yamashita; Kōichi Noguchi; Hiroyoshi Sezaki; Hachirō Nishida	Member of the House of Representatives from Shiga At-large district 1986–1996; Served alongside: Tatsuo Kawabata, Ganri Yamashita, Sōsuke Uno, Tsutomu Yamamoto, Kōichi Noguchi, Hachirō Nishida	Introduction of single-member districts and proportional seats
New district	Member of the House of Representatives from Shiga 2nd district (single-member); 1996–2000	Succeeded by Akira Konishi
Political offices
Preceded by Ken'ichirō Nozaki	Governor of Shiga; 1974–1986	Succeeded by Minoru Inaba
Preceded by Hirohisa Fujii	Minister of Finance of Japan; 1994–1996	Succeeded by Wataru Kubo
Preceded by Yōhei Kōno	Chief Cabinet Secretary; 1993–1994	Succeeded by Hiroshi Kumagai
