= Aishō, Shiga =

Aishō 愛荘町
- Town
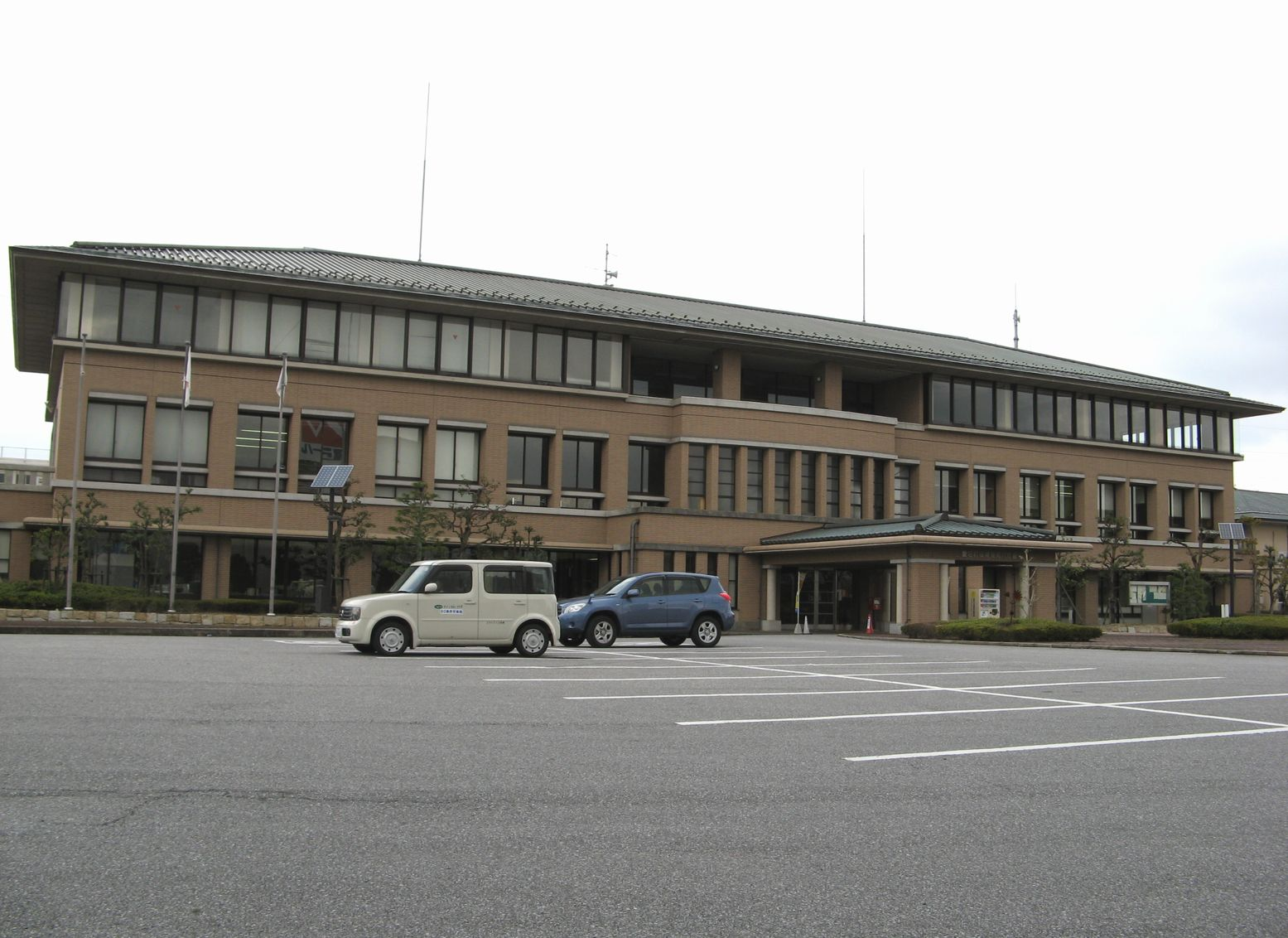
- Aishō town hall

- Flag Emblem

- Location of Aishō in Shiga Prefecture

- Location in Japan
- Coordinates: 35°10′N 136°13′E
- Country: Japan
- Region: Kansai
- Prefecture: Shiga Prefecture
- District: Echi

Government
  - Mayor: Kunitomo Arimura

Area
  - Total: 37.97 km^{2} (14.66 sq mi)

Population (August 1, 2021)
  - Total: 21,411
  - Density: 563.9/km^{2} (1,460/sq mi)
- Time zone: UTC+09:00 (JST)
- City hall address: 72, Echigawa, Aishō-chō, Echi-gun, Shiga-ken 529-1380
- Phone number: 0749-42-4111
- Website: www.town.aisho.shiga.jp
- Symbols
- Flower: Cherry blossom
- Tree: Acer palmatum

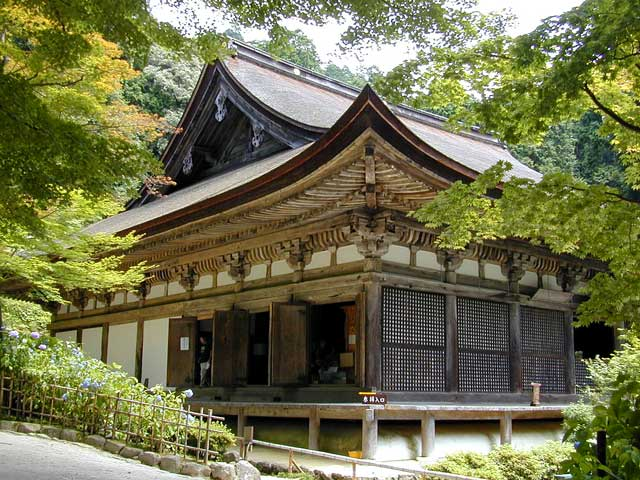
Kongōrin-ji Hondō, a National Treasure

Aishō (愛荘町, Aishō-chō) is a town located in Echi District in eastern Shiga Prefecture, Japan. As of 1 July 2021, the town had an estimated population of 21,411 in 8310 households and a population density of 940 persons per km^{2}. The total area of the town is 37.97 square kilometres (14.66 sq mi).

== Geography ==
Aishō is located in east-central Shiga Prefecture in the flatlands of the Ōmi Basin.

=== Surrounding municipalities ===
Shiga Prefecture

- Hikone
- Higashiōmi
- Kōra
- Taga
- Toyosato

=== Climate ===
Aishō has a humid subtropical climate (Köppen Cfa) characterized by warm summers and cool winters with light to no snowfall. The average annual temperature in Aishō is 12.9 °C. The average annual rainfall is 1810 mm with September as the wettest month. The temperatures are highest on average in August, at around 24.7 °C, and lowest in January, at around 1.3 °C.

== Demographics ==
Per Japanese census data, the population of Aishō has grown slightly over the past 50 years.

Historical population
Year	Pop.	±%
1920	15,444	—
1930	15,237	−1.3%
1940	14,501	−4.8%
1950	18,649	+28.6%
1960	16,685	−10.5%
1970	16,526	−1.0%
1980	17,034	+3.1%
1990	17,036	+0.0%
2000	18,992	+11.5%
2010	20,118	+5.9%
2020	20,893	+3.9%

== History ==
The area of Aishō was part of ancient Ōmi Province. During the Edo period, Echigawa-juku was the 65th post station on the Nakasendō highway connecting Kyoto with eastern Japan. The village of Echigawa was established on April 1, 1889, with the establishment of the modern municipalities system. It was raised to town status on October 1, 1909, and merged with the neighboring village of Toyokuni in 1955. The town of Aishō was founded on February 13, 2006, when the towns of Echigawa and Hatashō merged. The name "Aishō" combines the first character in "Echigawa" (愛知川) and the second character in "Hatashō" (秦荘).

== Government ==
Aishō has a mayor-council form of government with a directly elected mayor and a unicameral city council of 14 members. Aishō contributes one member to the Shiga Prefectural Assembly. In terms of national politics, the town is part of Shiga 2nd district of the lower house of the Diet of Japan.

== Economy ==
Agriculture has dominated the local economy since ancient times. Manufacturing includes a number of small to medium-sized food processing and metals processing factories.

== Education ==
Aishō has four public elementary schools and two public middle schools operated by the town government, and one public high school operated by the Shiga Prefectural Board of Education. The prefecture also operates one special education school for the handicapped.

International schools

- Colégio Sant'Ana - Brazilian school

== Transportation ==
=== Railway ===
Ohmi Railway – Main Line

- Echigawa

=== Highway ===
- Meishin Expressway
- National Route 8
- National Route 307

== Sister cities ==
- West Bend, Wisconsin, United States

== Local attractions ==
- Kongōrin-ji, a major Tendai Buddhist temple

== Noted people from Aishō ==
- Yasujirō Tsutsumi, entrepreneur and politician
