= Kei Orihara =

Japanese photographer

Kei Orihara (折原 恵, Orihara Kei; born 1948) is a Japanese photographer whose work has portrayed the United States and who has created photobooks for children.

== Life and career ==
Orihara was born in 1948 in Shimonoseki, Yamaguchi Prefecture, Japan. She had studied at the Faculty of Letters of Chuo University (Tokyo), and became keen on photography via a photography club there. After graduation, she worked for some time in publishing before setting out in 1977 as a freelance photographer, concentrating on magazine work, for which routine assignments included photographs of people being interviewed for magazines, and portraits of poets for the magazine Gendai-shi techō (現代詩手帖).

Orihara held her first solo exhibition, Soul South, in 1977. An early project was of people sitting in Tokyo trains. From 1979 to 1981 she lived in New York City, where she became close friends with a model named Jana; photographs of Jana's everyday life were exhibited in Japan in 1982, turned into a feature within the Japanese edition of Playboy, (Note: Playboy Japan, January 1983; as "Christmas Tree Stand" (「クリスマスツリースタンド」), and 「Playboy ドキュメント・ファイル大賞特別優秀作品」.) and into a book (Jana: The New York Girl) published in 1984. This was notable both for being a woman's portrait of a woman and for Orihara's free discussion in the texts of her perceptions of the differences and similarities between her model and herself.

In 1984 Orihara was noted for her success in interior portraits with natural and ambient light; she avoided flash.

Various photography exhibitions followed, while Orihara's major work was portrait photography for magazines, for example accompanying a series written by Amy Yamada in Men's Non-no. In 2000 she was living in Tokyo.

In 1999 Orihara published Photo Love, a book of her writing about life as a photographer, illustrated with photographs. It appeared during something of a boom in photography among young people; but Orihara had noted that the concerns of many of the young photographers were private, and she hoped to encourage people to see photography as a tool with which they could relate to other people and to society.

In keeping with Orihara's interest in people who at first seemed different from herself, she took on projects on young, third-generation Koreans in Japan, and people at a Roman Catholic church in Sotome, Nagasaki Prefecture.

Orihara turned to townscapes, photographing the port cities of Kobe, Kita-Kyūshū and Hakodate, and the rooftop water towers of New York City (especially those of the traditional, barrel-like construction); the latter appeared both for adults interested in photography and as a photobook for children.

From 2004 until 2010, Orihara lived in Athens, Georgia; she then moved to New York. From July 2011 until March 2016, she ran a photoblog of scenes in and near Sunnyside, Queens.

== Exhibitions ==
- Soul South. 1977.
- Jana (ジャナ). Minolta Photo Space, Tokyo, July 1982.
- Gogo no jōkyaku (午後の乗客). 1984.
- Homeless Town. 1989.
- Fukkatsu no mura (復活の村). Ginza Nikon Salon, November–December 1993.
- Water Towers. Konica Plaza, Tokyo, November 2002.
- Nyūyōku: Kyūsuitō no aru fūkei (ニューヨーク／給水塔のある風景) / Water Towers New York. Echigawamachi Bintemari no kan (Echigawa, Shiga), October–November 2003.
- Water Towers New York. Kyōmachi Gallery Yamada (Kyoto), January–February 2004.

== Collections ==
Eleven photographs by Orihara of the Jana series and seven of the Gogo no jōkyaku (午後の乗客, afternoon passengers) series are in the collection of the Tokyo Metropolitan Museum of Photography.

== Books ==
=== Books by Orihara ===
- Jana: The New York girl (ジャナ The New York girl). Tokyo: Shueisha, 1983. ISBN 4087724573. Photobook, with essays, about a girl in New York, Atlanta, and Half Moon Bay. (in Japanese)
- Tai: Mana to midori no taichi (タイ マナと緑の大地). Sekai no kodomo-tachi, 24. Tokyo: Kaisei-sha, 1988. A book for younger readers about children in Thailand. (in Japanese)
  - Thailand. Children of the World. Text by David K. Wright and MaryLee Knowlton. Milwaukee: Stevens, 1988. ISBN 1555322239. English version of the above. (in English)
  - T'ai: Menam e hŭrŭnŭn Mana ŭi kkum. Segye ŭi ŏrini 24. Seoul: Ungjin Ch'ulp'an Chusik Hoesa, 1991. Korean version of the above. (in Korean)
- Foto rabu (フォト ラブ) / Photo Love. Tokyo: Gentōsha, 1999. ISBN 4877282742. Book of essays about a life and career in photography. (in Japanese)
- Me ni shōgai no aru ko to issho ni (目に障害のある子といっしょに). Baria-furī no hon, 1. Text by Tsuneyuki Takeuchi (竹内恒之). Tokyo: Kaisei-sha, 2000. ISBN 978-4-03-543210-4. Book for younger readers about blind people. (in Japanese)
- Shōgai no aru hito e no borantia katsudō (障害のある人へのボランティア活動). Baria-furī no hon, 9. Text by Toshiyuki Takizawa (瀧澤利行). Tokyo: Kaisei-sha, 2000. ISBN 978-4-03-543290-6. Book for younger readers about volunteer work for the disabled. (in Japanese)
- "Shōgai"-tte nan darō? (「障害」ってなんだろう?). Baria-furī no hon, 10. Text by Masako Fujita (藤田雅子) and Eishi Yukumi (湯汲英史); photographs by Kei Orihara and others. Tokyo: Kaisei-sha, 2000. ISBN 978-4-03-543300-2. Book for younger readers about disabilities. (in Japanese)
- Okujō no tongari bōshi (屋上のとんがり帽子) / Water Tanks in New York. September 2002 issue of the magazine Gekkan Takusan no fushigi (月刊たくさんのふしぎ). Tokyo: Fukuinkan Shoten, 2002. Reissued within the series Takusan no fushigi kessakushū. Tokyo: Fukuinkan Shoten, 2008. ISBN 978-4-8340-2300-8. Photographs and text by Orihara. For younger readers. About the rooftop water towers of New York City. (in Japanese) (Note: The title literally means "pointed hats on the roof", as many of the water tanks shown have conical covers. In the 2008 edition, the title "Water Tanks in New York" only appears, inconspicuously, in the colophon.)

=== Other books with work by Orihara ===
- Joel Sackett, ed. Ten on Tokyo: An Exhibition of Leading Japanese Photographers. Los Angeles: Perpetua Press, 1988.
