= Higashiōmi =

Higashiōmi 東近江市
- City
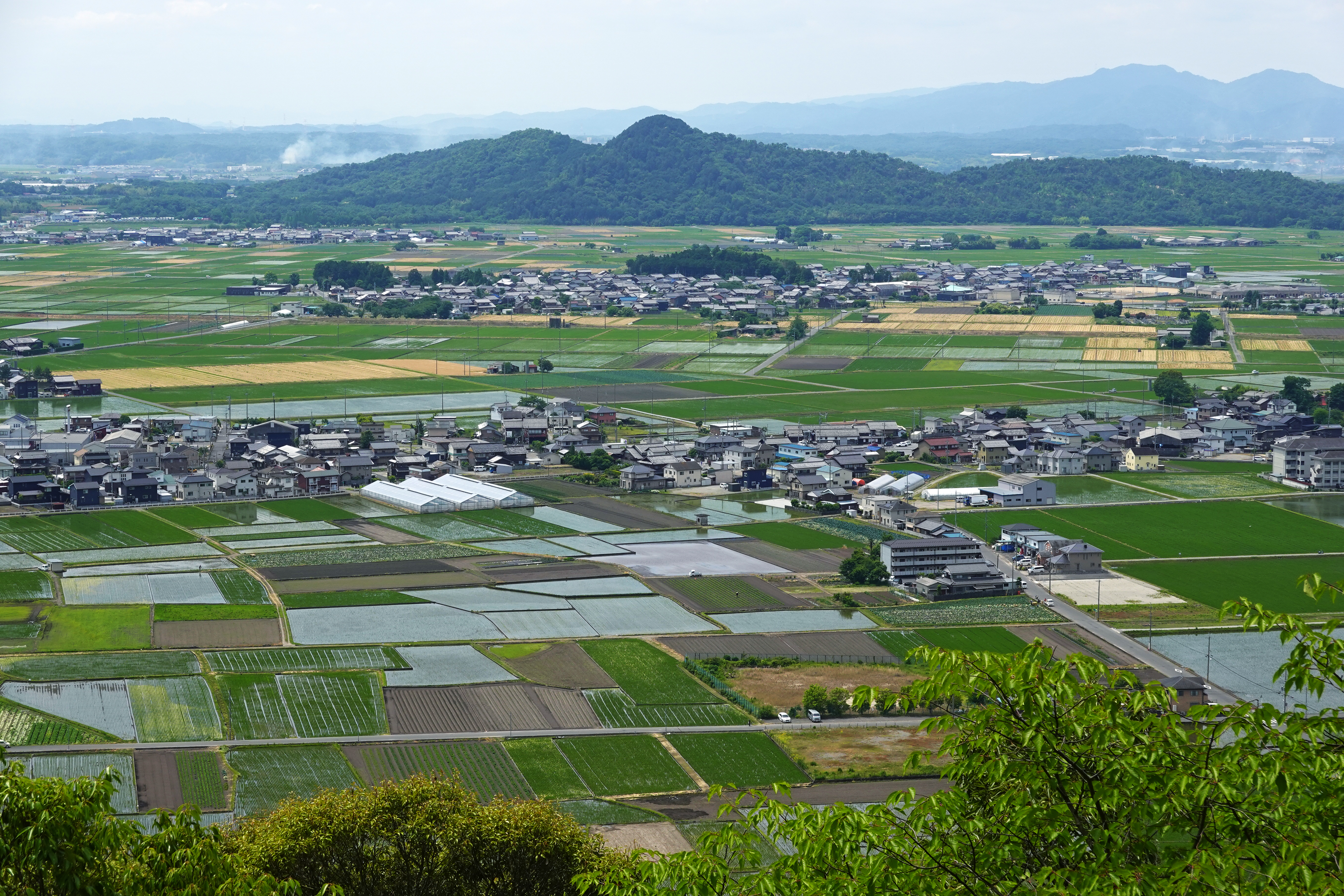
- A view from Aga-jinja

- Flag Emblem

- Location of Higashiōmi in Shiga Prefecture

- Location in Japan
- Coordinates: 35°7′N 136°12′E
- Country: Japan
- Region: Kansai
- Prefecture: Shiga

Government
  - Mayor: Masakiyo Ogura

Area
  - Total: 388.37 km^{2} (149.95 sq mi)

Population (September 1, 2021)
  - Total: 113,229
  - Density: 291.55/km^{2} (755.11/sq mi)
- Time zone: UTC+09:00 (JST)
- City hall address: 10-5, Yōkaichi Midorimachi, Higashiōmi-shi, Shiga-ken 527-8527
- Phone number: 0749-30-6111
- Climate: Cfa
- Website: Official website
- Symbols
- Flower: Purple Gromwell
- Tree: Japanese Maple

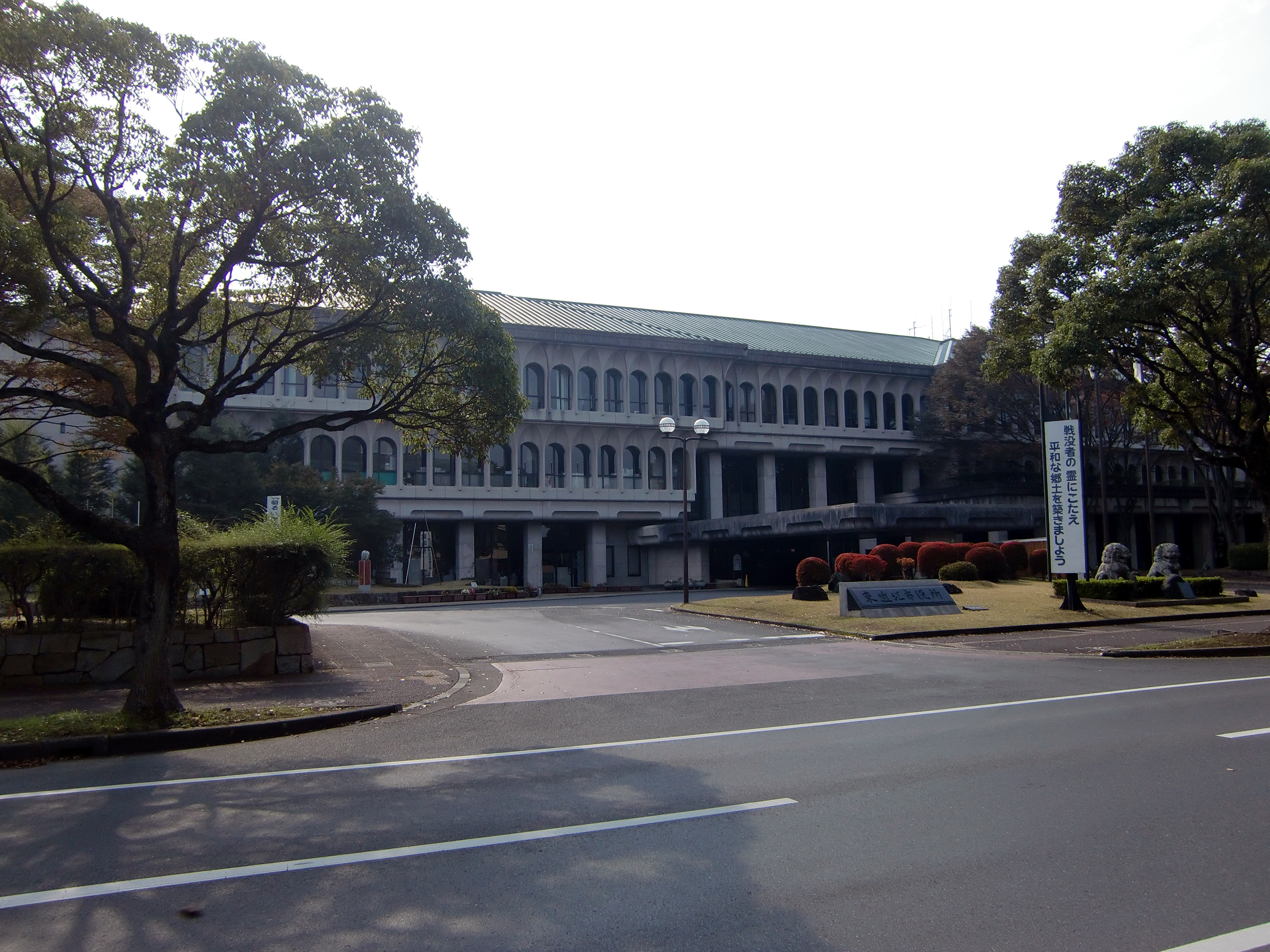
Higashiomi City Hall

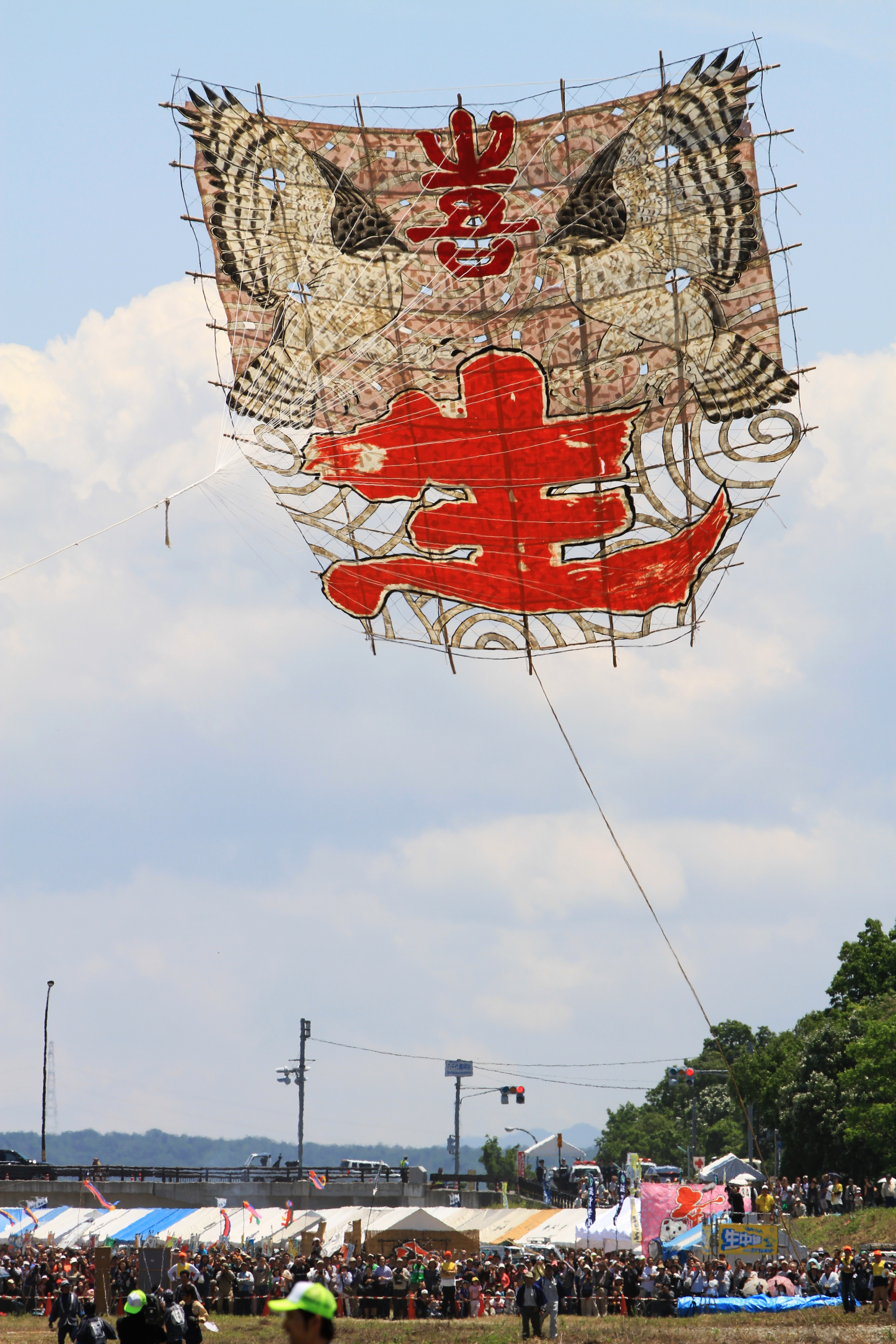
Yōkaichi Kite Festival

Higashiōmi (東近江市, Higashiōmi-shi) is a city located in Shiga Prefecture, Japan. As of 1 September 2021, the city had an estimated population of 113,229 in 45,771 households and a population density of 290 persons per km^{2}. The total area of the city is 388.58 square kilometres (150.03 sq mi).

== Geography ==
Higashiōmi is located in east-central Shiga Prefecture, with a small shoreline the eastern shore of Lake Biwa, and extending inland to the Suzuka Mountains and the border with Mie Prefecture. Parts of the city are within the borders of the Suzuka Quasi-National Park.

=== Neighboring municipalities ===
Mie Prefecture

- Inabe
- Komono

Shiga Prefecture

- Aishō
- Hikone
- Hino
- Kōka
- Ōmihachiman
- Ryūō
- Taga

=== Climate ===
Higashiōmi has a humid subtropical climate (Köppen Cfa) characterized by warm summers and cool winters with light to no snowfall. The average annual temperature in Higashiōmi is 12.7 °C. The average annual rainfall is 1673 mm with September as the wettest month. The temperatures are highest on average in August, at around 24.5 °C, and lowest in January, at around 1.1 °C. The highest recorded temperature was 38.8 °C (July 26, 2014) and the lowest was -11.6 °C (January 31, 1982).

Climate data for Higashiōmi (1991−2020 normals, extremes 1978−present)
Month	Jan	Feb	Mar	Apr	May	Jun	Jul	Aug	Sep	Oct	Nov	Dec	Year
Record high °C (°F)	16.6 (61.9)	20.6 (69.1)	24.9 (76.8)	30.4 (86.7)	33.8 (92.8)	36.0 (96.8)	38.8 (101.8)	39.2 (102.6)	36.9 (98.4)	33.2 (91.8)	25.0 (77.0)	23.5 (74.3)	39.2 (102.6)
Mean daily maximum °C (°F)	7.6 (45.7)	8.4 (47.1)	12.6 (54.7)	18.6 (65.5)	23.5 (74.3)	26.8 (80.2)	30.9 (87.6)	32.5 (90.5)	28.0 (82.4)	22.2 (72.0)	16.3 (61.3)	10.5 (50.9)	19.8 (67.6)
Daily mean °C (°F)	3.1 (37.6)	3.5 (38.3)	7.0 (44.6)	12.4 (54.3)	17.7 (63.9)	21.7 (71.1)	25.7 (78.3)	26.7 (80.1)	22.8 (73.0)	16.7 (62.1)	10.7 (51.3)	5.5 (41.9)	14.5 (58.0)
Mean daily minimum °C (°F)	−0.8 (30.6)	−0.7 (30.7)	1.7 (35.1)	6.5 (43.7)	12.3 (54.1)	17.3 (63.1)	21.7 (71.1)	22.4 (72.3)	18.5 (65.3)	11.9 (53.4)	5.6 (42.1)	1.2 (34.2)	9.8 (49.6)
Record low °C (°F)	−11.6 (11.1)	−10.8 (12.6)	−7.6 (18.3)	−2.7 (27.1)	2.3 (36.1)	6.5 (43.7)	13.2 (55.8)	12.9 (55.2)	6.8 (44.2)	0.0 (32.0)	−2.9 (26.8)	−10.0 (14.0)	−11.6 (11.1)
Average precipitation mm (inches)	77.7 (3.06)	82.2 (3.24)	105.8 (4.17)	102.9 (4.05)	130.7 (5.15)	181.0 (7.13)	181.7 (7.15)	123.1 (4.85)	167.0 (6.57)	142.0 (5.59)	74.4 (2.93)	72.0 (2.83)	1,440.5 (56.71)
Average precipitation days (≥ 1.0 mm)	11.3	11.7	11.7	10.4	10.2	11.8	12.3	8.6	10.4	9.5	8.6	10.6	127.1
Mean monthly sunshine hours	106.0	114.1	154.6	175.5	186.3	135.2	152.7	201.0	149.4	151.0	136.4	119.2	1,781.3
Source: Japan Meteorological Agency

== Demographics ==
Per Japanese census data, the population of Higashiōmi has recently plateaued after several decades of growth.

Historical population
Year	Pop.	±%
1950	93,357	—
1960	86,945	−6.9%
1970	85,214	−2.0%
1980	98,664	+15.8%
1990	106,509	+8.0%
2000	114,395	+7.4%
2010	115,479	+0.9%
2020	112,819	−2.3%

== History ==
Higashiōmi is part of ancient Ōmi Province. Portions of the area were under the control of Yamakami Domain, a 13,000 koku fudai territory during the Edo period Tokugawa shogunate. With the creation of the modern municipalities system on April 1, 1889, the town of Yōkaichi was established within Gamō District, Shiga. Yōkaichi merged with the villages of Hirata, Ichinobe, and Tamano in Gamō District, and Misono and Takebe from Kanzaki District and was elevated to city status on August 15, 1954. The city of Higashiōmi was established on February 11, 2005, from the merger of Yōkaichi with the towns of Eigenji and Gokashō (both from Kanzaki District), and the towns of Aitō and Kotō (both from Echi District).

On January 1, 2006, the town of Notogawa (from Kanzaki District), and the town of Gamō (from Gamō District) were merged into Higashiōmi.

== Government ==
Higashiōmi has a mayor-council form of government with a directly elected mayor and a unicameral city council of 25 members. Higashiōmi, together with the town of Ryūō, contributes three members to the Shiga Prefectural Assembly. In terms of national politics, the city is part of Shiga 2nd district of the lower house of the Diet of Japan, and is represented by Kenichiro Ueno.

== Economy ==
The economy of Higashiōmi is centered on agriculture and light manufacturing. There are several industrial parks in the city. Murata Manufacturing, Kyocera, Panasonic, Suntory and Toppan have large factories in the city.

== Education ==
Higashiōmi has 22 public elementary schools and ten public middle schools operated by the city government. There are five public high schools operated by the Shiga Prefectural Department of Education. The prefecture also operates one special education school for the handicapped. The Biwako-Gakuin University, a private's university with associated junior college, is also located in Higashiōmi.

== Transportation ==
=== Railway ===
JR West – Biwako Line

- Notogawa

Ohmi Railway – Main Line

- Gokashō - Kawabe-no-mori - Yōkaichi - Nagatanino - Daigaku-mae - Kyocera-mae - Sakuragawa - Asahi Ōtsuka - Asahino

Ohmi Railway – Yōkaichi Line

- Yōkaichi - Shin-Yōkaichi - Tarōbōgū-mae - Ichinobe - Hirata

=== Highway ===
- Meishin Expressway
- National Route 8
- National Route 307
- National Route 421
- National Route 477

== Local attractions ==
- Eigen-ji, noted Rinzai Zen temple
- Hyakusai-ji, noted Tendai temple, National Historic Site
- Yōkaichi Kite Festival
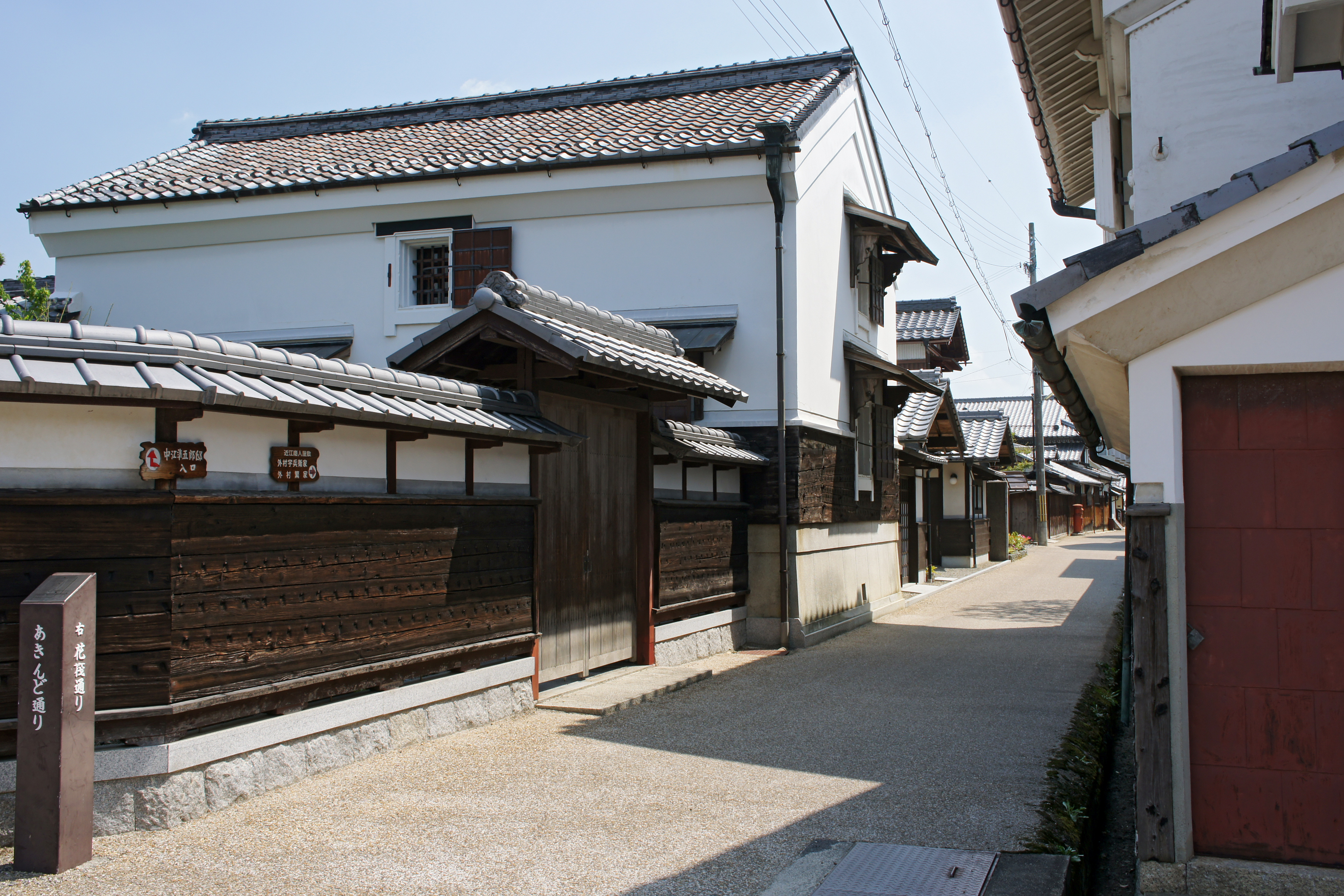
Kondo-cho, Gokasho

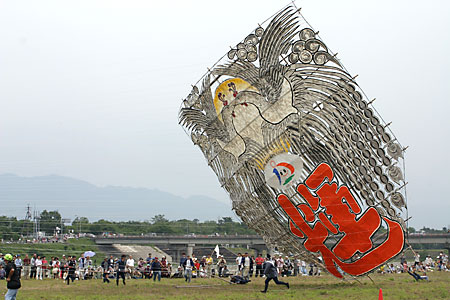
Yōkaichi Giant Kite Festival held in May

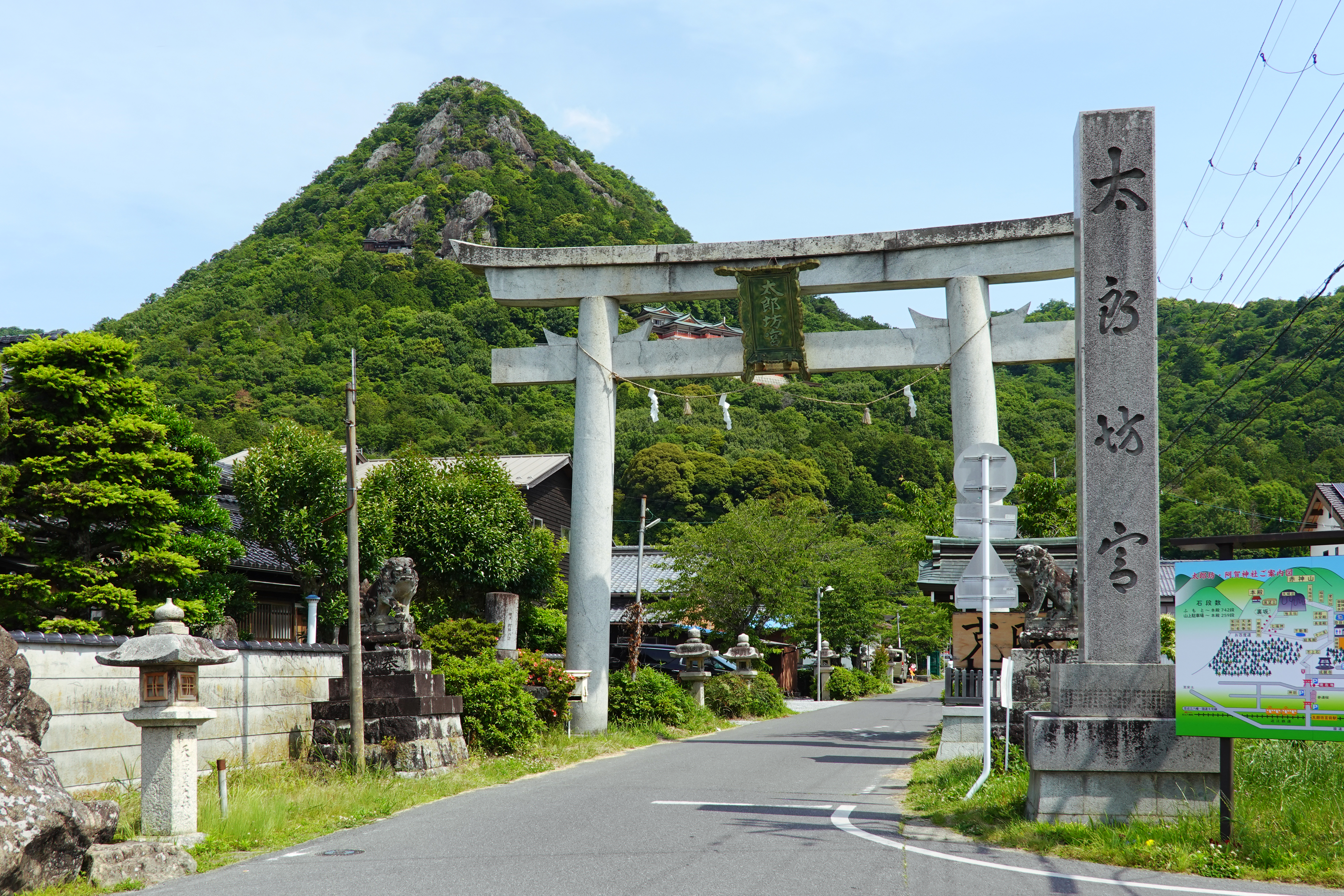
Aga-jinja Shrine or Tarobogu Shrine

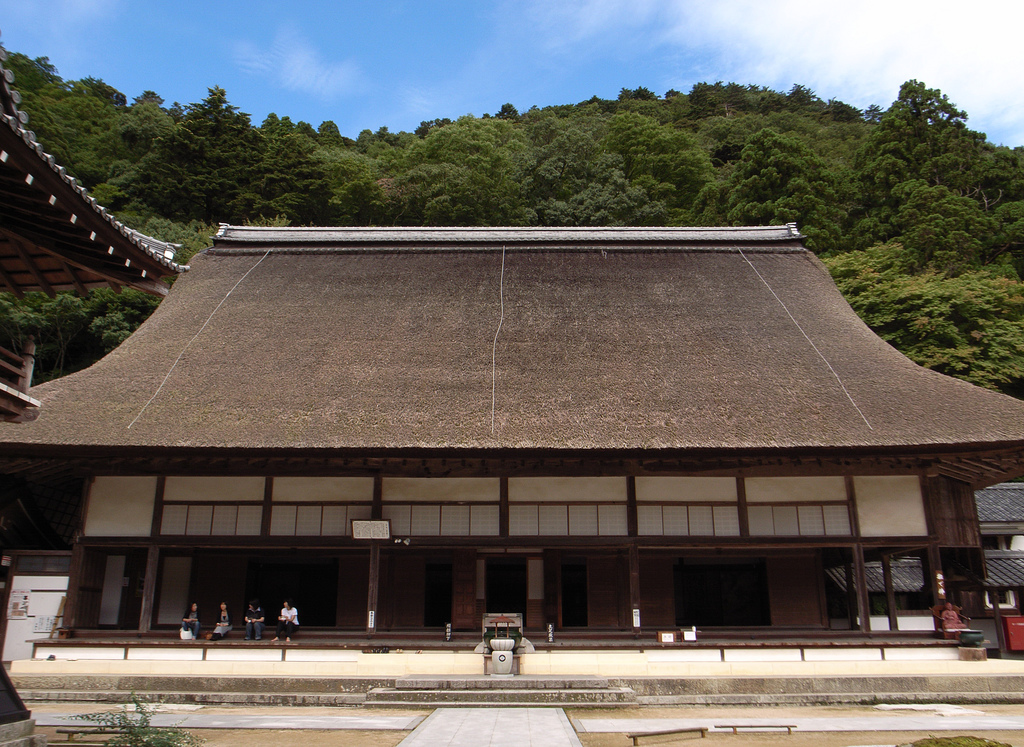
Eigen-ji Temple

== Sister cities ==
Higashiōmi maintains the following sister city relationships.

- Changde, Hunan, China, since August 15, 1994
- Jangam-myeon, Chungcheongnam-do, South Korea, since November 2, 1992
- Marquette, Michigan, United States, since August 13, 1979, renewed 2005
- Rättvik, Dalarna County, Sweden, since November 1, 1994
- Taber, Alberta, Canada, since March 27, 1981
- Tongyeong, Gyeongsangnam-do, South Korea, since May 26, 2001

== Noted people from Higashiōmi ==
- Tadayoshi Ichida, politician
- Mitsunori Okamoto, politician
- Masayoshi Takemura, politician
