= Notogawa, Shiga =

Dissolved municipality in Shiga prefecture, Japan

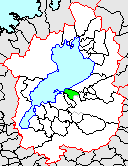
Location of Notogawa

Giant water wheel, the symbol of Notogawa.

Notogawa (能登川町, Notogawa-chō) was a town located in Kanzaki District, Shiga Prefecture, Japan.

== Population ==
As of 2005, the town had an estimated population of 23,385 and a density of 751.45 persons per km^{2}. The total area is 31.12 km^{2}.

== Transport links ==
Notogawa Station (Location: N35.179899, E136.165913) is the only Japan Railway station in Higashiomi. The station is a rapid stop on the JR Biwako Line, located between stations in Omi-Hachiman to the east and Hikone to the west. The town shares a small border with Lake Biwa to the northwest.

== Merge ==
On January 1, 2006, Notogawa, along with the town of Gamō (from Gamō District), was merged into the expanded city of Higashiōmi.

== Sister town ==
- Taber, Alberta, Canada.
