= Echigawa, Shiga =

Dissolved municipality in Shiga prefecture, Japan

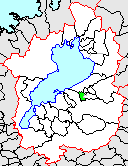
Location of Echigawa

Echigawa (愛知川町, Echigawa-chō) was a town located in Echi District, Shiga Prefecture, Japan. It developed as Echigawa-juku in Edo period.

As of 2003, the town had an estimated population of 11,411 and a density of 881.84 persons per km^{2}. The total area was 12.94 km^{2}.

On February 13, 2006, Echigawa, along with the town of Hatashō (also from Echi District), was merged to create the town of Aishō.

== Sister city ==
- West Bend, Wisconsin, United States
