= Hatashō, Shiga =

Dissolved municipality in Shiga prefecture, Japan

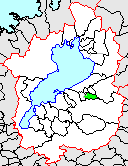
Location of Hatasho

Hatashō (秦荘町, Hatashō-chō) was a town located in Echi District, Shiga Prefecture, Japan.

As of 2003, the town had an estimated population of 7,964 and a density of 318.05 persons per km^{2}. The total area was 25.04 km^{2}.

On February 13, 2006, Hatashō, along with the town of Echigawa (also from Echi District), was merged to create the town of Aishō.
