= Gokashō, Shiga =

Dissolved municipality in Shiga prefecture, Japan

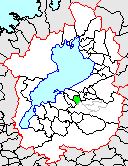
Location of Gokasho

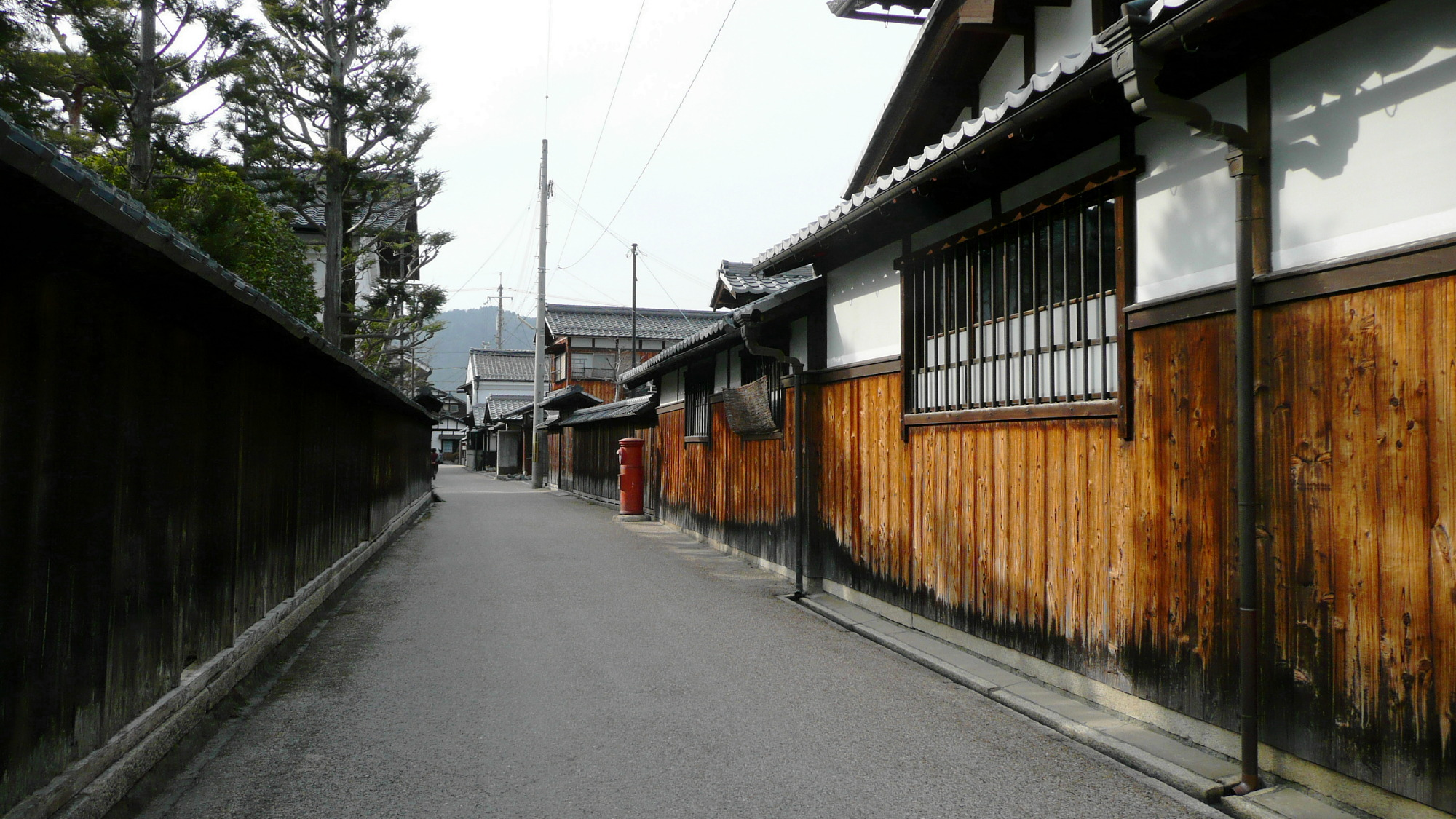
An old street in Kondō area

Gokashō (五個荘町, Gokashō-chō) was a town located in Kanzaki District, Shiga Prefecture, Japan.

== Population ==
As of 2003, the town had an estimated population of 11,984 and a density of 736.12 persons per km^{2}. The total area was 16.28 km^{2}.

== Geography ==
On February 11, 2005, Gokashō, along with the city of Yōkaichi, the town of Eigenji (also from Kanzaki District), and the towns of Aitō and Kotō (both from Echi District), was merged to create the city of Higashiōmi.

From Edo period until Shōwa period, Gokashō produced many merchants; for example, a founder of Wacoal. Even now, their country houses are kept around Gokashō, particularly Kondō area designated as Important Preservation Districts for Groups of Traditional Buildings. Shigeru Tonomura wrote novels about life of Gokasho merchants.

== Access ==
- Ohmi Railway Main Line Gokashō Station
- Ohmi Railway Bus Line between JR West Biwako Line Notogawa Station and Ohmi Railway Yōkaichi Station
