= Kotō, Shiga =

Dissolved municipality in Shiga prefecture, Japan

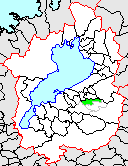
Location of Koto

Kotō (湖東町, Kotō-chō) was a town located in Echi District, Shiga Prefecture, Japan. "Kotō" means "east of Lake Biwa".

As of 2003, the town had an estimated population of 9,061 and a density of 341.54 persons per km⊃2. The total area was 26.53 km^{2}.

On February 11, 2005, Kotō, along with the city of Yōkaichi, the towns of Eigenji and Gokashō (both from Kanzaki District), and the town of Aitō (also from Echi District), was merged to create the city of Higashiōmi.
