= Aitō, Shiga =

Aitō 愛東町
- Town
- Flag

- Location within Japan
- Coordinates: 35°07′28″N 136°19′07″E
- Country: Japan
- Prefecture: Shiga
- District: Echi
- Founded: February 11th, 1971

Area
  - Total: 40.89 km^{2} (15.79 sq mi)

Population
  - Total: 5,826
  - Density: 142.5/km^{2} (369.0/sq mi)
- Time zone: UTC+9 (Japan Standard Time)

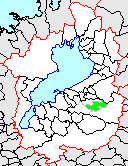
Location of Aito

Aitō (愛東町, Aitō-chō) was a town located in Echi District, Shiga Prefecture, Japan. "Aitō" means "eastern Echi".

It was founded February 11, 1971.

As of 2003, the town had an estimated population of 5,826 and a density of 142.48 persons per km^{2}. The total area was 40.89 km^{2}.

On February 11, 2005, Aitō, along with the city of Yōkaichi, the towns of Eigenji and Gokashō (both from Kanzaki District), and the town of Kotō (also from Echi District), was merged to create the city of Higashiōmi.
