= Gamō, Shiga =

Dissolved municipality in Shiga prefecture, Japan

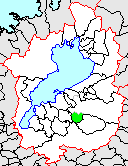
Location of Gamo

Gamō (蒲生町, Gamō-chō) was a town located in Gamō District, Shiga, Japan.

As of 2003, the town had an estimated population of 14,710 and a density of 424.65 persons per km^{2}. The total area was 34.64 km^{2}.

On January 1, 2006, Gamō, along with the town of Notogawa (from Kanzaki District), was merged into the expanded city of Higashiōmi.

== Sister city ==
- Buyeo-gun Jangam, Chungcheongnam-do, South Korea
