= Chūzu, Shiga =

Former town in Shiga, Japan

Chūzu 中主町
- Town
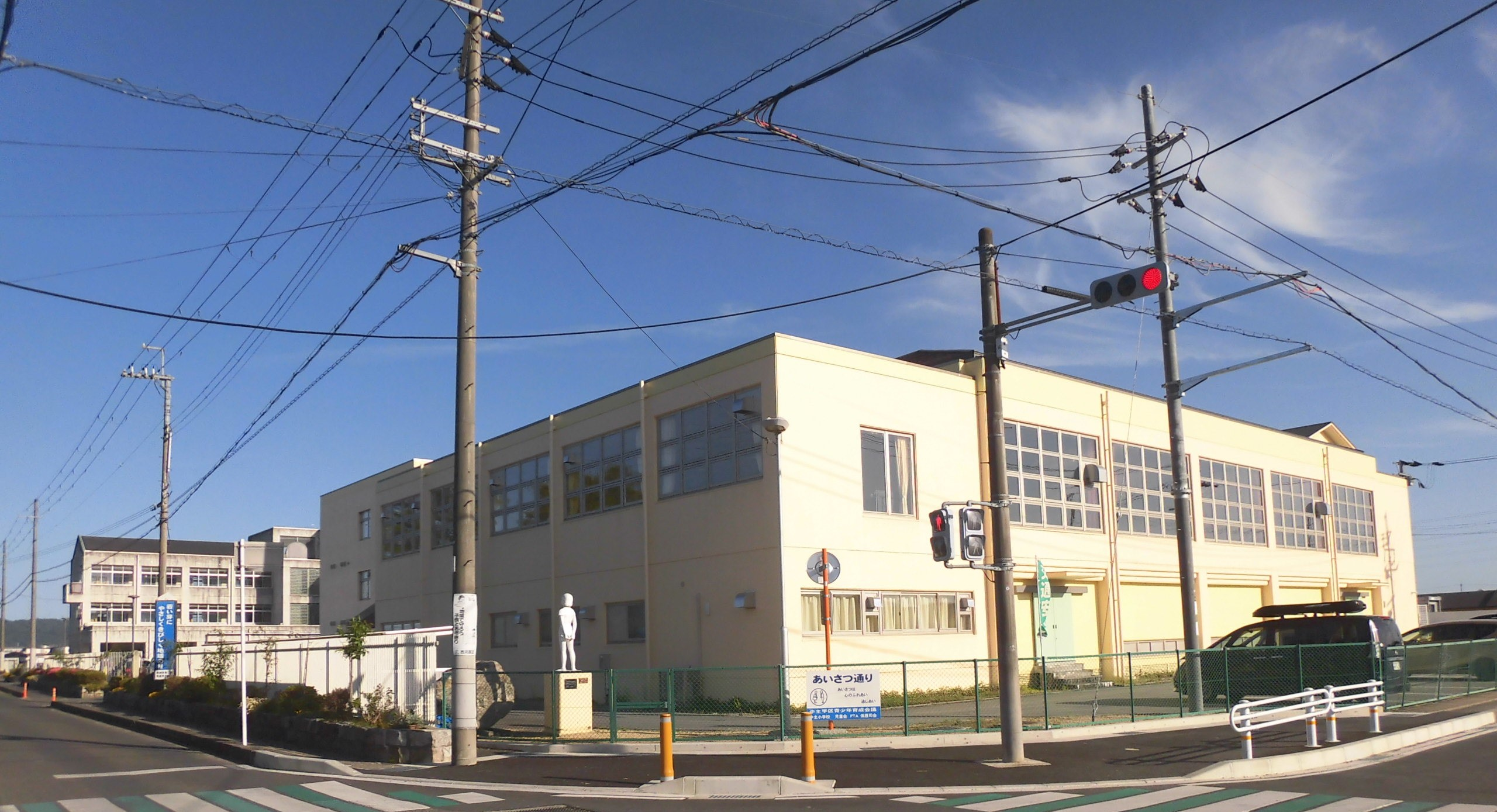
- Yasu Chūzu Elementary School

- Flag Seal

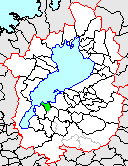
- Location of Chūzu in Shiga Prefecture
- Country: Japan
- Region: Kansai
- Prefecture: Shiga

Area
  - Total: 20.94 km^{2} (8.08 sq mi)

Population (2003)
  - Total: 12,192
  - Density: 20.94/km^{2} (54.2/sq mi)
- Time zone: UTC+09:00 (JST)

Chūzu (中主町, Chūzu-chō) was a town in Yasu District, Shiga, Japan.

As of 2003, the town had an estimated population of 12,192 and a density of 582.23 inhabitants per square kilometre (1,508.0/sq mi). The total area was 20.94 square kilometres (8.08 sq mi).

On October 1, 2004, Chūzu was merged into the town of Yasu (also from Yasu District) to create the city of Yasu.
