= Yasu District, Shiga =

Former district in Shiga prefecture, Japan

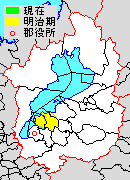
Map of Yasu District with Meiji period (1890) area in yellow.

Yasu (野洲郡, Yasu-gun) was a district located in Shiga Prefecture, Japan.

On October 1, 2004, the former town of Yasu absorbed the town of Chūzu, effectively turning Yasu District into Yasu City. Therefore, Yasu District was dissolved as a result of this merger.

As of 2003, the district had an estimated population of 49,155 and a density of 799.92 persons per km^{2}. The total area was 61.45 km^{2}.

== Former Towns and villages ==
- Chūzu
- Yasu

== Transition ==
Light blue autonomies are Yasu District's town, deep blue autonomies are Yasu District's village, and gray autonomies are others.

April 1, 1889	1889 - 1926	1927 - 1954	1955 - 1989		1990 -	Now
Moriyama (守山)	February 1, 1904; Moriyama	July 10, 1941; Moriyama	January 15, 1955; Moriyama	July 1, 1970; Moriyama City	Moriyama	Moriyama
Kurita D Mononobe (物部) Village	Kurita D Mononobe	July 10, 1941; Moriyama	January 15, 1955; Moriyama	July 1, 1970; Moriyama City	Moriyama	Moriyama
Ozu (小津)	Ozu	Ozu	January 15, 1955; Moriyama	July 1, 1970; Moriyama City	Moriyama	Moriyama
Tamatsu (玉津)	Tamatsu	Tamatsu	January 15, 1955; Moriyama	July 1, 1970; Moriyama City	Moriyama	Moriyama
Kawanishi (河西)	Kawanishi	Kawanishi	January 15, 1955; Moriyama	July 1, 1970; Moriyama City	Moriyama	Moriyama
Hayano (速野)	Hayano	Hayano	January 15, 1955; Moriyama	July 1, 1970; Moriyama City	Moriyama	Moriyama
Nakasu (中洲)	Nakasu	Nakasu	March 1, 1957 incorpotation into Moriyama	July 1, 1970; Moriyama City	Moriyama	Moriyama
Nakasu (中洲)	Nakasu	Nakasu	March 1, 1957 incorpotation into Chūzu	Chūzu	October 1, 2004; Yasu City	Yasu
Hyōzu (兵主)	Hyōzu	Hyōzu	April 1, 1955; Chūzu	Chūzu	October 1, 2004; Yasu City	Yasu
Nakasato (中里)	Nakasato	Nakasato	April 1, 1955; Chūzu	Chūzu	October 1, 2004; Yasu City	Yasu
Yasu (野洲)	October 17, 1911; Yasu	May 20, 1942; Yasu	April 1, 1955; Yasu		October 1, 2004; Yasu City	Yasu
Mikami (三上)	Mikami	May 20, 1942; Yasu	April 1, 1955; Yasu		October 1, 2004; Yasu City	Yasu
Giō (義王)	August 22, 1894 rename Giō (祇王)	Giō	April 1, 1955; Yasu		October 1, 2004; Yasu City	Yasu
Shinohara (篠原)	Shinohara	Shinohara	April 1, 1955; Yasu		October 1, 2004; Yasu City	Yasu
Kitasato (北里)	Kitasato	Kitasato	March 3, 1955 incorpotation into Ōmihachiman (近江八幡) City		Ōmihachiman	Ōmihachiman
