= Eigenji, Shiga =

Dissolved municipality in Shiga prefecture, Japan

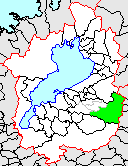
Location of Eigenji

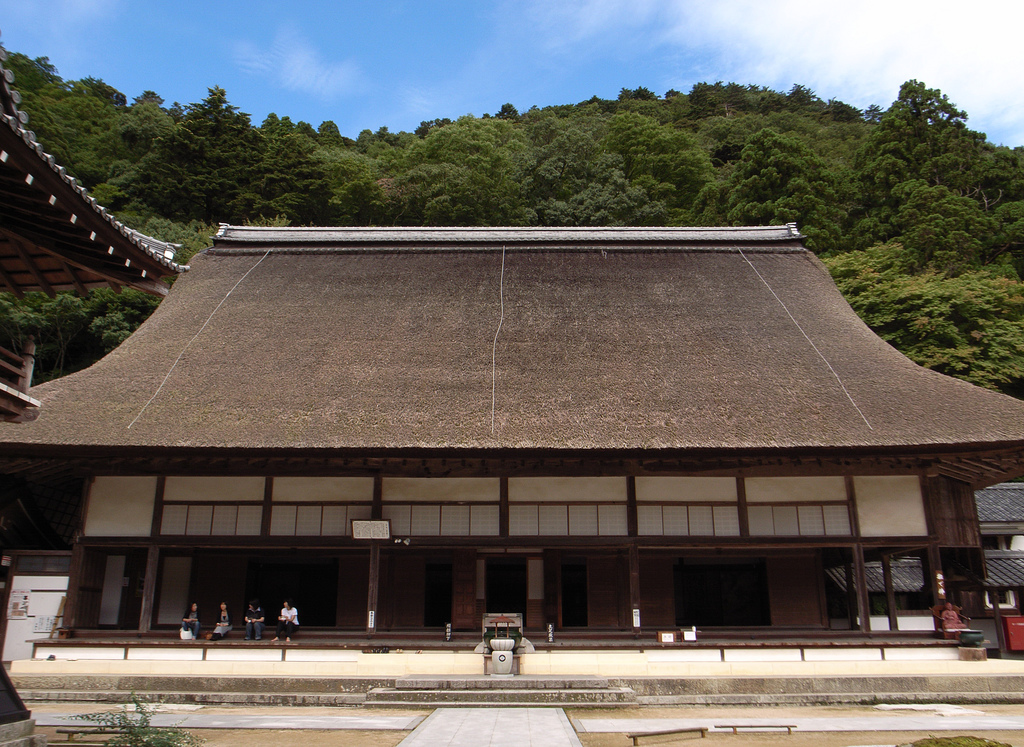
Eigen-ji temple

Eigenji (永源寺町, Eigenji-chō) was a Japanese town in Kanzaki District, Shiga Prefecture, Japan, at the western foot of Suzuka Mountains.

As of 2003, the town had an estimated population of 6,194 and a density of 34.17 persons per km^{2}. The total area was 181.27 km^{2}.

On February 11, 2005, Eigenji was merged with the city of Yōkaichi, the town of Gokashō (also from Kanzaki District), and the towns of Aitō and Kotō (both from Echi District), to create the city of Higashiōmi.
