= Echi District, Shiga =

District in Shiga prefecture, Japan

Coordinates: 35°10′N 136°13′E

Map of Echi District in Shiga Prefecture

Echi (愛知郡, Echi-gun) is a district located in Shiga Prefecture, Japan.

As of 2003, the district has an estimated population of 34,262 and a density of 325.07 persons per km^{2}. The total area is 105.40 km^{2}.

== Towns and villages ==
=== Current town ===
- Aishō

=== Former towns ===
- Aitō
- Echigawa
- Hatashō
- Kotō

== Mergers ==
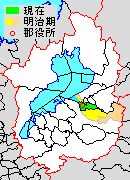
Map of Echi District with Meiji period (1890) area in yellow, modern area in green.

- On February 11, 2005 the towns of Aitō and Kotō merged with the towns of Eigenji and Gokashō, both from Kanzaki District, and the old city of Yōkaichi, to form the new city of Higashiōmi.
- On February 26, 2006 the towns of Echigawa and Hatashō merged to form the new town of Aishō.
