= Gamō District, Shiga =

District in Shiga Prefecture, Japan

Coordinates: 35.027036°N 136.220007°E

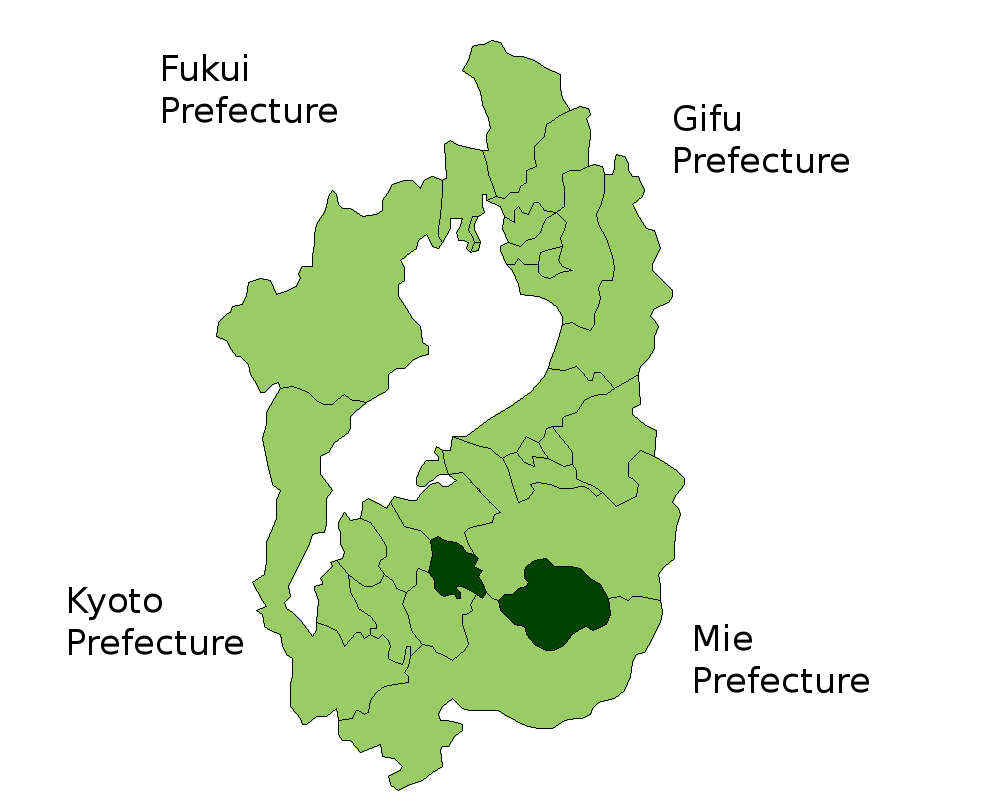
Map of Gamo District in Shiga Prefecture

Gamō (蒲生郡, Gamō-gun) is a district located in Shiga Prefecture, Japan.

As of September 1, 2011, the district has an estimated population of 35,629 and a density of 220 persons per km^{2}. The total area is 162.15 km^{2}.

== Towns ==
- Hino
- Ryūō

== Merger ==
- On January 1, 2006 the town of Gamō merged into the city of Higashiōmi.
- On March 21, 2010 the town of Azuchi merged into the city of Ōmihachiman.

== Transition ==
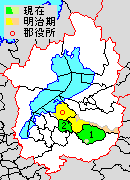
Map of Gamo District with Meiji period (1890) area in yellow, modern area in green.

Light blue autonomies are Gamō District's towns, deep blue autonomies are Gamō District's villages, and gray autonomies are others.

April 1, 1889	1889 - 1926	1927 - 1944	1945–1954		1955–1989		1990 -	Now
Hachiman (八幡)	Hachiman	Hachiman	Hachiman	March 31, 1954; Ōmihachiman (近江八幡) City	Ōmihachiman	Ōmihachiman	Ōmihachiman	Ōmihachiman
Utsuro (宇津呂)	Utsuro	March 3, 1933 incorporation into Hachiman	Hachiman	March 31, 1954; Ōmihachiman (近江八幡) City	Ōmihachiman	Ōmihachiman	Ōmihachiman	Ōmihachiman
Shima (島)	Shima	Shima	April 1, 1951 incorporation into Hachiman	March 31, 1954; Ōmihachiman (近江八幡) City	Ōmihachiman	Ōmihachiman	Ōmihachiman	Ōmihachiman
Okayama (岡山)	Okayama	Okayama	Okayama	March 31, 1954; Ōmihachiman (近江八幡) City	Ōmihachiman	Ōmihachiman	Ōmihachiman	Ōmihachiman
Kaneda (金田)	Kaneda	Kaneda	Kaneda	March 31, 1954; Ōmihachiman (近江八幡) City	Ōmihachiman	Ōmihachiman	Ōmihachiman	Ōmihachiman
Kirihara (桐原)	Kirihara	Kirihara	Kirihara	March 31, 1954; Ōmihachiman (近江八幡) City	Ōmihachiman	Ōmihachiman	Ōmihachiman	Ōmihachiman
Mabuchi (馬淵)	Mabuchi	Mabuchi	Mabuchi	March 31, 1954; Ōmihachiman (近江八幡) City	Ōmihachiman	Ōmihachiman	Ōmihachiman	Ōmihachiman
Musa (武佐)	Musa	Musa	Musa		February 1, 1958 incorporation into Ōmihachiman	Ōmihachiman	Ōmihachiman	Ōmihachiman
Azuchi (安土)	Azuchi	Azuchi	April 1, 1954; Azuchi		Azuchi		March 21, 2010 incorporation into Ōmihachiman	Ōmihachiman
Oiso (老蘇)	Oiso	Oiso	April 1, 1954; Azuchi		Azuchi		March 21, 2010 incorporation into Ōmihachiman	Ōmihachiman
Kagamiyama (鏡山)	Kagamiyama	Kagamiyama	Kagamiyama		April 29, 1955; Ryūō (竜王)		Ryūō	Ryūō
Na (苗)	Na	Na	Na		April 29, 1955; Ryūō (竜王)		Ryūō	Ryūō
Nakano (中野)	Nakano	Nakano	March 21, 1954 part of Kanzaki D, Yōkaichi (八日市) Town	August 15, 1954; Yōkaichi City	Yōkaichi		February 11, 2005; Higashiōmi (東近江) City	Higashiōmi
Ichinobe (市辺)	Ichinobe	Ichinobe	Ichinobe	August 15, 1954; Yōkaichi City	Yōkaichi		February 11, 2005; Higashiōmi (東近江) City	Higashiōmi
Tamao (玉緒)	Tamao	Tamao	Tamao	August 15, 1954; Yōkaichi City	Yōkaichi		February 11, 2005; Higashiōmi (東近江) City	Higashiōmi
Hirata (平田)	Hirata	Hirata	Hirata	August 15, 1954; Yōkaichi City	Yōkaichi		February 11, 2005; Higashiōmi (東近江) City	Higashiōmi
Ichihara (市原)	Ichihara	Ichihara	Ichihara		April 1, 1955 part of Kanzaki D, Eigenji (永源寺) Town		February 11, 2005; Higashiōmi (東近江) City	Higashiōmi
Sakuragawa (桜川)	Sakuragawa	Sakuragawa	Sakuragawa		April 1, 1955; Gamō (蒲生)		January 1, 2006 incorporation into Higashiōmi	Higashiōmi
Asahino (朝日野)	Asahino	Asahino	Asahino		April 1, 1955; Gamō (蒲生)		January 1, 2006 incorporation into Higashiōmi	Higashiōmi
Hino (日野)	Hino	Hino	Hino		March 16, 1955; Hino		Hino	Hino
Kita-hissa (北比都佐)	Kita-hissa	Kita-hissa	Kita-hissa		March 16, 1955; Hino		Hino	Hino
Minami-hissa (南比都佐)	Minami-hissa	Minami-hissa	Minami-hissa		March 16, 1955; Hino		Hino	Hino
Kaigake (鎌掛)	Kaigake	Kaigake	Kaigake		March 16, 1955; Hino		Hino	Hino
Nishiōji (西大路)	Nishiōji	Nishiōji	Nishiōji		March 16, 1955; Hino		Hino	Hino
Sakuradani (桜谷)	May 12, 1894; Higashi-sakuradani (東桜谷)	Higashi-sakuradani	Higashi-sakuradani		March 16, 1955; Hino		Hino	Hino
Sakuradani (桜谷)	May 12, 1894; Nishi-sakuradani (西桜谷)	Nishi-sakuradani	Nishi-sakuradani		March 16, 1955; Hino		Hino	Hino
