= Yōkaichi, Shiga =

City located in Shiga Prefecture, Japan

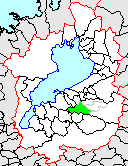
Location of Yokaichi

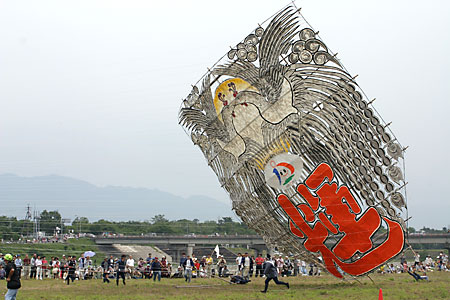
The Yokaichi Giant Kite Festival

Flag used until 2005

Emblem used until 2005

Yōkaichi (八日市市, Yōkaichi-shi) was a city located in Shiga Prefecture, Japan.

As of 2003, the city had an estimated population of 44,823 and the density of 852.15 persons per km^{2}. The total area was 52.60 km^{2}.

On February 11, 2005, Yōkaichi, along with the towns of Eigenji and Gokashō (both from Kanzaki District), and the towns of Aitō and Kotō (both from Echi District), was merged to create the city of Higashiōmi.

The city was founded on August 15, 1954.

Yokaichi is famous for the Giant Kite Festival held on the fourth Sunday in May.
