= Kanzaki District, Shiga =

Former district in Shiga prefecture, Japan

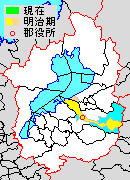
Map of Kanzaki District with Meiji period (1890) area in yellow.

Kanzaki (神崎郡, Kanzaki-gun) was a district located in Shiga Prefecture, Japan.

As of 2003, the district had an estimated population of 41,048 and a density of 179.51 persons per km^{2}. The total area was 228.67 km^{2}.

== Towns and villages ==
- Eigenji
- Gokashō
- Notogawa

== Mergers ==
- On February 11, 2005 - the towns of Eigenji and Gokashō, along with the towns of Aitō and Kotō (both from Echi District), and the city of Yōkaichi, were merged to create the city of Higashiōmi.
- On January 1, 2006 - the town of Notogawa, along with the town of Gamō (from Gamō District), was merged into the expanded city of Higashiōmi. Kanzaki District was dissolved as a result of this merger.

== Transition ==
Light blue autonomies are Kanzaki District's town, deep blue autonomies are Kanzaki District's village, and gray autonomies are others.

April 1, 1889	1889 - 1929	1930–1944		1945–1954		1955–1989		1990 -	Now
Yōkaichi (八日市)	Yōkaichi	Yōkaichi		March 21, 1954; Yōkaichi	August 15, 1954; Yōkaichi City	Yōkaichi		February 11, 2005; Higashiōmi (東近江) City	Higashiōmi
Gamō D Nakano (中野) Village	Gamō D Nakano	Gamō D Nakano		March 21, 1954; Yōkaichi	August 15, 1954; Yōkaichi City	Yōkaichi		February 11, 2005; Higashiōmi (東近江) City	Higashiōmi
Misono (御園)	Misono	Misono		Misono	August 15, 1954; Yōkaichi City	Yōkaichi		February 11, 2005; Higashiōmi (東近江) City	Higashiōmi
Tatebe (建部)	Tatebe	Tatebe		Tatebe	August 15, 1954; Yōkaichi City	Yōkaichi		February 11, 2005; Higashiōmi (東近江) City	Higashiōmi
Yamagami (山上)	Yamagami	Yamagami	April 1, 1943; Eigenji (永源寺)	Eigenji		April 1, 1955; Eigenji		February 11, 2005; Higashiōmi (東近江) City	Higashiōmi
Echi D Higashi-ogura (東小椋) Village	Echi D Higashi-ogura	Echi D Higashi-ogura	April 1, 1943; Eigenji (永源寺)	Eigenji		April 1, 1955; Eigenji		February 11, 2005; Higashiōmi (東近江) City	Higashiōmi
Echi D Higashi-ogura (東小椋) Village	October 15, 1892 separation Echi D Takano (高野) Village	Echi D Takano (高野) Village	April 1, 1943; Eigenji (永源寺)	Eigenji		April 1, 1955; Eigenji		February 11, 2005; Higashiōmi (東近江) City	Higashiōmi
Gamō D Ichihara (市原) Village	Gamō D Ichihara	Gamō D Ichihara		Gamō D Ichihara		April 1, 1955; Eigenji		February 11, 2005; Higashiōmi (東近江) City	Higashiōmi
Higashi-gokashō (東五個荘)	March 15, 1890 rename Asahi (旭)	Asahi		Asahi		January 1, 1955; Gokashō (五個荘)		February 11, 2005; Higashiōmi (東近江) City	Higashiōmi
Minami-gokashō (南五個荘)	Minami-gokashō	Minami-gokashō		Minami-gokashō		January 1, 1955; Gokashō (五個荘)		February 11, 2005; Higashiōmi (東近江) City	Higashiōmi
Kita-gokashō (北五個荘)	Kita-gokashō	Kita-gokashō		Kita-gokashō		January 1, 1955; Gokashō (五個荘)		February 11, 2005; Higashiōmi (東近江) City	Higashiōmi
Gamō D Oiso (老蘇) Village; Shimizuhana (清水鼻)	Gamō D, Oiso; Shimizuhana	Gamō D, Oiso; Shimizuhana		April 1, 1954; Gamō D, Azuchi (安土) Town; Shimizuhana		January 1, 1955; Gokashō (五個荘)		February 11, 2005; Higashiōmi (東近江) City	Higashiōmi
Hachijō (八条)	June 5, 1894; Notogawa (能登川)	Notogawa	February 11, 1942; Notogawa	Notogawa		Notogawa		January 1, 2006 incorporate in Higashiōmi	Higashiōmi
Hachijō (八条)	June 5, 1894; Gohō (五峰)	Gohō	February 11, 1942; Notogawa	Notogawa		Notogawa		January 1, 2006 incorporate in Higashiōmi	Higashiōmi
Hachijō (八条)	June 5, 1894; Iba (伊庭)	Iba	February 11, 1942; Notogawa	Notogawa		Notogawa		January 1, 2006 incorporate in Higashiōmi	Higashiōmi
Kurimi (栗見)	Kurimi	Kurimi	February 11, 1942; Notogawa	Notogawa		Notogawa		January 1, 2006 incorporate in Higashiōmi	Higashiōmi
Kurimi (栗見)	August 15, 1897 separation Kurimishō (栗見荘)	November 8, 1927 incorporation into Yawata	February 11, 1942; Notogawa	Notogawa		Notogawa		January 1, 2006 incorporate in Higashiōmi	Higashiōmi
Yawata (八幡)	Yawata	Yawata	February 11, 1942; Notogawa	Notogawa		Notogawa		January 1, 2006 incorporate in Higashiōmi	Higashiōmi
Haemi (葉枝見)	March 29, 1896; Echi D, Haemi	Echi D, Haemi		Echi D, Haemi		January 1, 1955 part of Echi D, Inae (稲枝) Town	April 1, 1967 incorpotation into Hikone (彦根) City	Hikone	Hikone
