= Kurita District, Shiga =

Former district in Shiga prefecture, Japan

Coordinates: 35°00′37″N 135°59′07″E

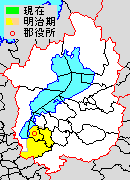
Map of Kurita District with Meiji period (1890) area in yellow.

Kurita (栗太郡, Kurita-gun) was a district located in Shiga Prefecture, Japan.

On 1 October 2001, Rittō Town was elevated to city status to become Rittō City; therefore, Kurita District was dissolved as a result of this change of status. Historically, Kusatsu City belonged to Kurita District, too.
