= Takeshima (Shiga) =

Island in Shiga, Japan

Native name: 多景島
- Location of Takeshima Takeshima (Shiga) (Japan)

Geography
- Location: Lake Biwa
- Coordinates: 35°17′51″N 136°10′57″E

Administration
- Japan

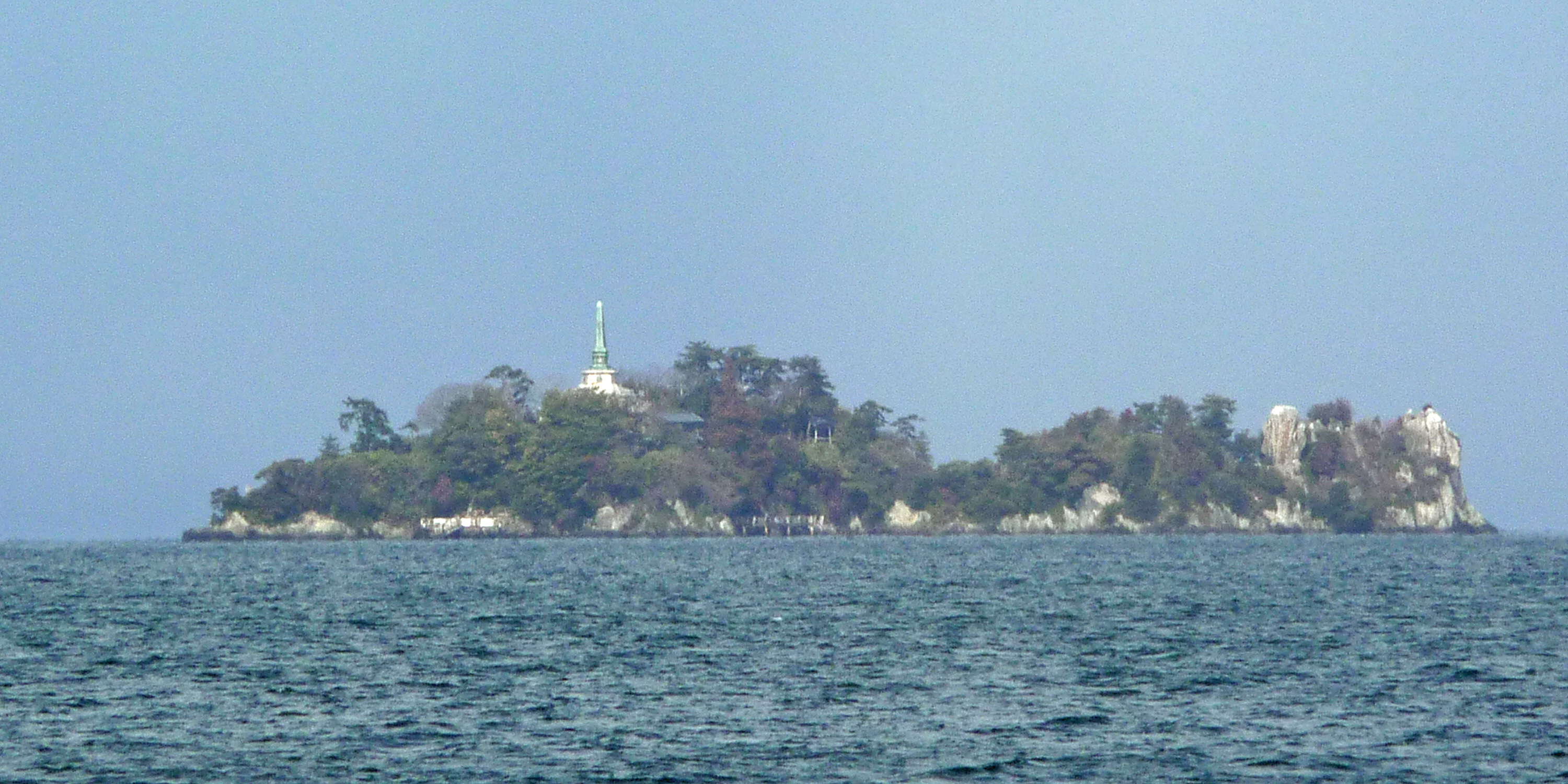
Takeijima photographed from Lake Biwa Kisen

Takeshima (多景島) is an island in Shiga, Japan. It is uninhabited and part of Biwako Quasi National Park. It is the smallest island of Lake Biwa and is administered by the city of Hikone which is 6.5 km east of the island. The island is formed of granite and it is the only place where Biwamelania takeshimensis, an endemic snail is found.

== History ==
The island was first settled in 1655 when Nissei Shōnin, a monk from Nagahama founded Mitō-ji, which still functions as the island's main temple. He also carved the Buddhist sutra, Namu Myōhō Renge Kyō, into a rock which still stands on the island; however in 2018 the top half of the rock broke off due to weathering. The island's temple has since been renamed Ryomuzankento-ji. Due to the fact that the island is uninhabited it lacks a chief monk and one can only receive the island's shuin by contacting a branch temple in Hikone.

== Transport ==
Takeshima is accessible by ferry from Hikone. The ferries are operated by Omi Ferries who operate two ferries per day to the island however only one of these ferries land at the island and the other only encircles it.
