= Shiga, Shiga =

Dissolved municipality in Shiga prefecture, Japan

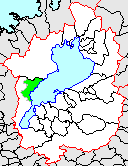

Shiga (志賀町, Shiga-chō) was a town in Shiga District, Shiga Prefecture, Japan. It was on the western shore of Lake Biwa and the eastern foot of Hira Mountains.

== Population ==
In 2003, the town had an estimated population of 21,964 and a density of 306.20 inhabitants per square kilometre (793.1/sq mi). The total area was 71.73 km^{2} (27.70 sq mi).

== History ==
On March 20, 2006, Shiga was merged into the expanded city of Ōtsu.

The original village called Shiga (滋賀 instead of 志賀) was slightly north of Ōtsu and merged with Ōtsu on May 10, 1932. A new town called Shiga was established on October 1, 1955, upon the mergers of Wani (和邇), Kido (木戸), and Komatsu (小松) villages, farther north of Ōtsu.
