= Ashiura Kannon-ji =

Buddhist temple in Shiga Prefecture, Japan

- 芦浦観音寺
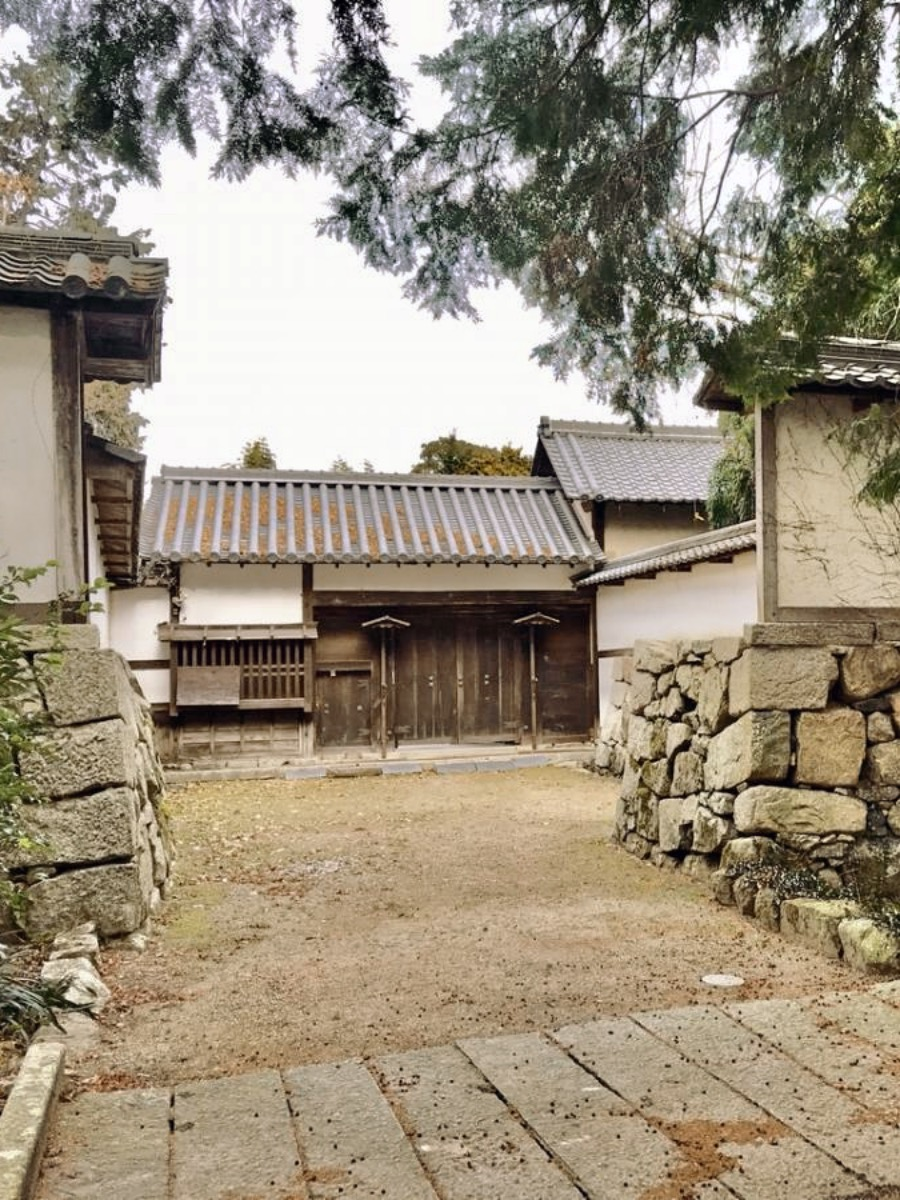
- Ashiura Kannon-ji Entrance.jpg

- Location within Shiga Prefecture Location within Japan

Religion
- Affiliation: Buddhism
- Sect: Tendai
- Prefecture: Shiga
- Region: Kansai

Location
- Municipality: Kusatsu
- Country: Japan
- Interactive map of Ashiura Kannon-ji
- Prefecture: Shiga
- Coordinates: 35°03′35″N 135°57′18″E

Architecture
- Founder: c. Prince Shōtoku
- Established: c. Hakuho period

Website
- Official website

Ashiura Kannon-ji (芦浦観音寺) is a Buddhist temple of the Tendai sect located in the city of Kusatsu, Shiga Prefecture, Japan. The temple was founded in the Hakuho period and its grounds were designated a National Historic Site in 2004. The complex includes several Muromachi or Edo Period buildings, two of which are designated as Important Cultural Properties.

== History ==
The foundations of Ashiura Kannon-ji are uncertain. According to the temple's legend, it was founded by Prince Shōtoku and Hata no Kawakatsu and belonged to the Sanron sect of early Japanese Buddhism. It is known that the Hata clan controlled much of the area of Ōmi Province during this period, and archaeological excavations have found Hakuho period roof tiles confirming that a temple existed here since the late 7th century AD. At some point it fell into ruins, and it was restored in 1408 as a temple of the Tendai school. The location of the temple is strategic point for amphibious and land transportation in the southeastern part of Lake Biwa, as it is on the ancient Tōsandō (Nakasendō) and Tōkaidō highways connecting the capital of Heian-kyō with the provinces of eastern Japan, as well as the main route from Kyoto to the Ise Grand Shrine. From the Sengoku period, the temple gained great wealth and political power. Toyotomi Hideyoshi named the head abbot of the temple as a daikan and bugyō with control over all shipping on Lake Biwa, and estates in southern Ōmi with a kokudaka of 24,000 koku. The head abbot accompanied Tokugawa Ieyasu to Hizen as an aide-de-camp to Tokugawa Ieyasu during the Japanese invasions of Korea (1592–1598). Following the establishment of the Tokugawa shogunate, Tokugawa Ieyasu and his early successors, increased the temple's holdings to 40,000 koku, which was equivalent to that of medium-sized daimyō fief, and the temple was also responsible for maintaining the Nakahara Goten, a palace constructed for the purpose of providing lodging to the Shogun should he ever need to visit Kyoto. However, in a reform of the shogunal administration in 1685, the temple's secular responsibilities were abolished.

== Precincts ==
The temple itself was located in a fortified compound, surrounded by moats and high earthen walls. The temple's Amida-do was constructed in the Muromachi period and was relocated to this location from the temple of Fukan-ji in Kyoto. It is a National Important Cultural Property. The temple's Shoin is a surviving structure of the early Edo Period Nakahara Goten, and is also a National Important Cultural Property.

The temple is open to the public only twice a year, for two days in the spring and for one day in autumn.

== See also ==
- List of Historic Sites of Japan (Shiga)
