= Mount Bunagatake =

Mountain in Ōtsu, Shiga Prefecture, Japan

- 武奈ヶ岳
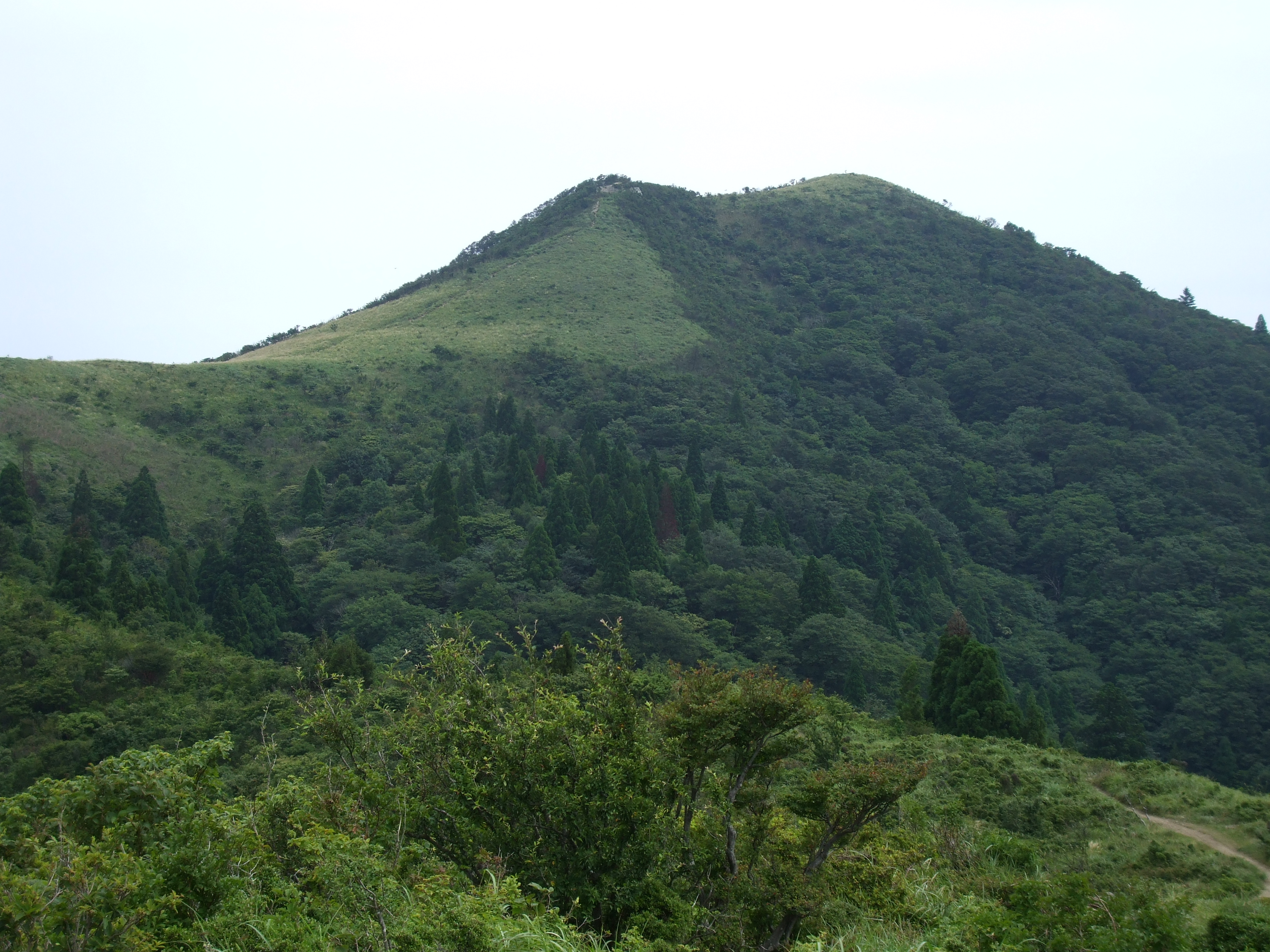
- A View of Mount Bunagatake from Mount Goza

Highest point
- Elevation: 1,214.4 m (3,984 ft)
- Listing: Mountains of Japan
- Coordinates: 35°15′N 135°53′E

Naming
- Language of name: Japanese

Geography
- Location within Japan
- Location: Ōtsu, Shiga, Japan
- Parent range: Hira Mountains

Mount Bunagatake (武奈ヶ岳, Bunagatake) is a 1,214.4-metre-high (3,984 ft) mountain in Ōtsu, Shiga Prefecture, Japan. This mountain is one of the 200 famous mountains in Japan and also one of the Kinki 100 mountains.

== Outline ==
Mount Bunagatake is the highest mountain of Hira Mountains. Hira mountains consist of three parts, Oku-Hira, Kita-Hira and Minami-Hira, literally, ‘Deep Hira’, ‘North Hira’, and ‘South Hira’. Mount Bunagatake belongs to Oku-Hira, and on the Mesozoic strata as other mountains of Oku-Hira. This mountain is also a part of Biwako Quasi-National Park, and visitors can enjoy the almost 360 degree panorama view from the top.

== Access ==
From Hira Station to the middle of this mountain, Hira Chair Lift, which was made in 1960, and Hira Ropeway opened in 1961, connected until 2004 with a Bus route by Kojyaku Bus. However the chair lift and the ropeway were removed in 2004, and the Bus route was also discontinued after that.

- Hira Station of Kosei Line
- Bomura Bus Stop of Kyoto Bus

== Image gallery ==
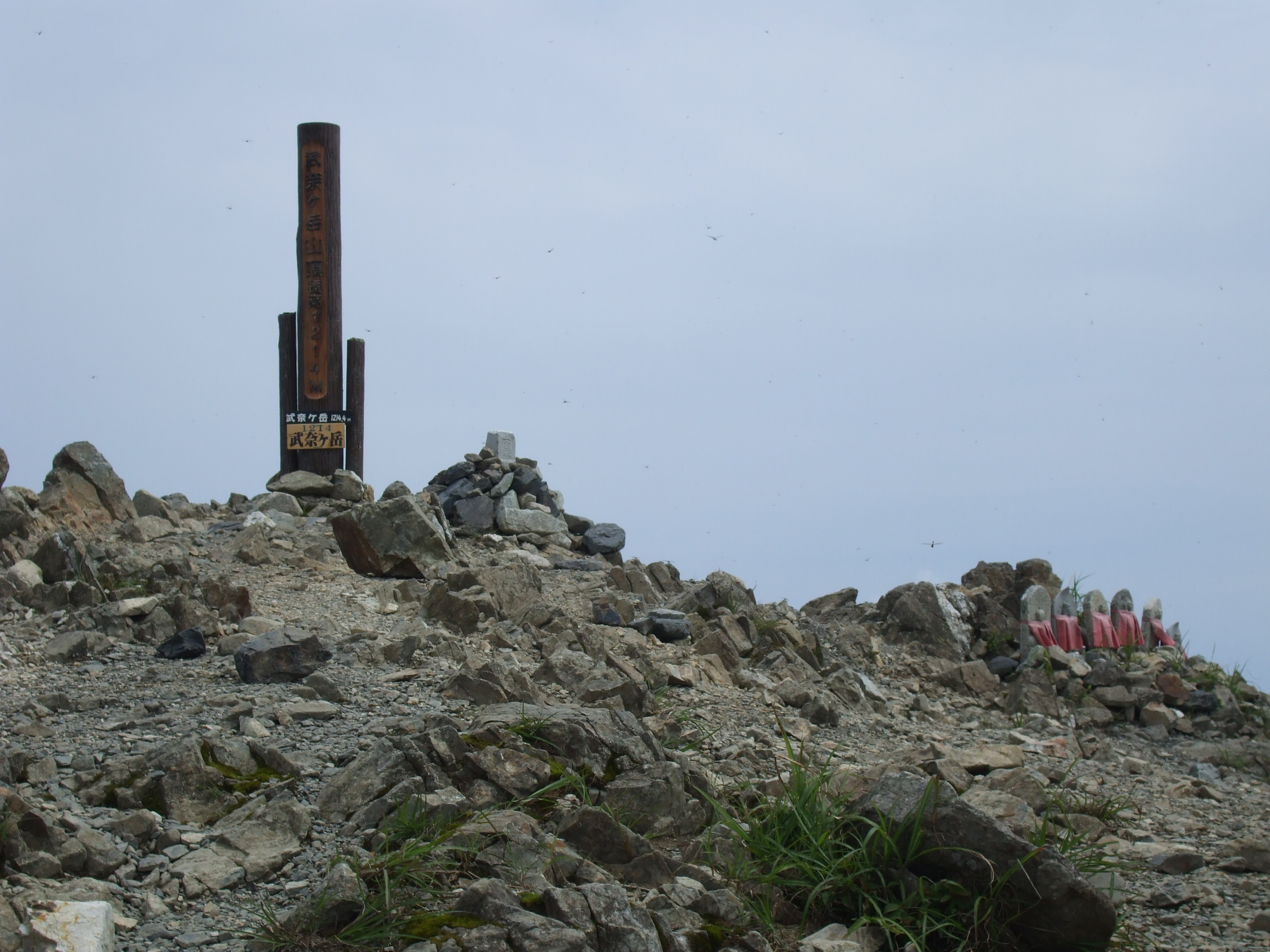
Top of Mount Bunagatake

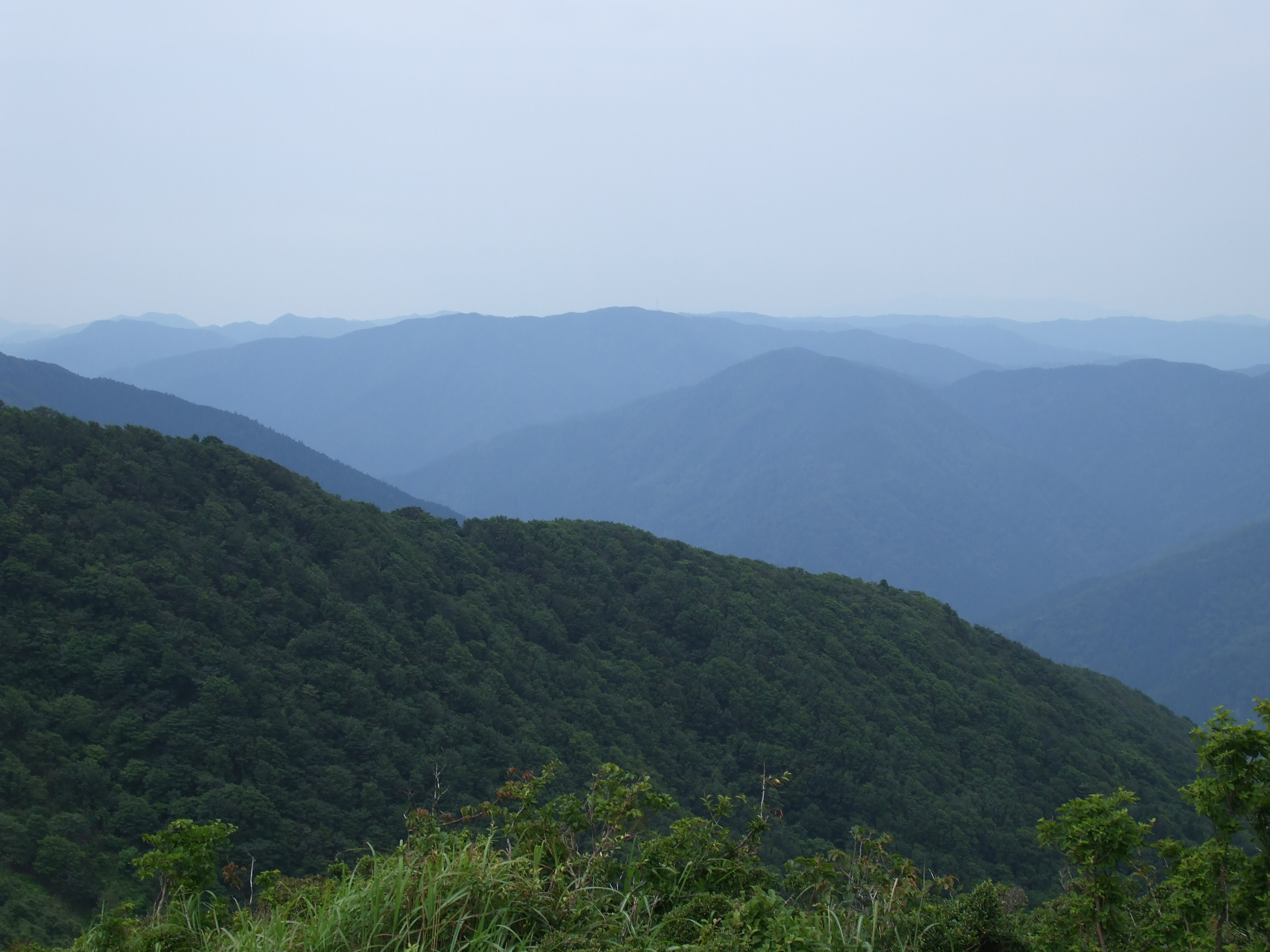
West view from the top

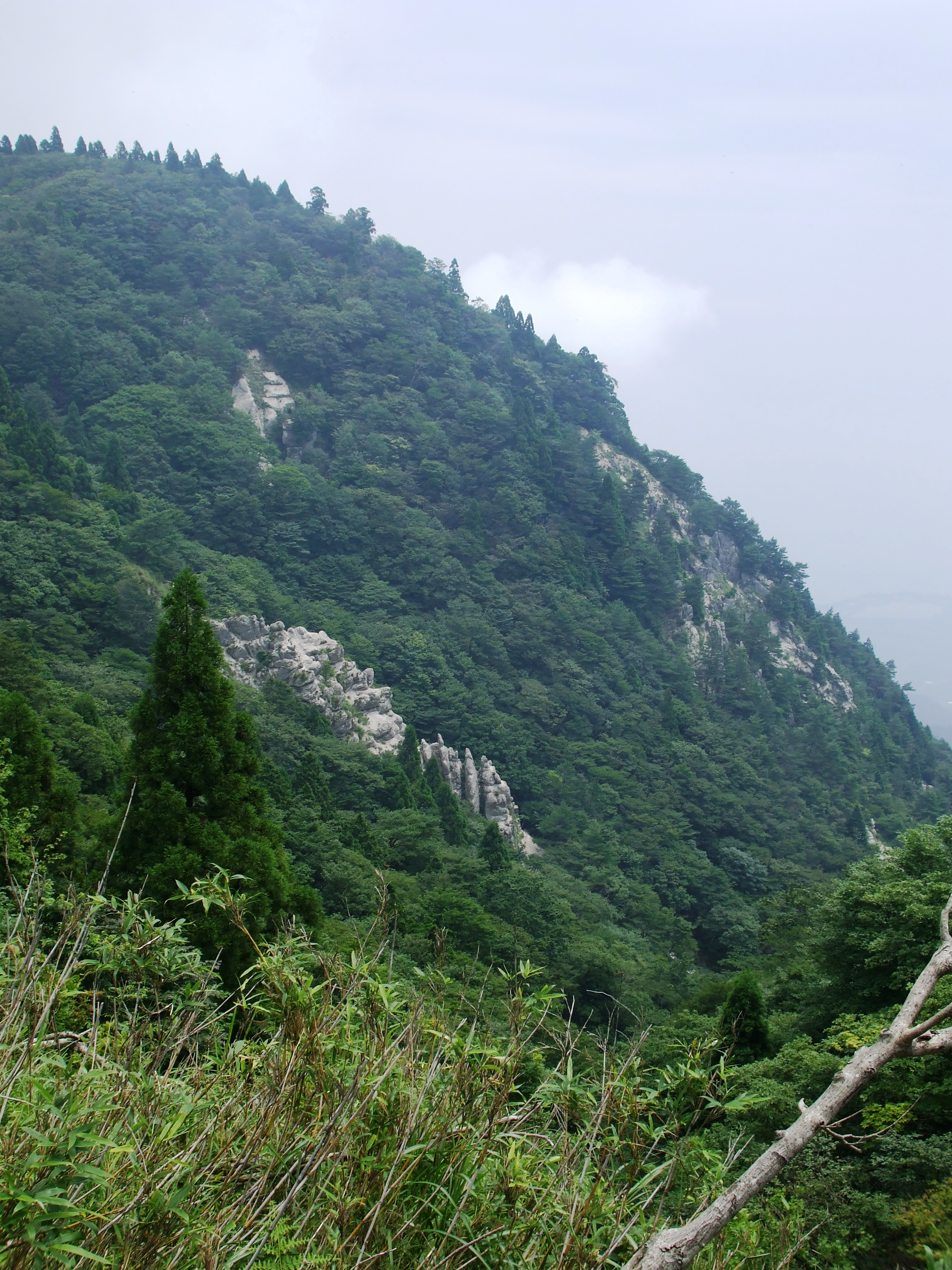
A view of the middle of the mountain
