= Mizunomori Water Botanical Garden =

Japanese attraction in Shiga, comprised aquatic plants

- Kusatsu Aquatic Botanical Garden
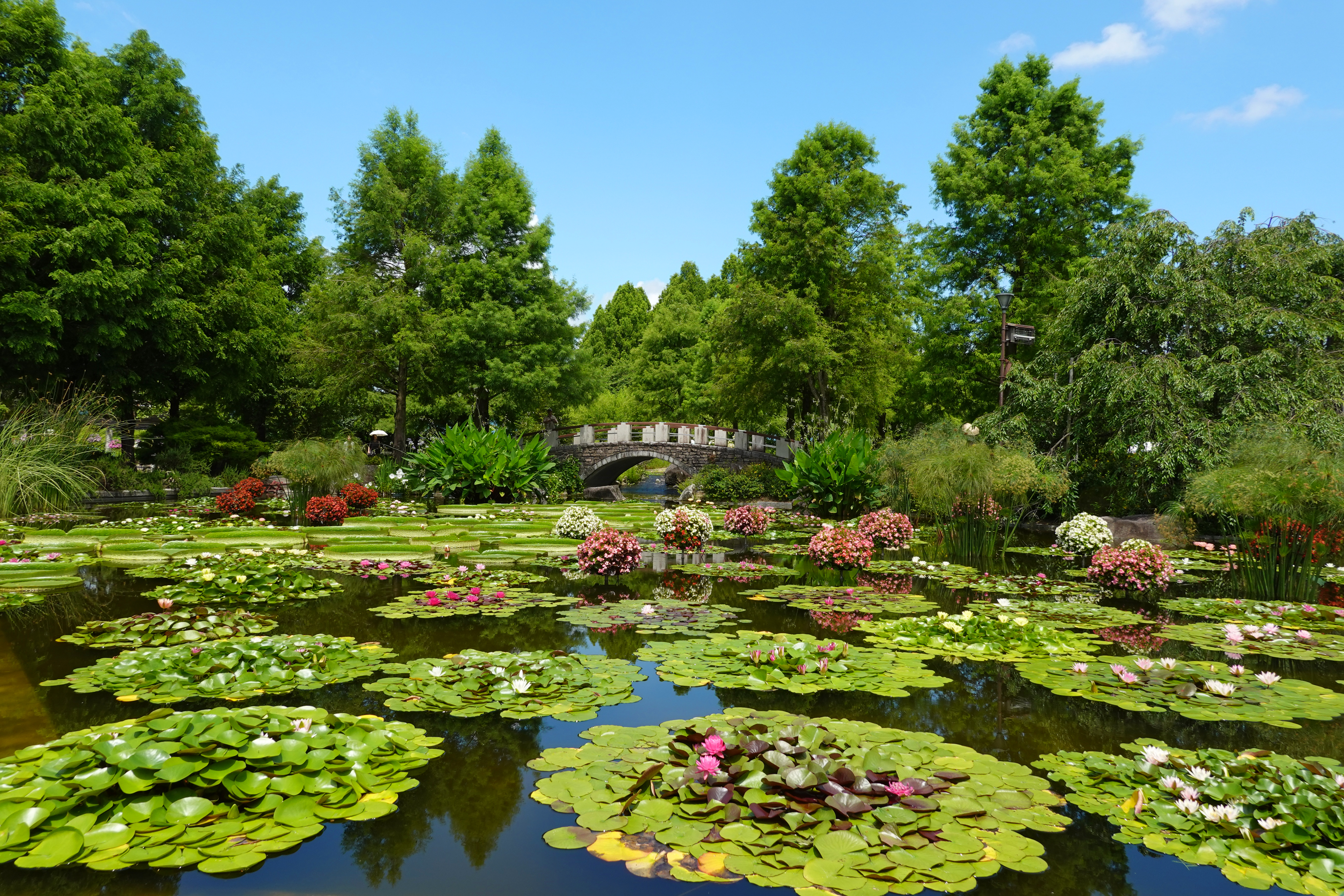
- Lotus plants at the Mizunomori Water Botanical Garden

- Location within Japan
- Type: Botanical garden
- Location: 1091 Oroshimocho, Kusatsu, Shiga
- Coordinates: 35.074078°N 135.940458°E
- Opened: 1996
- Website: https://www.seibu-la.co.jp/mizunomori/

The Mizunomori Water Botanical Garden (草津市立水生植物公園みずの森, Kusatsu Shiritsu Suiseishokubutsu Kōen Mizunomori), also known as the Kusatsu Aquatic Botanical Garden, is a botanical garden specializing in aquatic plants and best known for its extensive lotus display. Mizu-no-mori means "water forest" in Japanese. It is located on Lake Biwa's southeastern shore on the Karasuma Peninsula in Oroshimo-cho, Kusatsu, Shiga, Japan, and open daily except Mondays. An admission fee is charged.

== See also ==
- List of botanical gardens in Japan
