= Kusatsu, Shiga =

Kusatsu 草津市
- City
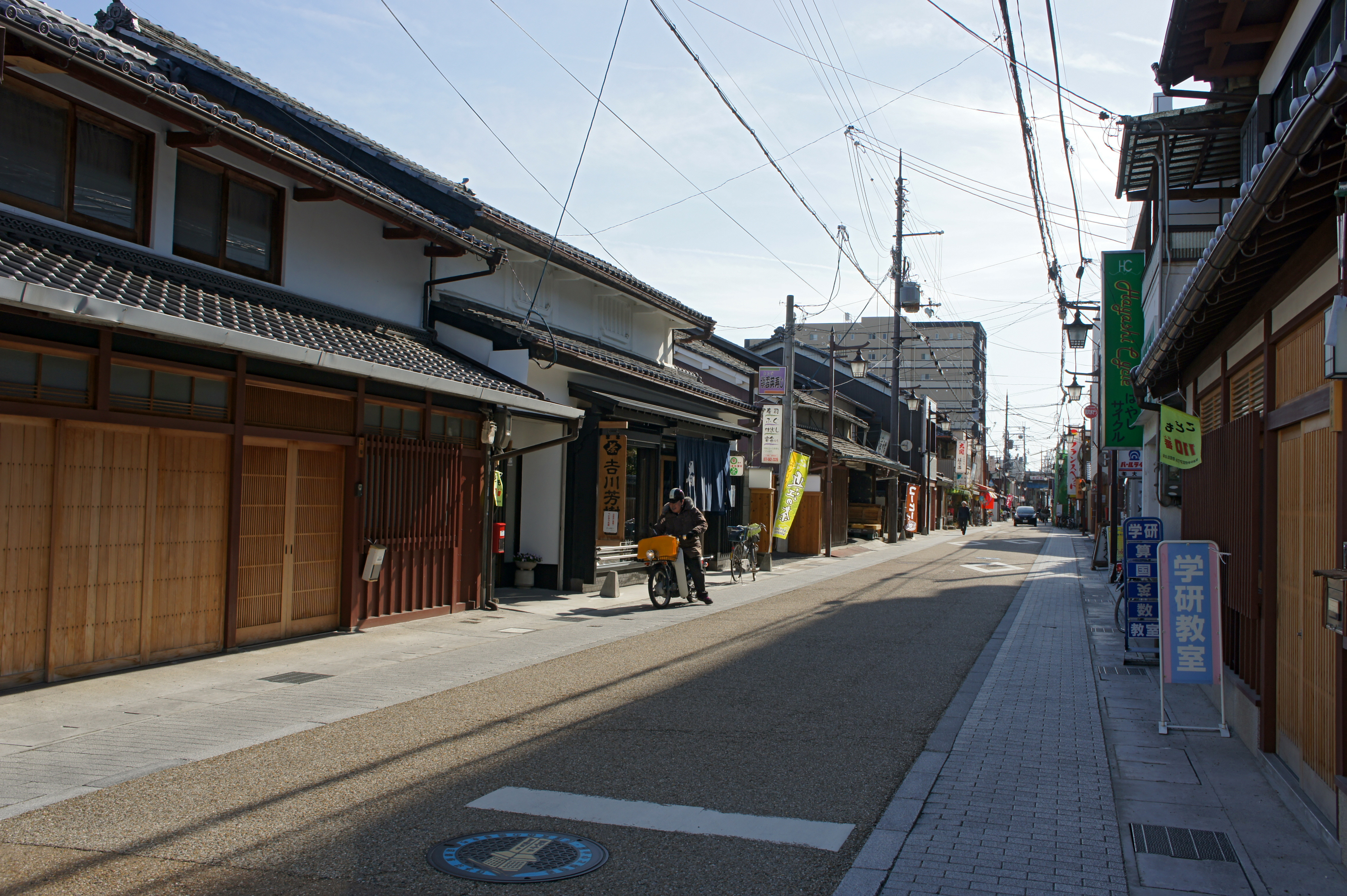

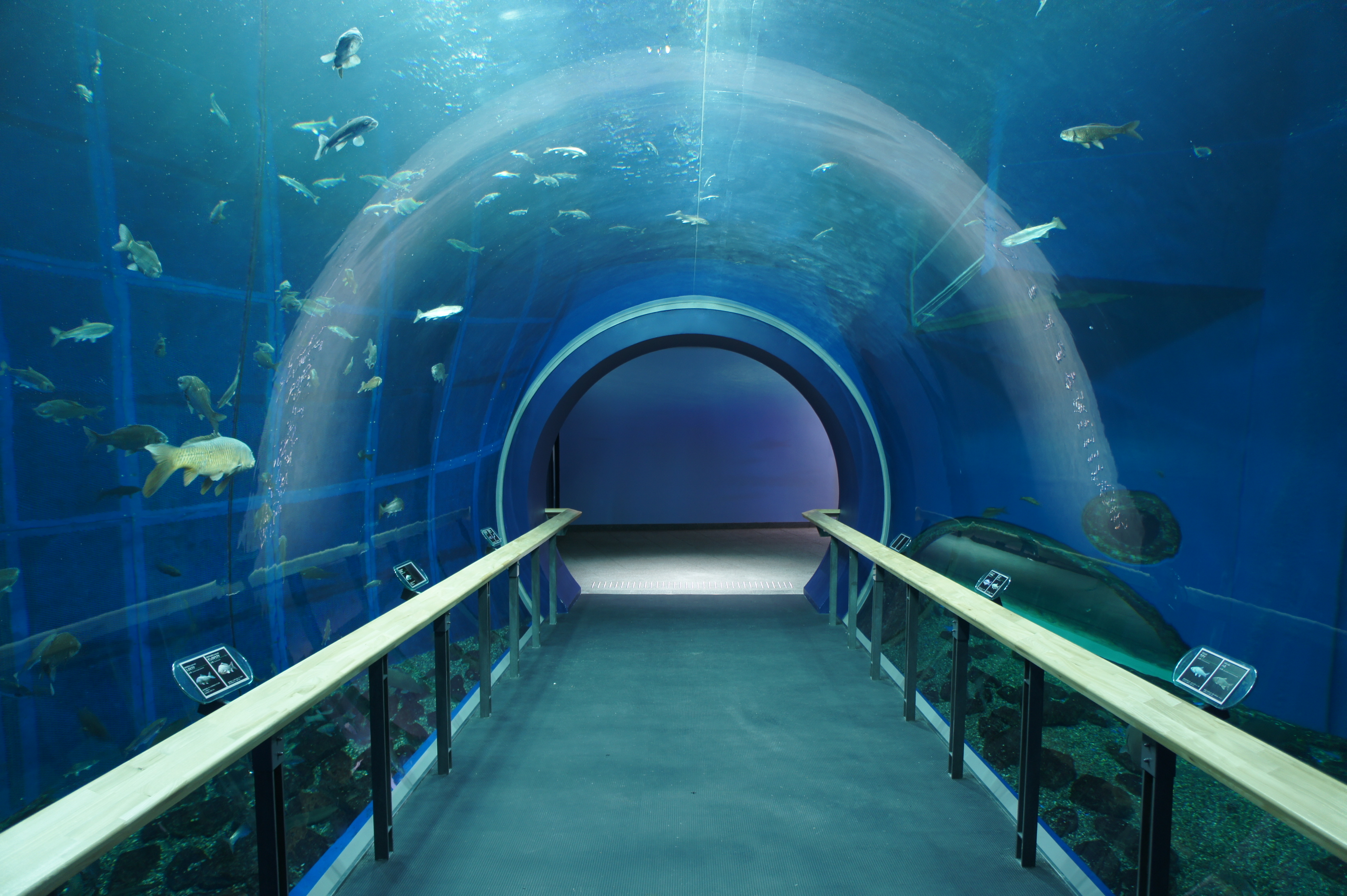

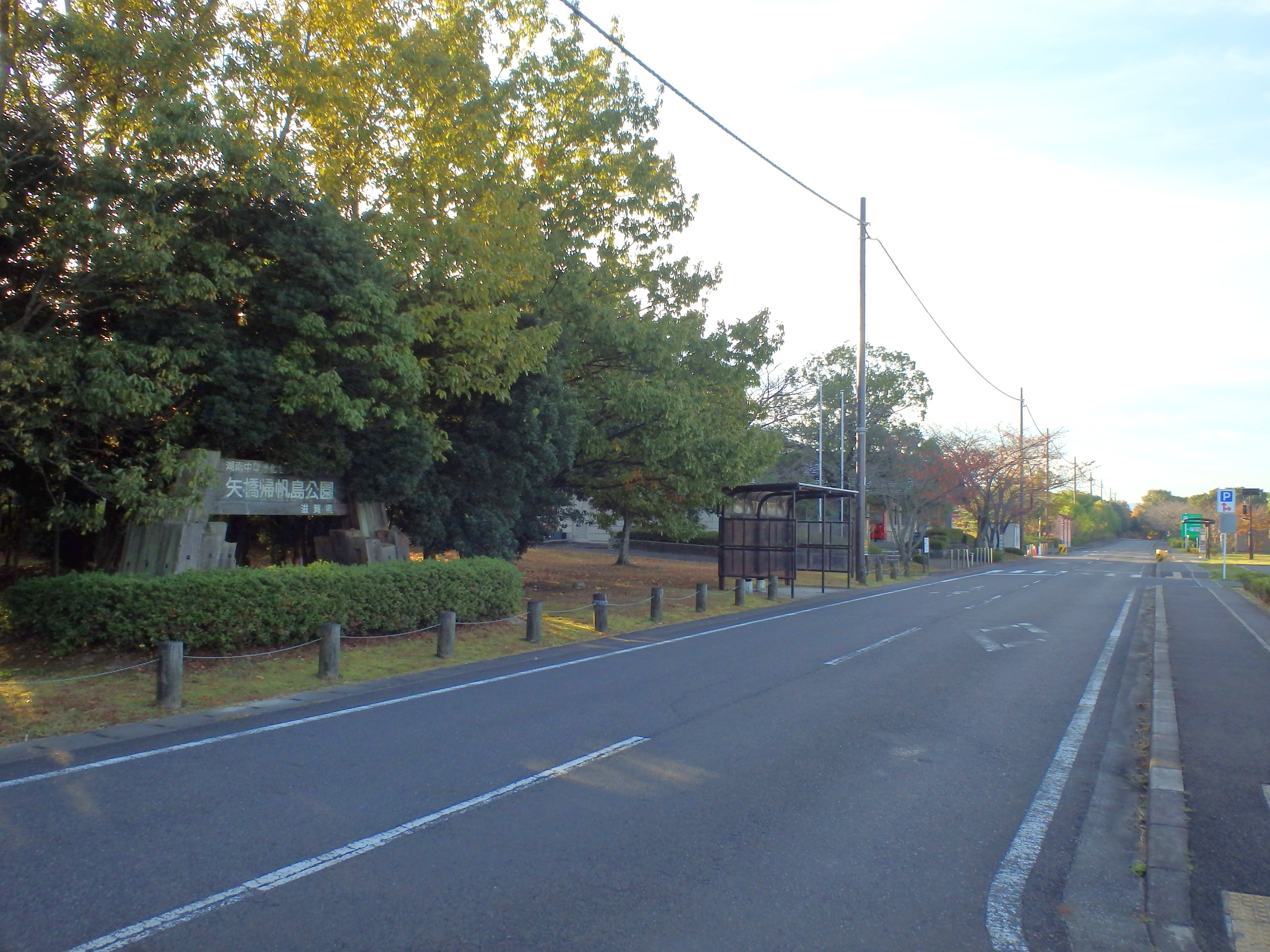

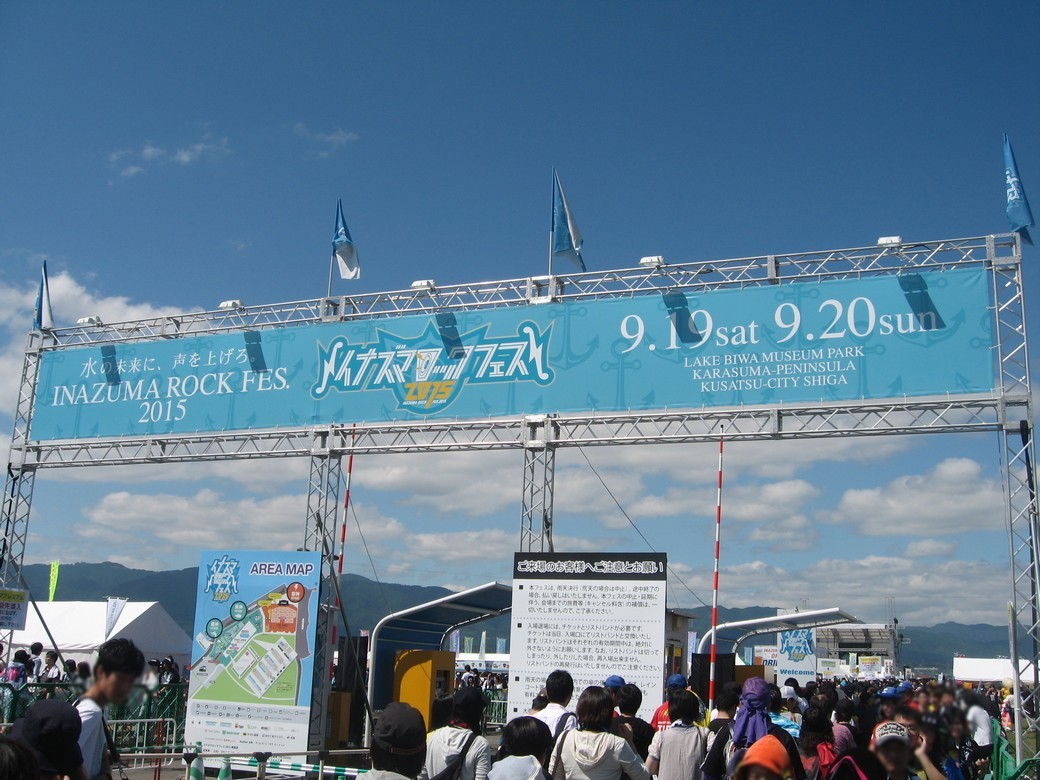

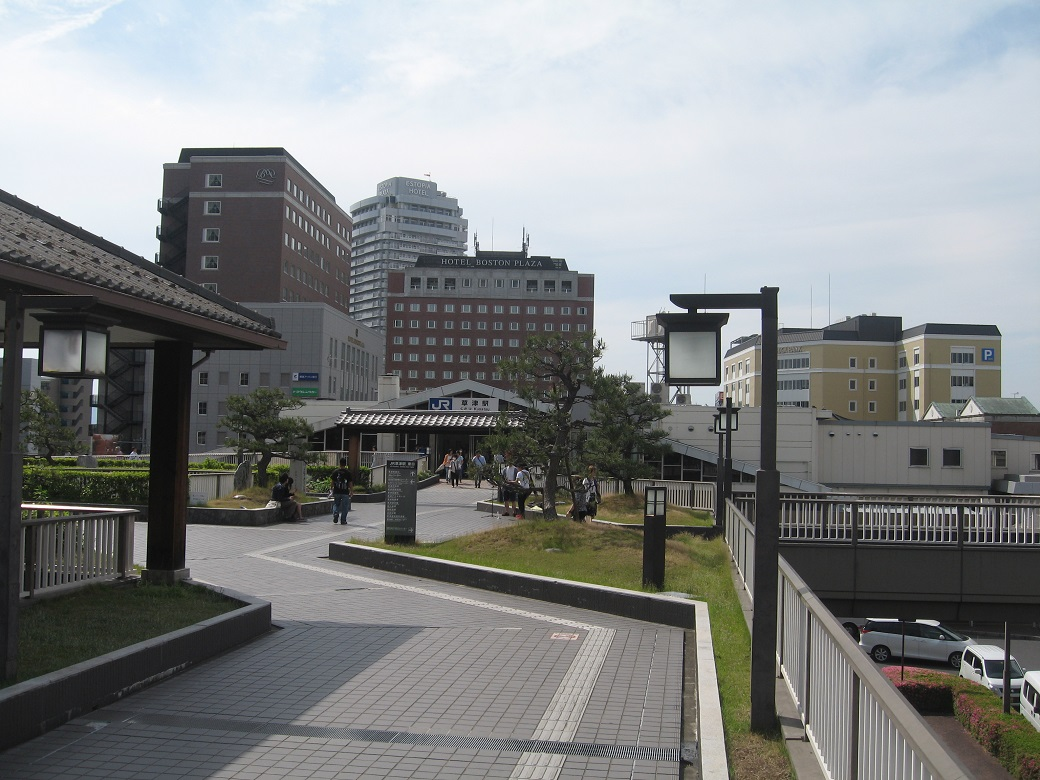
Kusatsu-juku	Lake Biwa Museum
Yabaseki Peninsula Park	Inazuma Rock Festival
Kusatsu Station plaza
- Flag Emblem

- Location of Kusatsu in Shiga Prefecture

- Location in Japan
- Coordinates: 35°1′N 135°58′E
- Country: Japan
- Region: Kansai
- Prefecture: Shiga
- First official recorded: late 4th century (estimated)
- Kusatsu town settled: June 22, 1895
- Kusatsu city settled: October 15, 1954

Government
  - Mayor: Chiyo Komai (駒井千代)- from October 2026｝

Area
  - Total: 67.82 km^{2} (26.19 sq mi)

Population (January 31, 2024)
  - Total: 139,913
  - Density: 2,063/km^{2} (5,343/sq mi)
- Time zone: UTC+09:00 (JST)
- City hall address: 3-13-30, Kusatsu, Kusatsu-shi, Shiga-ken; 525-8588
- Website: Official website
- Symbols
- Flower: Aobana (Commelina communis L. var. hortensis Makino)
- Tree: Sweet Osmanthus

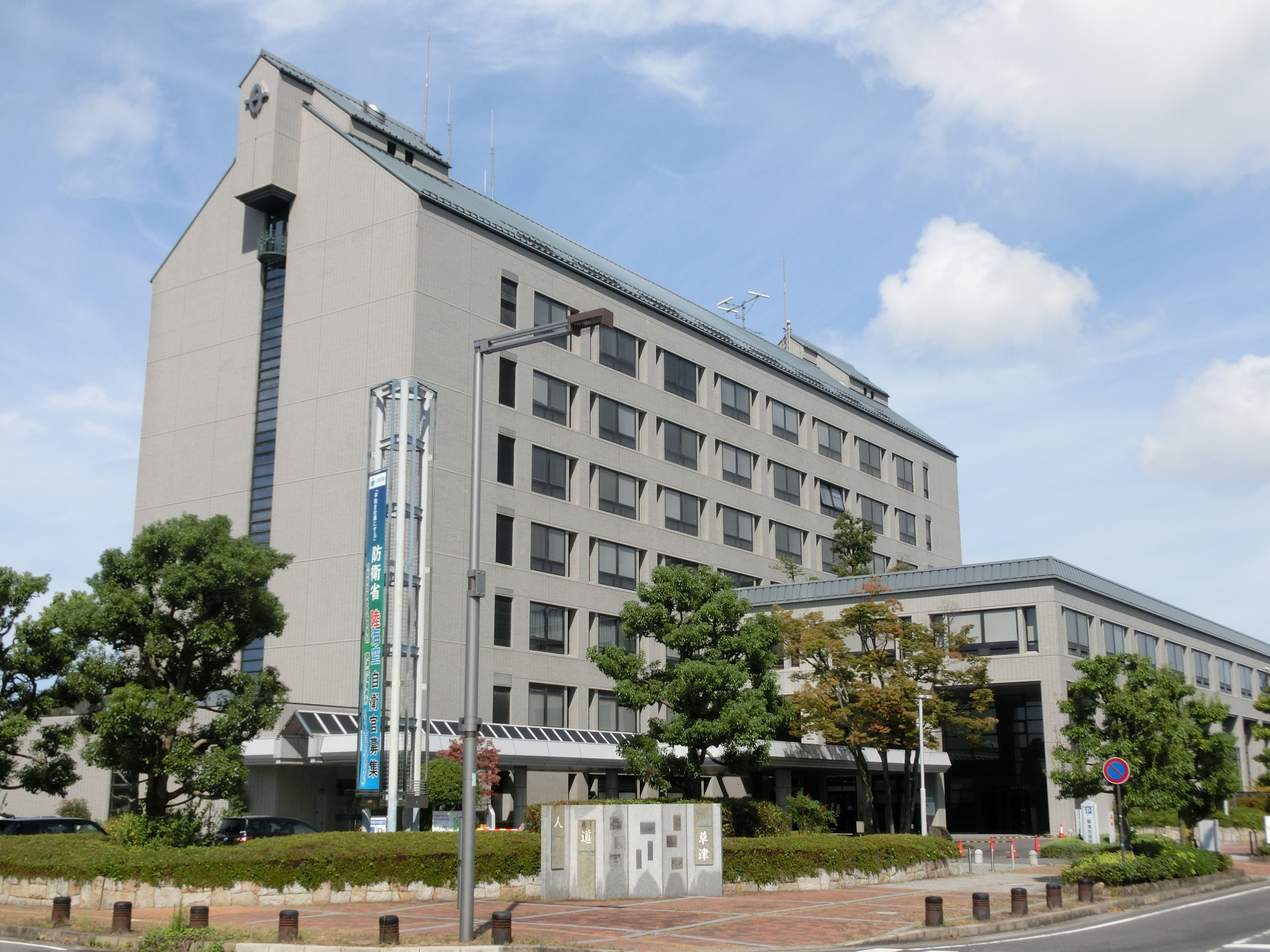
Kusatsu City Hall

Kusatsu (草津市, Kusatsu-shi) is a city located in Shiga Prefecture, Japan. The city lies on Lake Biwa, Japan's largest freshwater lake. As of 31 January 2024, the city had an estimated population of 139,913 in 63,942 households and a population density of 2100 persons per km^{2}. The total area of the city is 67.82 square kilometres (26.19 sq mi). The city is often confused with Kusatsu, Gunma Prefecture, which is a famous hot spring resort.

== Geography ==
Kusatsu is located in southern Shiga Prefecture, on the southeastern shore of Lake Biwa.

=== Neighboring municipalities ===
Shiga Prefecture

- Moriyama
- Ōtsu
- Rittō

=== Climate ===
Kusatsu has a humid subtropical climate (Köppen Cfa) characterized by warm summers and cool winters with light to no snowfall. The average annual temperature in Kusatsu is 14.0 °C. The average annual rainfall is 1430 mm with September as the wettest month. The temperatures are highest on average in August, at around 26.0 °C, and lowest in January, at around 2.5 °C.

== Demographics ==
Per Japanese census data, the population of Kusatsu has increased steadily over the past century.

Historical population
Year	Pop.	±%
1920	21,990	—
1930	24,190	+10.0%
1940	26,483	+9.5%
1950	32,755	+23.7%
1960	35,022	+6.9%
1970	46,409	+32.5%
1980	77,012	+65.9%
1990	94,767	+23.1%
2000	115,455	+21.8%
2010	130,874	+13.4%
2020	143,913	+10.0%

== History ==
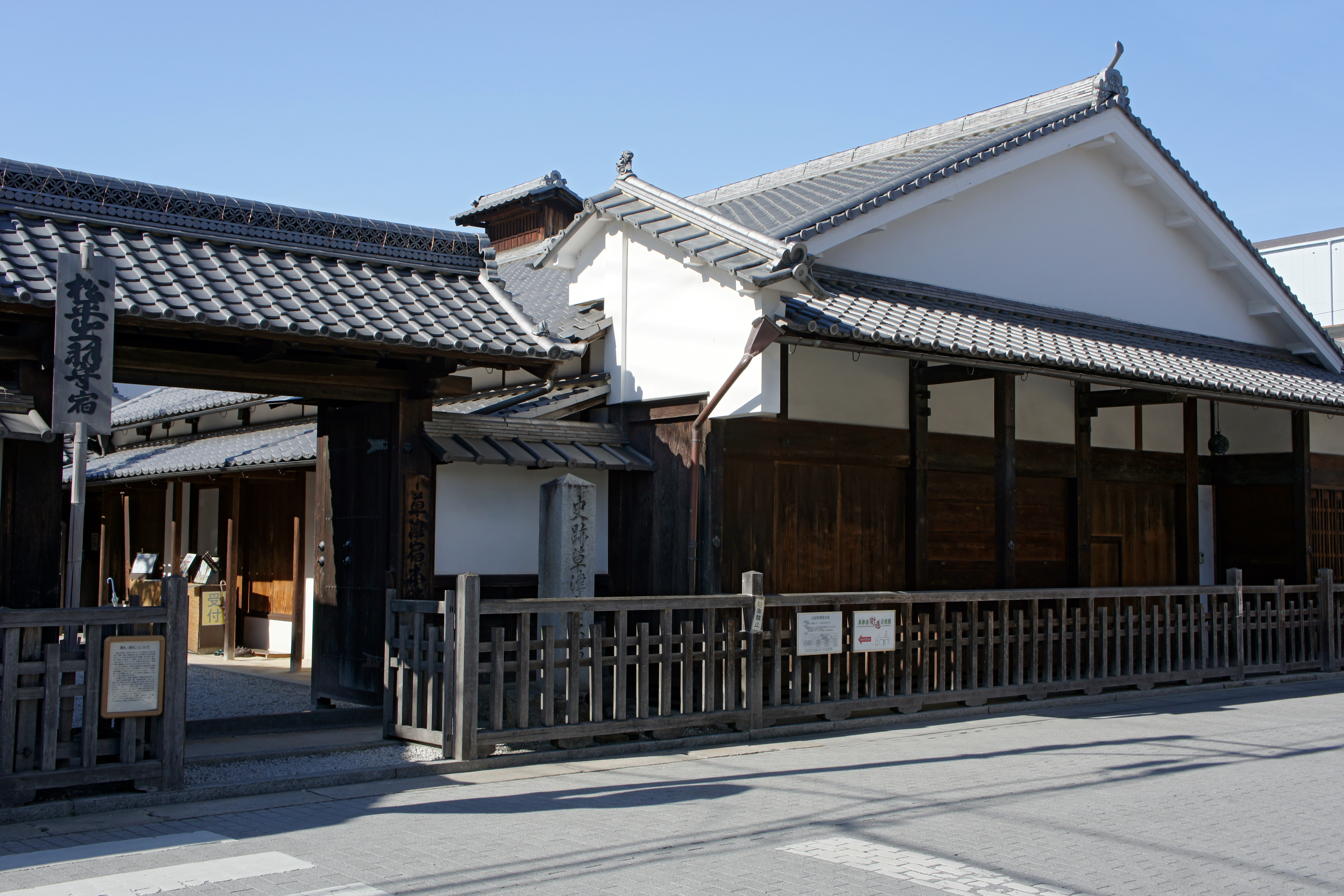
Historical site of Kusatsu-juku.

Kusatsu is part of ancient Ōmi Province. It has been a transportation hub for east-west travel on the ancient Tōsandō and Tōkaidō highways connecting the capital of Heian-kyō with the provinces of eastern Japan from the end of the Nara period onwards. During the Muromachi period, it developed as a relay point between Kyoto and the Ise Grand Shrines. In 1422, when Shogun Ashikaga Yoshimochi made a pilgrimage to Ise, he built a palace, the "Kusatsu Goshō" in this location. Around 1568, Oda Nobunaga forced Ashikaga Yoshiaki to cede the Kusatsu area, which he viewed as strategically critical to controlling the approaches to Kyoto. Nobunaga made extensive road repairs and reconstructed the Seta Bridge. In the early Edo period, the system of post stations on the Nakasendō and Tōkaidō was formalized by the Tokugawa shogunate in 1602. Kusatsu-juku developed at the junction of these two highways as a post town from around this time.

The town of Kusatsu was established within Kurita District, Shiga with the creation of the modern municipalities system on April 1, 1889. On October 15, 1954, Kusatsu merged with the neighboring villages of Shizu, Oikami, Yamada, Kasanei and Tokiwa to form the city of Kusatsu.

== Government ==
Kusatsu has a mayor-council form of government with a directly elected mayor and a unicameral city council of 24 members. Kusatsu contributes four members to the Shiga Prefectural Assembly. In terms of national politics, the city is part of Shiga 3rd district of the lower house of the Diet of Japan.

== Economy ==
Kusatsu is a regional commercial center and an important traffic junction of southern Shiga; Biwako Line, Kusatsu Line, Meishin Expressway, Shin-Meishin Expressway, Japan National Route 1 and Japan National Route 8. The city is 30 minutes from Kyoto and 51 minutes from Osaka, and is classified by the Ministry of Land, Infrastructure, Transport and Tourism as part of the greater Kyoto Metropolitan area, thus has increasingly become a commuter town.

== Education ==
Kusatsu has 14 public elementary schools and six public middle schools operated by the city government and four public high schools operated by the Shiga Prefectural Department of Education. The prefecture also operates one special education school for the handicapped. There are also one private middle school and two private high schools. Ritsumeikan University of Kyoto has a subcampus in Kusatsu.

== Transportation ==
=== Railway ===
JR West – Biwako Line

- Minami-Kusatsu - Kusatsu

JR West – Kusatsu Line

- Kusatsu

=== Highway ===
- Meishin Expressway
- Shin-Meishin Expressway
- National Route 1
- National Route 8

== International relations ==
=== Sister cities ===
Kusatsu is twinned with:

- Pontiac, United States, since 1978
- Kan'onji, Japan

=== Friendship cities ===
- Xuhui District, Shanghai, China

== Local attractions ==
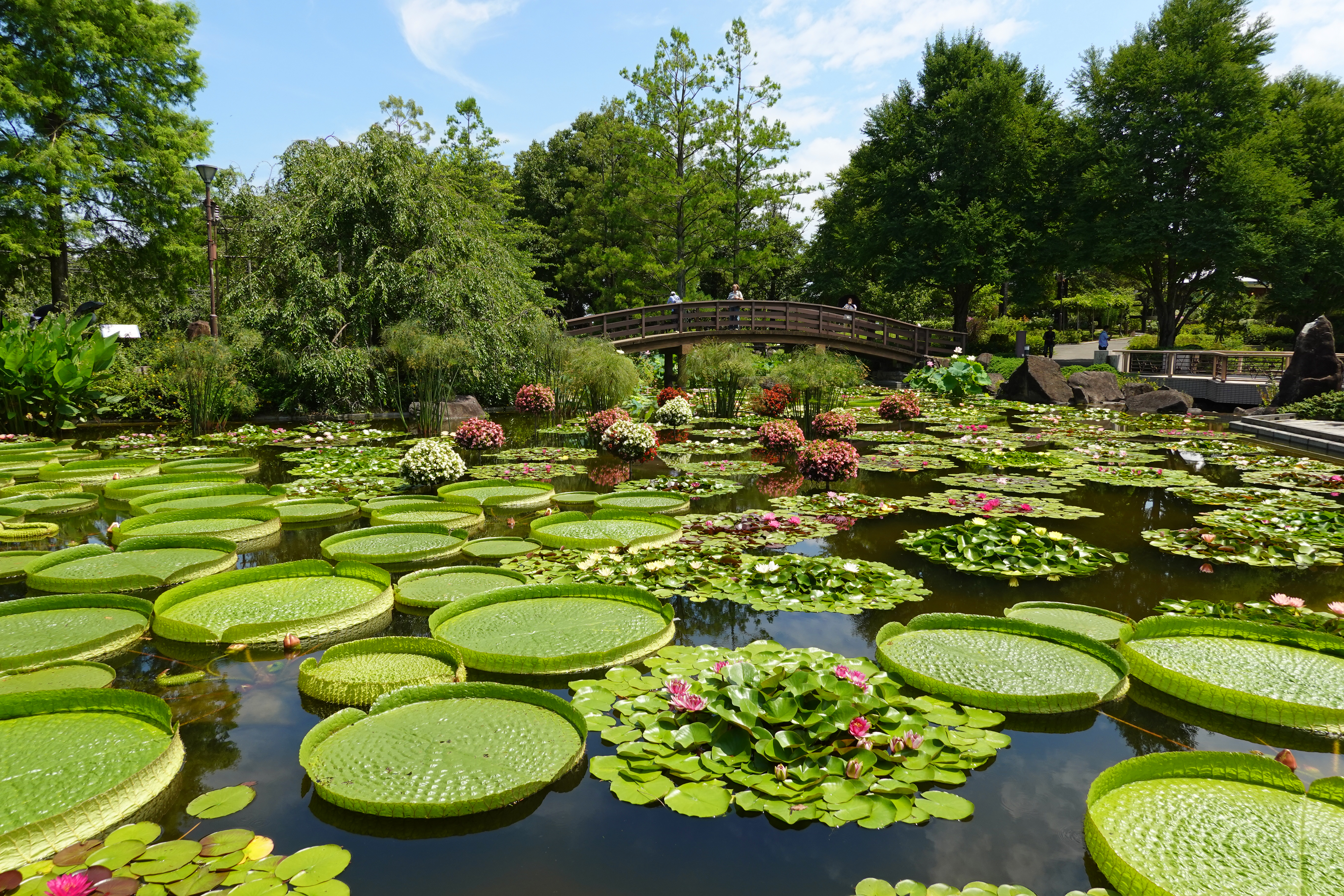
Mizunomori Water Botanical Garden

- Ashiura Kannon-ji, National Historic Site
- Site of Kusatsu-juku, National Historic Site
- Lake Biwa Museum
- Mizunomori Water Botanical Garden
