= Hira Mountains =

- 比良山地; Hira-sanchi
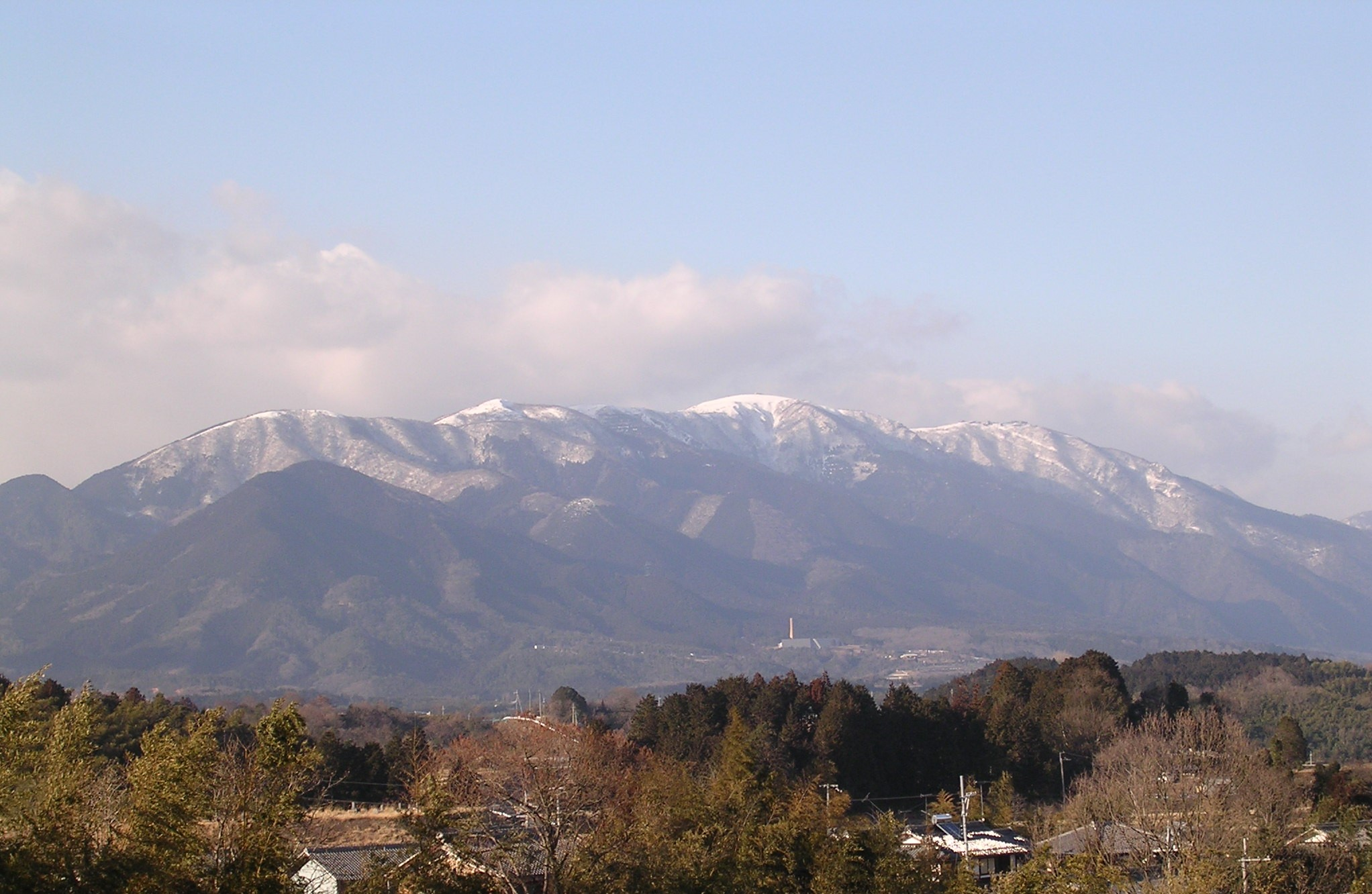
- Hira Mountains in winter

Highest point
- Elevation: 1,214.4 m (3,984 ft)
- Coordinates: 35°15′00″N 135°53′00″E

Naming
- Language of name: Japanese
- Pronunciation: [çiɾa saɲtɕi]

Geography
- Location within Japan
- Location: Shiga Prefecture and Kyoto Prefecture, Honshu, Japan

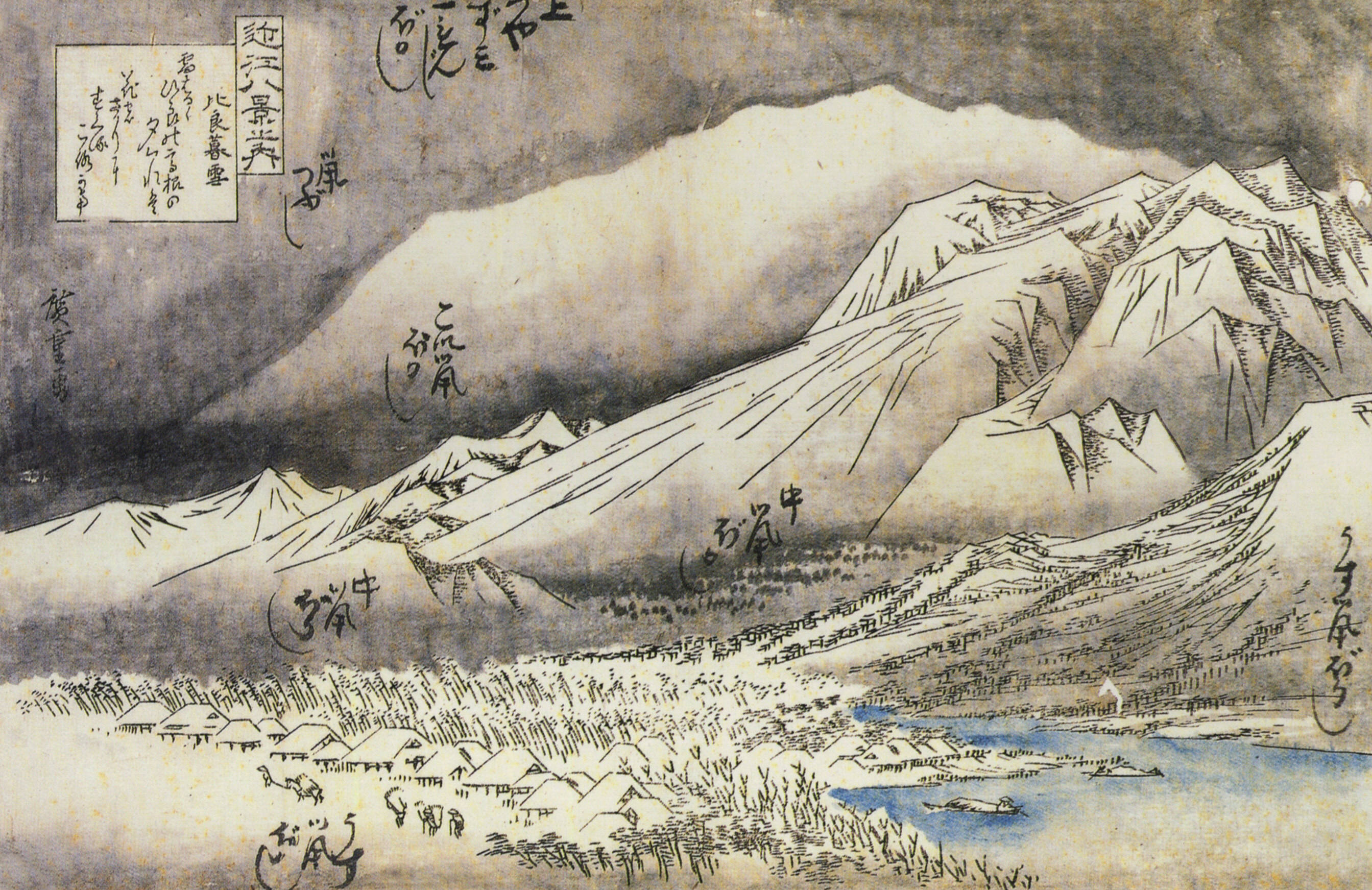
An ukiyo-e picture by Hiroshige

The Hira Mountains (比良山地, Hira-sanchi) are a mountain range to the west of Lake Biwa on the border of Shiga Prefecture and Kyoto Prefecture, Japan. The range runs 15 kilometres (9.3 mi) north to south. It is narrowest in the southern part of the range, running 3 kilometres (1.9 mi) east to west, and broadest at the northern part of the range, running 10 kilometres (6.2 mi) km east to west. The eastern side of the Hira Mountains looks steeply over Lake Biwa, while the western side of the range forms a gentler valley in Kyoto.

The three main peaks of the Hira Mountains are Mount Bunagatake, the highest with an elevation of 1,214.4 metres (3,984 ft); Hōraisan, at 1,174 metres (3,852 ft), and Mount Uchimi at 1,103 metres (3,619 ft).

The spring snow of the Hira Mountains is one of the Eight Views of Ōmi.

== Hira-oroshi ==
A strong local wind Hira-oroshi (比良颪) often blows from Hira Mountains to Lake Biwa especially in the late days of March. The wind sometimes sinks boats on the lake and stops trains of the Kosei Line, a JR line passing along the foot of the mountains. In every 26 March, Tendai priests hold a memorial service for casualties of shipwreck accidents.

== Recreation ==
The Hira Mountains are a popular destination for skiing, hiking, and mountain climbing.
