= Biwako Quasi-National Park =

National park in Kansai

- 琵琶湖国定公園
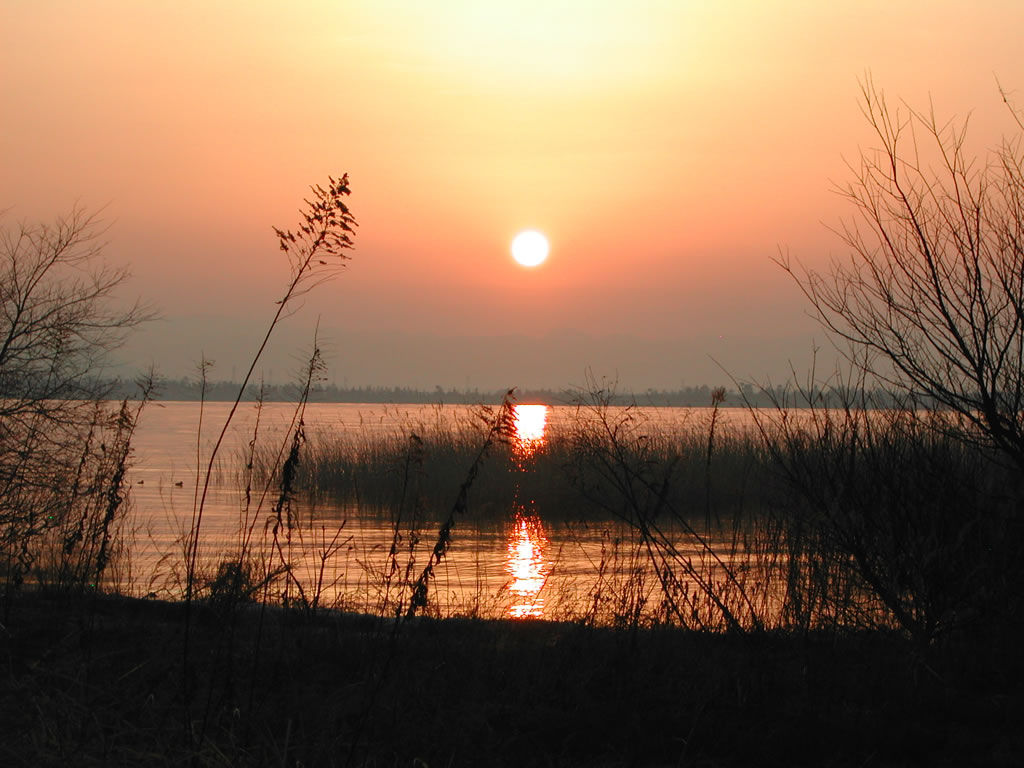
- Lake Biwa

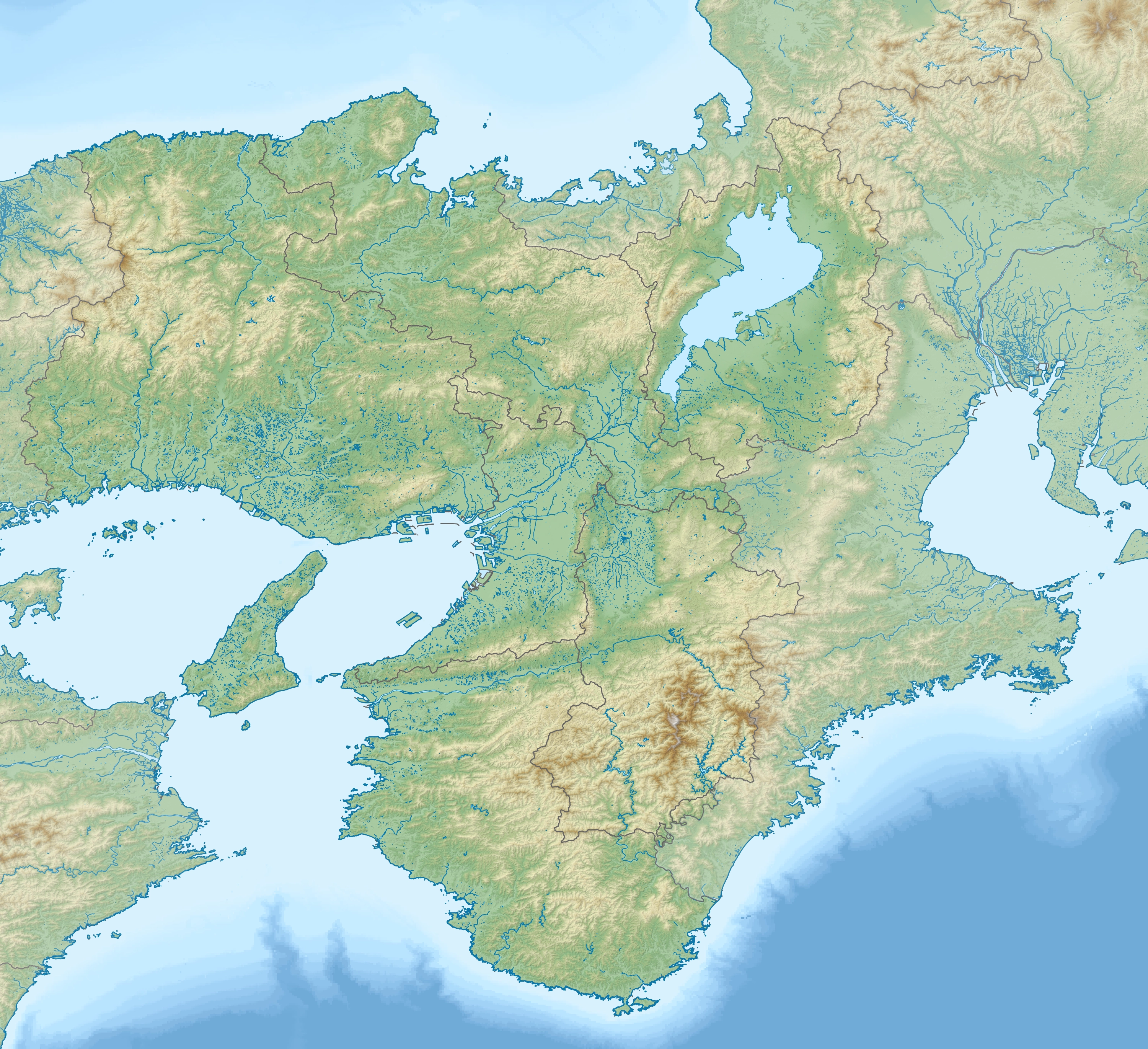
- Location within Kansai region Location within Japan
- Location: Shiga/Kyoto Prefecture, Japan
- Coordinates: 35°21′31.74″N 136°10′17.1″E
- Area: 976.72 km^{2} (377.11 sq mi)
- Established: July 24, 1950

Biwako Kokutei Kōen (琵琶湖国定公園) is a Quasi-National Park in Shiga Prefecture and Kyoto Prefecture, Japan. It was founded on 24 July 1950 and has an area of 976.7 km^{2} (377 sq mi). In June 1993 an area of 65,984 ha beside Lake Biwa was designated a Ramsar Site and wetland of international importance.

== See also ==
- List of national parks of Japan
- Ramsar sites in Japan
