= Lake Biwa =

Largest lake in Japan

- 琵琶湖 (Japanese)
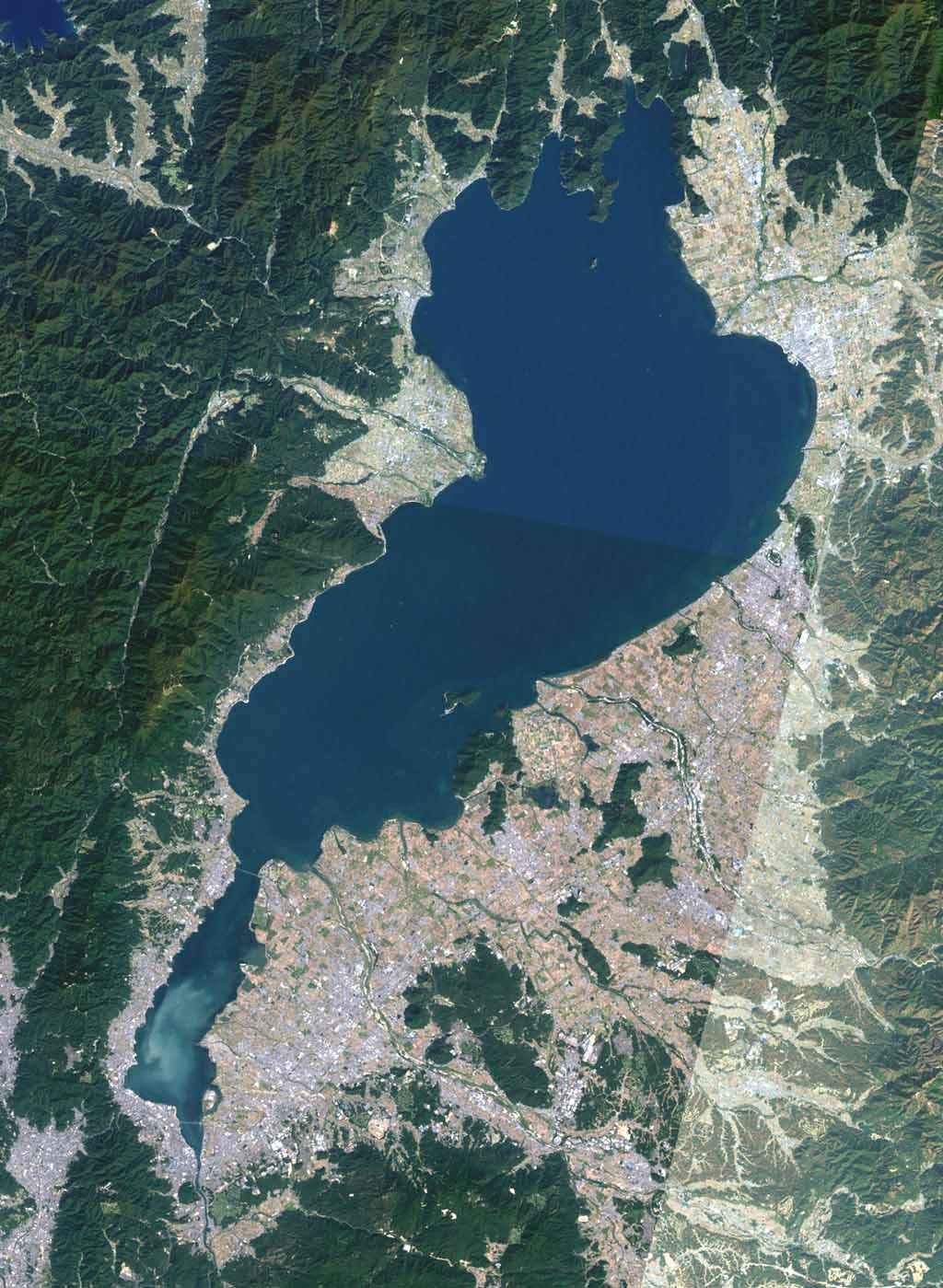
- Lake Biwa from space

- Location within Japan Location within Shiga Prefecture
- Location: Shiga Prefecture, Japan
- Coordinates: 35°15′18″N 136°04′48″E
- Type: Ancient lake, tectonic, freshwater
- Primary inflows: 118 rivers
- Primary outflows: Seta River
- Catchment area: 3,174 km^{2} (1,225 sq mi)
- Basin countries: Japan
- Max. length: 63.49 km (39.45 mi)
- Max. width: 22.8 km (14.2 mi)
- Surface area: 670.3 km^{2} (258.8 sq mi)
- Average depth: 41 m (135 ft)
- Max. depth: 104 m (341 ft)
- Water volume: 27.5 km^{3} (6.6 cu mi)
- Residence time: 5.5 years
- Shore length^{1}: 235.2 km (146.1 mi)
- Surface elevation: 85.6 m (281 ft)
- Islands: Chikubu, Takeshima, Okishima (inhabited)
- Settlements: Higashiōmi, Hikone, Kusatsu, Maibara, Moriyama, Nagahama, Ōmihachiman, Ōtsu, Takashima, Yasu

Ramsar Wetland
- Official name: Biwa-ko
- Designated: June 10, 1993
- Reference no.: 617
- ^{1} Shore length is not a well-defined measure.

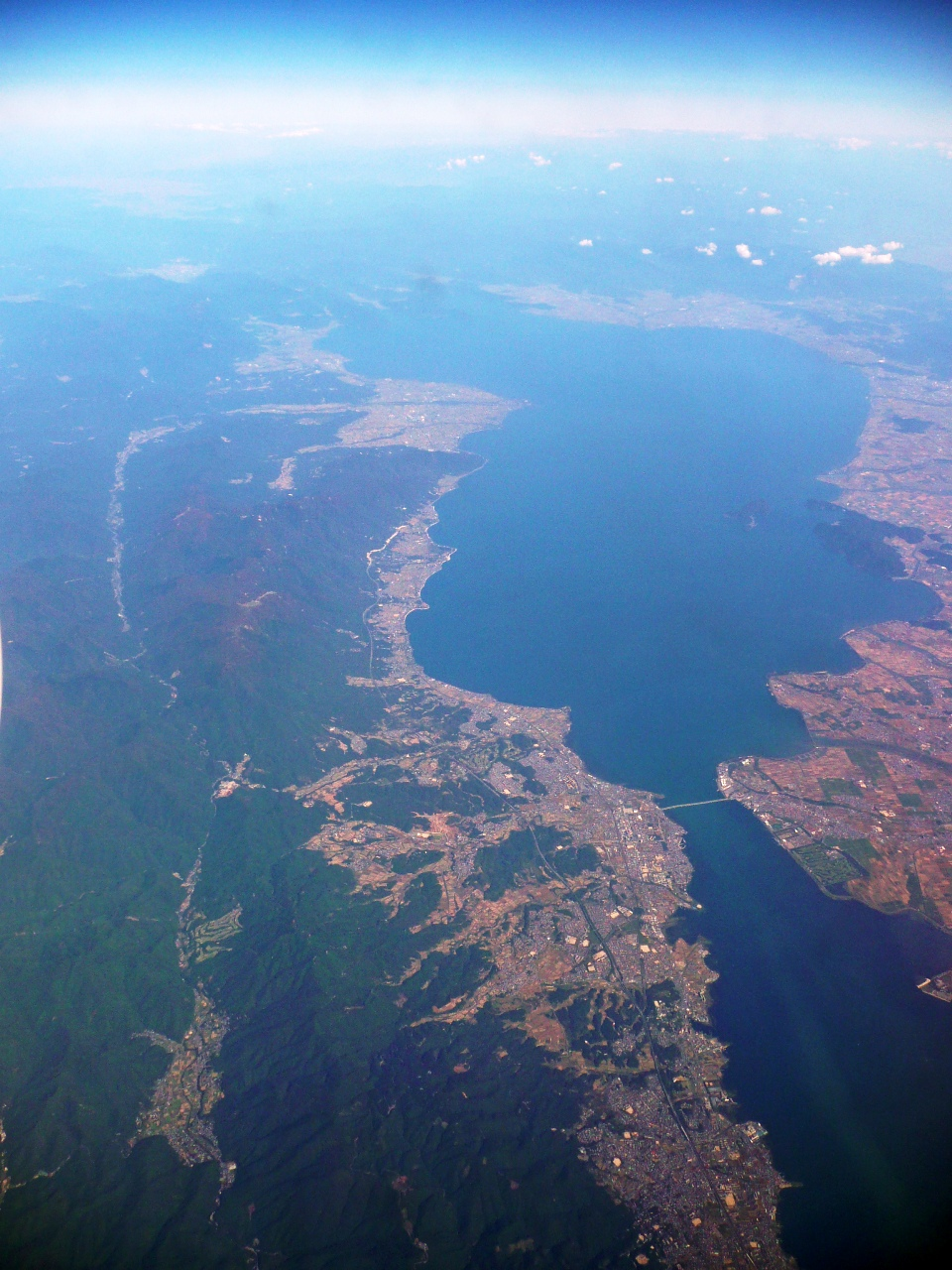
Lake Biwa aerial view

Lake Biwa (Japanese: 琵琶湖, Hepburn: Biwa-ko) is the largest freshwater lake in Japan. It is located entirely within Shiga Prefecture (west-central Honshu), northeast of the former capital city of Kyoto. Lake Biwa is an ancient lake, over 4 million years old. It is estimated to be the 13th oldest lake in the world. Because of its proximity to the country's historical capital Kyoto, references to Lake Biwa appear frequently in Japanese literature, particularly in poetry and in historical accounts of battles.

== Name ==
The name Biwa-ko was established in the Edo period. There are various theories about the origin of the name Biwa-ko, but it is generally believed to be so named because of the resemblance of its shape to that of a stringed instrument called the biwa, and indeed, they use the same kanji: 琵琶 (biwa). Kōsō, a learned monk of Enryaku-ji in the 14th century, gave a clue to the origin of the name Biwa-ko in his writing: "The lake is the Pure Land of the goddess Benzaiten because she lives on Chikubu Island and the shape of the lake is similar to that of the biwa, her favorite instrument."

The lake was formerly known as Aumi (淡海, Freshwater Sea) or Chikatsu Awa-umi (近淡海, Freshwater Sea Near [the Capital]). The current pronunciation of this word has become Ōmi, as in the name of Ōmi Province. The lake is also called Nio no Umi (鳰の海, "Little Grebe Lake") in literature.

== Area and use ==
The area of this lake is about 670 km^{2} (260 sq mi). Small rivers drain from the surrounding mountains into Lake Biwa. Its main outlet is the Seta, which later becomes the Uji, combining with the Katsura and Kizu to become the Yodo River, which flows into the Seto Inland Sea at Osaka Bay.

It serves as a reservoir for the cities of Kyoto and Ōtsu and is a valuable resource for nearby textile industries. It provides drinking water for about 15 million people in the Kansai region. Lake Biwa is a breeding ground for freshwater fish, including trout, and for the pearl culture industry.

The Lake Biwa Canal, built in the late 1890s and later expanded during the Taishō era, played a crucial role in the revival of Kyoto's industrial life after a steep decline following the transfer of the capital to Tokyo.

Lake Biwa is home to many popular beaches along the northwestern shore, in particular Shiga and Ōmi-Maiko. The Mizunomori Water Botanical Garden and the Lake Biwa Museum in Kusatsu are also of interest.

The Lake Biwa Marathon took place annually in Ōtsu, the city at the southern end of the lake, from 1962 until 2021.

== Natural history ==
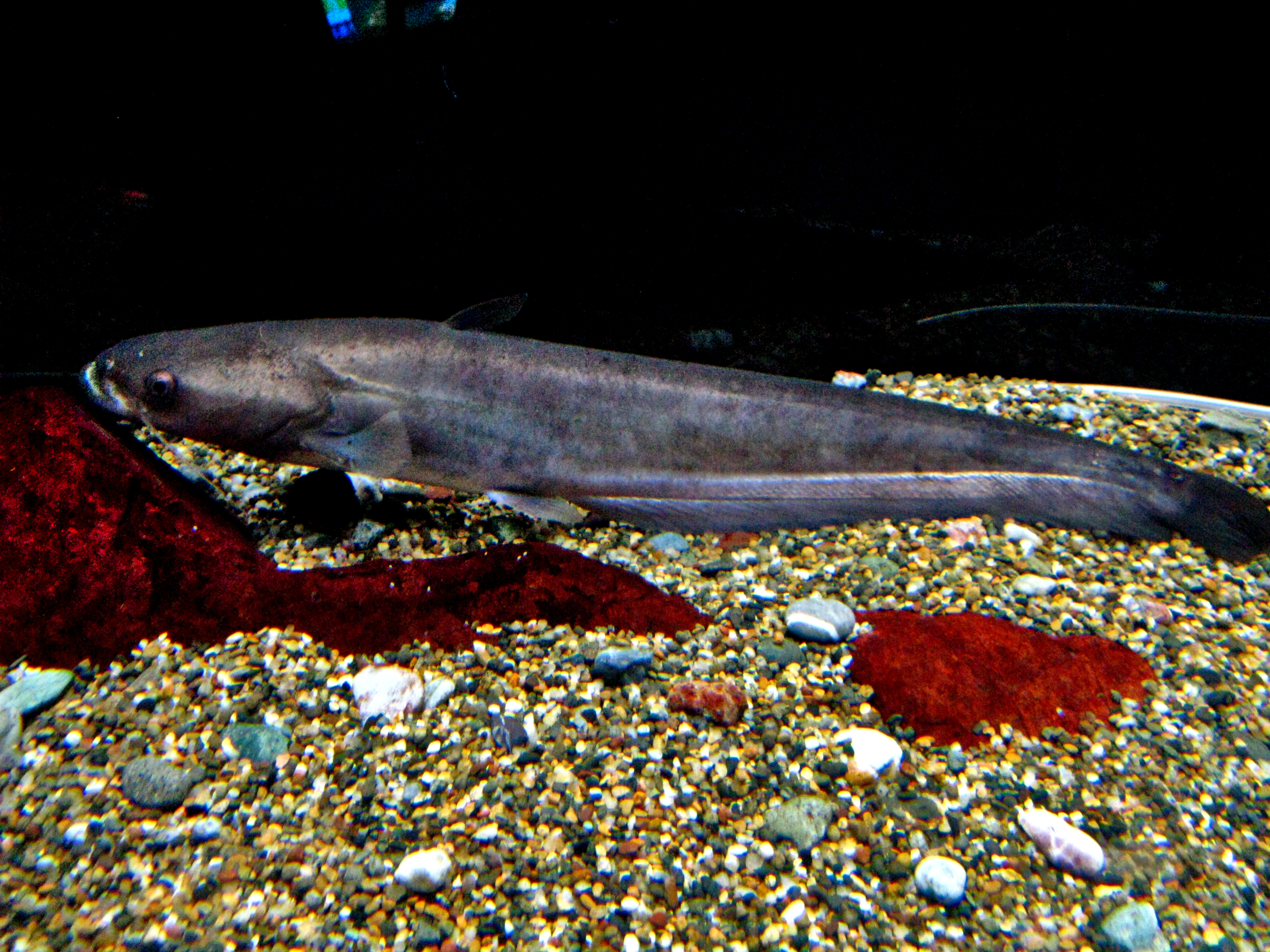
The giant Lake Biwa catfish is the largest predatory fish in the lake and is found nowhere else.

Lake Biwa is of tectonic origin and is one of the world's oldest lakes, dating to at least 4 million years ago (mid-Pliocene). This long, uninterrupted period has allowed for a notably diverse ecosystem to evolve in the lake. Naturalists have documented more than 1000 species and subspecies in the lake, including about sixty endemics. Lake Biwa is an essential place for water birds. About 5,000 waterbirds visit Biwa every year.

There are 46 native fish species and subspecies in the lake, including eleven species and five subspecies that are endemic or near-endemic. The endemic species are five cyprinids (Carassius cuvieri, Gnathopogon caerulescens, Ischikauia steenackeri, Opsariichthys uncirostris and Sarcocheilichthys biwaensis), a true loach (Cobitis magnostriata), two gobies (Gymnogobius isaza and Rhinogobius biwaensis), two silurid catfish (Silurus biwaensis and S. lithophilus) and a cottid (Cottus reinii).

The Biwa trout is also endemic to the lake, but some maintain that it is a subspecies of the widespread masu rather than a separate species. The remaining endemic fish are subspecies of Nigorobuna, Cobitis minamorii, Sarcocheilichthys variegatus, and a local variety of Khanka gudgeon. (Note: The subspecies differentiation may not be recognized, for example, by the current FishBase.)

Lake Biwa is also the home of a large number of molluscs, including 38 freshwater snails (19 endemic) and 16 bivalves (nine endemic).

Recently, the biodiversity of the lake has suffered greatly due to invasive species of foreign fish, particularly black bass and bluegill. Black bass were introduced in 1925 as a game fish. In July 2009, a largemouth bass weighing 10.12 kg (22 lb 4 oz) was caught from Biwa by Manabu Kurita. It has been officially certified by the International Game Fish Association (IGFA) to tie the largemouth bass world record, held solely by George Perry for 77 years. During a visit to Chicago in 1966, Mayor Richard J. Daley presented live bluegills to then-Prince Akihito, an avid ichthyologist; they were later released into lakes in Japan as a game fish.

"At that time, we had not experienced any serious invasive species problems and bluegill did not look dangerous according to its feeding habits, not being a fierce piscivore," says Nakai Katsuki, a Japanese research scientist at the Lake Biwa Museum who has studied invasive North American fish species in Japan's Shiga Prefecture since 1989.

== Archaeology ==
The Awazu site, a submerged shell midden, is an important archaeological site of the Jōmon period. It goes back to the beginning of the Initial Jōmon period (c. 9300 BCE). It lies near the southern end of Lake Biwa, close to Ōtsu, at a depth of two to three meters from the bottom.

The site shows the use of plant and animal food resources by the Jōmon people. It also highlights the significance of nut consumption during this period.

Awazu Midden 3 is dated to the Middle Jōmon (3520–2470 BCE). An abundance of horse chestnuts were uncovered here (about 40% of their total estimated diet). This indicates that by this later period, a sophisticated processing technology had been mastered to remove the harmful tannic acid and make this food safe for consumption.

Ishiyama-dera is another such site, but dating to the Early Jōmon (5000-3520 BCE) on Lake Biwa.

== Environmental legislation ==
Various environmental laws cover Lake Biwa:

=== Eutrophication prevention ===
At the prefectural level, the Eutrophication Control Ordinance was enacted in 1979. It was intended to control industrial pollution from the use of synthetic detergents by companies and residents alike, following a successful citizens' campaign known as the Soap Movement, which had emerged from women's consumer groups earlier in the 1970s.

Legislation to prevent eutrophication was enacted in 1981 and first enforced on July 1, 1982; therefore, this day is called "Lake Biwa Day (びわ湖の日, Biwako no Hi)". The legislation established standards for nitrogen and phosphorus levels in agricultural, industrial, and household water sources that empty into the lake. They also banned the use and sale of synthetic detergents containing phosphorus.

=== Wetlands protection ===
The lake was designated as a UNESCO Ramsar Wetland (1993) in accordance with the Ramsar Convention. The object of this treaty is to protect and sensibly use internationally valuable wetlands. The Kushiro marsh (釧路湿原, Kushiro Shitsugen) in Japan is under this treaty now.

=== Conservation of Reed Vegetation Zones ===
Reed colonies on the shore give Lake Biwa its characteristic scenery. The reeds play an essential role in purifying water and providing habitat for birds and fish. At one time, there were large areas of reeds along the shores of Lake Biwa, which local government surveys recently found had halved in size due to encroaching development. This Shiga Ordinance for the Conservation of Reed Vegetation Zones, which protects, grows, and utilizes reed beds, has been in force since 1992.

== Gallery ==
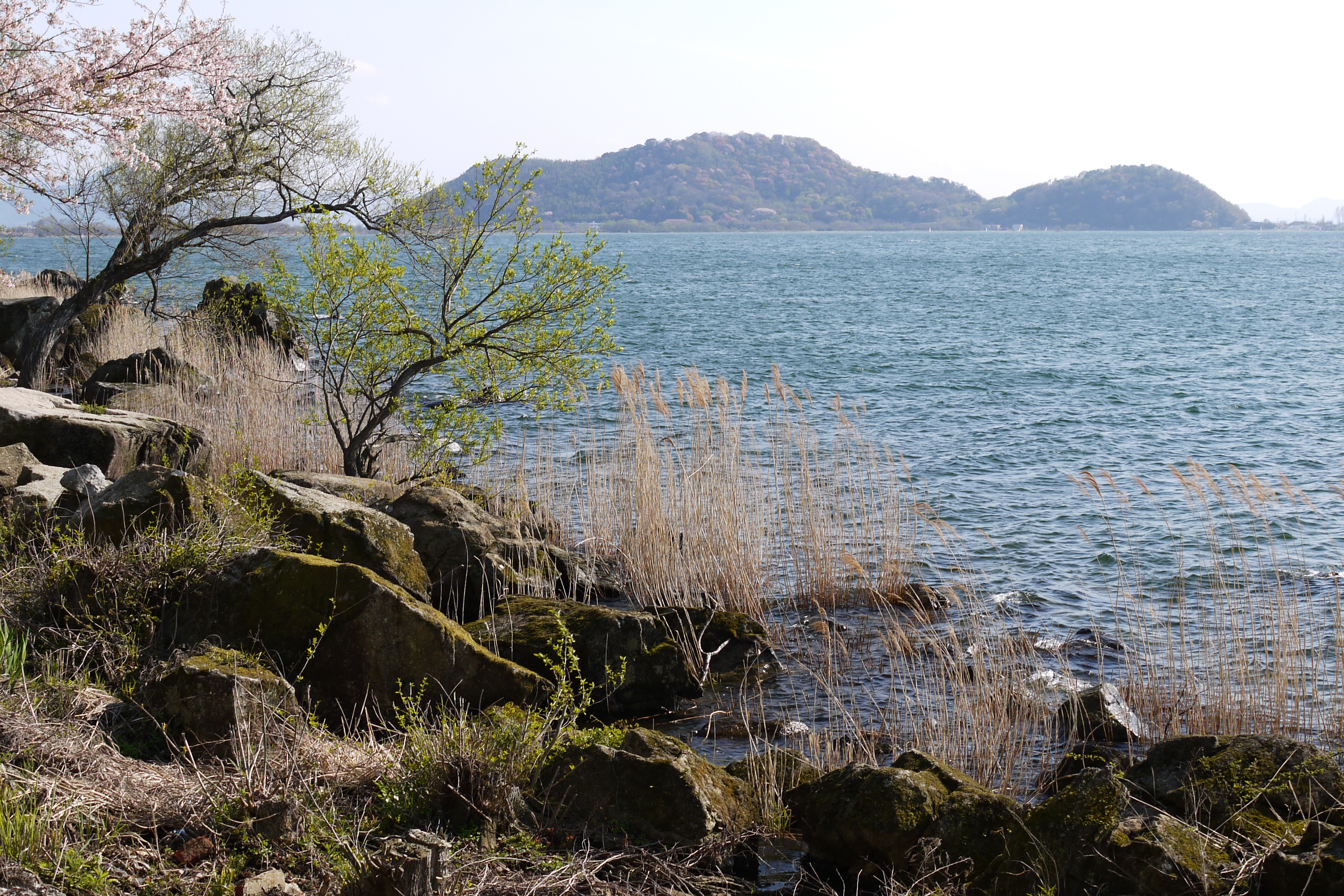
Lake Biwa at Chomeiji-cho, Ōmihachiman

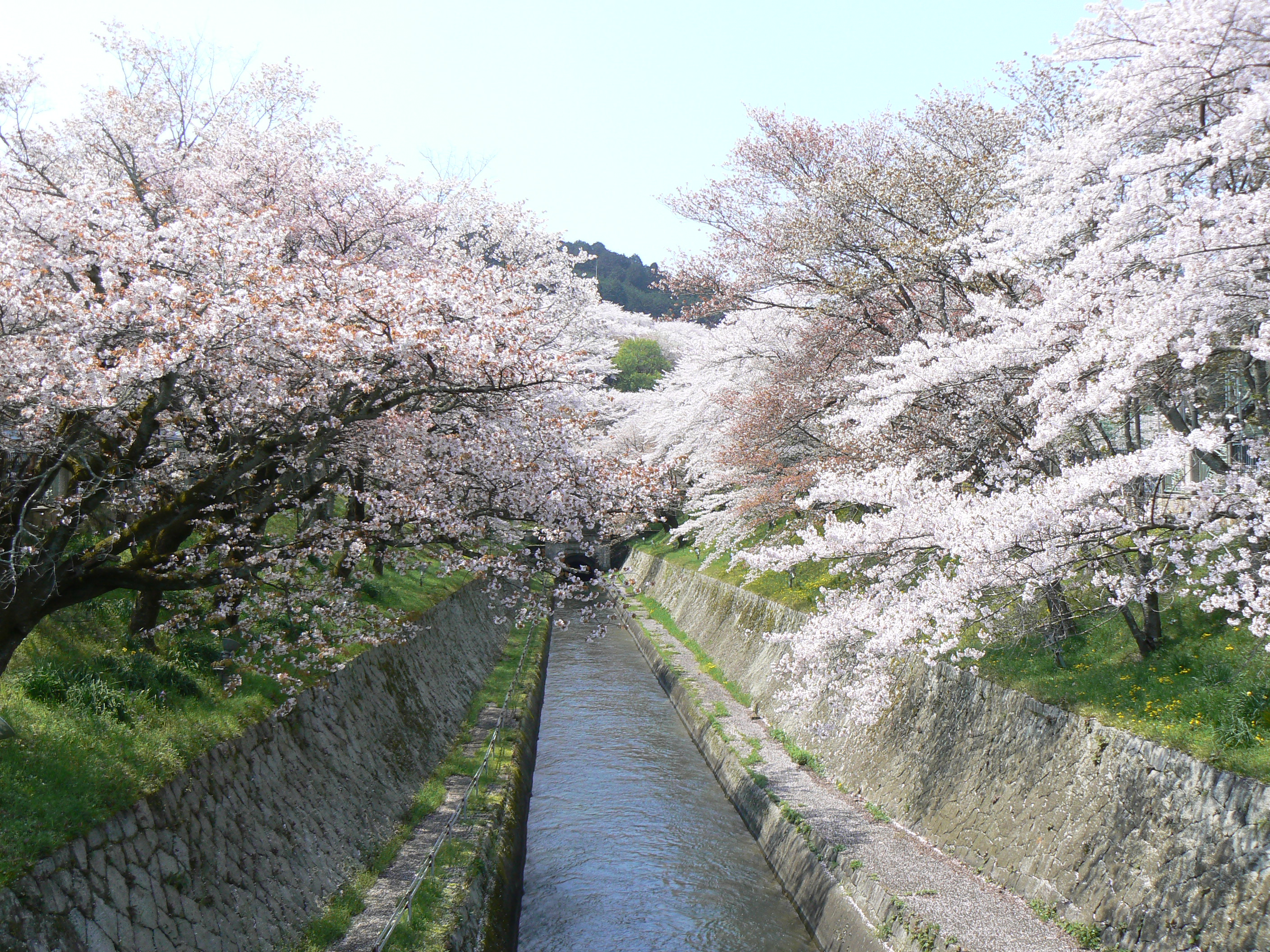
Lake Biwa Canal

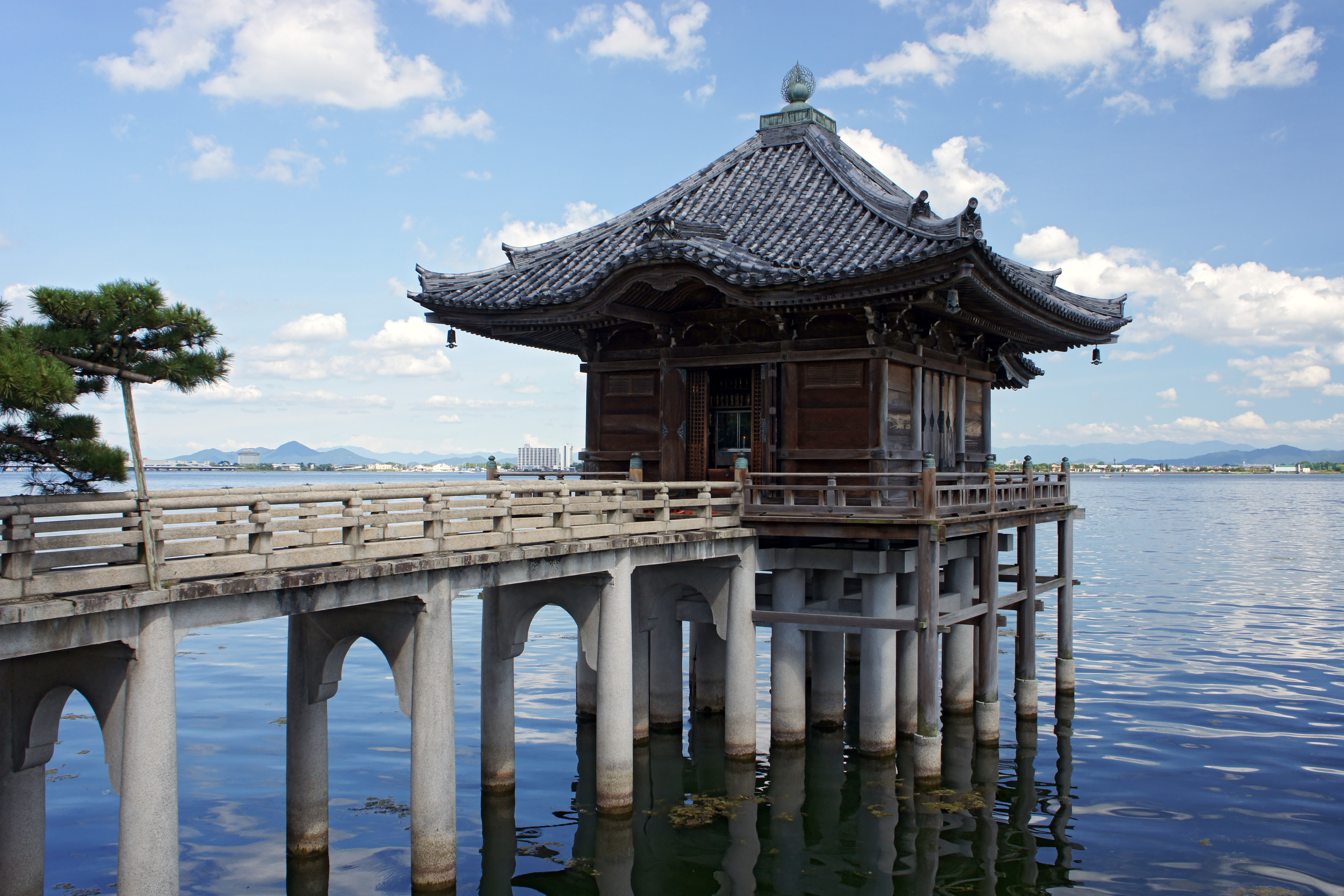
Mangetsu-ji temple, one of the Eight Views of Omi

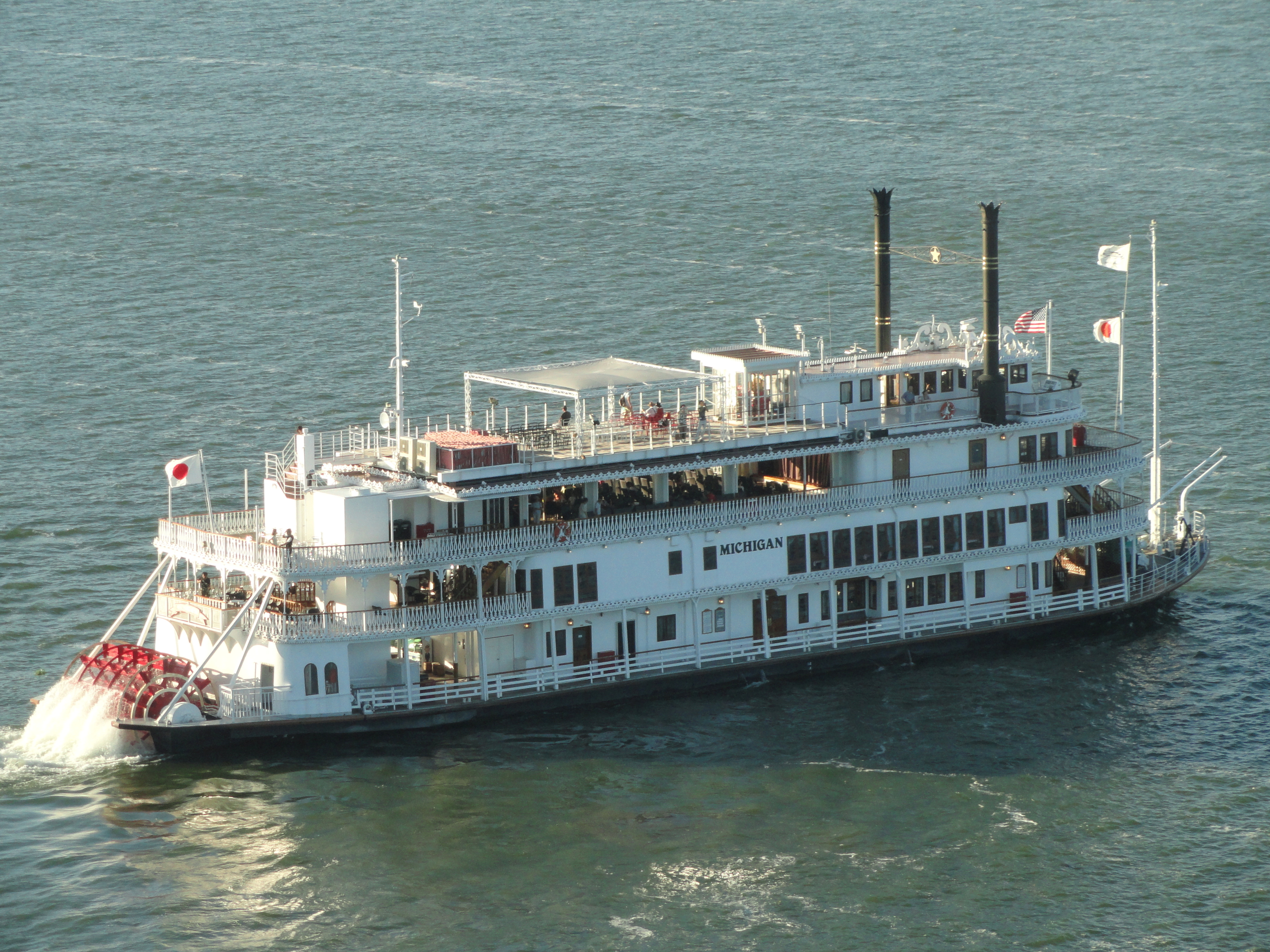
A pleasure boat from Ōtsu Port

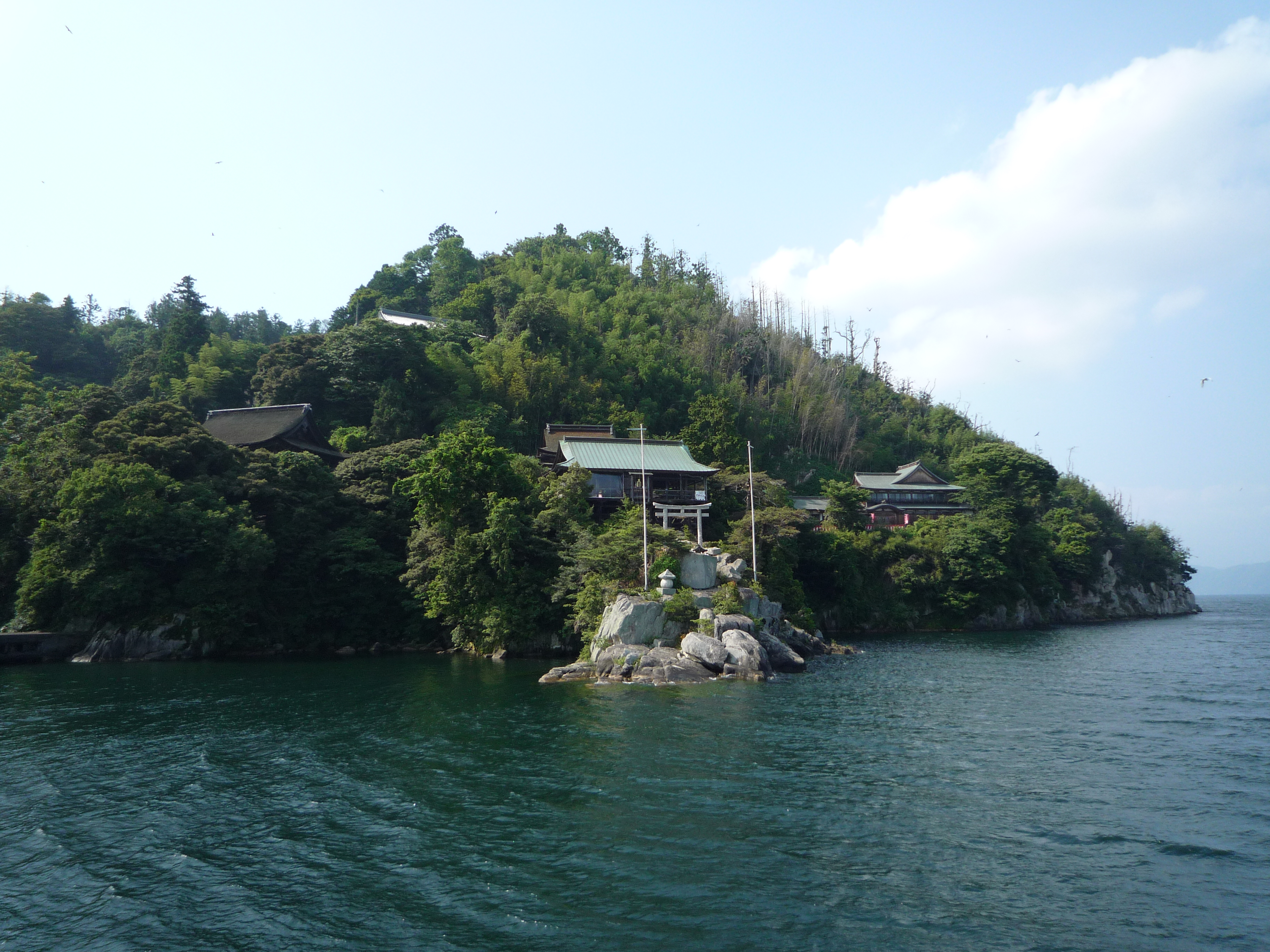
Chikubu Island

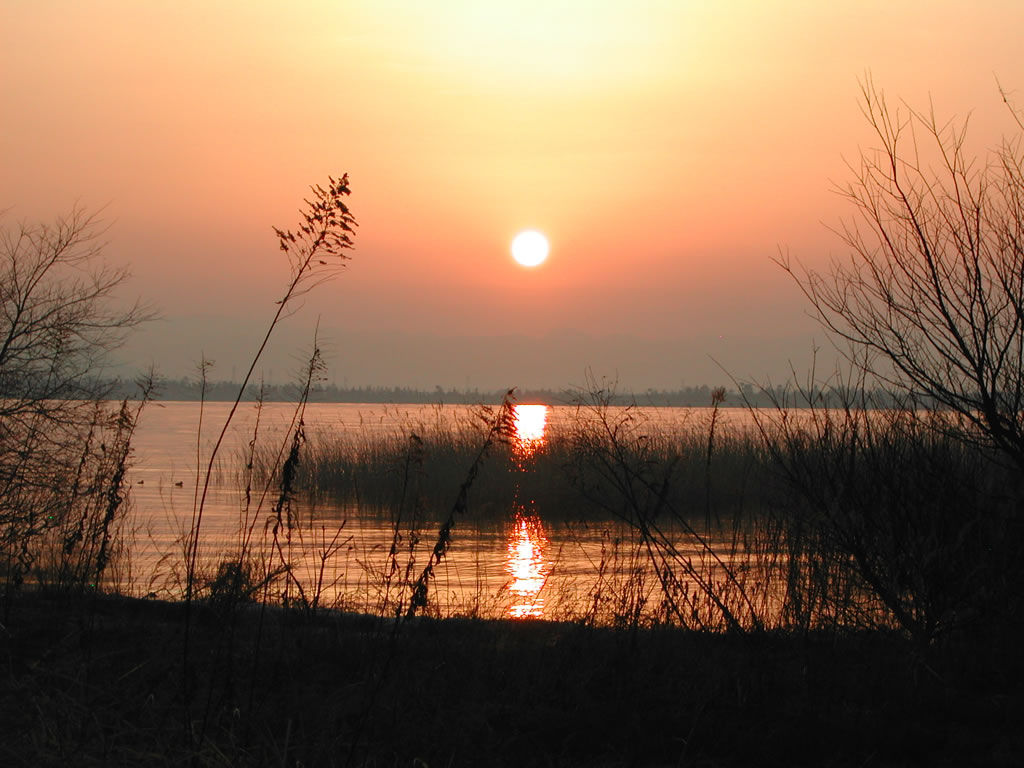
Sunrise over Lake Biwa

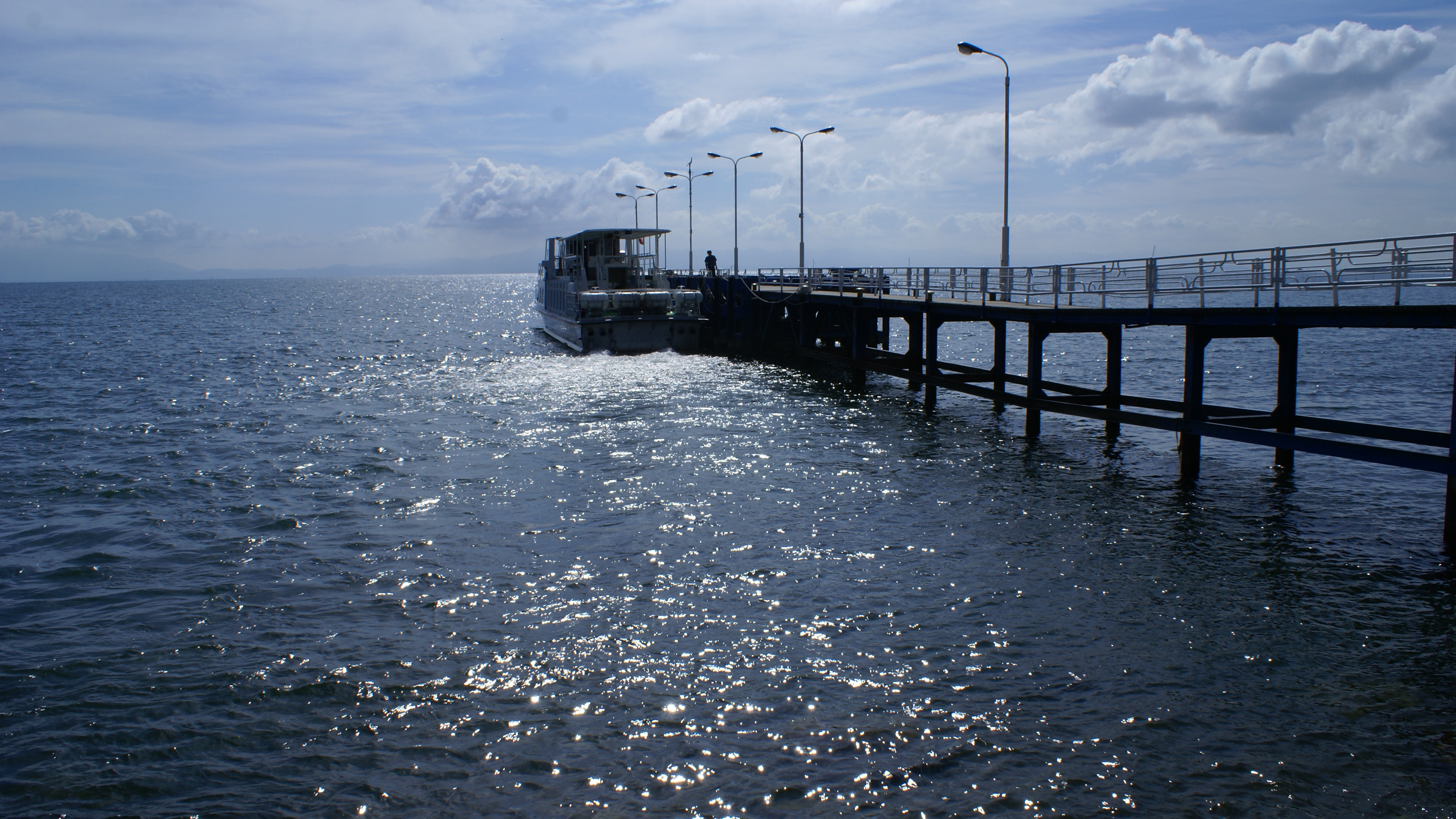
Imazu Port, Takashima

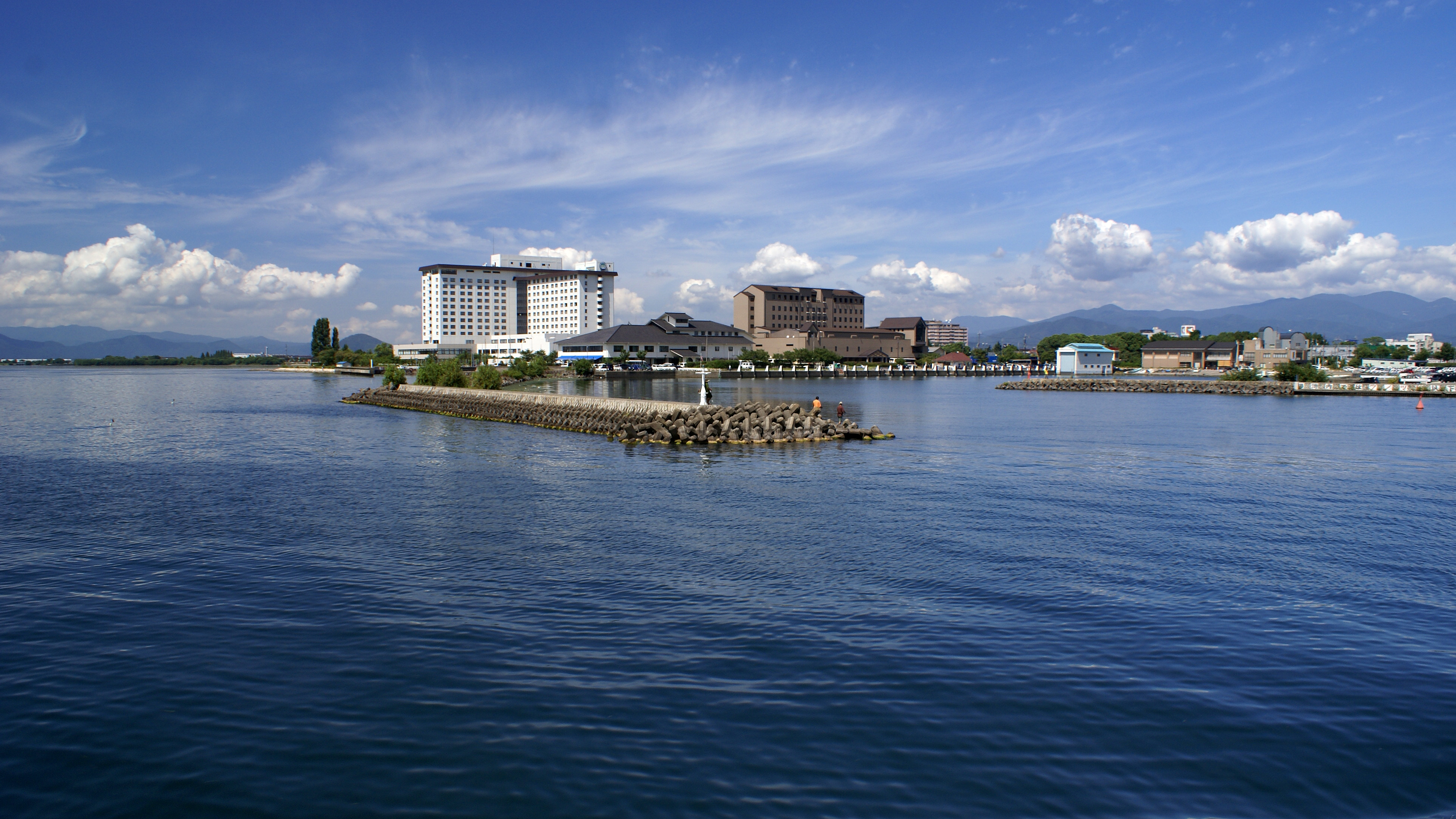
Nagahama Port

A snowy Lake Biwa seen from an airplane window and a not snowy Lake Biwa seen from a ferry, 2022

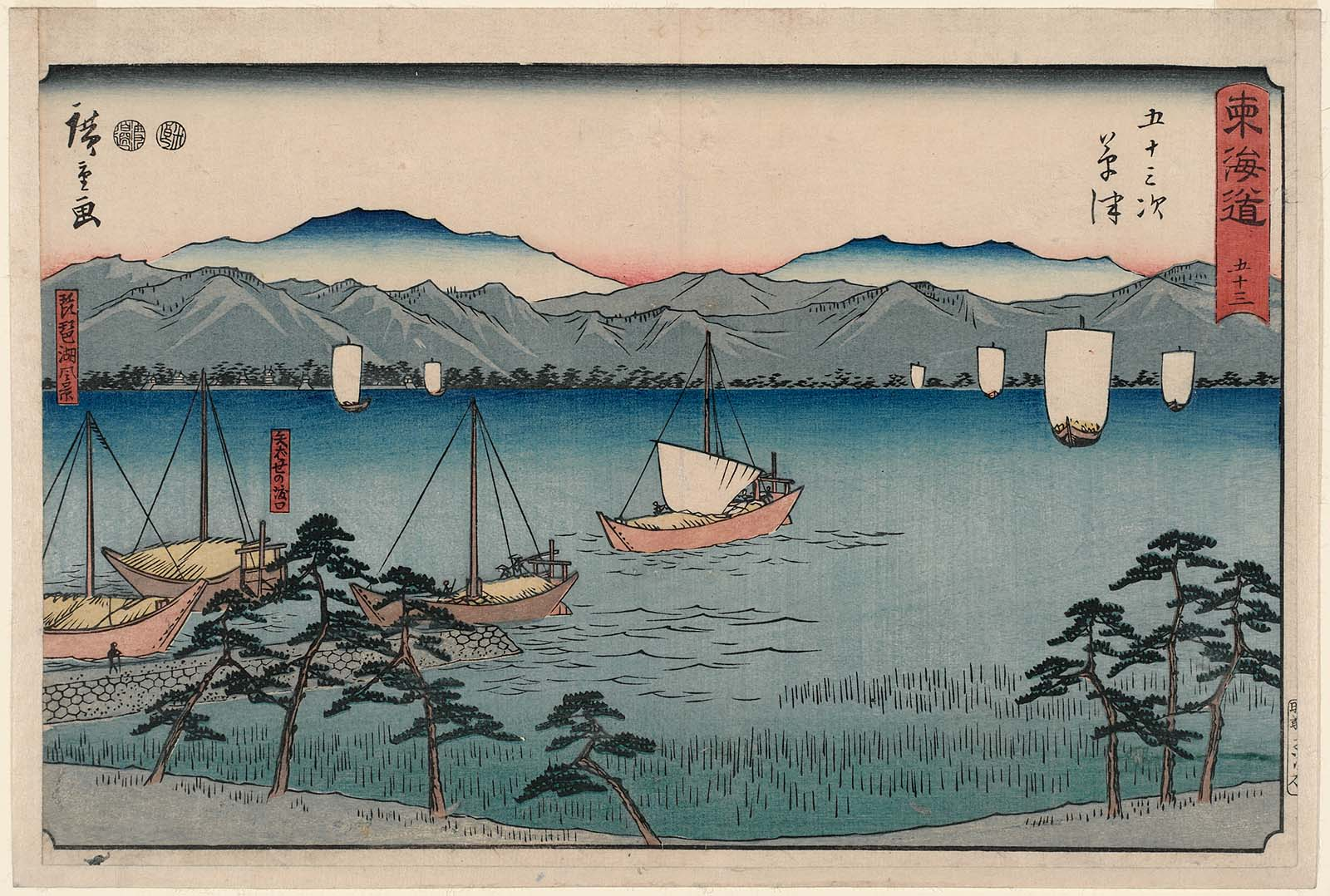
Hiroshige

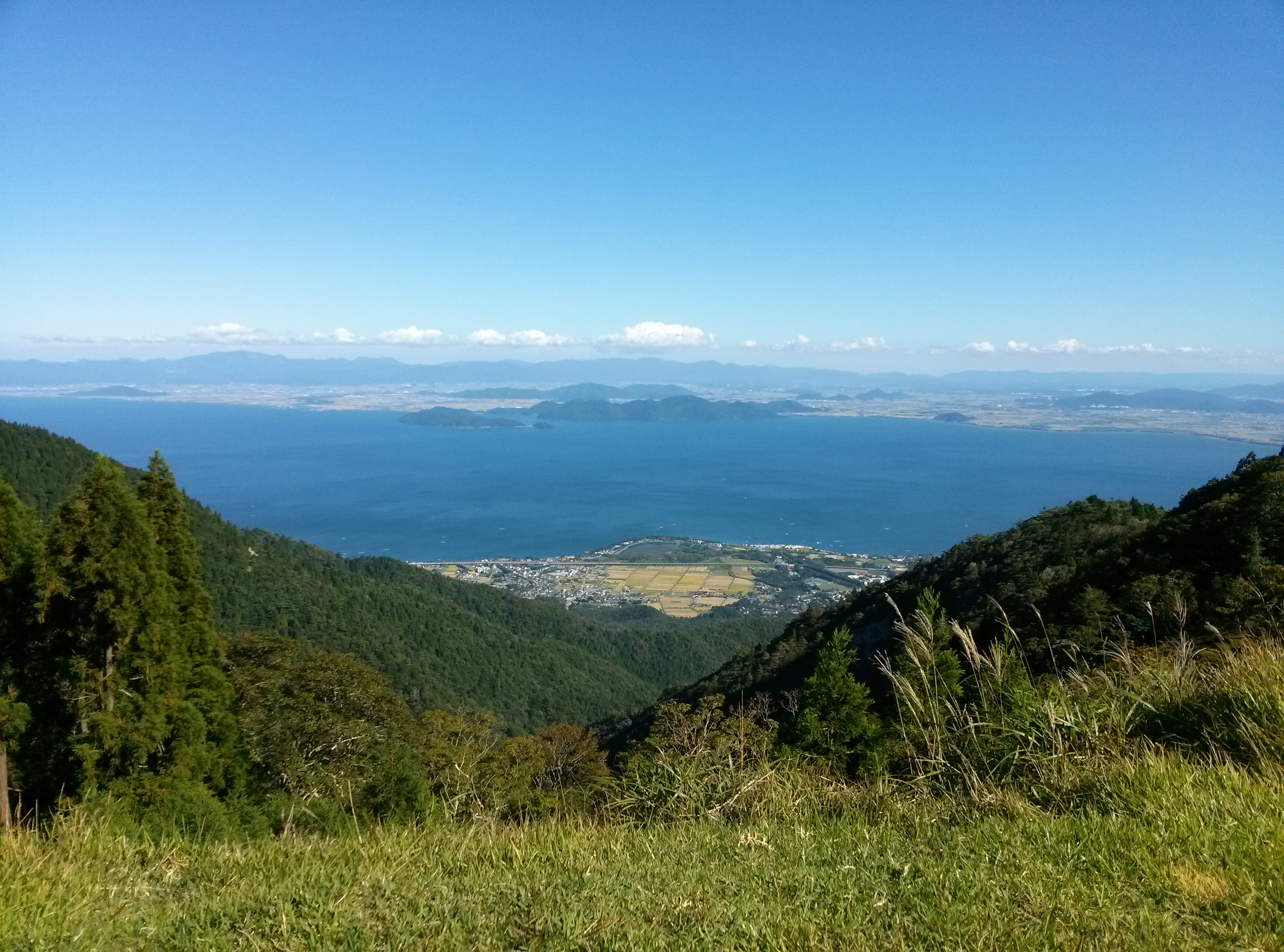
Lake Biwa from Kitahira-Tōge Pass

== See also ==
- Biwako Line
- Biwako Quasi-National Park
- Birdman Rally (1977–), the yearly televised homemade glider aircraft and human-powered transport competition.
- Biwa, Shiga, a town on the northern shore of Lake Biwa
- Eight Views of Ōmi
- Lake Hamana, a lake in Shizuoka Prefecture; its original name was "distant fresh-water sea".
- Reilac Shiga FC, a football club based in Kusatsu, Shiga facing the lake
- Takeshima (Shiga), an island on Biwa
- Tourism in Japan
