= Azai District, Ōmi =

Former district in Shiga Prefecture, Japan

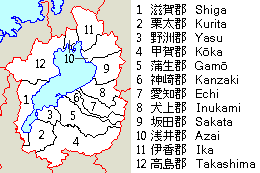

Azai (浅井郡, Azai-gun) was a district located in Ōmi Province/Shiga Prefecture.

The district is equivalent to the former towns of Nishiazai, Kohoku, Torahime, Biwa, Azai (excluding Sumainiwa), and northern Ibuki.

== Timeline ==
- 1878 Splits into Nishiazai and Higashiazai Districts.

== See also ==
- List of dissolved districts of Japan
