= Takatsuki (disambiguation) =

Takatsuki may refer to:

- Takatsuki, Osaka, a city in Osaka Prefecture, Japan
  - Takatsuki Station (Osaka), a railway station
- Takatsuki, Shiga, a former town in Shiga Prefecture, Japan
  - Takatsuki Station (Shiga), a railway station
- Takatsuki-class destroyer, a class of vessels of the Japan Maritime Self-Defense Force
  - JDS Takatsuki (DD-164), lead ship of the class
