= Lake Yogo =

Lake in Japan

- 余呉湖 (Japanese)
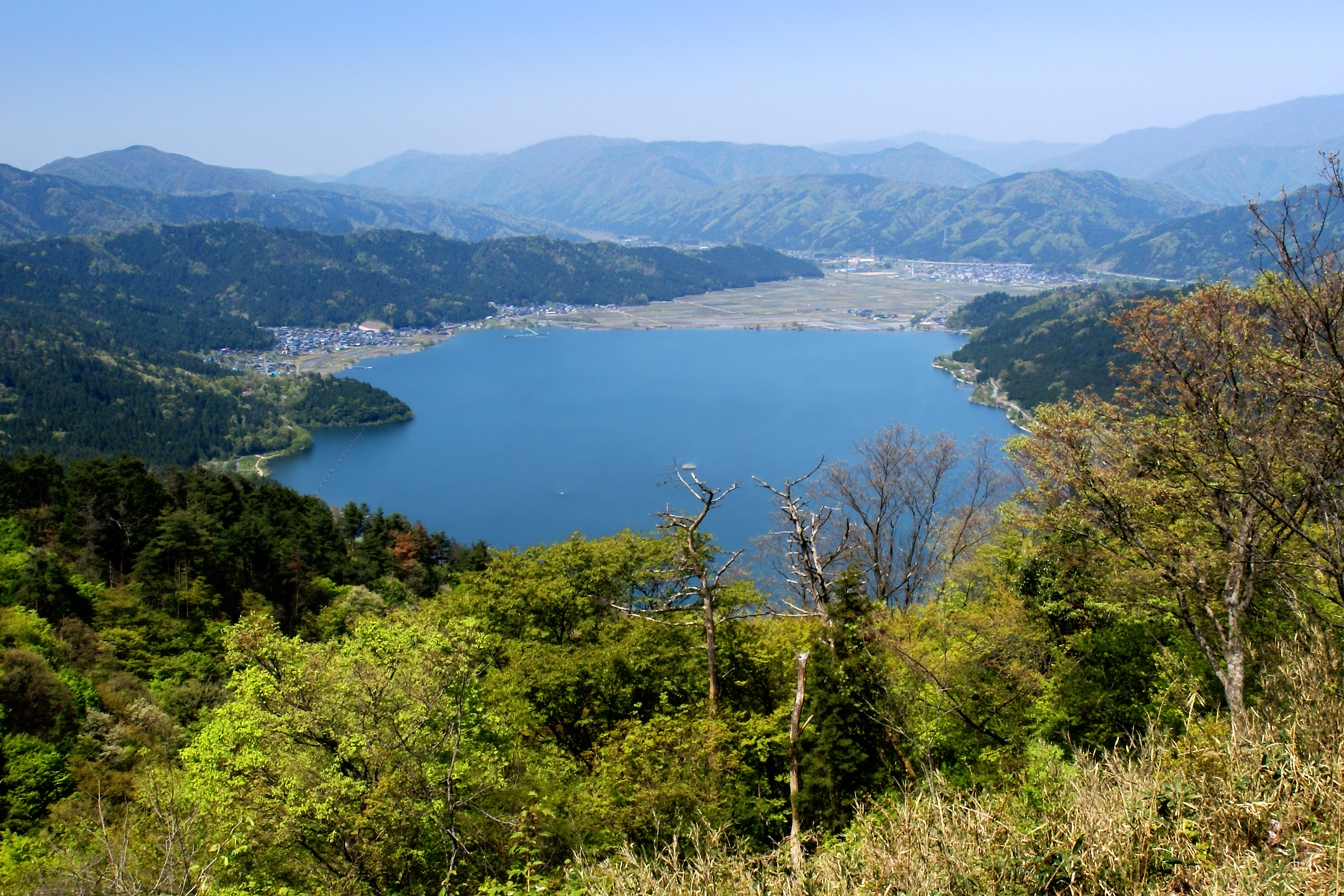
- Lake Yogo

- Location within Japan Location within Shiga Prefecture
- Location: Shiga Prefecture, Japan
- Coordinates: 35°31′20″N 136°11′38″E
- Type: freshwater
- Basin countries: Japan
- Max. length: 6.4 km (4.0 mi)
- Surface area: 1.97 km^{2} (0.76 sq mi)
- Average depth: 7.4 m (24 ft)
- Max. depth: 135 m (443 ft)
- Surface elevation: 133 m (436 ft)

Lake Yogo (Japanese: 余呉湖, Hepburn: Yogo-ko) is freshwater lake in Nagahama, Shiga Prefecture, Japan.

It is located north of Lake Biwa and is separated from the lake by Shizugatake.

Fish species inhabiting Lake Yogo include Silurus lithophilus (found only in Lake Yogo and Lake Biwa), pond smelt, crucian carp, common carp, eel, catfish, and teribuna.
