= Takatsuki Station =

Takatsuki Station can refer to two different train stations in Japan:

- Takatsuki Station (Osaka) (高槻駅), on the JR Kyoto Line in Takatsuki, Osaka, Japan
- Takatsuki Station (Shiga) (高月駅), on the Hokuriku Main Line in Nagahama, Shiga, Japan
