= Kinomoto Station =

Railway station in Nagahama, Shiga Prefecture, Japan

Kinomoto Station 木ノ本駅
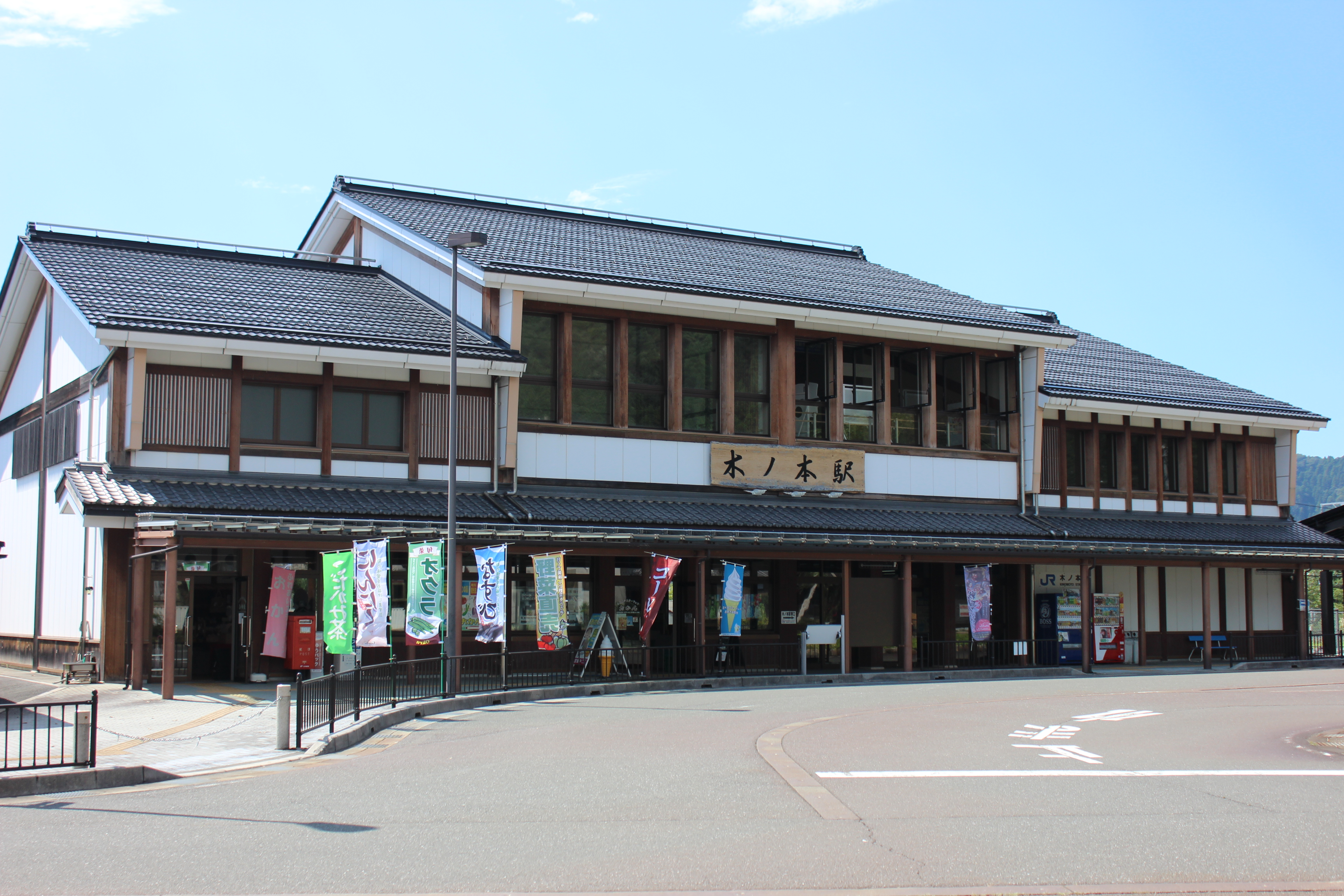
- Kinomoto Station, August 2020

General information
- Location: 1543 Kinomoto, Kinomoto-cho, Nagahama-shi, Shiga-ken 529-0425; Japan
- Coordinates: 35.5058°N 136.2217°E
- System: JR-West regional rail station
- Operator: JR West
- Line: Hokuriku Main Line
- Distance: 22.4 km from Maibara
- Platforms: 1 side + 1 island platform

Other information
- Station code: JR-A05
- Website: Official website

History
- Opened: 10 March 1882

Passengers
- FY 2023: 1,066 daily
Location
- Location within Shiga Prefecture Location within Japan

Kinomoto Station (木ノ本駅, Kinomoto-eki) is a passenger railway station located in the city of Nagahama, Shiga, Japan, operated by the West Japan Railway Company (JR West).

== Lines ==
Kinomoto Station is served by the Hokuriku Main Line, and is 22.4 kilometers from the terminus of the line at Maibara.

== Station layout ==
The station consists of one side platform and one island platform connected by an elevated station building. The station has a Midori no Madoguchi staffed ticket office.

== Platform ==
1, 2	■ Hokuriku Main Line	for Maibara and Kyoto
2, 3	■ Hokuriku Main Line	for Ōmi-Shiotsu, Tsuruga

== Adjacent stations ==
«	Service	»
Hokuriku Main Line
Yogo	Local	Takatsuki
Yogo	Rapid	Takatsuki
Yogo	Special Rapid	Takatsuki

== History ==
The station opened on 10 March 1882 on the Japanese Government Railway (JGR). From 1882 to 1964, Kinomoto Station was also the southern terminus of the now-discontinued 26.1 kilometer Yanagase Line to Tsuruga. The station came under the aegis of the West Japan Railway Company (JR West) on 1 April 1987 due to the privatization of Japan National Railway.

Station numbering was introduced in March 2018 with Kinomoto being assigned station number JR-A05.

== Passenger statistics ==
In fiscal 2019, the station was used by an average of 646 passengers daily (boarding passengers only).

== Surrounding area ==
- site of the Battle of Shizugatake
- Nagahama City Office Kinomoto Branch
- Shiga Prefectural Ika High School
- Nagahama City Kinomoto Junior High School
- Nagahama City Kinomoto Elementary School

== See also ==
- List of railway stations in Japan
