= Yogo Station =

Railway station in Nagahama, Shiga Prefecture, Japan

Yogo Station 余呉駅
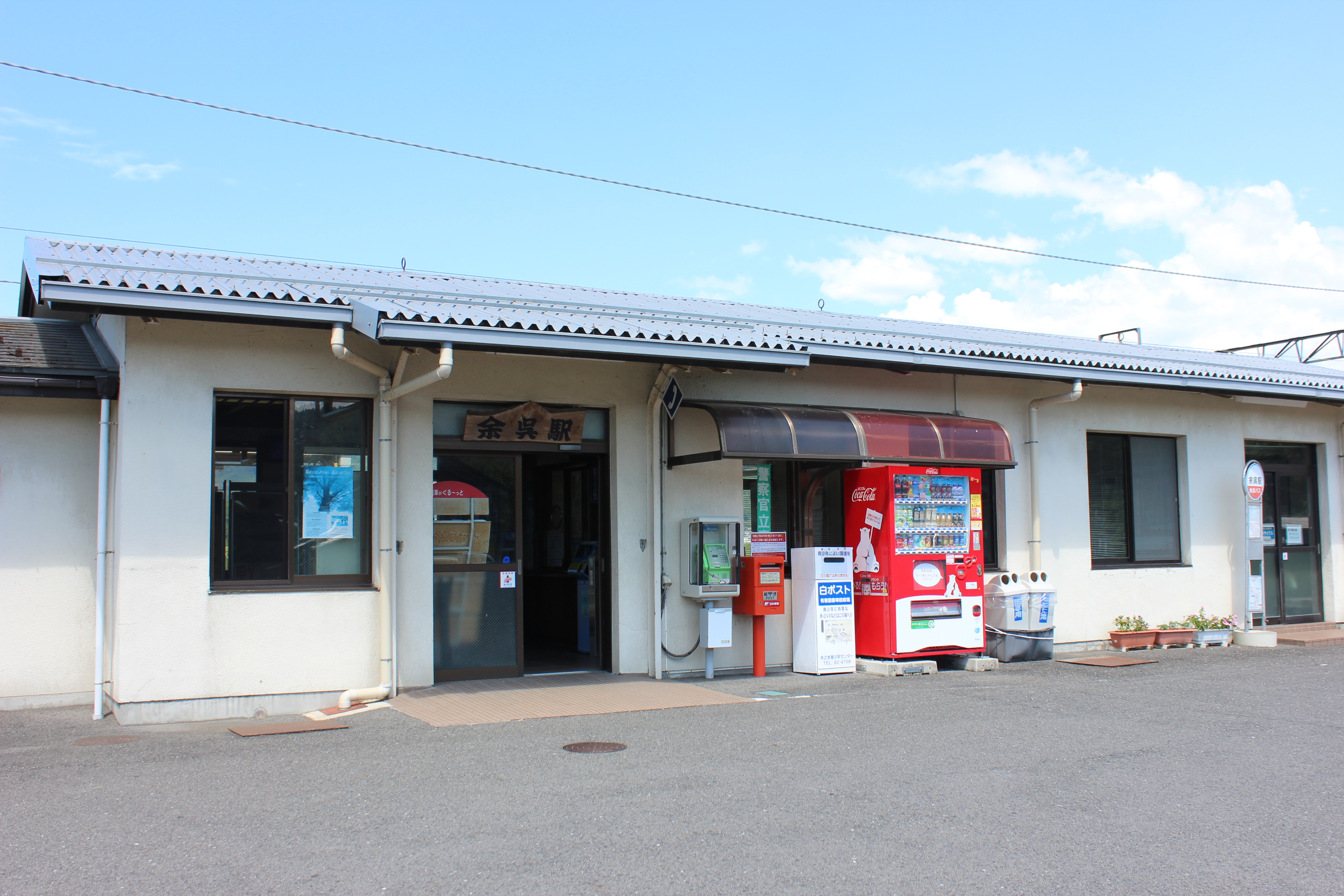
- Yogo Station, August 2020

General information
- Location: 1727 Yogocho Shimoyogo, Nagahama-shi, Shiga-ken 529-052; Japan
- Coordinates: 35.5336°N 136.1973°E
- System: JR-West regional rail station
- Operator: JR West
- Line: Hokuriku Main Line
- Distance: 26.5 km from Maibara
- Platforms: 1 island platform

Construction
- Structure type: Ground level

Other information
- Station code: JR-A04
- Website: Official website

History
- Opened: 1 October 1957

Passengers
- FY 2023: 248 daily
Location
- Location within Shiga Prefecture Location within Japan

Yogo Station (余呉駅, Yogo-eki) is a passenger railway station located in the city of Nagahama, Shiga, Japan, operated by the West Japan Railway Company (JR West).

== Lines ==
Yogo Station is served by the Hokuriku Main Line, and is 26.5 kilometers from the terminus of the line at Maibara.

== Station layout ==
The station consists of one island platform connected to the station building by a footbridge. The station is staffed.

== Platform ==
1	■ Hokuriku Main Line	for Ōmi-Shiotsu, Tsuruga
2	■ Hokuriku Main Line	for Maibara and Kyoto

== Adjacent stations ==
«	Service	»
Hokuriku Main Line
Omi-Shiotsu	Local	Kinomoto
Omi-Shiotsu	Rapid	Kinomoto
Omi-Shiotsu	Special Rapid	Kinomoto

== History ==
Yogo station opened on 1 October 1957 on the Japan National Railway (JNR). The station came under the aegis of the West Japan Railway Company (JR West) on 1 April 1987 due to the privatization of the JNR.

Station numbering was introduced in March 2018 with Yogo being assigned station number JR-A04.

== Passenger statistics ==
In fiscal 2019, the station was used by an average of 160 passengers daily (boarding passengers only).

== Surrounding area ==
- Mount Shizugatake
- Japan National Route 365

== See also ==
- List of railway stations in Japan
