= Ika District, Shiga =

Former district in Shiga prefecture, Japan

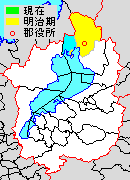
Map of Ika District with Meiji period (1890) area in yellow.

Ika (伊香郡, Ika-gun) was a district located in Shiga Prefecture, Japan.

As of 2003, the district had an estimated population of 27,986 and a density of 79.65 persons per km^{2}. The total area was 351.38 km^{2}.

== Former towns and villages ==
- Kinomoto
- Nishiazai
- Takatsuki
- Yogo

== Merger ==
- On January 1, 2010, the towns of Kinomoto, Nishiazai, Takatsuki and Yogo, along with the towns of Kohoku and Torahime (both from Higashiazai District) were merged into the expanded Nagahama. Higashiazai District and Ika District were both dissolved as a result of this merger.
