= Nagahama Castle =

- 長浜城
- Nagahama, Shiga, Japan
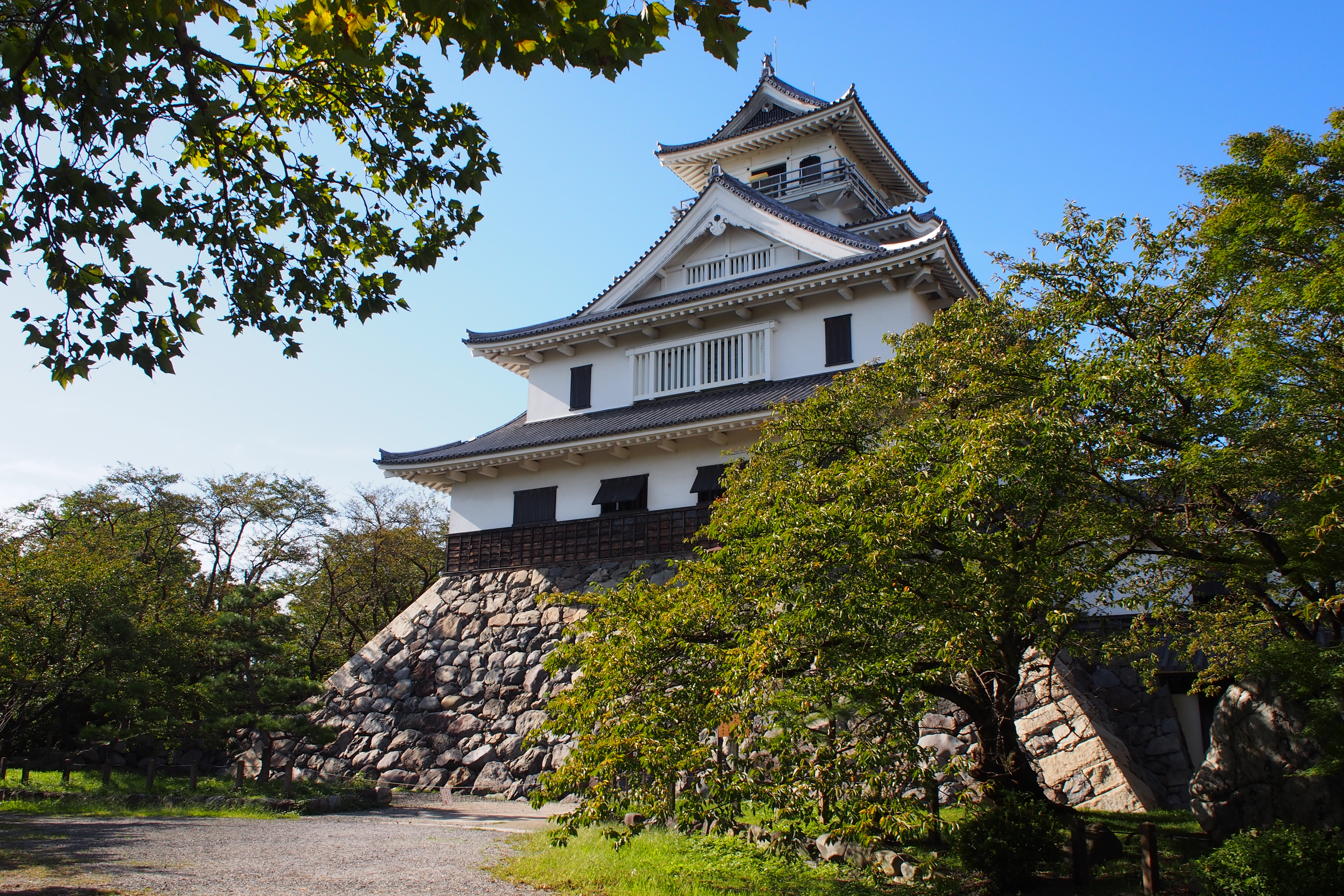
- Nagahama Castle

Site information
- Type: Flatland
- Condition: Reconstructed 1983

Location
- Location within Shiga Prefecture Location within Japan
- Coordinates: 35°22′39.65″N 136°15′40.87″E

Site history
- Built: 1573
- In use: 1573-1615

Garrison information
- Occupants: Hashiba clan

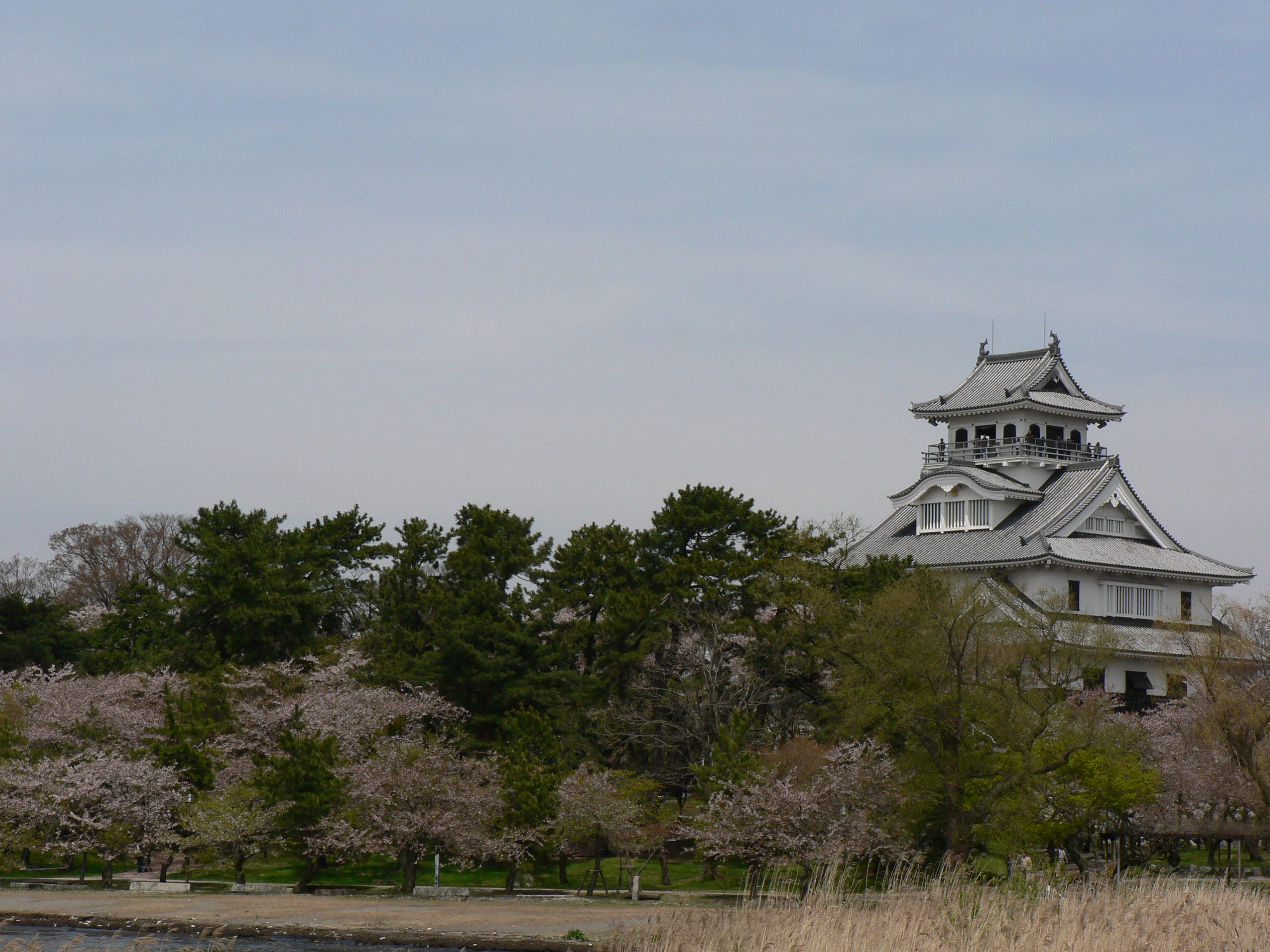
Nagahama Castle

Nagahama Castle (長浜城, Nagahama-jō) is a hirashiro (castle on a plain) located in Nagahama, Shiga Prefecture, Japan.

== History ==
Nagahama Castle was built in 1575-1576 by Hashiba Hideyoshi (later known as Toyotomi Hideyoshi) in the village then called Imahama, renaming the area Nagahama. Previously, he had ruled from Odani Castle, though found this hard to do as it was a yamashiro (mountaintop castle). Hideyoshi was succeeded as lord by Yamanouchi Kazutoyo after the 1583 Battle of Shizugatake. Kazutoyo was then replaced by Naito Nobunari after the Battle of Sekigahara in 1600. In 1615, the castle was demolished, though parts of it were used in the construction of Hikone Castle.

== Today ==
Nagahama Castle is now a park. Most of the castle lies in ruins, but the tenshu (keep) was reconstructed out of concrete in 1983. It contains a museum about the city of Nagahama.
