= Kinomoto, Shiga =

Dissolved municipality in Ika district, Japan

Coordinates: 35°30′08″N 136°13′21″E

Location of Kinomoto in Shiga Prefecture

Kinomoto (木之本町, Kinomoto-chō) was a town located in Ika District, Shiga Prefecture, Japan. It was the center of the district. In Sengoku period, Battle of Shizugatake broke out at a mountain in the west of Kinomoto.

As of 2003, the town had an estimated population of 8,795 and a density of 99.45 persons per km^{2}. The total area was 88.44 km^{2}.

On January 1, 2010, Kinomoto, along with the towns of Kohoku and Torahime (both from Higashiazai District), and the towns of Nishiazai, Takatsuki and Yogo (all from Ika District), was merged into the expanded city of Nagahama. Higashiazai District and Ika District were both dissolved as a result of this merger.
