= Mageshima =

Island within Satsunan Islands

Native name: Japanese: 馬毛島
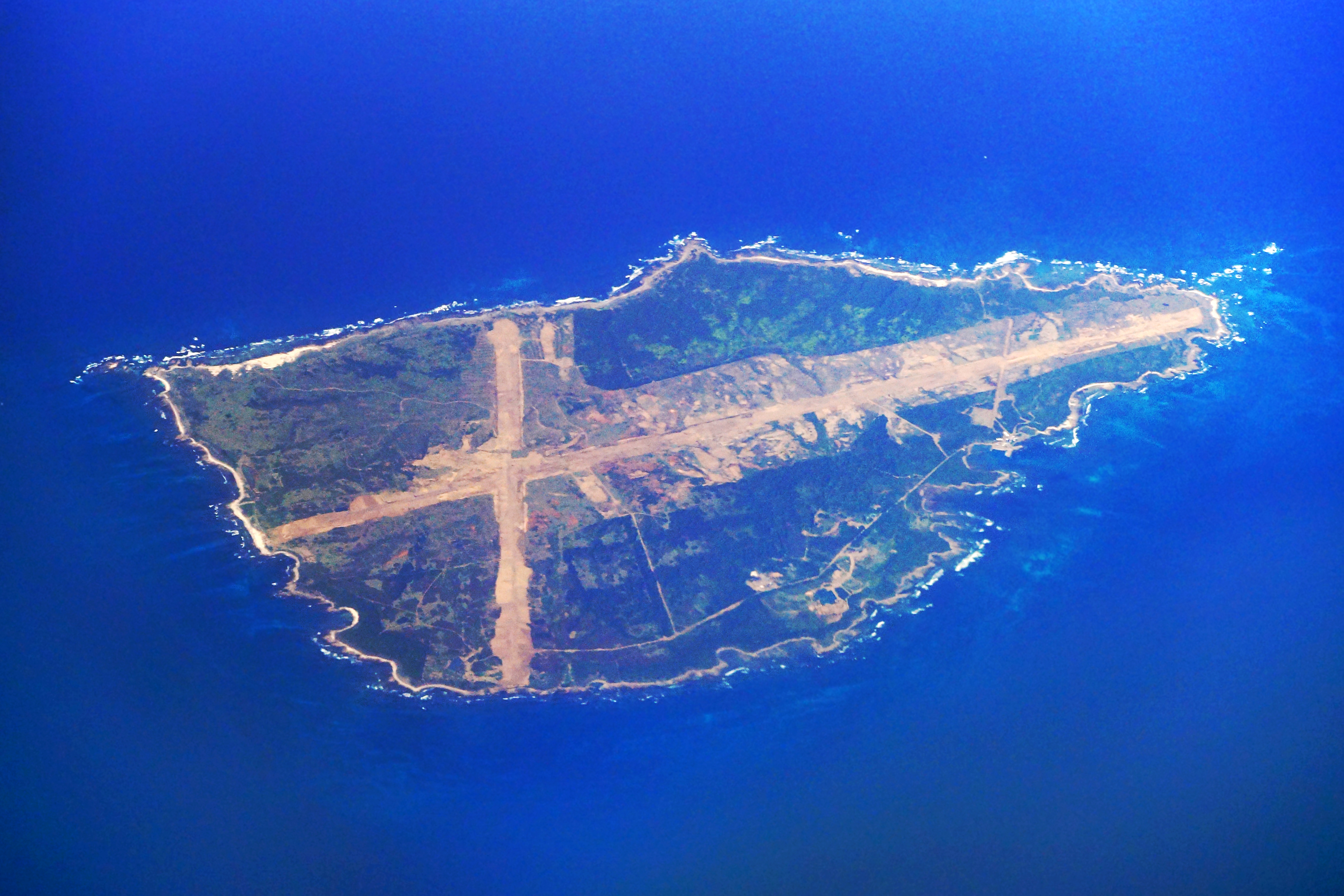
- Mageshima

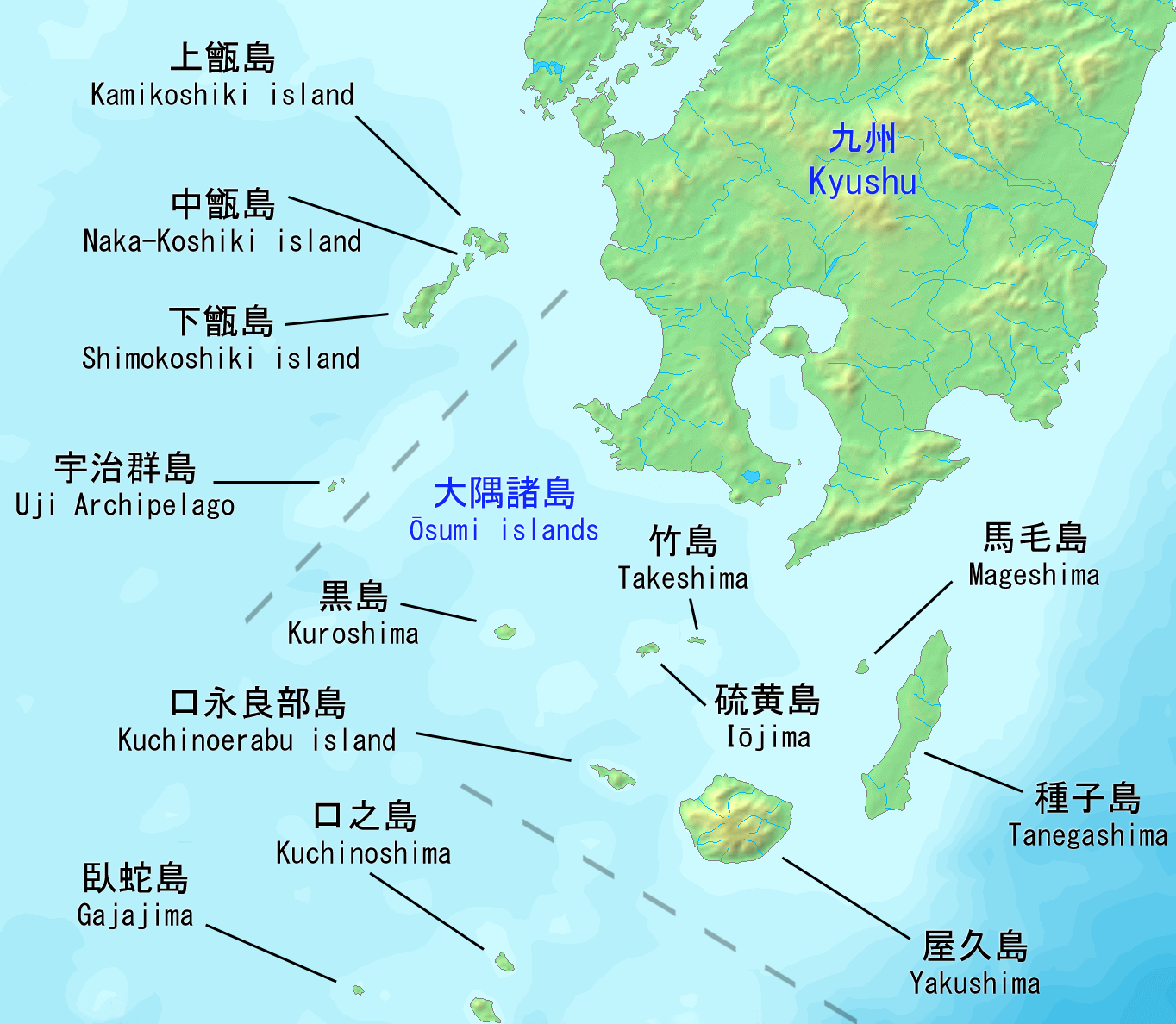
- Location of Mageshima in the Ōsumi Islands

Geography
- Location: East China Sea
- Coordinates: 30°44′29.9″N 130°51′16.9″E
- Archipelago: Ōsumi Islands
- Area: 8.2 km^{2} (3.2 sq mi)
- Coastline: 16.5 km (10.25 mi)
- Highest elevation: 71.7 m (235.2 ft)
- Highest point: Takenokoshi

Administration
- Japan
- Kagoshima Prefecture

Demographics
- Population: 15 (2005 census)
- Pop. density: 1.82/km^{2} (4.71/sq mi)
- Ethnic groups: Japanese

Mageshima (馬毛島), is an eight square kilometre Japanese island forming part of the Satsunan Islands, which are usually classed with the Ōsumi Islands. It belongs to Kagoshima Prefecture and it is administered by the city of Nishinoomote on Tanegashima.

== Geography ==
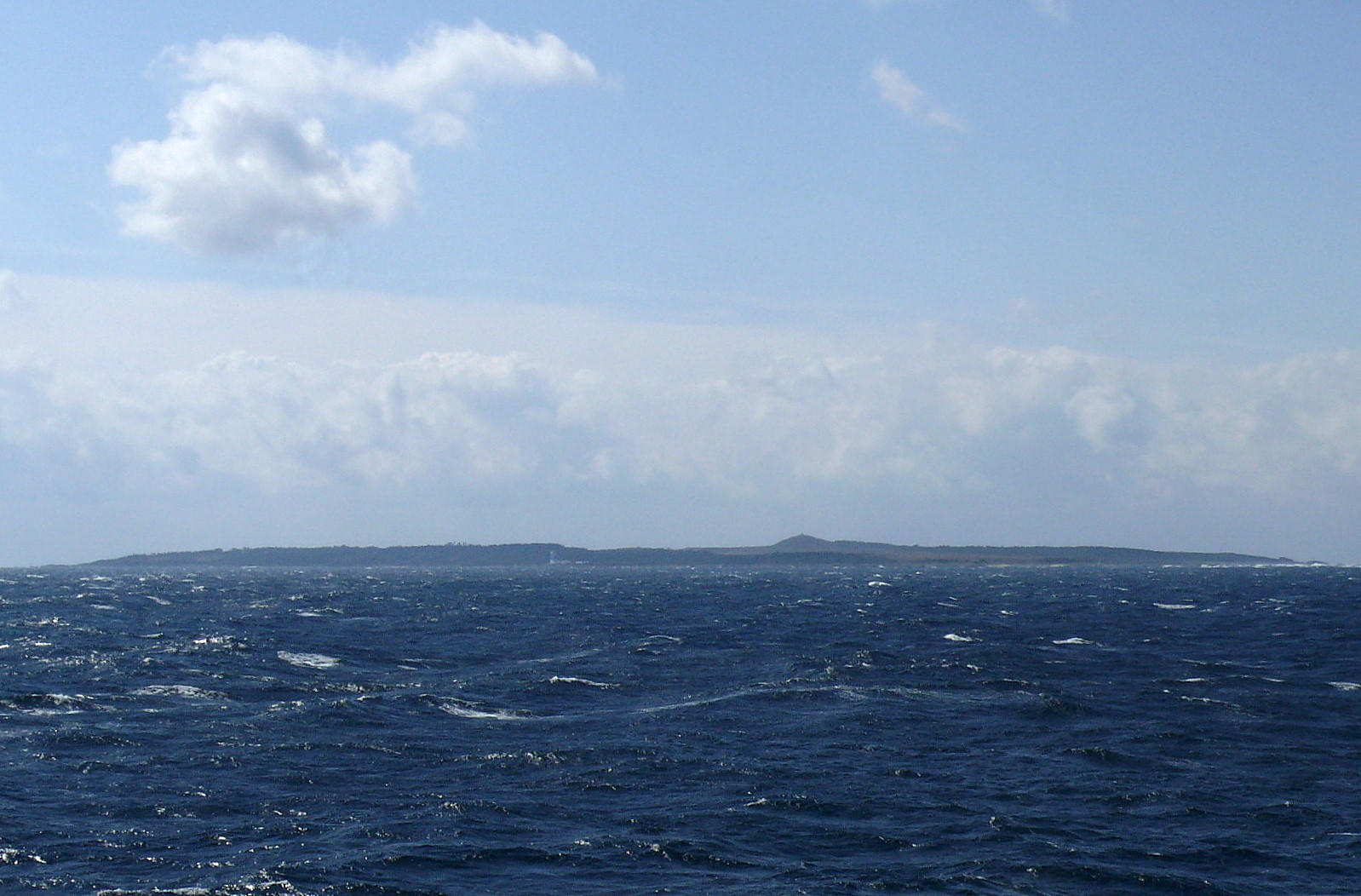
Mageshima seen from the east side (2010)

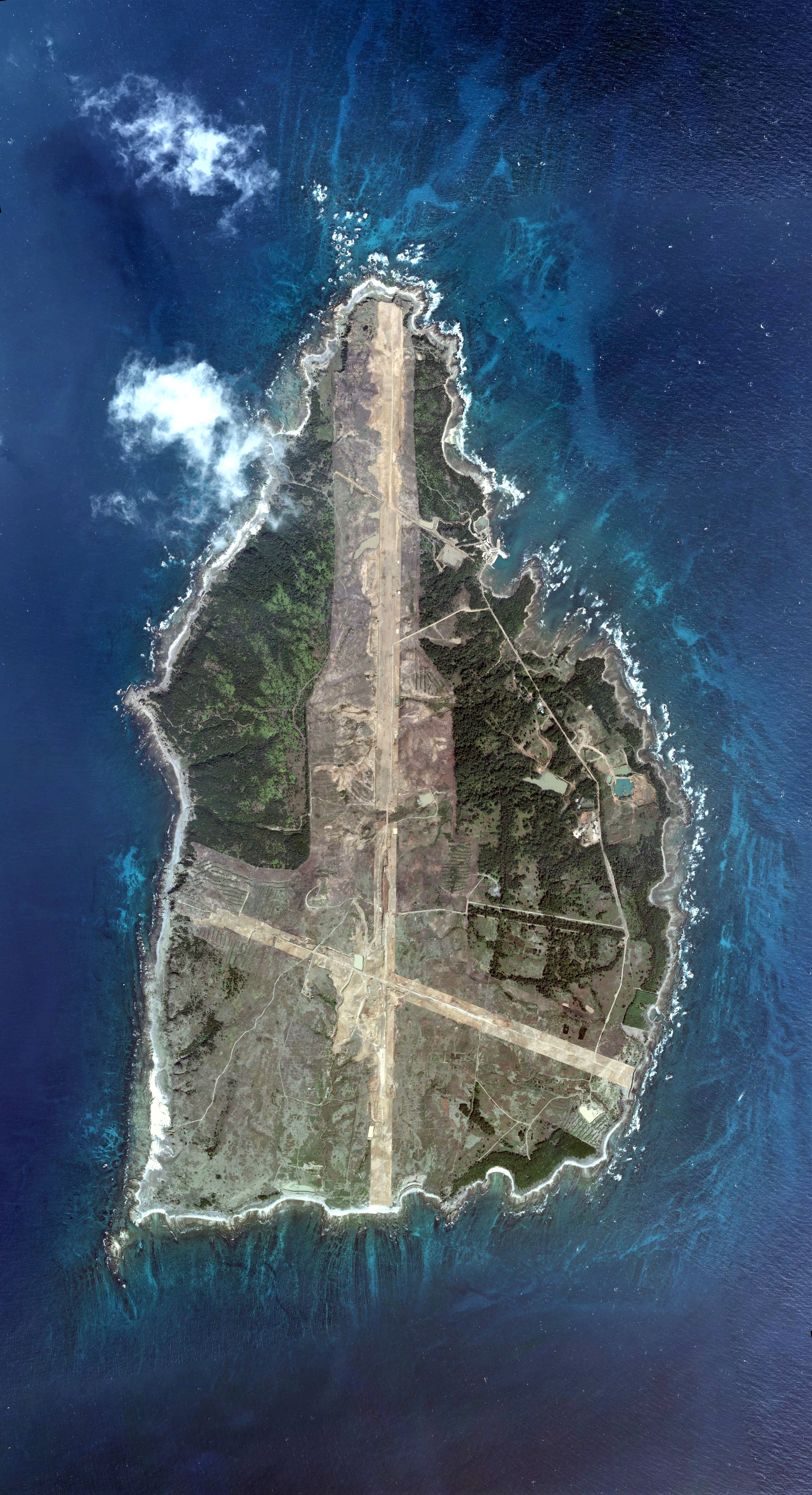
Aerial view of Mageshima, November 26, 2009

Mageshima is located 12 kilometres (6.5 nmi) west of Tanegashima. The island is of volcanic origin, and has an area of approximately 8.2 square kilometres (3.2 sq mi) with a circumference of 16.5 kilometres (10.3 mi). The highest elevations on the island is Takenokoshi (岳之越), with a height of 71.7 metres (235 ft) above sea level in the center of the island. The terrain is mostly low and flat. The island does not have rivers and its geology is not suitable for agriculture.

=== Main place names ===
Hayama (葉山), Ou Komori (王籠), Takabo (高坊), Kakise (垣瀬), Shiinoki (椎ノ木).

=== Rocks and reef ===
Geographical Survey Institute map (extract). Excludes land-connected beaches, small rocks on the reef, and unnamed rocks.

- Bose (房瀬) - Cape Ueno.
- Kose (小瀬), Katahirase (片平瀬), Ohirase (大平瀬), Kakise (垣瀬) - West side.
- Kitakojima (北小島), Onase (女瀬) - Cape Shimono.
- Takase (高瀬), Tsumasaki (ツマ崎) - Southeast side.
- Yokose (横瀬) - East side.

=== Wildlife ===
There are Sika deer on the island. The surrounding area has good fishing grounds.

=== Climate ===
The island’s climate is classified as subtropical, with a rainy season from May through September.

== History ==
=== Kamakura period to postwar ===
Mageshima has been occupied, at least seasonally, since the Kamakura period (1185–1333 CE), as fishermen from neighboring Tanegashima would use it as a base of operations. The inhabitants were evacuated during World War II for security reasons. In 1951, an effort was made to colonize the island with government assistance, and the island population reached a peak of 528 people in 113 households in 1958. The economy of the island was based on the production of sugar cane and vinegar, as well as commercial fishing. However, difficulties with agriculture due to pests, and due to foreign competition caused many islanders to abandon the island from the late 1960s.

=== Uninhabited ===
In 1974, the Heiwa Sogo Bank started a resort venture and floated plans for construction of the national oil reserve on the island, but neither plan came to fruition. In March 1980, the last resident left the island.

In 1995, a subsidiary of Tateishi Construction acquired the island, and announced plans to construct a landing field for the Japanese spaceplane, HOPE-X, on the island. Other plans to establish a spent nuclear fuel storage facility were also announced. However, subsequently no construction has been taken and the HOPE-X project itself was cancelled in 2003.

=== Land acquisition & military base ===
In 2009, Mageshima came under consideration as a possible relocation site for the Marine Corps Air Station Futenma in Ginowan, Okinawa, or at least as a site for the United States Navy to relocate its aircraft carrier aircraft touch-and-go training. However, Tateishi Construction subsequently came under investigation for tax fraud and for collusion with politicians over the project. Initial logging to clear an area for the proposed runways was performed without proper permission, and in September 2011 local fishermen filed lawsuits alleging damage to fishing grounds due to increased runoff created by the illegal logging.

In 2011, Japan agreed to provide the US Military with a new training site instead of Iwo Jima (Iōtō), which is much further south 1,360 km (850 mi) from Japan's main islands.

In November 2019, the Government of Japan made an agreement with the Tokyo-based development company Taston Airport to purchase Mageshima for 16 billion yen ($146 million). It will become a base of the Japan Self-Defense Forces and a training site to conduct landing practices for U.S. aircraft carrier-based aircraft. Japanese Chief Cabinet Secretary Yoshihide Suga said "purchase of Mageshima Island is extremely important and serves for strengthening deterrence by the Japan-US alliance as well as Japan's defense capability". In addition the base will supply the Nansei Islands.

On November 29, 2022, Kagoshima's governor Koichi Shiota agreed to the construction of the base citing the "increasingly severe security environment" surrounding Japan. Construction started on January 12, 2023 and is expected to take 4 years.

== See also ==
- Desert island
- List of islands
