= Shizugatake =

Mountain in Japan

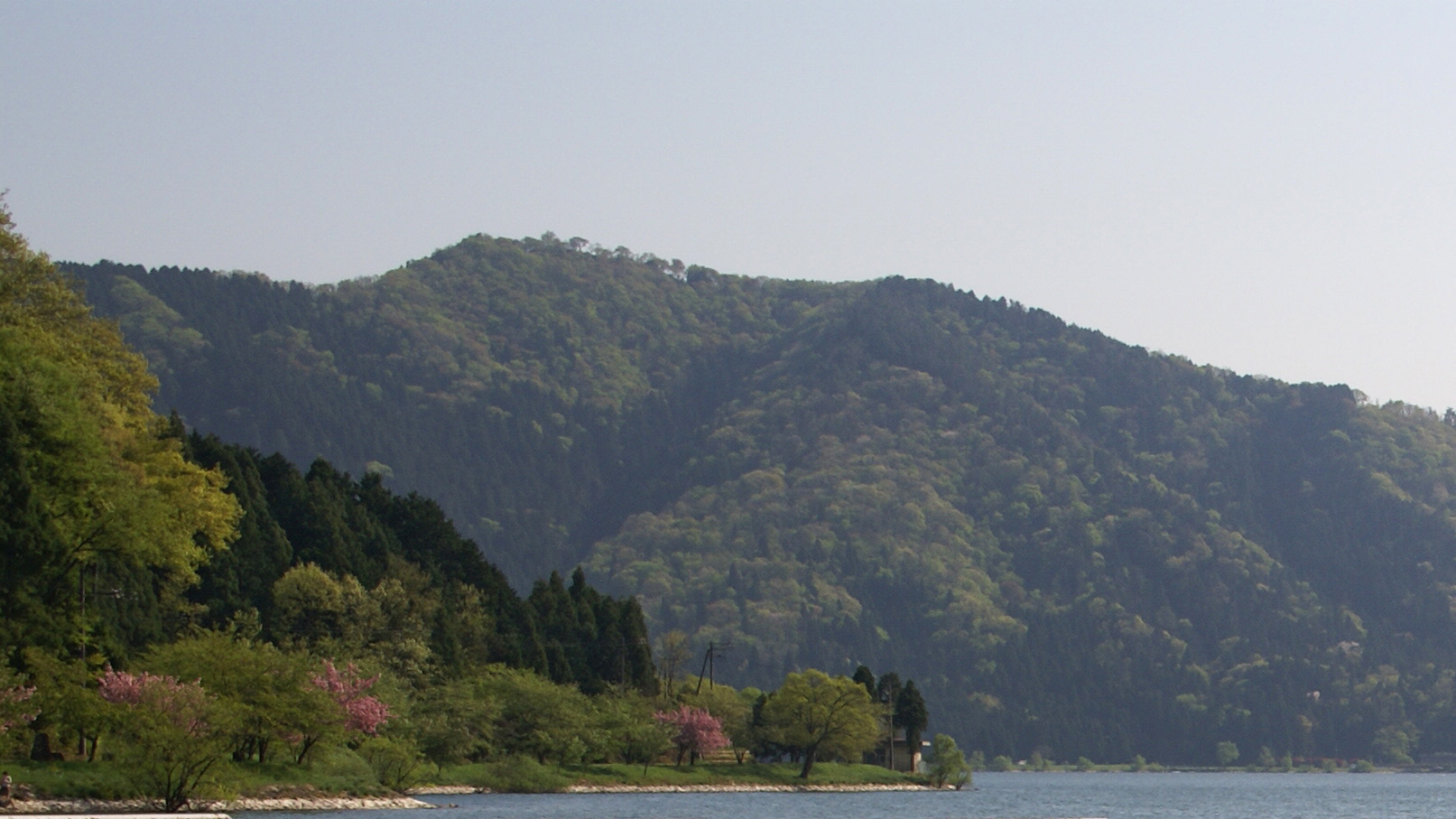

Highest point
- Elevation: 421.13 m (1,381.7 ft)
- Coordinates: 35°30′22″N 136°11′35″E

Naming
- Native name: 賤ヶ岳 (Japanese)

Geography
- Location within Japan Location within Shiga Prefecture
- Location: Nagahama, Shiga Prefecture, Japan

Shizugatake (Japanese: 賤ヶ岳) is a 421 m-tall (1,381 ft) mountain in Nagahama, Shiga Prefecture, Japan. This mountain separates Lake Biwa and Lake Yogo. The area surrounding the mountain is designated as Biwako Quasi-National Park. The Shigagadake Lift opened at the foot of the mountain in August 1959.

== History ==
In 1583, the Battle of Shizugatake took place near the mountain.
