= Nishinoomote =

Nishinoomote 西之表市
- City
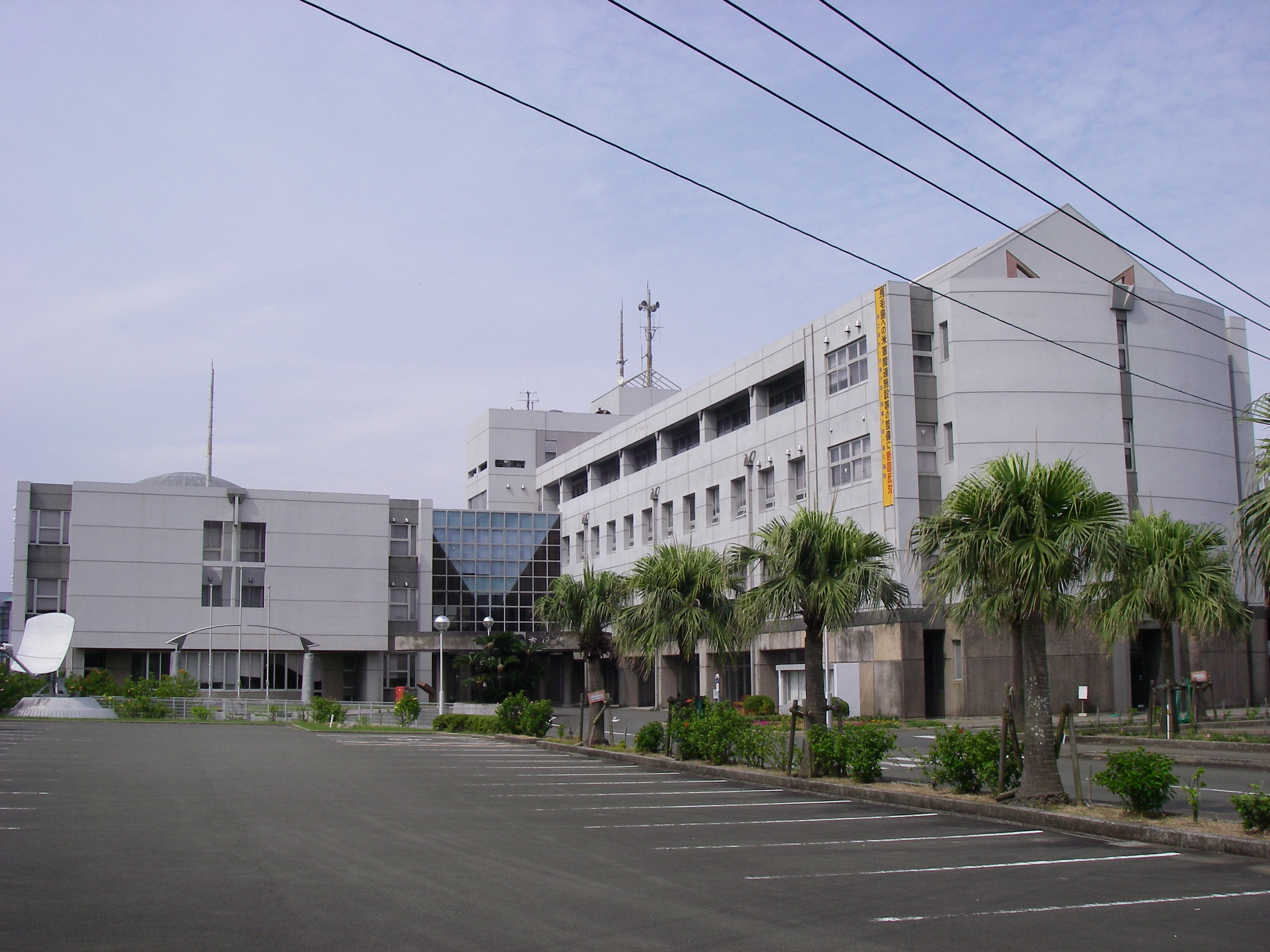
- Nishinoomote City Hall

- Flag Seal
- /0/queryThe property query is required; /0/idsThe property ids is required; /0Failed to match at least one schema; /0/titleThe property title is required; /0/serviceDoes not have a value in the enumeration ["page"]; /0Failed to match exactly one schema; /0/geometriesThe property geometries is required; /0/typeDoes not have a value in the enumeration ["GeometryCollection"]; /0/typeDoes not have a value in the enumeration ["MultiPolygon"]; /0/typeDoes not have a value in the enumeration ["Point"]; /0/typeDoes not have a value in the enumeration ["MultiPoint"]; /0/typeDoes not have a value in the enumeration ["LineString"]; /0/typeDoes not have a value in the enumeration ["MultiLineString"]; /0/typeDoes not have a value in the enumeration ["Polygon"]; /0/coordinatesThe property coordinates is required; /0/geometryThe property geometry is required; /0/typeDoes not have a value in the enumeration ["Feature"]; /0/featuresThe property features is required; /0/typeDoes not have a value in the enumeration ["FeatureCollection"]; Location of Nishinoomote in Kagoshima Prefecture

- Coordinates: 30°43′57″N 130°59′49″E
- Country: Japan
- Region: Kyushu (Ōsumi Islands)
- Prefecture: Kagoshima

Government
  - Mayor: Shusuke Yasaka (since April 2017)

Area
  - Total: 205.57 km^{2} (79.37 sq mi)

Population (April 30, 2024)
  - Total: 14,151
  - Density: 68.838/km^{2} (178.29/sq mi)
- Time zone: UTC+9 (Japan Standard Time)
- Phone number: 0997-22-1111
- Address: 7612 Nishinoomote, Nishinoomote-shi, Kagoshima-ken 891-3193
- Website: Official website
- Symbols
- Flower: Lilium longiflorum
- Insect: Great Orange Tip
- Tree: Akō (Ficus superba Miq. var. japonica Miq.)

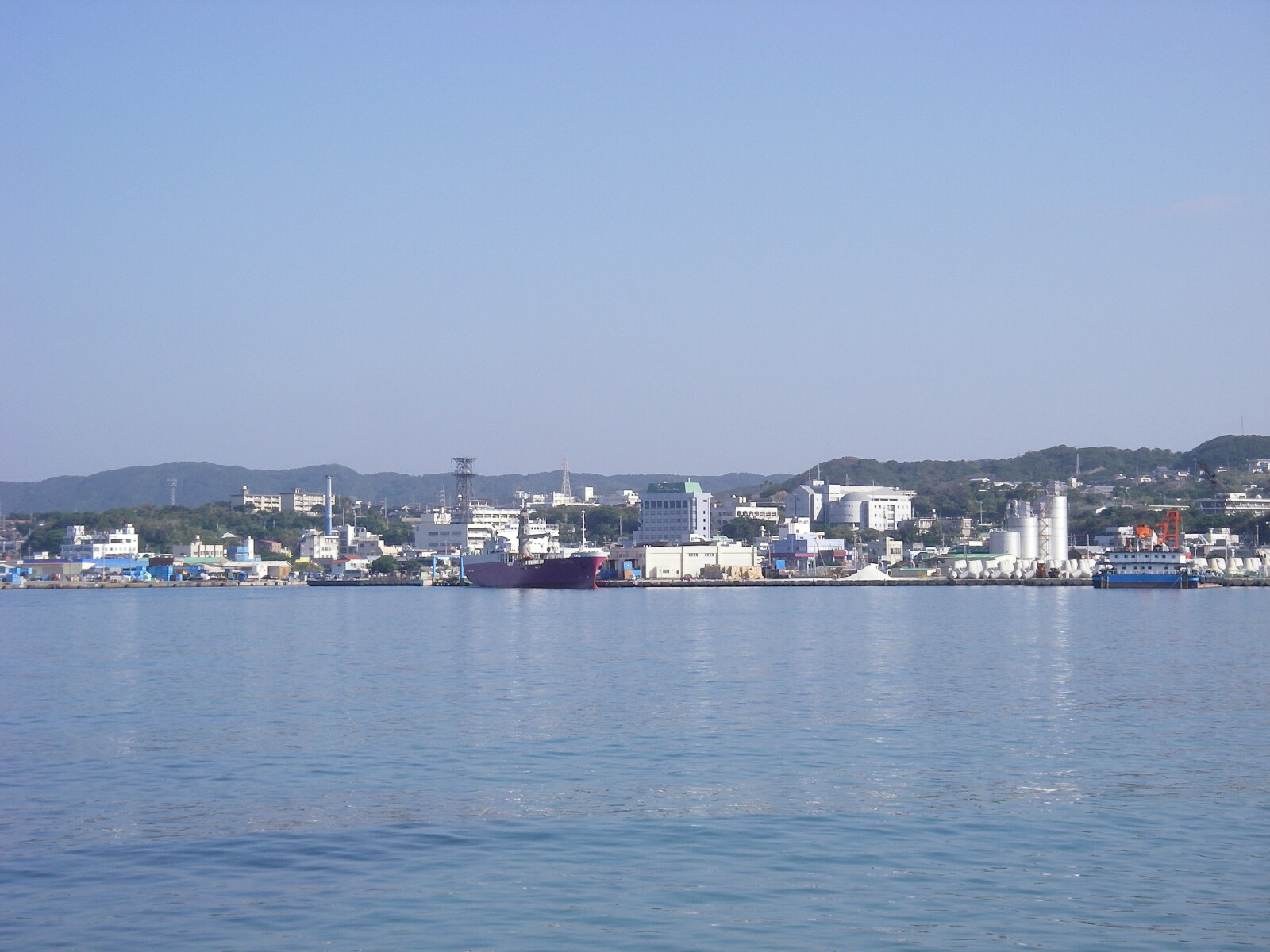
Nishinoomote

Nishinoomote (西之表市, Nishinoomote-shi) is a city located on the island of Tanegashima, in Kagoshima Prefecture, Japan. As of 30 April 2024, the city had an estimated population of 14,151 in 7941 households, and a population density of 69 persons per km^{2}. The total area of the city is 205.57 km^{2} (79.37 sq mi).

== Geography ==
Nishinoomote, located on the northern portion of Tanegashima, is bordered by the East China Sea to the west and the Pacific Ocean to the east, and by the Ōsumi Strait separating Tanegashima from the Kyushu mainland. The city also includes the offshore island of Mageshima within its borders.

=== Surrounding municipalities ===
- Nakatane

=== Climate ===
Nishinoomote has a humid subtropical climate (Köppen Cfa) characterized by warm summers and cool winters with no snowfall. The average annual temperature in Nishinoomote is 20.0 °C. The average annual rainfall is 2174 mm with September as the wettest month. The temperatures are highest on average in August, at around 27.7 °C, and lowest in January, at around 12.0 °C. The area is subject to frequent typhoons.

=== Demographics ===
Per Japanese census data, the population of Nishinoomote is as shown below:

Historical population
Year	Pop.	±%
1920	18,154	—
1930	20,533	+13.1%
1940	21,804	+6.2%
1950	30,123	+38.2%
1960	32,645	+8.4%
1970	26,222	−19.7%
1980	23,537	−10.2%
1990	20,952	−11.0%
2000	18,866	−10.0%
2010	16,951	−10.2%
2020	14,708	−13.2%

== History ==
The area of Nishinoomote was part of ancient Tane Province, which was abolished in 824 and incorporated into Ōsumi Province. Tanegashima became a part of Shimazu shōen in 1140. During the Edo Period, the area was part of the holdings of Satsuma Domain. Sugarcane was first cultivated in 1824. Kitatane Village was established on April 1, 1889 with the establishment of the modern municipalities system. It was elevated to town status on April 1, 1926 and renamed Nishinoomote. Towards the end of World War II, the town was garrisoned by a 12,000-man force from the Imperial Japanese Army and was thus subjected to bombing by the United States Navy in 1945. It was elevated to city status on October 1, 1958.

== Government ==
Nishinoomote has a mayor-council form of government with a directly elected mayor and a unicameral city council of 14 members. Nishinoomote, collectively with the other municipalities of Kumage District, contributes two members to the Kagoshima Prefectural Assembly. In terms of national politics, the city is part of the Kagoshima 4th district of the lower house of the Diet of Japan.

== Economy ==
The economy of Nishinoomote is based largely on agriculture (sugar cane, sweet potatoes), livestock (cattle, pigs, etc.), and fisheries.

== Education ==
Nishinoomote has ten public elementary high schools and one public junior high school operated by the town government, and one public high school operated by the Kagoshima Prefectural Board of Education.

== Transportation ==
=== Seaport ===
Nishinoomote Port is a regional transportation hub, with frequent ferry service to Kagoshima, Tokyo, Kobe, and Osaka, as well as Okinawa and the other Osumi islands.

=== Highway ===
- National Route 58

== Sister cities ==
- (Japan) Isa, Kagoshima, since November 10, 1962
- (Japan) Sakai, Osaka, since October 18, 1986
- (Japan) Nagahama, Shiga, since October 8, 1987
- Vila do Bispo, Portugal, since October 1, 1993 (in recognition of the fact that it was Fernão Mendes Pinto, a Portuguese explorer, who claimed to be the first European to set foot on Japan, and did so on Tanegashima in 1543.)
