= Yogo, Shiga =

Dissolved municipality in Shiga prefecture, Japan

Coordinates: 35°30′N 136°12′E

Location of Yogo in Shiga Prefecture

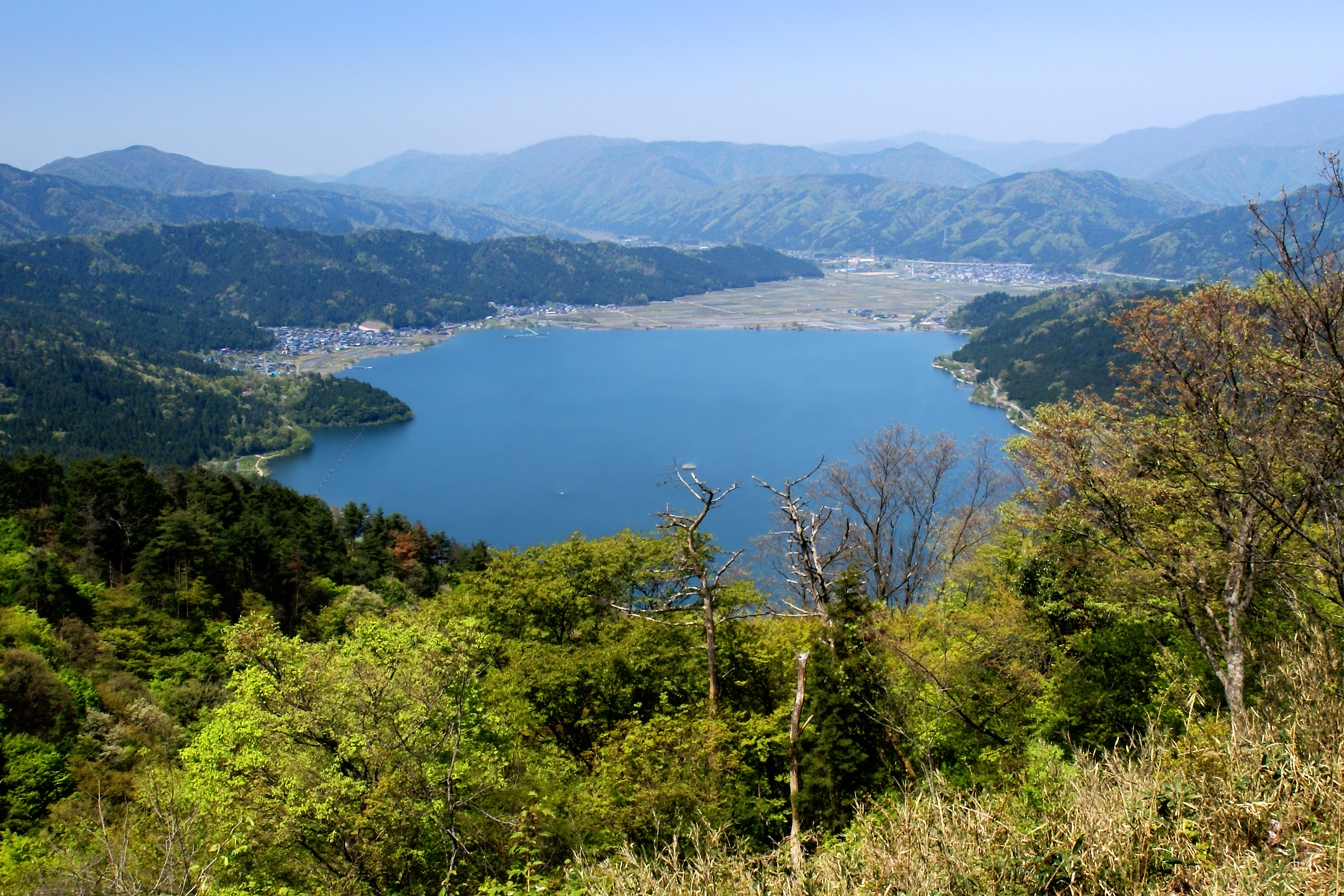
Lake Yogo

Yogo (余呉町, Yogo-chō) was a town located in Ika District, Shiga Prefecture, Japan.

.

== Geography ==
Yogo is located in northernmost Shiga and considerably cold in winter with high snowfall. There is a small lake which is famous for a Swan Maiden legend.

== Population ==
As of 2003, the town had an estimated population of 4,045 and a density of 24.13 persons per km^{2}. The total area was 167.62 km^{2}.

== History ==
=== Dissolution ===
On January 1, 2010, Yogo, along with the towns of Kohoku and Torahime (both from Higashiazai District), and the towns of Kinomoto, Nishiazai and Takatsuki (all from Ika District), was merged into the expanded city of Nagahama. Higashiazai District and Ika District were both dissolved as a result of this merger.
