= Shiga 2nd district =

Legislative district of Japan

- Parliamentary constituency for the House of Representatives
- Numbered map of Shiga Prefecture single-member districts
- Electorate: 437,139 (as of September 1, 2022)

Current constituency
- Created: 1994
- Number of members: 1
- Party: LDP
- Representative: Ken'ichirō Ueno

Shiga 2nd district (Shiga[-ken dai-]ni-ku) is a single-member electoral district for the House of Representatives, the lower house of the Japanese National Diet, located in Eastern Shiga Prefecture.

Shiga 2nd district was initially won by Masayoshi Takemura of New Party Harbinger (NPH), the former three-term governor of Shiga who had represented the five-member Shiga at-large district before the electoral reform since 1986 and was Chief Cabinet Secretary in the anti-LDP coalition Hosokawa Cabinet and Minister of Finance in the LDP-JSP-NPH Murayama Cabinet. In the 2000 Representatives election, he ran as an independent with Democratic Party support and lost to Liberal Democrat Akira Konishi. Konishi died in 2001, the resulting by-election was won by his younger brother Osamu. However, in the general House of Representatives election of 2003, Democrat Issei Tajima narrowly beat Konishi who won a seat in the proportional vote. In the "postal election" of 2005, Tajima defended the seat as Konishi ran as independent postal privatization rebel and the LDP sent "assassin" candidate Yūji Fujii. Fujii won a proportional seat in 2005, but lost it in 2009 as Tajima won the district race by a large margin; in 2010, Fujii was elected mayor of Nagahama City. In the 2012 House of Representatives election, Ken'ichirō Ueno who had represented the 1st district for the Liberal Democrats between 2005 and 2009 moved to the 2nd district and beat Tajima.

== Area ==
- Hikone
- Nagahama
- Ōmihachiman
- Higashiōmi
- Maibara
- Gamō District
- Echi District
- Inukami District

In the 2002 reapportionment Shiga gained a seat and the southern portion of the 2nd district was transferred to the newly created Shiga 4th district. In the 2022 reapportionment, the 4th district was abolished, thus the current 2nd district has similar borders to when it was created in 1994. The smaller 2nd district had 264,168 eligible voters in 2012.

== List of representatives ==
Representative	Party	Dates	Notes
Masayoshi Takemura	NPH	1996–2000	Left NPH in 1998
Akira Konishi	LDP	2000–2001	Died in office
Osamu Konishi	LDP	2001–2003	
Issei Tajima	DPJ	2003–2012	
Ken'ichirō Ueno	LDP	2012–	Incumbent

== Election results ==
2026
Party	Candidate	Votes	%	±%
LDP	Kenichiro Ueno (incumbent)	141,853	60.1	▲16.4
Centrist Reform	Michio Hirao	47,132	20.0	▼8.8
Ishin	Kyōsuke Okaya	46,898	19.9	▼7.6
Registered electors		427,537		
Turnout			56.48	▲2.44
LDP hold				

2024
Party	Candidate	Votes	%	±%
Liberal Democratic (endorsed by Komeito)	Kenichiro Ueno (incumbent)	99,347	43.70	▼12.87
CDP	Michio Hirao	65,324	28.74	▼14.69
Innovation	Hisashi Tokunaga	62,646	27.56	New
Majority		34,023	14.96	▲1.82
Registered electors		430,949		
Turnout		227,317	54.04	▼2.89
LDP hold				

2021
Party	Candidate	Votes	%	±%
LDP	Kenichiro Ueno	83,502	56.6	▲6.1
CDP	Issei Tajima	64,119	43.4	▲3.2
Turnout			56.93	▲1,13
LDP hold				

2017
Party	Candidate	Votes	%	±%
LDP	Ken'ichirō Ueno	73,694	50.5	▲1.7
Kibō no Tō	Issei Tajima	58,718	40.2	
Independent	Jishō Taigetsu	11,073	7.6	
HRP	Masashi Arakawa	2,576	1.8	
Turnout			55.80	▲4.09
LDP hold				

2014
Party	Candidate	Votes	%	±%
LDP	Ken'ichirō Ueno	65,102	48.8	▲5.5
Democratic	Issei Tajima (elected by PR)	54,095	40.6	▲9.1
JCP	Mutsuko Nakagawa	14,163	10.6	▲2.8
Turnout			51.71	▼8.35
LDP hold				

2012
Party	Candidate	Votes	%	±%
LDP (NK)	Ken'ichirō Ueno	67,182	43.3	
DPJ (PNP)	Issei Tajima	48,924	31.5	
YP (JRP)	Yoshiyuki Yoichi	26,978	17.4	
JCP	Mutsuko Nakagawa	12,084	7.8	

2009
Party	Candidate	Votes	%	±%
DPJ (PNP)	Issei Tajima	109,885	61.0	
LDP (NK)	Yūji Fujii	66,959	37.2	
HRP	Nobutaka Ikeda	3,205	1.8	
Turnout		183,270	69.71	

2005
Party	Candidate	Votes	%	±%
DPJ	Issei Tajima	67,481	38.5	
LDP	Yūji Fujii (won Kinki PR seat)	54,067	30.8	
Independent	Osamu Konishi	43,416	24.8	
JCP	Kazuyo Maruoka	10,413	5.9	
Turnout		177,450	68.36	

2003
Party	Candidate	Votes	%	±%
DPJ	Issei Tajima	69,620	44.9	
LDP	Osamu Konishi (won Kinki PR seat)	65,033	41.9	
Independent	Ryūji Kawashima	11,814	7.6	
JCP	Shin'ichi Sakai	8,741	5.6	
Turnout		157,333	61.11	

October 28, 2001 by-election
Party	Candidate	Votes	%	±%
LDP	Osamu Konishi	99,572	52.0	
DPJ	Issei Tajima	76,154	39.8	
JCP	Etsuko Narumiya	15,765	8.2	

2000
Party	Candidate	Votes	%	±%
LDP	Akira Konishi	125,625	45.7	
Independent (DPJ)	Masayoshi Takemura	115,322	42.0	
JCP	Akihiko Hiyama	33,660	12.3	

1996
Party	Candidate	Votes	%	±%
NPH	Masayoshi Takemura	107,053	43.0	
LDP	Akira Konishi	79,136	31.8	
NFP	Tsutomu Matsumura	35,192	14.1	
JCP	Kan Kikuchi	27,595	11.1	
Turnout		254,262	62.65	
