= Issei Tajima =

Japanese politician

- 田島 一成
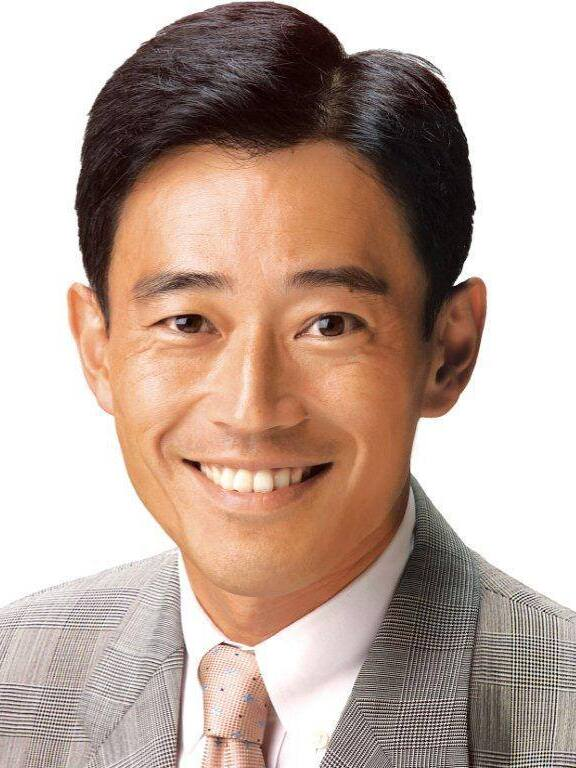
- Official portrait, 2009

Mayor of Hikone
- Incumbent
- Assumed office 10 May 2025
- Preceded by: Hiroyuki Wada

Member of the House of Representatives
- In office 19 December 2014 – 28 September 2017
- Constituency: Kinki PR
- In office 10 November 2003 – 16 November 2012
- Preceded by: Osamu Konishi
- Succeeded by: Kenichiro Ueno
- Constituency: Shiga 2nd

Member of the Shiga Prefectural Assembly
- In office 1999–2001
- Constituency: Hikone City

Member of the Hikone City Council
- In office 1991–1999

Personal details
- Born: 15 June 1962 (age 64) Hikone, Shiga, Japan
- Party: Independent
- Other political affiliations: DPJ (2001–2016); DP (2016–2017); KnT (2017–2018); CDP (2018–2022)
- Education: Chuo University; Carleton College; Doshisha University

Issei Tajima (田島 一成, Tajima Issei; born 15 June 1962) is a former Japanese politician who served in the House of Representatives in the Diet (national legislature) as a member of the Democratic Party of Japan. A native of Hikone, Shiga he earned his undergraduate degree in Chuo University, study-abroad credit in Carleton College in Minnesota, United States and master's degree in Doshisha University. He was elected for the first time in 2005.

House of Representatives (Japan)
Preceded by Osamu Konishi	Member of the House of Representatives from Shiga 2nd district 2003–2012	Succeeded by Ken'ichirō Ueno
Political offices
Preceded by Masayoshi Yoshino	Senior Vice Minister of the Environment; 2009–2010	Succeeded by Shōichi Kondō
