= Kenichiro Ueno =

Japanese politician (born 1965)

- 上野 賢一郎
- Official portrait, 2026

Minister of Health, Labour, and Welfare
- Incumbent
- Assumed office 21 October 2025
- Prime Minister: Sanae Takaichi
- Preceded by: Takamaro Fukuoka

Member of the House of Representatives
- Incumbent
- Assumed office 19 December 2012
- Preceded by: Issei Tajima
- Constituency: Shiga 2nd
- In office 12 September 2005 – 21 July 2009
- Preceded by: Tatsuo Kawabata
- Succeeded by: Tatsuo Kawabata
- Constituency: Shiga 1st

Personal details
- Born: 3 August 1965 (age 61) Nagahama, Shiga, Japan
- Party: Liberal Democratic
- Education: Kyoto University

Kenichiro Ueno (上野 賢一郎, Ueno Kenichirō; born 3 August 1965) is a Japanese politician of the Liberal Democratic Party, who serves as a member of the House of Representatives in the Diet (national legislature). A native of Nagahama, Shiga and graduate of Kyoto University, he joined the Ministry of Home Affairs (now part of the Ministry of Internal Affairs and Communications) in 1990. After an unsuccessful run 2003, he was elected for the first time in 2005. In 2010, he ran for governor of Shiga, but lost to incumbent Yukiko Kada. He has served as Minister of Health, Labour and Welfare since 21 October 2025.

== See also ==
- Koizumi Children

House of Representatives (Japan)
Preceded by Tatsuo Kawabata	Member of the House of Representatives from Shiga 1st district 2005–2009	Succeeded by Tatsuo Kawabata
Preceded by Issei Tajima	Member of the House of Representatives from Shiga 2nd district 2012–present	Incumbent
