= Nishiazai, Shiga =

Dissolved municipality in Shiga prefecture, Japan

Coordinates: 35°29′55″N 136°07′25″E

Location of Nishiazai in Shiga Prefecture

Nishiazai (西浅井町, Nishiazai-chō) was a town located in Ika District, Shiga Prefecture, Japan. It is on the northern tip of Lake Biwa.

As of 2003, the town had an estimated population of 4,735 and a density of 70.62 persons per km^{2}. The total area was 67.05 km^{2}.

On January 1, 2010, Nishiazai, along with the towns of Kohoku and Torahime (both from Higashiazai District), and the towns of Kinomoto, Takatsuki and Yogo (all from Ika District), was merged into the expanded city of Nagahama. Higashiazai District and Ika District were both dissolved as a result of this merger.
