= Nagahama, Shiga =

Nagahama 長浜市
- City
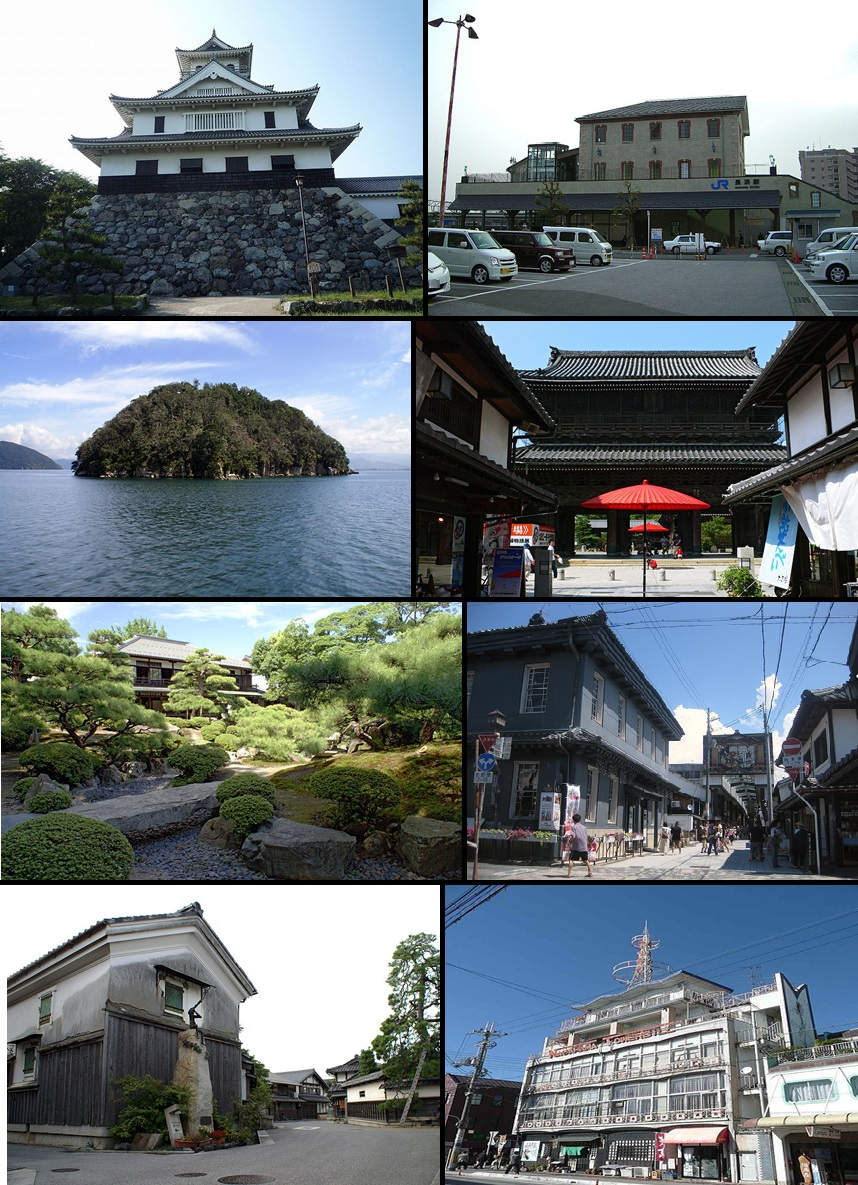
Nagahama Castle	Nagahama Station
Chikubushima	Nagahama Gobo
Keiun-kan	Kurokabe Square
Kunitomo area	Nagahama Tower
- Flag Seal

- Location of Nagahama in Shiga Prefecture

- Location in Japan
- Coordinates: 35°23′N 136°17′E
- Country: Japan
- Region: Kansai
- Prefecture: Shiga
- First official recorded: 459 AD (official)
- Town settled: April 1, 1889
- City settled: April 1, 1943

Government
  - Mayor: Nobuyoshi Asami (from March 2022)

Area
  - Total: 680.79 km^{2} (262.85 sq mi)

Population (November 1, 2021)
  - Total: 116,043
  - Density: 170.45/km^{2} (441.47/sq mi)
- Time zone: UTC+09:00 (JST)
- City hall address: 12-34 Takada-chō, Nagahama-shi, Shiga-ken 526-8501
- Climate: Cfa
- Website: Official website

Nagahama (長浜市, Nagahama-shi) is a city located in Shiga Prefecture, Japan. As of 1 November 2021, the city had an estimated population of 116,043 in 46858 households and a population density of 120 persons per km^{2}. The total area of the city is 680.79 square kilometres (262.85 sq mi).

== Geography ==
Nagahama is located on the northern shore of Lake Biwa and occupies most of the northern portion of Shiga Prefecture. It is generally bounded by the Ibuki Mountains to the east, the Nosaka Mountains to the north and Lake Biwa to the south. The city is the second largest in the prefecture in terms of land area, after Takashima. The inland areas of the city are noted for very heavy snow accumulation in winter.

=== Neighboring municipalities ===
Fukui Prefecture

- Echizen
- Tsuruga

Gifu Prefecture

- Ibigawa

Shiga Prefecture

- Maibara
- Takashima

=== Climate ===
Nagahama has a humid subtropical climate (Köppen Cfa) characterized by warm summers and cool winters with light to no snowfall. The average annual temperature in Nagahama is 12.0 °C. The average annual rainfall is 2052 mm with July as the wettest month. The temperatures are highest on average in August, at around 24.0 °C, and lowest in January, at around 0.3 °C.

Climate data for Nagahama (1991−2020 normals, extremes 1978−present)
Month	Jan	Feb	Mar	Apr	May	Jun	Jul	Aug	Sep	Oct	Nov	Dec	Year
Record high °C (°F)	16.0 (60.8)	19.3 (66.7)	22.7 (72.9)	28.1 (82.6)	32.0 (89.6)	34.0 (93.2)	37.4 (99.3)	37.4 (99.3)	36.0 (96.8)	31.2 (88.2)	23.9 (75.0)	20.3 (68.5)	37.4 (99.3)
Mean daily maximum °C (°F)	6.8 (44.2)	7.6 (45.7)	12.0 (53.6)	17.8 (64.0)	22.7 (72.9)	26.2 (79.2)	30.1 (86.2)	31.9 (89.4)	27.6 (81.7)	21.7 (71.1)	15.6 (60.1)	9.7 (49.5)	19.1 (66.4)
Daily mean °C (°F)	2.9 (37.2)	3.3 (37.9)	6.8 (44.2)	12.2 (54.0)	17.4 (63.3)	21.4 (70.5)	25.5 (77.9)	26.7 (80.1)	22.7 (72.9)	16.7 (62.1)	10.7 (51.3)	5.5 (41.9)	14.3 (57.7)
Mean daily minimum °C (°F)	−0.4 (31.3)	−0.5 (31.1)	2.0 (35.6)	6.8 (44.2)	12.3 (54.1)	17.3 (63.1)	21.8 (71.2)	22.8 (73.0)	18.6 (65.5)	12.1 (53.8)	6.1 (43.0)	1.7 (35.1)	10.0 (50.0)
Record low °C (°F)	−9.4 (15.1)	−11.4 (11.5)	−6.9 (19.6)	−2.2 (28.0)	1.9 (35.4)	6.6 (43.9)	12.8 (55.0)	12.8 (55.0)	7.4 (45.3)	0.8 (33.4)	−2.4 (27.7)	−5.8 (21.6)	−11.4 (11.5)
Average precipitation mm (inches)	137.2 (5.40)	104.4 (4.11)	111.3 (4.38)	108.3 (4.26)	138.0 (5.43)	164.7 (6.48)	218.3 (8.59)	125.1 (4.93)	160.3 (6.31)	131.5 (5.18)	94.8 (3.73)	137.9 (5.43)	1,627.4 (64.07)
Average precipitation days (≥ 1.0 mm)	17.9	14.6	13.3	11.0	10.1	11.8	12.3	8.8	10.5	10.0	11.1	17.0	148.4
Mean monthly sunshine hours	91.6	113.5	159.3	184.5	198.0	153.7	168.9	216.0	164.3	159.9	128.6	98.8	1,830.6
Source: Japan Meteorological Agency

Climate data for Yanegase (Former Yogo Town, 1991−2020 normals)
Month	Jan	Feb	Mar	Apr	May	Jun	Jul	Aug	Sep	Oct	Nov	Dec	Year
Average precipitation mm (inches)	328.0 (12.91)	226.9 (8.93)	203.6 (8.02)	169.4 (6.67)	194.6 (7.66)	213.7 (8.41)	301.7 (11.88)	187.8 (7.39)	237.2 (9.34)	181.0 (7.13)	205.7 (8.10)	361.4 (14.23)	2,809.4 (110.61)
Average snowfall cm (inches)	193 (76)	156 (61)	58 (23)	3 (1.2)	0 (0)	0 (0)	0 (0)	0 (0)	0 (0)	0 (0)	0 (0)	91 (36)	488 (192)
Average precipitation days (≥ 1.0 mm)	21.8	18.1	16.3	13.1	12.1	13.0	13.9	10.9	12.8	12.6	15.0	21.3	180.9
Average snowy days (≥ 3 cm)	15.1	13.4	6.8	0.4	0	0	0	0	0	0	0	6.8	42.5
Source: Japan Meteorological Agency (Averages：1991-2020)

== Demographics ==
Per Japanese census data, the population of Nagahama has remained relatively stable over the past 70 years.

Historical population
Year	Pop.	±%
1920	99,354	—
1930	103,897	+4.6%
1940	102,065	−1.8%
1950	122,076	+19.6%
1960	117,066	−4.1%
1970	114,977	−1.8%
1980	119,988	+4.4%
1990	121,481	+1.2%
2000	123,862	+2.0%
2010	124,131	+0.2%
2020	113,636	−8.5%

== History ==
Nagahama is part of ancient Ōmi Province and has been settled since at least the Yayoi period. During the Sengoku period, the area was contested between the Kyogoku clan, Azai clan and Asakura clan. The city center was developed and renamed by Toyotomi Hideyoshi when Hideyoshi moved the center of his administration from Odani Castle. Kunitomo (国友), the northeast of the city center, had been known for the production of arquebuses and guns since 1544. The settlement was originally called Imahama (今濱), but Hideyoshi renamed it "Nagahama", taking one kanji from the name of his overlord, Oda Nobunaga. It is not related to the area of the same name in Fukuoka City and same name town in Ehime Prefecture. In the Edo period, it was largely under the control of Hikone Domain under the Tokugawa shogunate; however, the jin'ya of Ōmi-Miyagawa Domain, a 13,000 koku feudal holding under a cadet branch of the Hotta clan was located in what is now southeastern Nagahama. After the Meiji restoration, the town of Nagahama was established within Sakata District, Shiga with the creation of the modern municipalities system.

On April 1, 1943, Nagahama annexed the neighboring villages of Kamiteru, Rokusho, Minamigori, Kitagori, Nishikuroda and Kanda to form the city of Nagahama. On February 13, 2006, the towns of Azai and Biwa (both from Higashiazai District) were merged into Nagahama. On January 1, 2010, the towns of Kohoku and Torahime (both from Higashiazai District), and the towns of Kinomoto, Nishiazai, Takatsuki and Yogo (all from Ika District) were merged into Nagahama. Both districts were thereby dissolved as a result of this merger.

The current city thus consists of areas once within three former districts: Sakata District, Higashiazai District and Ika District.

== Government ==
Nagahama has a mayor-council form of government with a directly elected mayor and a unicameral city council of 26 members. Nagahama contributes four members to the Shiga Prefectural Assembly. In terms of national politics, the city is part of Shiga 2nd district of the lower house of the Diet of Japan.

== Economy ==
The economy of Nagahama is centered on agriculture and light manufacturing.

== Education ==
Nagahama has 23 public elementary schools and ten public middle schools and two combined elementary/middle schools operated by the city government. There are five public high schools operated by the Shiga Prefectural Department of Education. The prefecture also operates two special education schools for the handicapped.

International schools:

- Colégio Sun Family - Brazilian primary school

== Transportation ==
=== Railway ===
JR West – Hokuriku Main Line

- Nagahama - Torahime - Kawake - Takatsuki - Kinomoto - Yogo

JR West – Kosei Line

- Nagahara - Ōmi-Shiotsu

=== Highway ===
- Hokuriku Expressway
- National Route 8
- National Route 303
- National Route 365

=== Air ===
The nearest airport is Chubu Centrair International Airport, located 125 km (78 mi) south east of Nagahama.

== Sister cities ==
=== Within Japan ===
- (Japan) Nishinoomote, Kagoshima
- (Japan) Tatsuno, Hyōgo

=== Outside Japan ===
- Augsburg, Bavaria, Germany
- Holland, Michigan, United States (informal)
- Verona, Veneto, Italy

== Sightseeing ==
- Anegawa River
- Central Nagahama
  - Daitsū-ji Temple, the largest temple in central Nagahama
  - Chizen-in Temple
  - Hōkoku Shrine
  - Jinsho-ji Temple
  - Kurokabe Square (aka "Black Wall Square"), shopping streets centered a black wall glasswork shop which made use of an old bank building.
  - Nagahama Bonbai (bonsai of ume) event on January 20 to March 10, every year, since 1952.
  - Nagahama Castle
  - The Old Nagahama Station Museum, built in 1882 and the oldest preserved railroad station in Japan.
  - The Nagahama Roman Beer Brewery
  - Nagahama Flintlock Gun Museum
  - Nagahama Hachimangu Shrine
  - Nagahama Hikiyama Festival event on April 13–16, every year, since Azuchi-Momoyama period.
  - Shana-in Temple
  - Soji-ji Temple
- Tonda Traditional Bunraku Puppet Troupe
- Lake Biwa
  - Chikubu Island
- Mount Shizugatake
- Odani Castle

== Cuisine ==
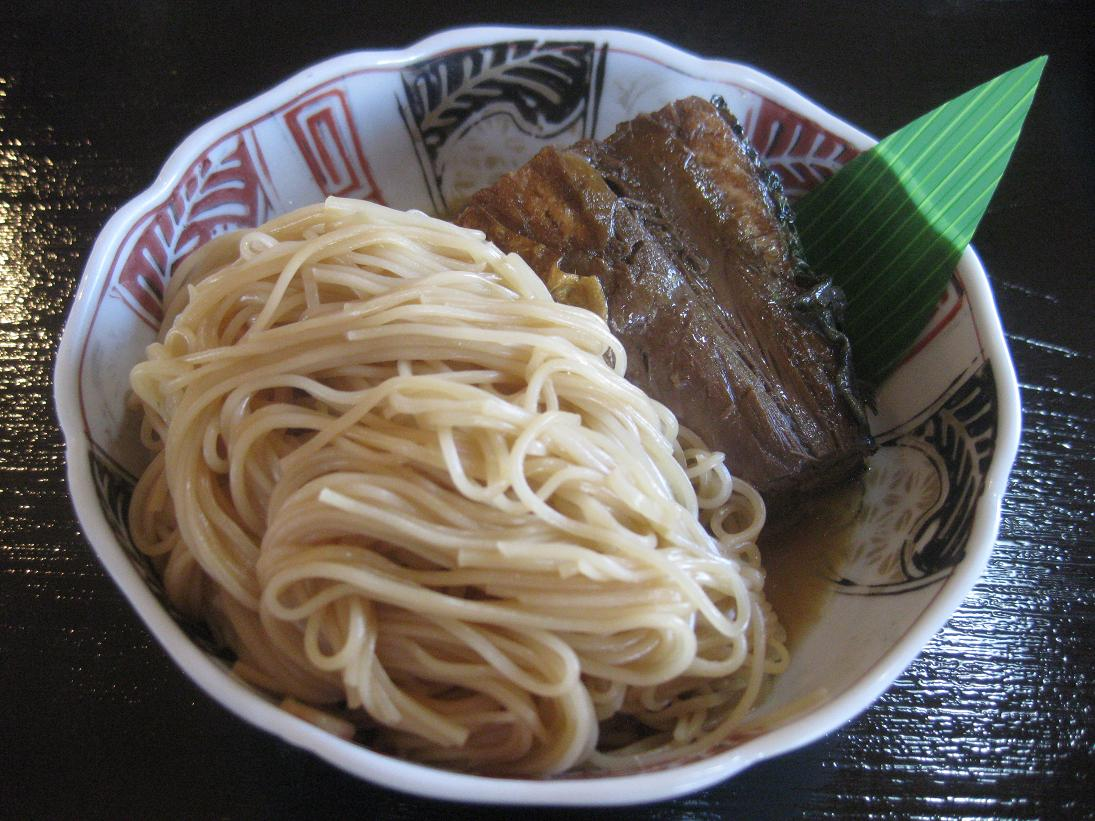
Nagahama yaki-saba sōmen

In addition to the usual Shiga Prefecture cuisine, most famously funa-zushi, Nagahama has a local specialty of salty-sweet cooked sōmen with mackerel (焼鯖素麺, yaki-saba sōmen), related to its historical position on the "mackerel highway" connecting the fishing ports on the Sea of Japan with Kyoto.

== Noted people from Nagahama ==
- Kenichiro Ueno, politician
- Shimon Sakaguchi, Nobel laureate

== Gallery ==
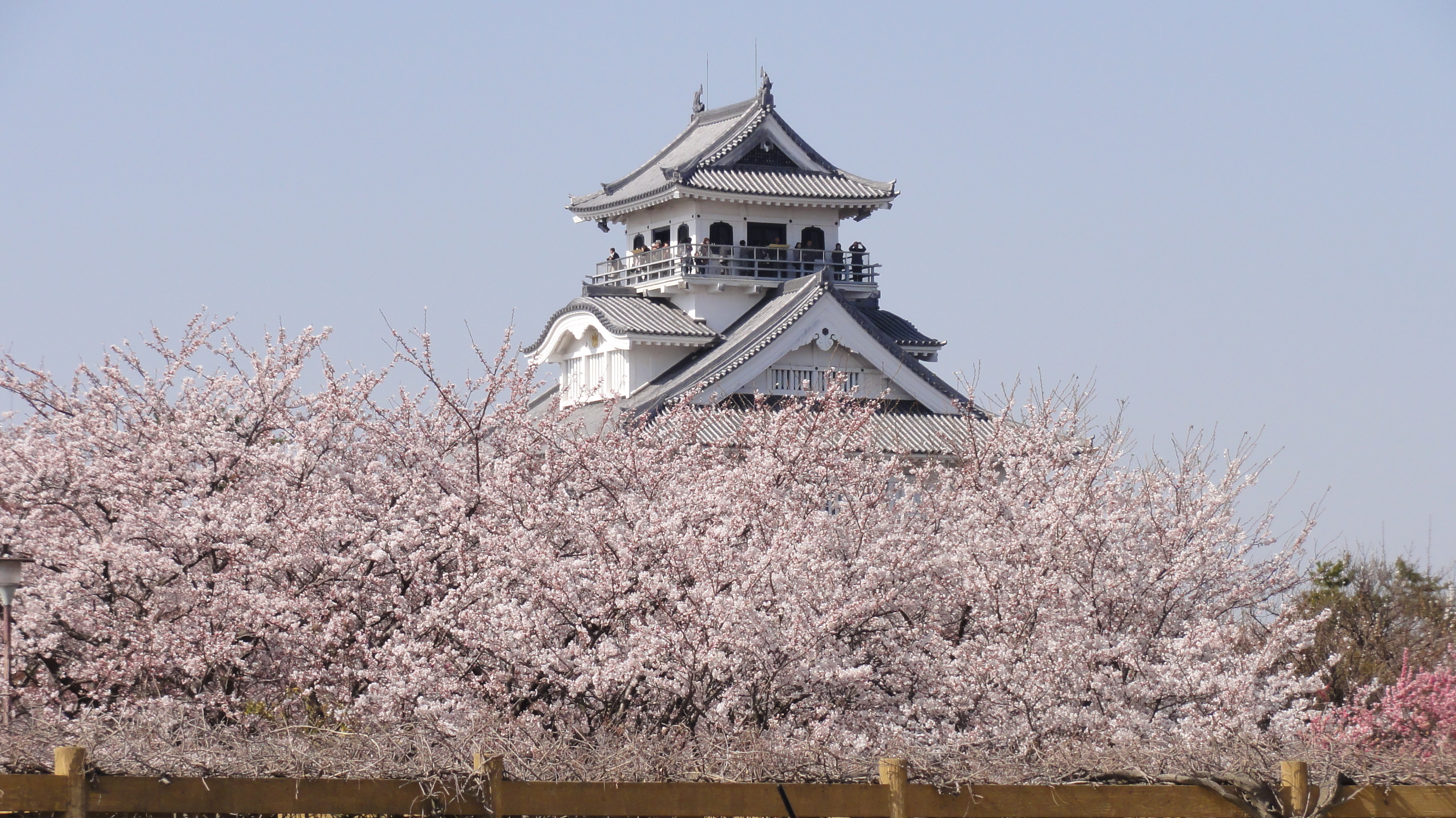
Nagahama Castle in the spring

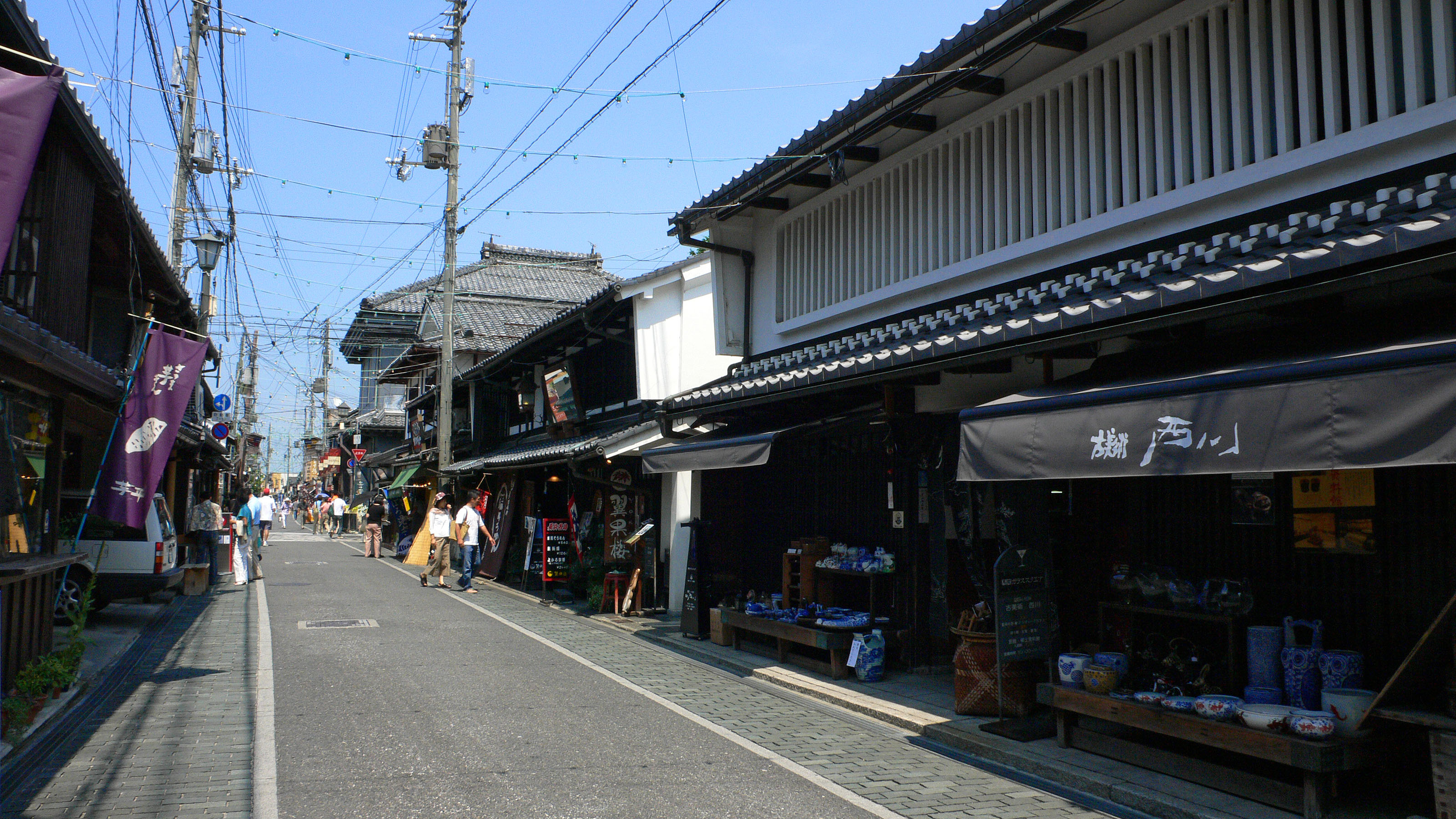
Kurokabe Square

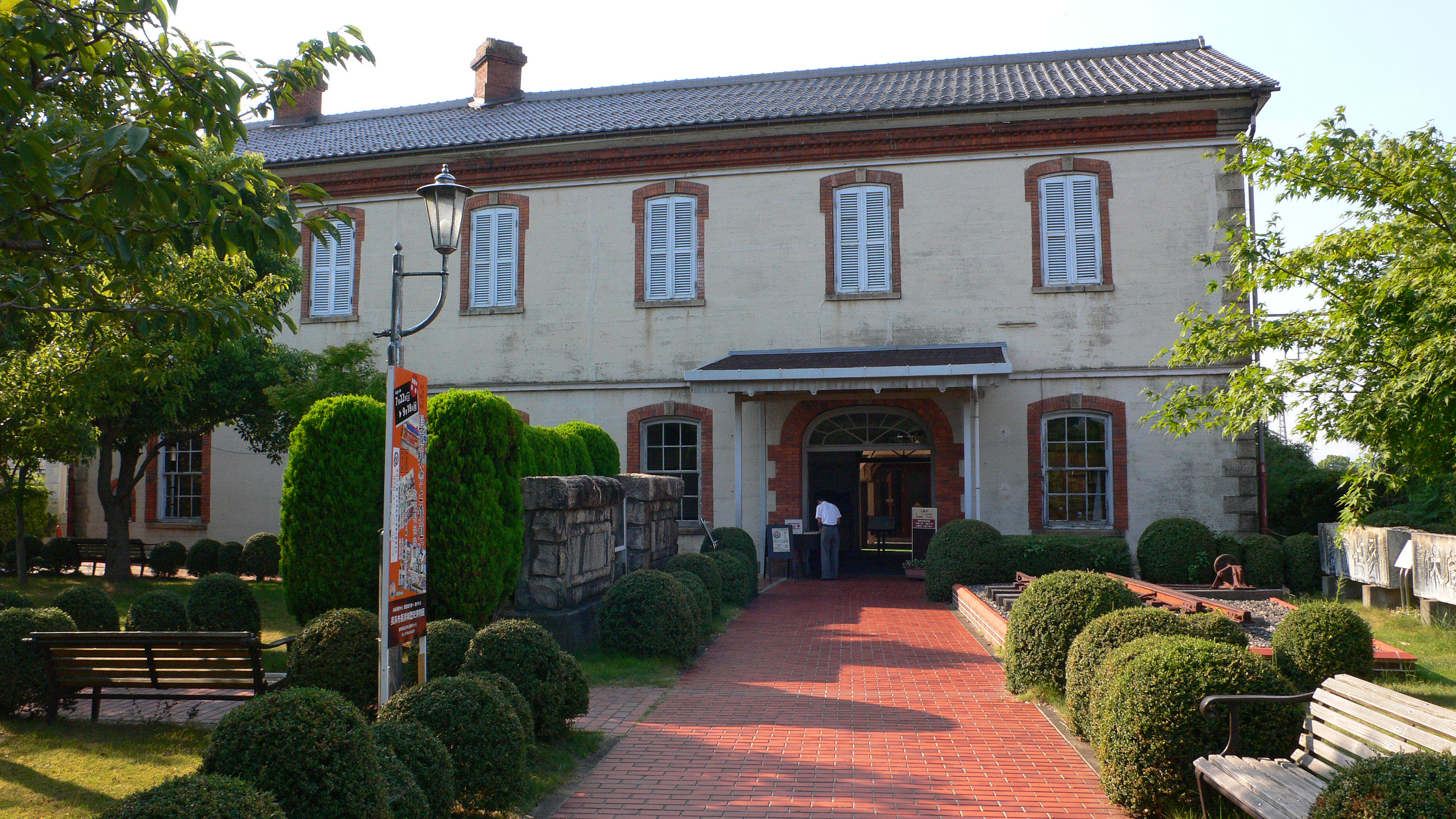
Old Nagahama Station

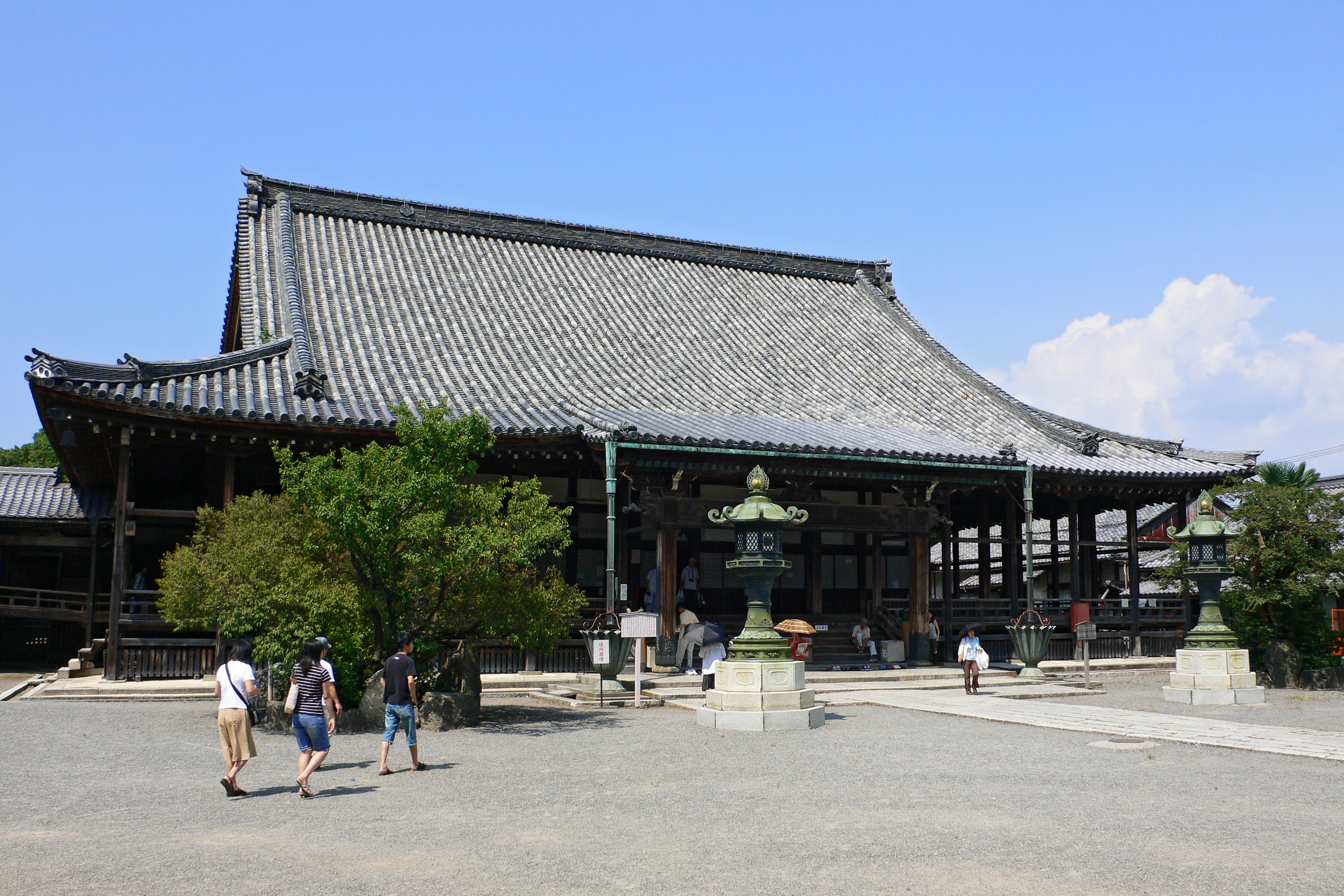
Daitsu-ji Temple

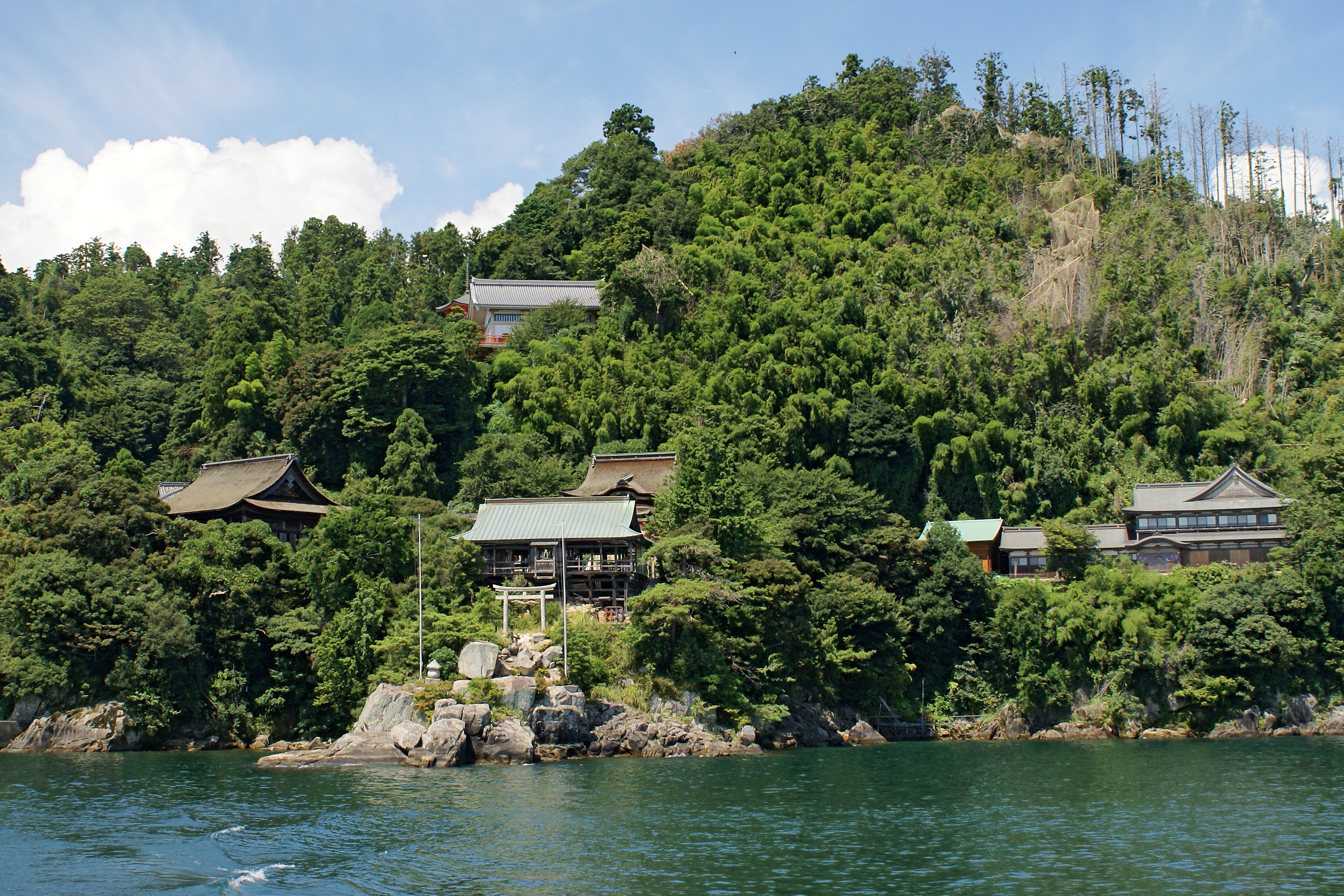
Chikubu Island

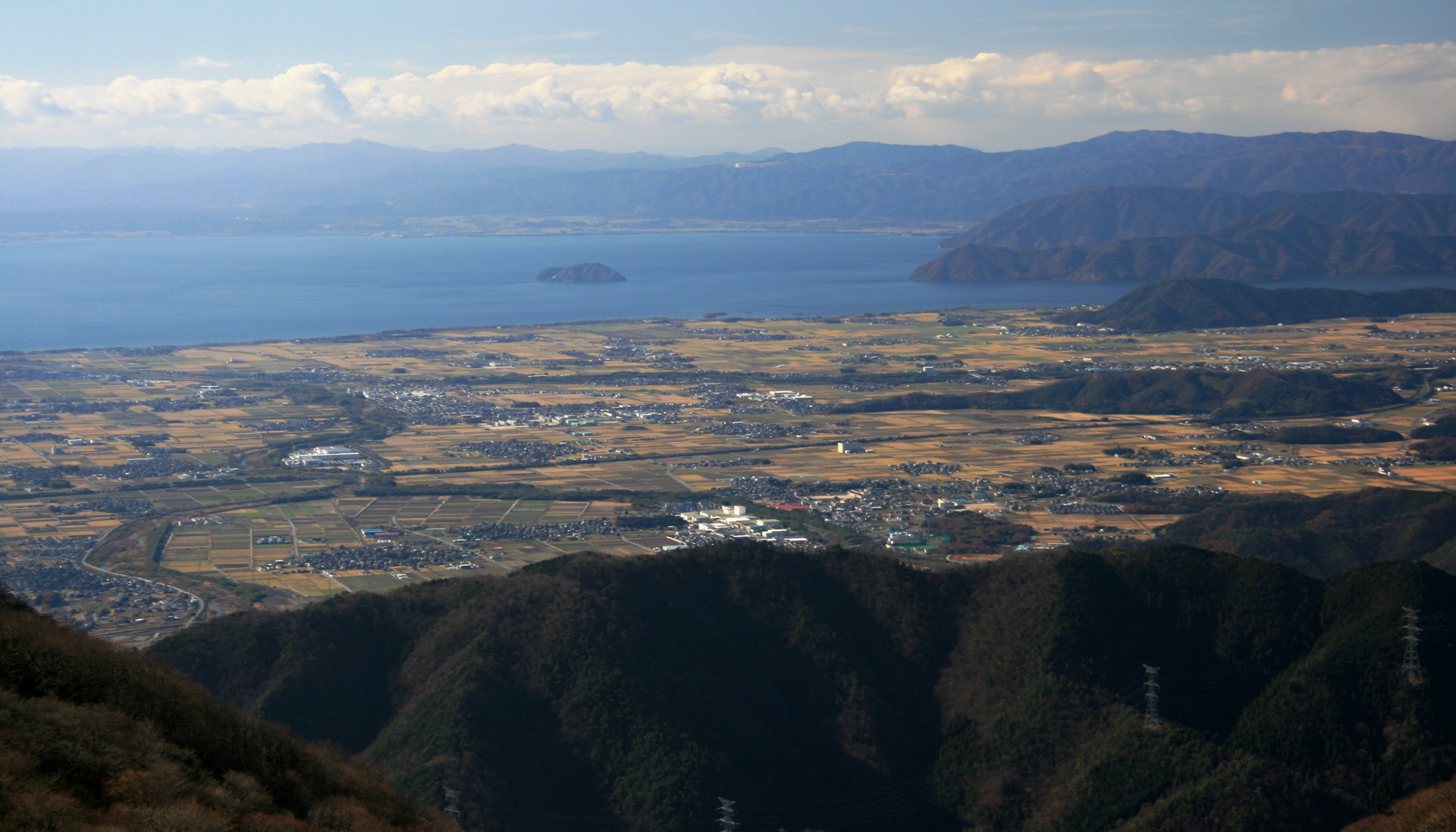
View of Lake Biwa and Chikubu Island

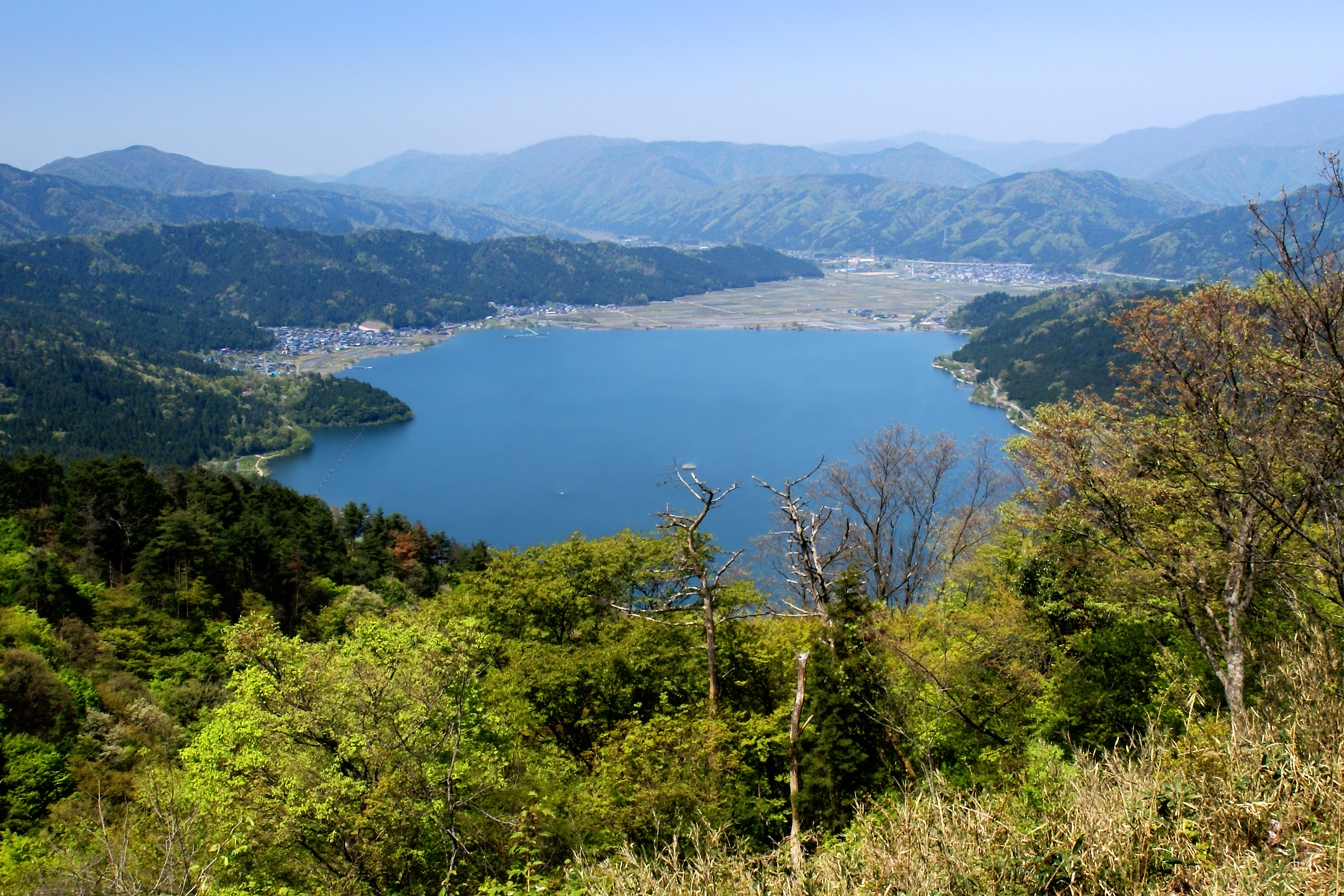
Lake Yogo
