= Biwa, Shiga =

Japanese town in Higashiazai District

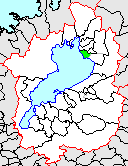
Biwa in Shiga prefecture.

Biwa (びわ町, Biwa-chō) was a town located in Higashiazai District, Shiga Prefecture, Japan. It was on the northeastern shore of Lake Biwa, as that was where the town got its name. Chikubu Island was under the administration of Biwa.

As of 2003, the town had an estimated population of 7,599 and a population density of 447.53 persons per km^{2}. The total area was 16.98 km^{2}.

On February 13, 2006, Biwa, along with the town of Azai (also from Higashiazai District), was merged into the expanded city of Nagahama.

Biwa-cho was the home of the Tonda Traditional Bunraku Puppet Troupe, a troupe founded in the 1830s in the tradition of Bunraku puppetry. The Tonda Troupe has performed internationally four times in the United States and Australia.
