= Higashiazai District, Shiga =

Former district in Shiga prefecture, Japan

Coordinates: 35.3713°N 136.3946°E

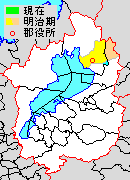
Map of Higashiazai District with Meiji period (1890) area in yellow

Higashiazai (東浅井郡, Higashiazai-gun) was a district located in Shiga Prefecture, Japan.

At the 2005 Census, the district was estimated to have a population of 14,509. The total area was 38.53 km^{2}.

== Timeline ==
- April 1, 1971 – The village of Biwa gained town status.
- February 13, 2006 – The towns of Azai and Biwa were merged into the expanded city of Nagahama.
- January 1, 2010 – The towns of Kohoku and Torahime were merged with the expanded city of Nagahama. Higashiazai District was dissolved as a result of this merger.

== Mergers ==
- On February 13, 2006, the towns of Azai and Biwa were merged into the expanded city of Nagahama.
- On January 1, 2010, the towns of Kohoku and Torahime, along with the towns of Kinomoto, Nishiazai, Takatsuki and Yogo (all from Ika District) were merged with the expanded city of Nagahama. Higashiazai District and Ika District were both dissolved as a result of this merger.
