= Takatsuki, Shiga =

Dissolved municipality in Shiga prefecture, Japan

Coordinates: 35°30′N 136°12′E

Location of Takatsuki in Shiga Prefecture

Takatsuki (高月町, Takatsuki-chō) was a town located in Ika District, Shiga Prefecture, Japan.

== Population ==
As of 2003, the town had an estimated population of 10,411 and a population density of 368.27 persons per km^{2}. The total area was 28.27 km^{2}.

== History ==
On January 1, 2010, Takatsuki, along with the towns of Kohoku and Torahime (both from Higashiazai District), and the towns of Kinomoto, Nishiazai, and Yogo (all from Ika District), was merged into the expanded city of Nagahama. Higashiazai District and Ika District were both dissolved as a result of this merger.
