= Azai, Shiga =

Town in Shiga Prefecture, Japan

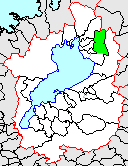
Azai in Shiga

Azai (浅井町, Azai-chō) was a town located in Higashiazai District, Shiga Prefecture, Japan. In Sengoku period, Azai clan based here and Battle of Anegawa broke out.

As of 2003, the town had an estimated population of 13,055 and a density of 149.90 persons per km^{2}. The total area was 87.09 km^{2}.

On February 13, 2006, Azai, along with the town of Biwa (also from Higashiazai District), was merged into the expanded city of Nagahama.

== Sister town ==
- Wentworth, New South Wales, Australia
