= Torahime, Shiga =

Dissolved municipality in Shiga prefecture, Japan

Coordinates: 35°25′11″N 136°15′53″E

Location of Torahime in Shiga Prefecture

Torahime (虎姫町, Torahime-chō) was a town located in Higashiazai District, Shiga Prefecture, Japan.

As of 2003, the town had an estimated population of 5,737 and a density of 607.09 persons per km^{2}. The total area was 9.45 km^{2}.

On January 1, 2010, Torahime, along with the towns of Kohoku (also from Higashiazai District), and the towns of Kinomoto, Nishiazai, Takatsuki and Yogo (all from Ika District), was merged into the expanded city of Nagahama. Higashiazai District and Ika District were both dissolved as a result of this merger.
