= Kohoku, Shiga =

Dissolved municipality in Shiga prefecture, Japan

Coordinates: 35°26′47″N 136°14′02″E

Location of Kohoku in Shiga Prefecture

Kohoku (湖北町, Kohoku-chō) was a town located in Higashiazai District, Shiga Prefecture, Japan. The ruins of Odani Castle are located in Kohoku.

As of 2003, the town had an estimated population of 8,745 and a density of 300.72 persons per km^{2}. The total area was 29.08 km^{2}.

On January 1, 2010, Kohoku, along with the towns of Torahime (also from Higashiazai District), and the towns of Kinomoto, Nishiazai, Takatsuki and Yogo (all from Ika District), was merged into the expanded city of Nagahama. Higashiazai District and Ika District were both dissolved as a result of this merger.
