= Takatsuki Station (Shiga) =

Railway station in Nagahama, Shiga Prefecture, Japan

Takatsuki Station 高月駅
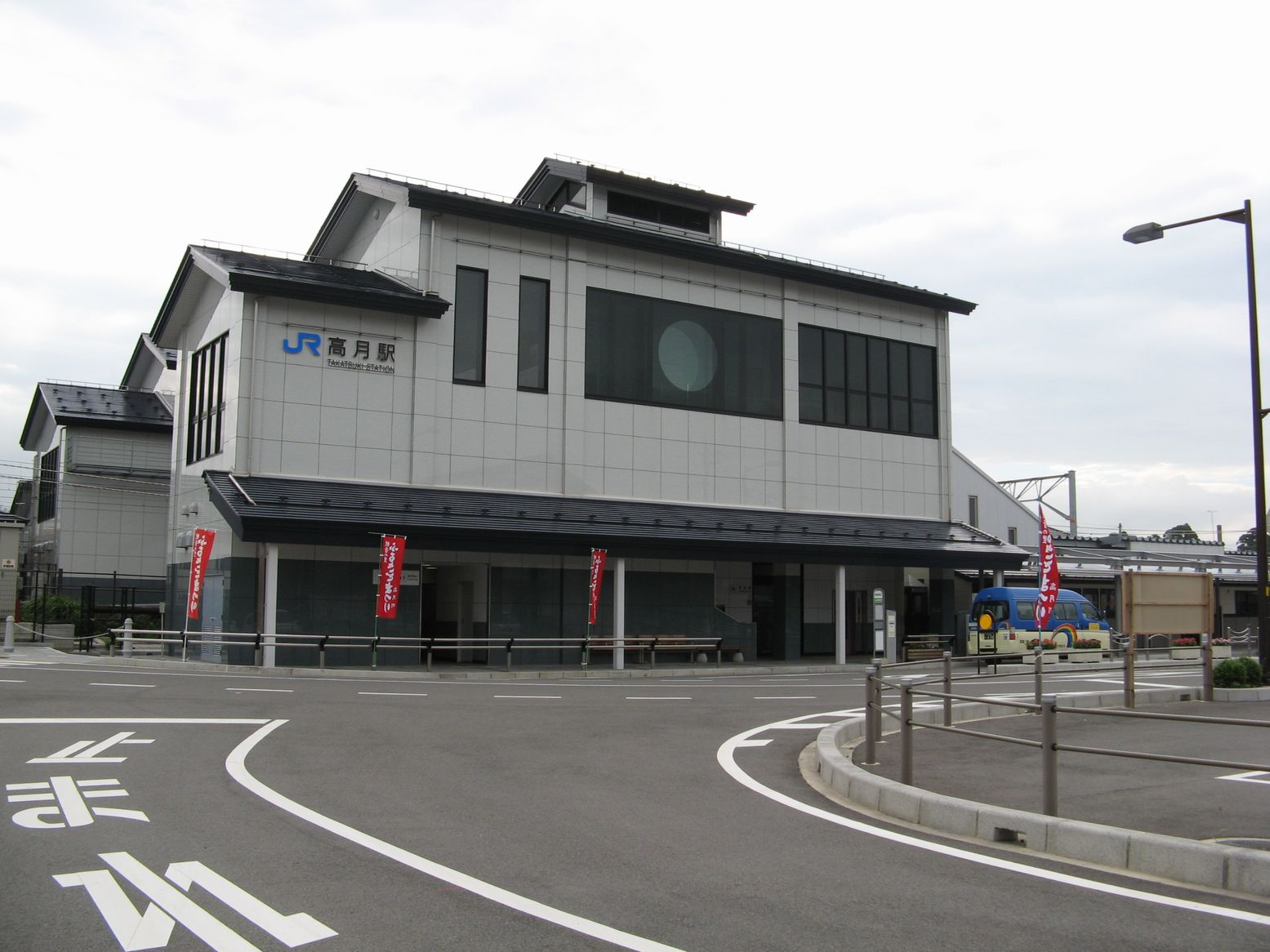
- Takatsuki Station west exit, July 2007

General information
- Location: Takatsukicho Ochikawa 33-26, Nagahama-shi, Shiga-ken 529-0232; Japan
- Coordinates: 35.4704°N 136.2376°E
- System: JR-West regional rail station
- Operator: JR West; JR Freight
- Line: Hokuriku Main Line
- Distance: 18.2 km from Maibara
- Platforms: 2 side platforms

Construction
- Structure type: Ground level

Other information
- Station code: JR-A06
- Website: Official website

History
- Opened: March 10, 1882

Passengers
- FY 2023: 1,302 daily
Location
- Location within Shiga Prefecture Location within Japan

Takatsuki Station (高月駅, Takatsuki-eki) is a passenger railway station located in the city of Nagahama, Shiga, Japan, operated by the West Japan Railway Company (JR West). The station is also a freight depot for the Japan Freight Railway Company (JR Freight).

== Lines ==
Takatsuki Station is served by the Hokuriku Main Line, and is 18.2 kilometers from the terminus of the line at Maibara.

== Station layout ==
The station consists of two opposed side platforms connected by an elevated station building. The station is staffed.

== Platform ==
1	■ Hokuriku Main Line	for Ōmi-Shiotsu, Tsuruga
2	■ Hokuriku Main Line	for Maibara and Kyoto

== Adjacent stations ==
«	Service	»
Hokuriku Main Line
Special Rapid: Does not stop at this station
Limited Express "Hida": Does not stop at this station
Kawake	Local	Kinomoto

== History ==
The station opened on 10 March 1882 on the Japanese Government Railway (JGR). The station came under the aegis of the West Japan Railway Company (JR West) on 1 April 1987 due to the privatization of Japan National Railway.

Station numbering was introduced in March 2018 with Takatsuki being assigned station number JR-A06.

== Passenger statistics ==
In fiscal 2019, the station was used by an average of 726 passengers daily (boarding passengers only).

== Surrounding area ==
- former Takatsuki Town Hall
- Nagahama City Takatsuki Library
- Nagahama City Takatsuki Junior High School
- Nagahama City Takatsuki Elementary School

== See also ==
- List of railway stations in Japan
