= Mikami =

Mikami (三上, 見上, 水上, 民上) is a Japanese name.

== Place Name ==
- Mount Mikami, a mountain in Yasu City, Shiga Prefecture, Japan
- Mikami Shrine, a temple at the foot of Mount Mikami

== Surname ==
Notable people with the surname include:

- Ai Mikami (見上 愛, born 2000), Japanese actress
- Akinori Mikami (三上 明紀, born 1969), Japanese former football player
- Aya Mikami (三上 彩, born 1984), Japanese volleyball player
- Chiyo Mikami (三上 千代, 1891–1978), Japanese nurse, Florence Nightingale Medal recipient
- Gōtarō Mikami (三上 剛太郎, 1869–1964), Japanese medical doctor during the Russo-Japanese War
- Hiroshi Mikami (三上 博史, born 1962), Japanese actor
- Kan Mikami (三上 寛, born 1950), Japanese folk singer-songwriter and actor
- Kazuyoshi Mikami (三上 和良, born 1975), Japanese former football player
- Kensei Mikami (水上 剣星, born 1984), Japanese actor
- Kyohei Mikami (三上 恭平, born 1973), Japanese professional wrestler
- Masashi Mikami (三上 真史, born 1983), Japanese actor
- Masataka Mikami (三上 正貴, born 1988), Japanese rugby union player
- Norio Mikami (三上 法夫, born 1947), Japanese golfer
- Sayaka Mikami (三上 紗也可, born 2000), Japanese diver
- Seiko Mikami (三上 晴子, 1961–2015), Japanese artist
- Shinji Mikami (三上 真司, born 1965), Japanese video game designer, director, producer
- Shiori Mikami (三上 枝織, born 1989), Japanese voice actress
- Shoko Mikami (三上 尚子, born 1981), Japanese former football player and manager
- Takayuki Mikami (三上 孝之, born 1933), Japanese karateka
- Takuya Mikami (三上 卓哉, born 1980), Japanese former football player
- Tomoya Mikami (三上 朋也, born 1989), Japanese professional baseball player
- Yoshio Mikami (三上 義夫, 1875–1950), Japanese mathematician
- Yōsuke Mikami (三上 陽輔, born 1992), Japanese football player
- Yua Mikami (三上 悠亜, born 1993), Japanese idol singer and former AV actress

== Fictional characters ==
- Teru Mikami of Death Note
- Ryo Mikami of Kamen Rider Blade
- Violet Mikami of Chicago fire

== See also ==
- Ghost Sweeper Mikami, Japanese manga series
