= Yasu City History and Folklore Museum =

Museum in Yasu, Shiga, Japan

- 野洲市歴史民俗博物館（銅鐸博物館）
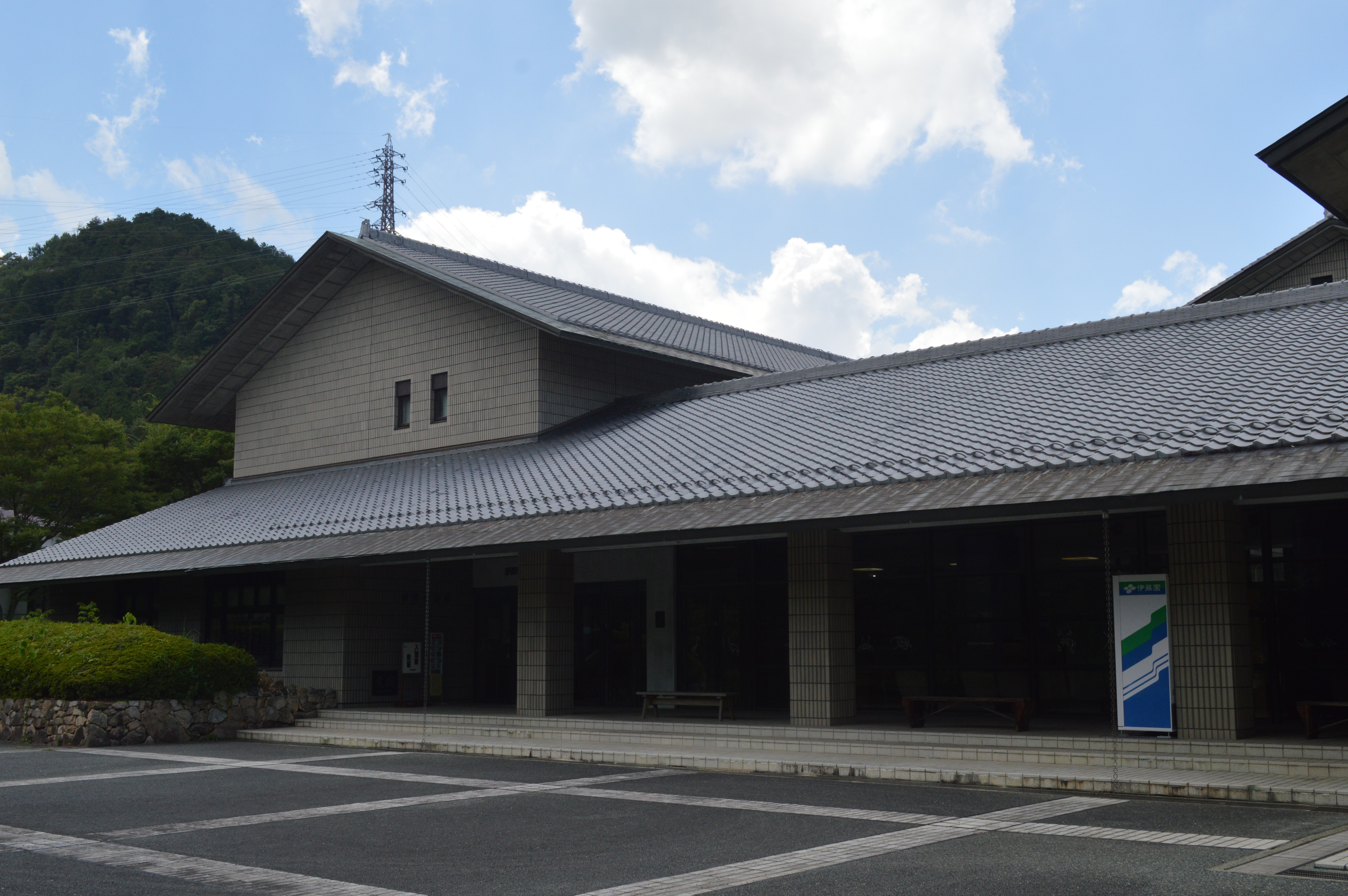
- Interactive map of the Yasu City History and Folklore Museum area
- Alternative names: Dōtaku Museum

General information
- Location: 57-1 Tsuji-machi, Yasu, Shiga Prefecture, Japan
- Coordinates: 35°04′21″N 136°02′42″E
- Opened: 1 November 1988

Website
- Official website (in Japanese)

Yasu City History and Folklore Museum (野洲市歴史民俗博物館, Yasu-shi Rekishi Minzoku Hakubutsukan), also known as the Dōtaku Museum (銅鐸博物館, Dōtaku Hakubutsukan), opened in Yasu, Shiga Prefecture, Japan in 1988. Originally the town museum, with the merger of the former Yasu Town with Chūzu to form Yasu City on 1 October 2004, the museum was renamed accordingly (町立→市). The collection and displays have two main areas of focus, the dōtaku of Ōiwayama and the history and folkways of the area. Next to the museum is Yayoi no Mori Historical Park, with reconstruction pit-dwellings and a raised storehouse.

== See also ==
- Ōiwayama Kofun Cluster
