= Ōiwayama Kofun Cluster =

- 大岩山古墳群 (Japanese)
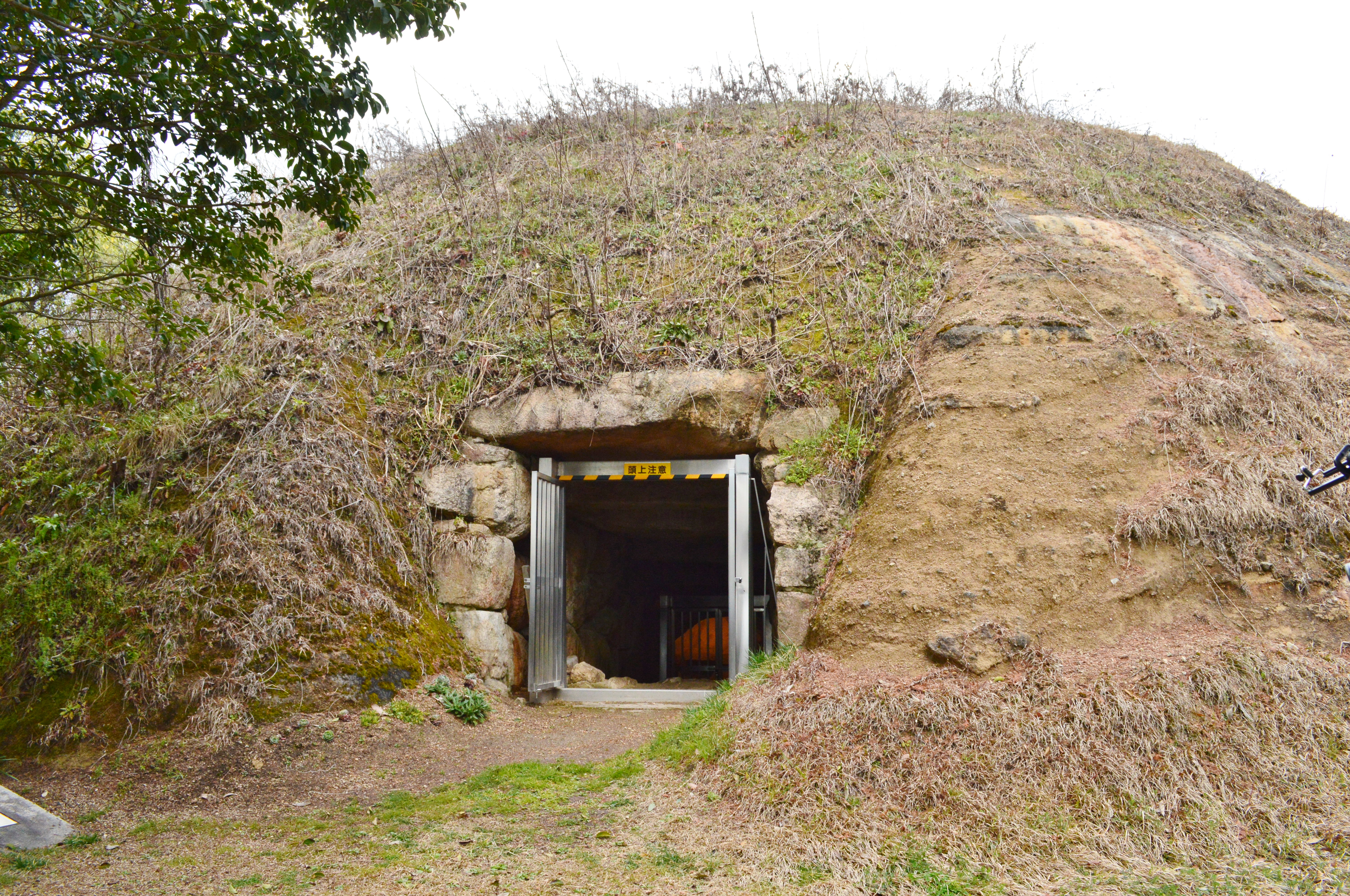
- Entry to Kabutoyama Kofun

- Ōiwayama Kofun Cluster Ōiwayama Kofun Cluster (Japan)
- 35°04′38″N 136°02′31″E
- Type: Kofun cluster
- Periods: Kofun period
- Location: Yasu, Shiga, Japan
- Region: Kansai region

History
- Built: 3rd to 6th century AD

Site notes
- Public access: Yes (no public facilities)

The Ōiwayama Kofun Cluster (大岩山古墳群) is a group of Kofun to early Nara period burial mound cluster located in the Koshinohara neighborhood of the city of Yasu, Shiga in the Kansai region of Japan. It was designated a National Historic Site of Japan in 1941, with the area under designation expanded in 1982, 1983 and 1995.

== Overview ==
The Ōiwayama Kofun Cluster is located in a fertile alluvial plain formed by the Yasu River. In 1881, 14 dōtaku were discovered on Mount Ōiwa, and ten more were found in two separate locations in 1962 during construction work on the tracks of the Tōkaidō Shinkansen. This was one of the largest concentrations of dōtaku which has been discovered, and to commemorate this find, Yasu city constructed the Dōtaku Museum (銅鐸博物館, Dōtaku Hakubutsukan) to display these artifacts, as well as others which have been found in other locations. These artifacts date from the late Yayoi period and the fact that they were buried intentionally was interpreted to be an indication of the unsettled political condition during the transition between the Yayoi and Kofun periods. The very large concentration was also interpreted to indicate that a large regional tribe or clan lived in this area, and this theory was supported by a large concentration of burial mounds in the flatlands surrounding Mount Ōiwa.

The Ōiwayama Kofun Cluster consists of 17 confirmed tumuli, from the latter half of the 3rd century to the 6th century AD, or spanning the end of the Yayoi to the end of the Kofun period. Of these tumuli, the Maruyama Kofun (円山古墳), a "two conjoined rectangles" type (zenpō-kōhō-fun (前方後方墳)) and Kabutoyama Kofun (甲山古墳), a circular-type (empun (円墳)) which has the largest stone burial chamber in Shiga Prefecture, were designated as National Historic Sites in 1941. The Toba Kofun (冨波古墳), another zenpō-kōhō-fun was discovered in 1982 and added to the National Historic Site designation the same year. In 1985, six previously unknown tumuli were discovered and were also added to the area under protection, which then received the collective name of "Ōiwayama Kofun Cluster". The borders of the area under protection were adjusted in 1995. The site is now part of the Sakuraba-sama Historical Park, and is a short walk from the "Dotaku Museum Mae" bus stop on the Omi Railway bus from Yasu Station on the JR West Tōkaidō Main Line. Artifacts uncovered during archaeological excavations have included bronze mirrors, earthenware, haniwa and Sue ware pottery.

Ōiwayama Kofun Cluster main tumuli
Kofun name	Coordinates	Type	Size	Date	Remarks
Toba Tumulus	35°4′49.27″N 136°1′54.20″E	zenpō-kōhō-fun	length 42 meters	3rd century	oldest in the cluster
Kotobayama Kofun	35°4′43.25″N 136°1′54.57″E	enpun	dia 30m	late 3rd century	
Otsukayama Kofun	35°4′38.60″N 136°2′30.65″E	hotategai-gata		early 5th century	
Kamezuka Kofun	35°4′48.05″N 136°1′58.20″E	hotategai-gata	length 45m	late 5th century	
Tennoyama Kofun	35°4′25.10″N 136°2′24.37″E	zenpō-kōen-fun	ength 50 meters	early 6th century	
Maruyama Kofun	35°4′26.82″N 136°2′28.35″E	enpun	dia 28 meters	early 6th century	
Kabutoyama Kofun	35°4′28.62″N 136°2′24.90″E	enpun	dia 30 meters	mid 6th century	
Miyayama No. 2 Kofun	35°4′24.60″N 136°2′41.30″E	enpun	dia 15 meters	late 6th century	

== Gallery ==
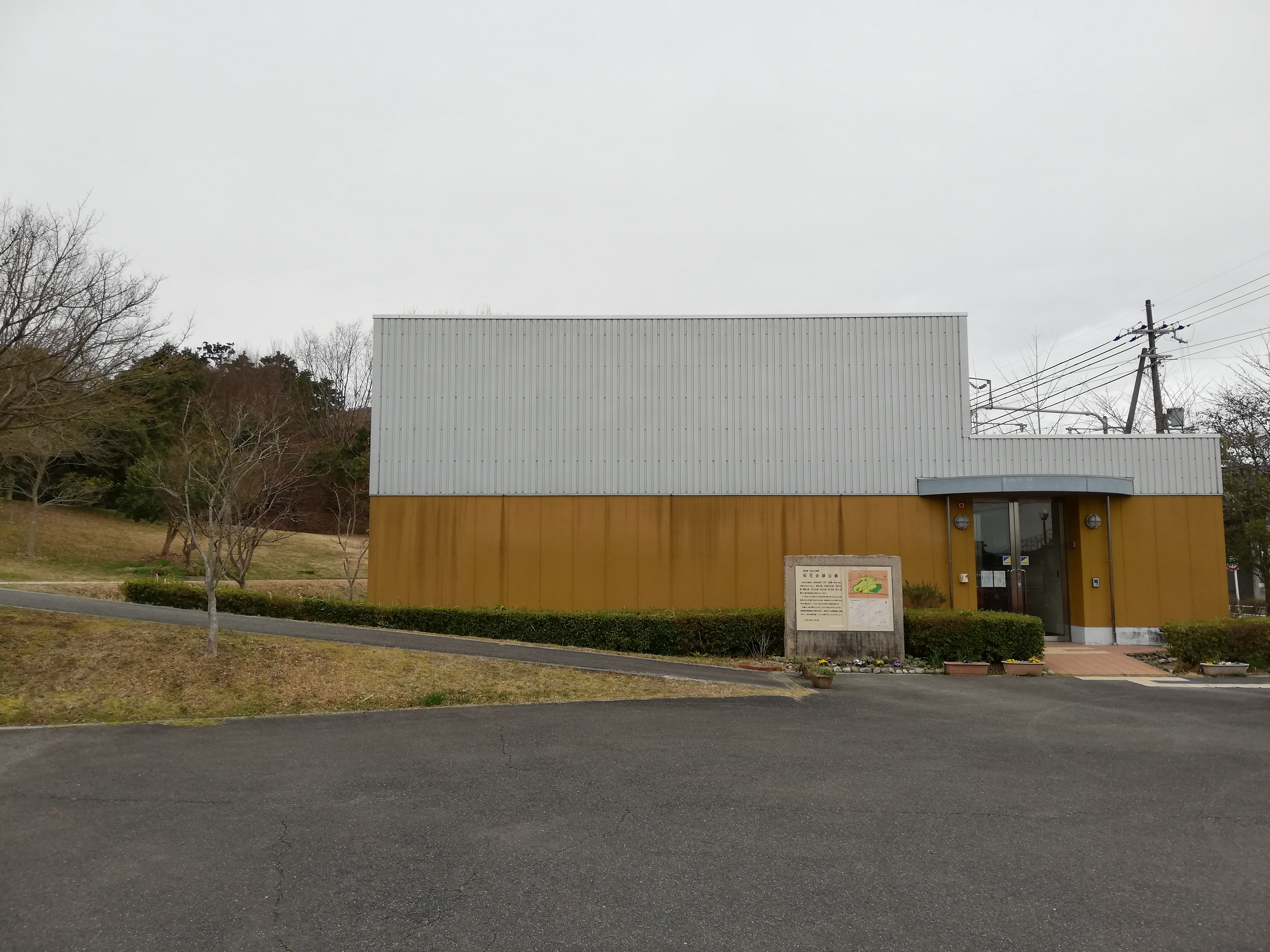
Sakurabasama Historic Park

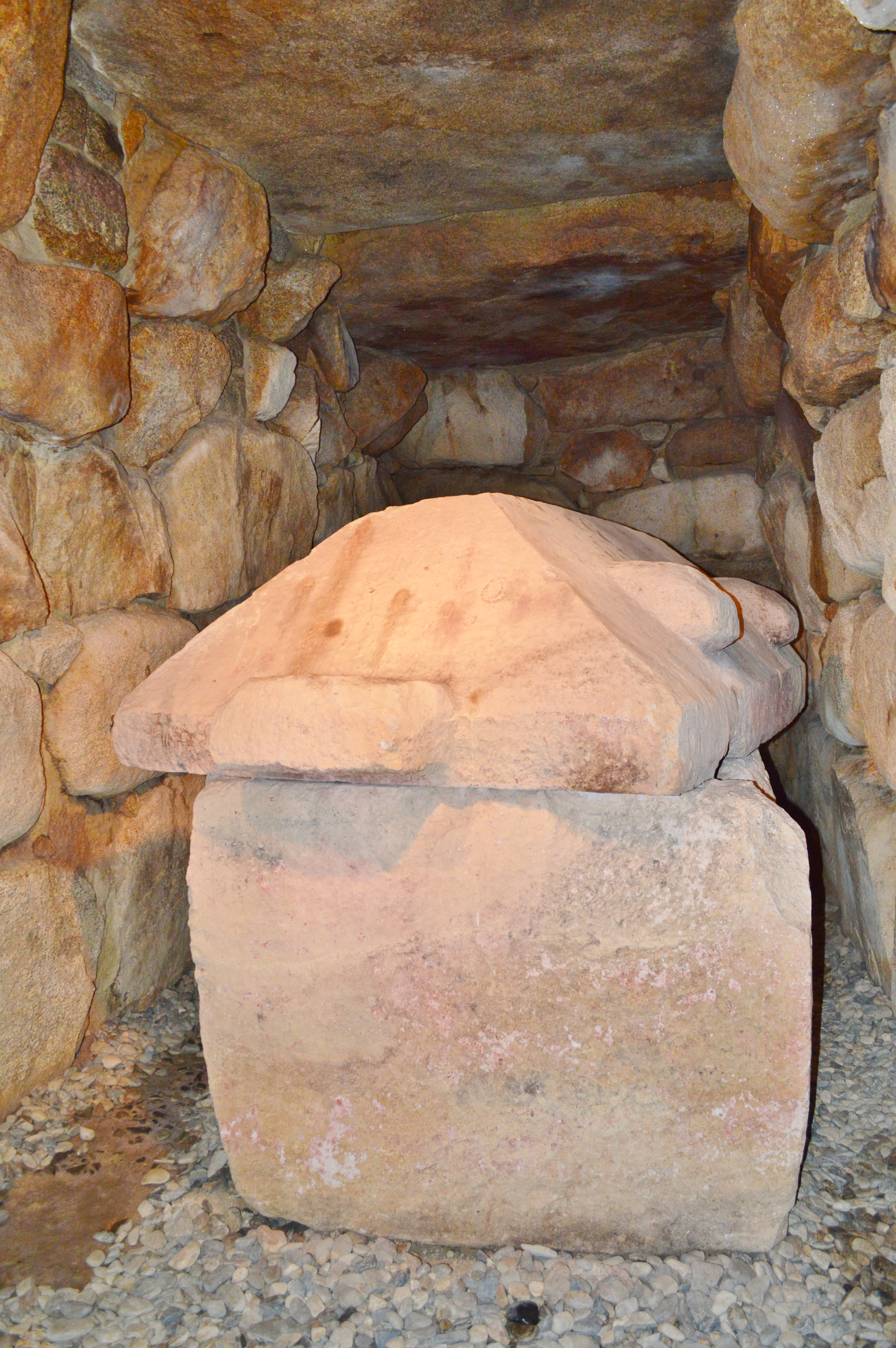
Kabutoyama Kofun sarcophagus

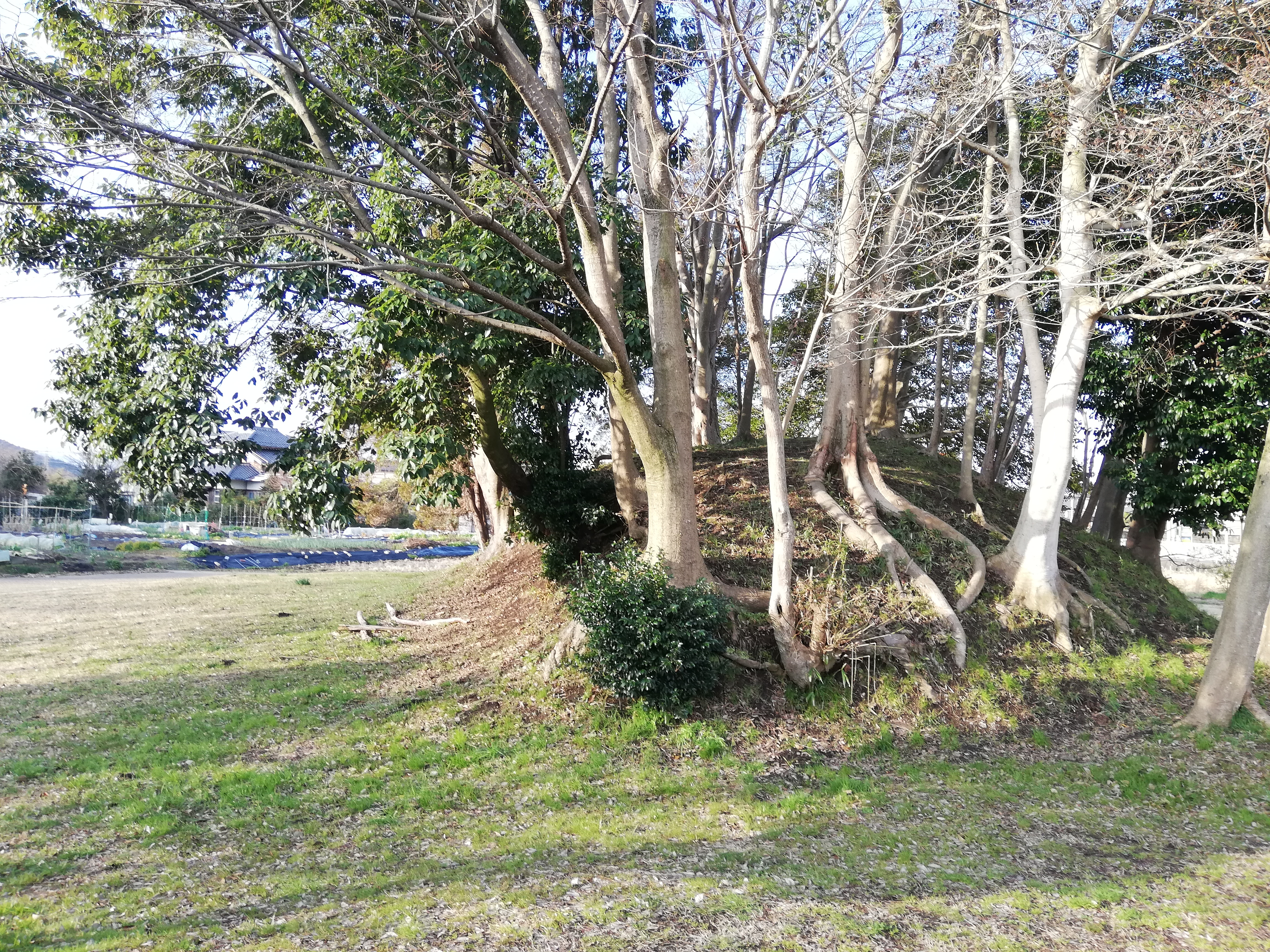
Kamezuka Kofun

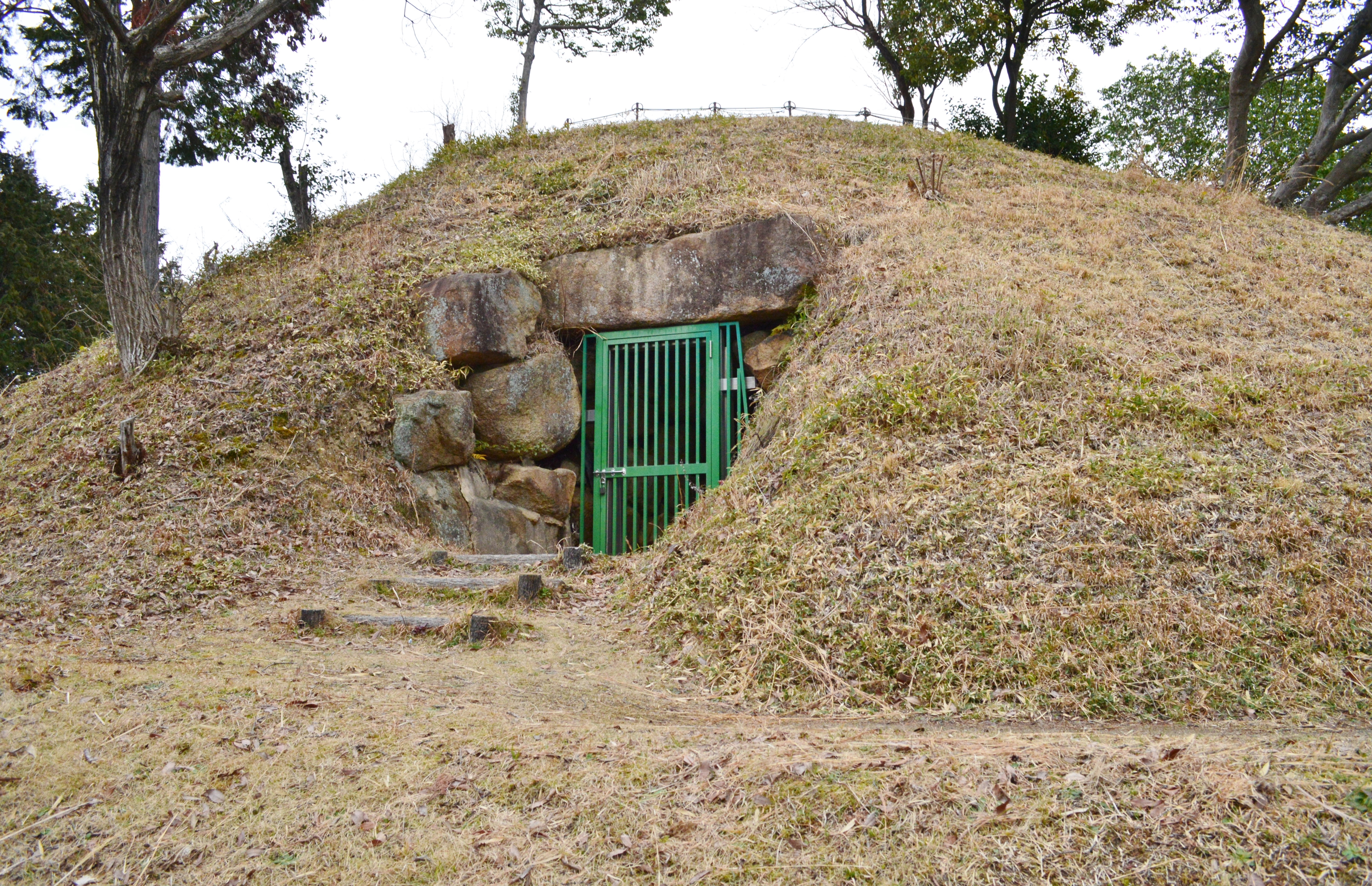
Maruyama Kofun

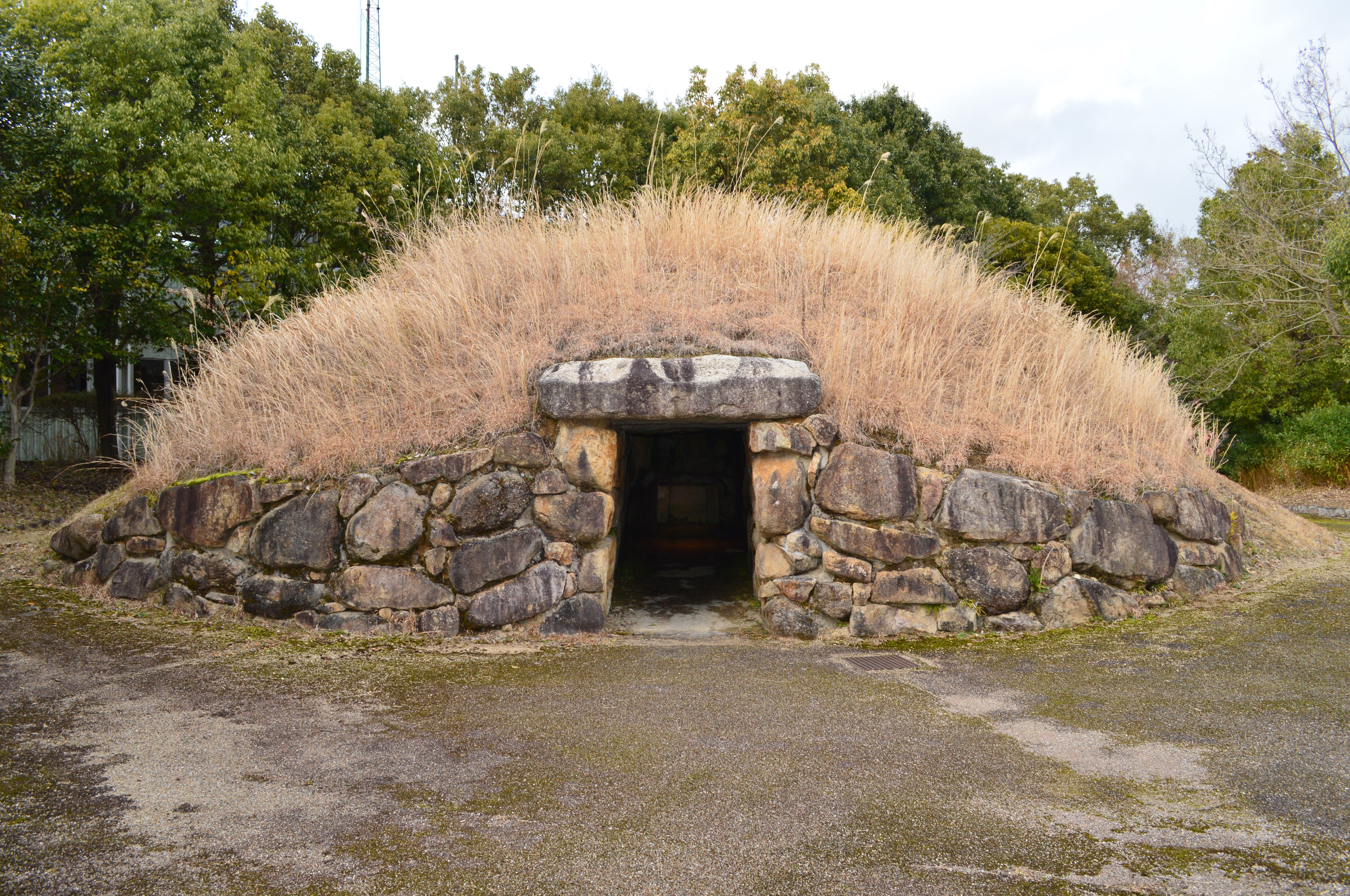
Miyayama Kofun

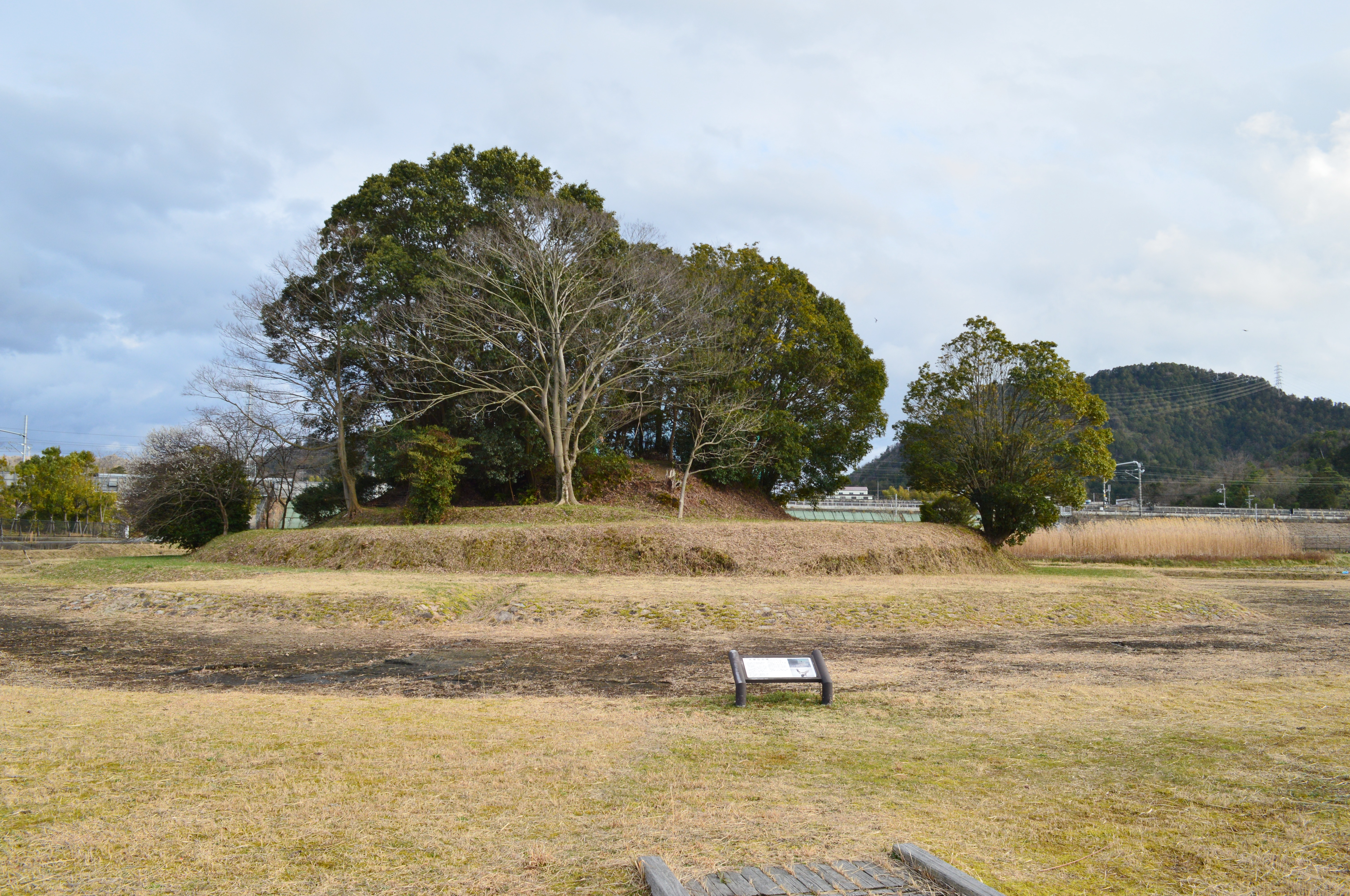
Otsukayama Kofun

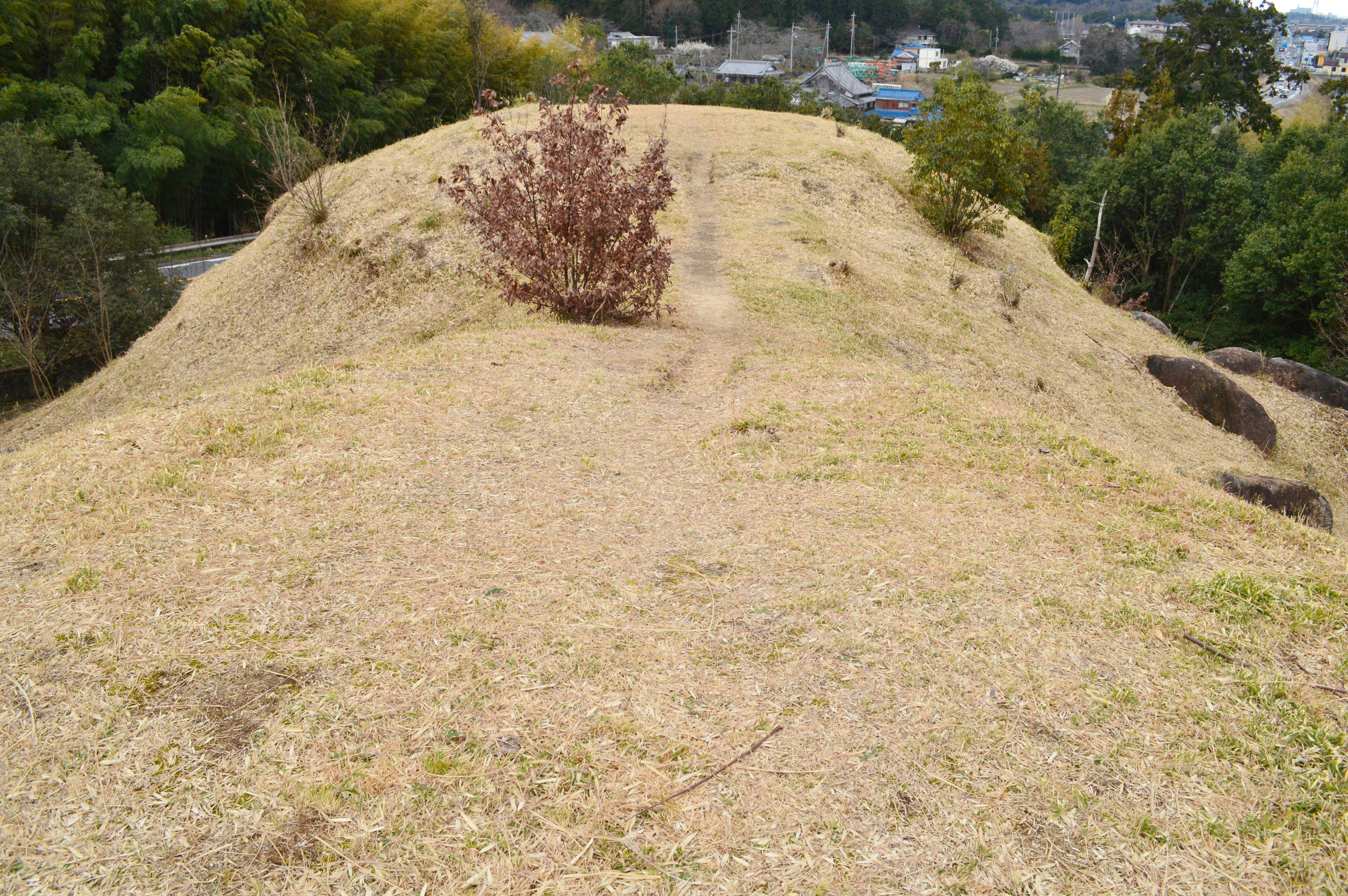
Tennoyama Kofun

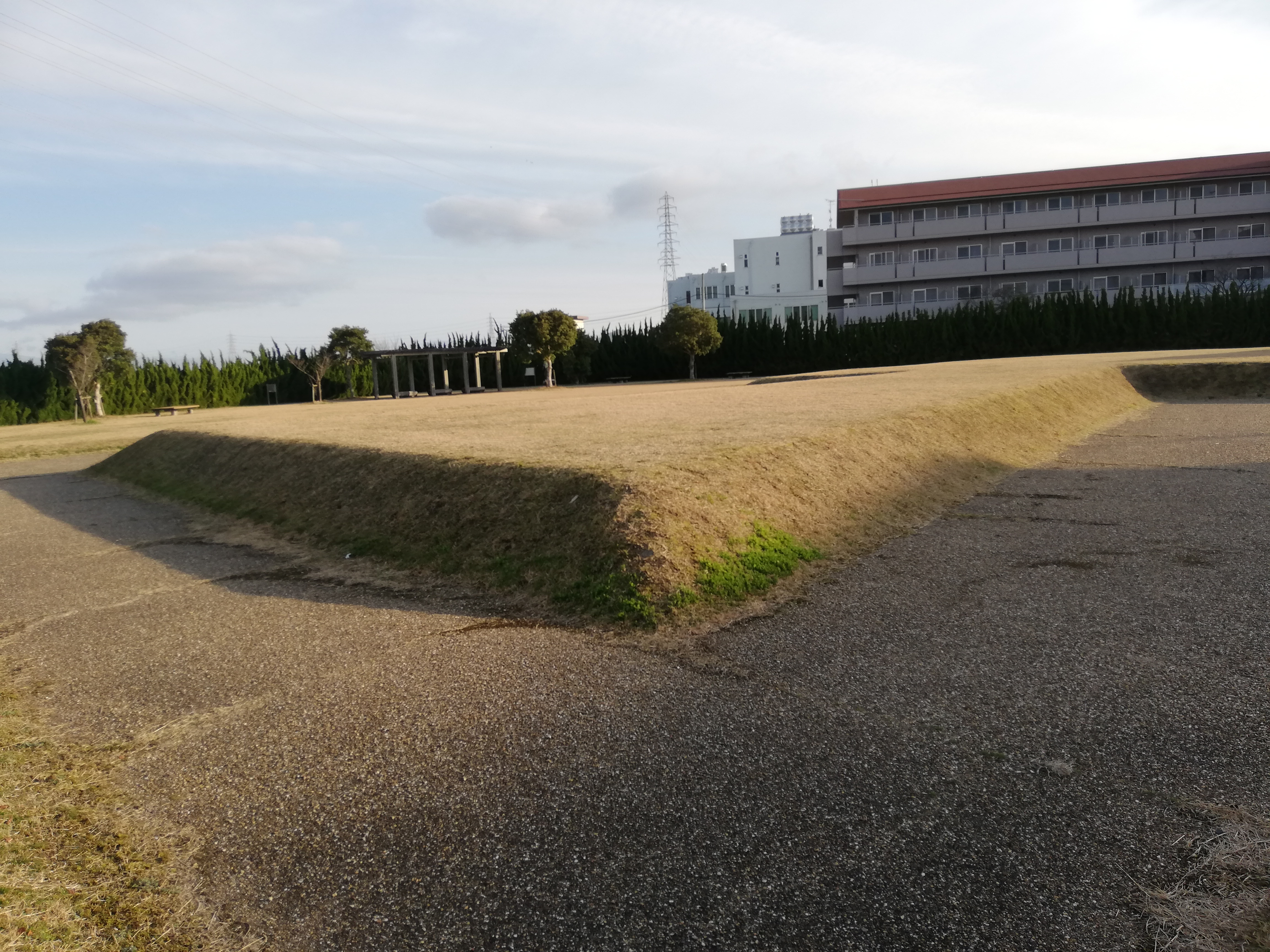
Toba Kofun

== See also ==
- List of Historic Sites of Japan (Shiga)
