= Mikami-Tanakami-Shigaraki Prefectural Natural Park =

Prefectural Natural Park in southern Shiga Prefecture, Japan

- 三上・田上・信楽県立自然公園
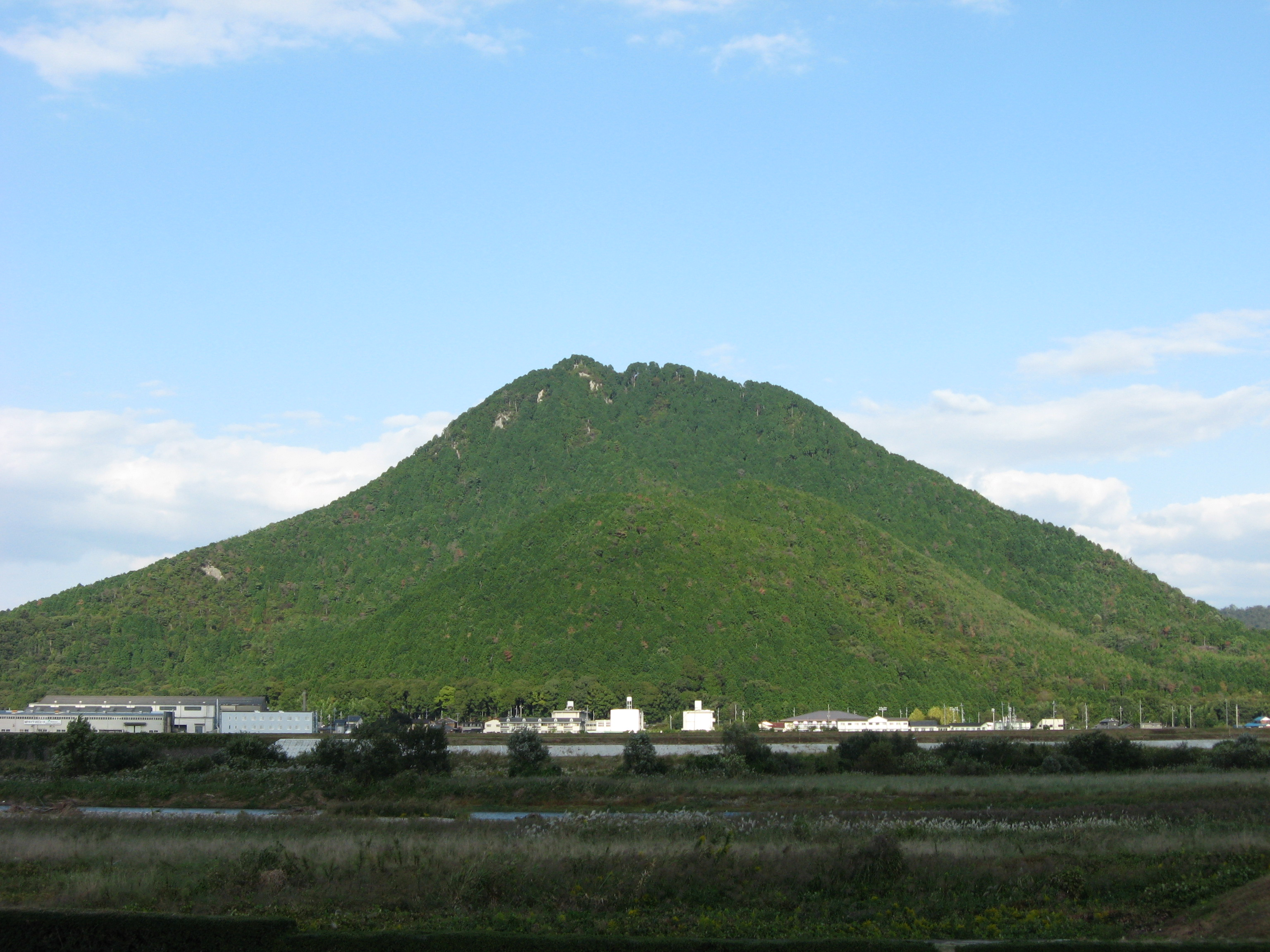
- Mount Mikami
- Interactive map of Mikami-Tanakami-Shigaraki Prefectural Natural Park
- Location: Shiga Prefecture, Japan
- Area: 181.77 km^{2} (70.18 sq mi)
- Established: 26 December 1969

Mikami-Tanakami-Shigaraki Prefectural Natural Park (三上・田上・信楽県立自然公園, Mikami-Tanakami-Shigaraki kenritsu shizen kōen) is a Prefectural Natural Park in southern Shiga Prefecture, Japan. Established in 1969, the park spans the borders of the municipalities of Higashiōmi, Kōka, Konan, Ōmihachiman, Ōtsu, Rittō, Ryūō, and Yasu; and encompasses Mount Mikami, Mount Tanakami, and the Shigaraki district.

== See also ==
- National Parks of Japan
