= Mikami Shrine =

Shinto shrine in Yasu, Shiga Prefecture, Japan

Mikami Shrine 御上神社
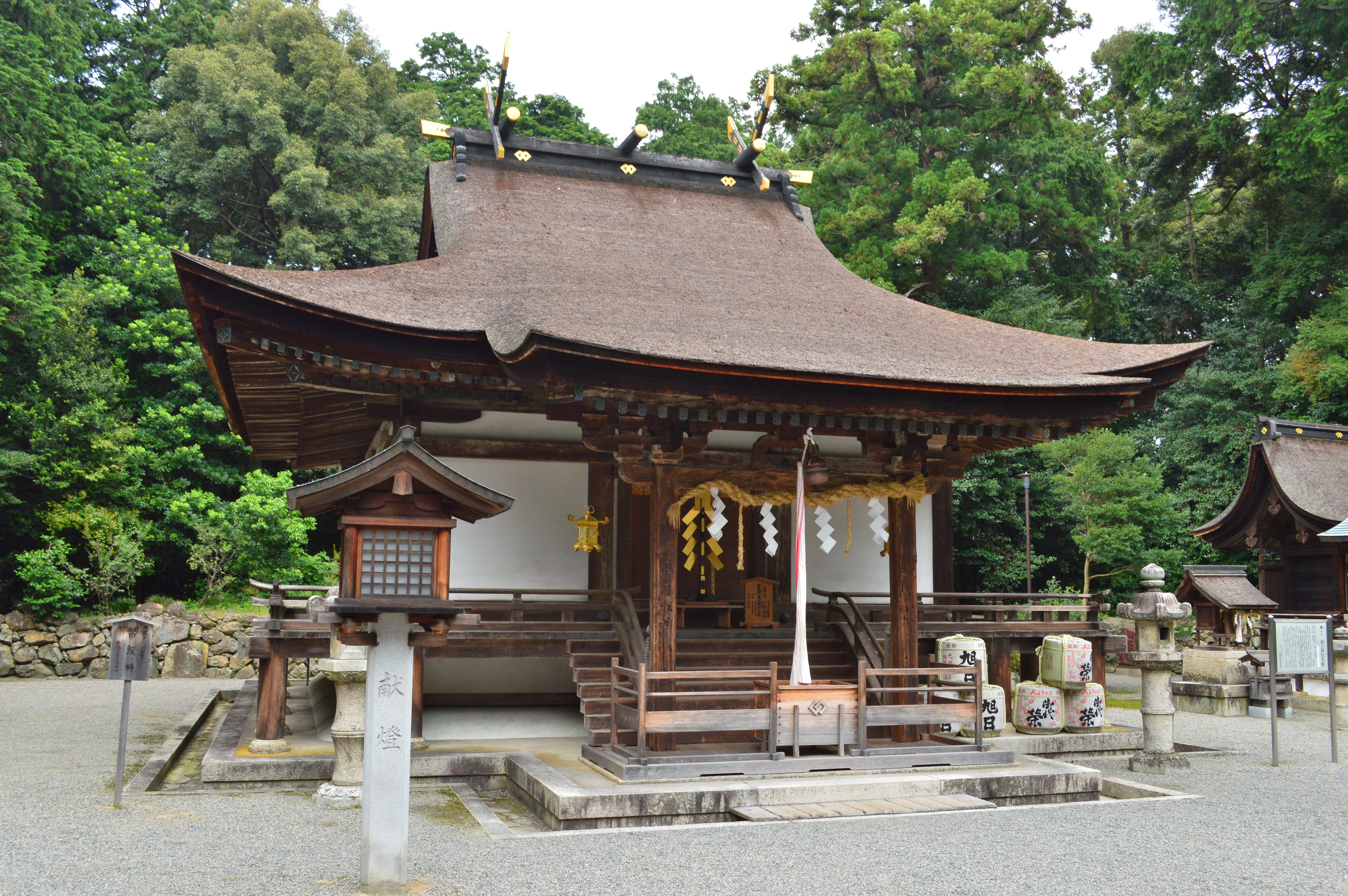
- Honden of Mikami Shrine, (NT)

- Mikami Jinja Mikami Shrine (Japan)

Religion
- Affiliation: Shinto
- Deity: Ame-no-mikage-no-mikoto

Location
- Location: Yasu, Shiga, Japan
- Interactive map of Mikami Shrine 御上神社
- Coordinates: 35.0500°N 136.0274°E

Architecture
- Founder: Fujiwara no Fuhito
- Established: c.718 AD

Website
- Official website

Mikami Shrine (御上神社, Mikami Jinja) is a Shinto shrine located in the city of Yasu, Shiga Prefecture, Japan. The kami worshipped at this shrine is Ame-no-mikage-no-mikoto, Amaterasu's grandson, who in legend, descended onto 432-meter Mount Mikami during the reign of Emperor Kōrei (290 - 215 BC) to become the shintai of the mountain.

== History ==
The foundation of Mikami Jinja is uncertain. While it is known that Fujiwara no Fuhito ordered the construction of a shrine at the current location in 718 AD, archaeological excavations have found that the area was connected with rituals pertaining to Mount Mikami from a much earlier period. In the Meiji period, 24 dōtaku were excavated at the foot of the mountain, indicating that it was worshipped from the Yayoi period.

The shrine is mentioned in several occasions in the Nihon Sandai Jitsuroku completed in 901 and is also mentioned in the Engishiki list of shrines in Ōmi Province dated 927 AD.

In 1876, following the Meiji restoration and the establishment of the Modern system of ranked Shinto shrines under State Shinto, the shrine was officially designated a "county shrine". It was promoted to the rank of "prefectural shrine" in 1913 and to Kanpei-taisha, or Imperial shrine of the 2nd rank in 1924.

Mikami Jinja is a ten-minute drive from Yasu Station on then JR West Biwako Line.

== Cultural Properties ==
Honden (本殿)
The shrine's main building is estimated to have been built in the latter half of the Kamakura Period from its various stylistic details. If fuses Shinto shrine architecture with Buddhist elements such as Irimoya-zukuri, style roof, plaster walls, and "Renko" windows. It was declared a protected building as early as 1899, but was formally designated as a National Treasure in 1952.

Haiden (拝殿)
Dating from then later Kamukura period, it was designated as an Important Cultural Property (ICP) in 1899.

Rōmon (楼門)
Dating from the late Kamakura period, it was designated as an ICP in 1899

Wakamiya Jinja Honden (摂社若宮神社本殿)
Belonging to a subsidiary shrine within the same compound, this structure dates from the late Muromachi period. It is designated as an ICP in 1931

== Festivals ==
The "Zuiki Festival of Mikami", celebrated every October as a harvesting festival, is an Important Intangible Folk Cultural Property. The rice for Emperor Showa's first Niiname Festival in 1925 was grown in a paddy field nearby, which is celebrated every year in June by a rice planting ceremony.

== Gallery ==
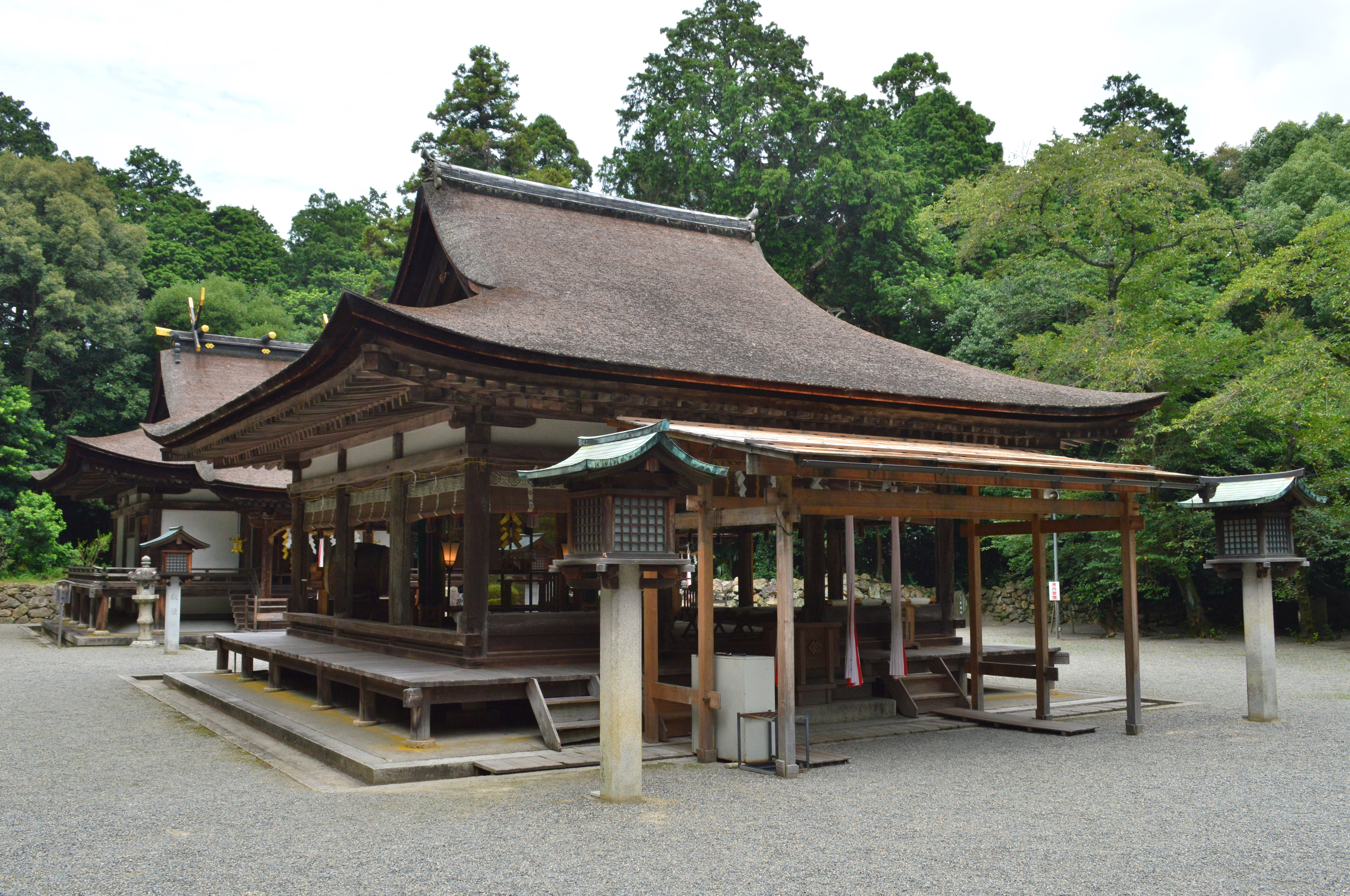
Haiden, ICP

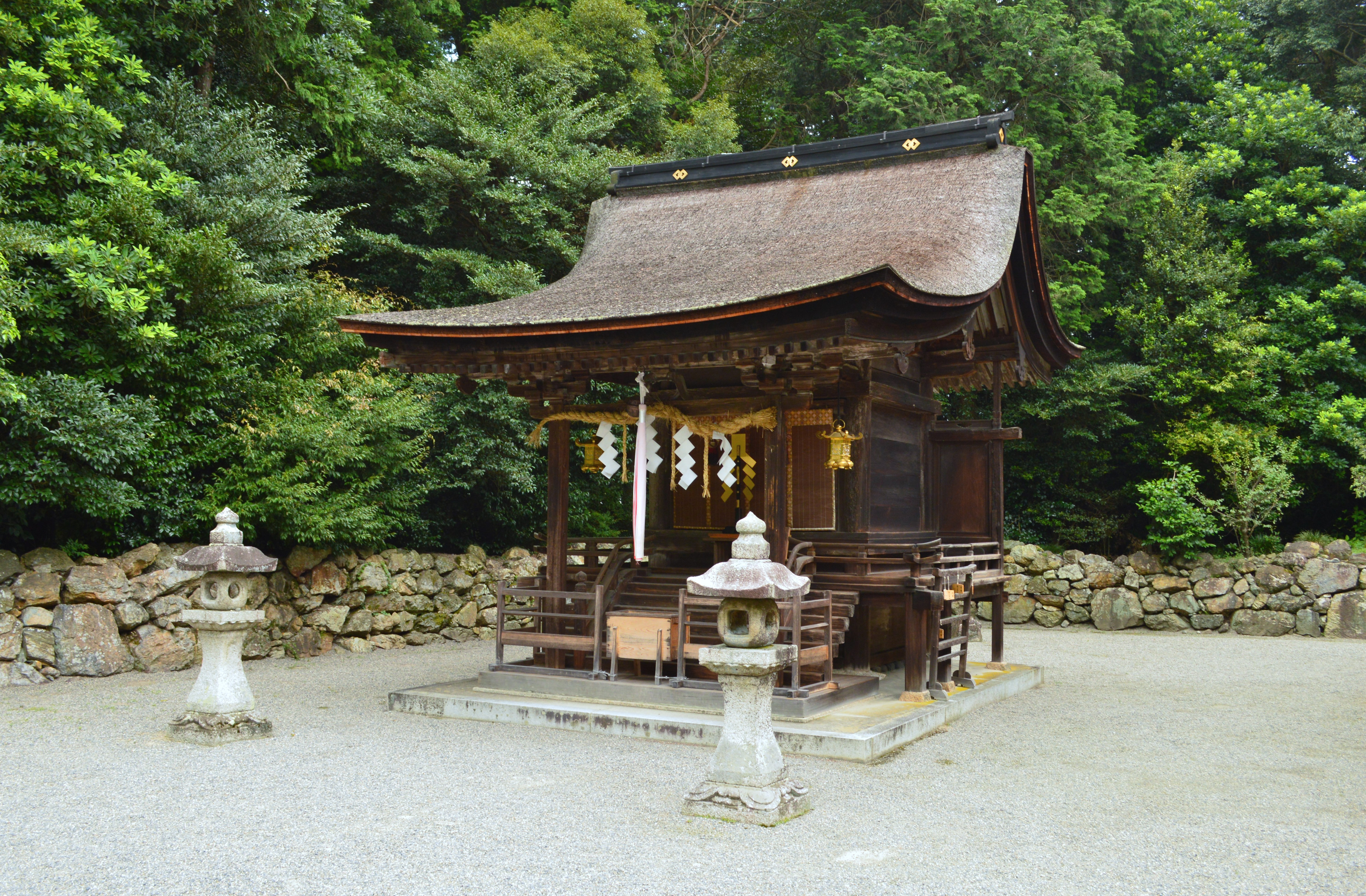
Wakamiya Jinja, ICP

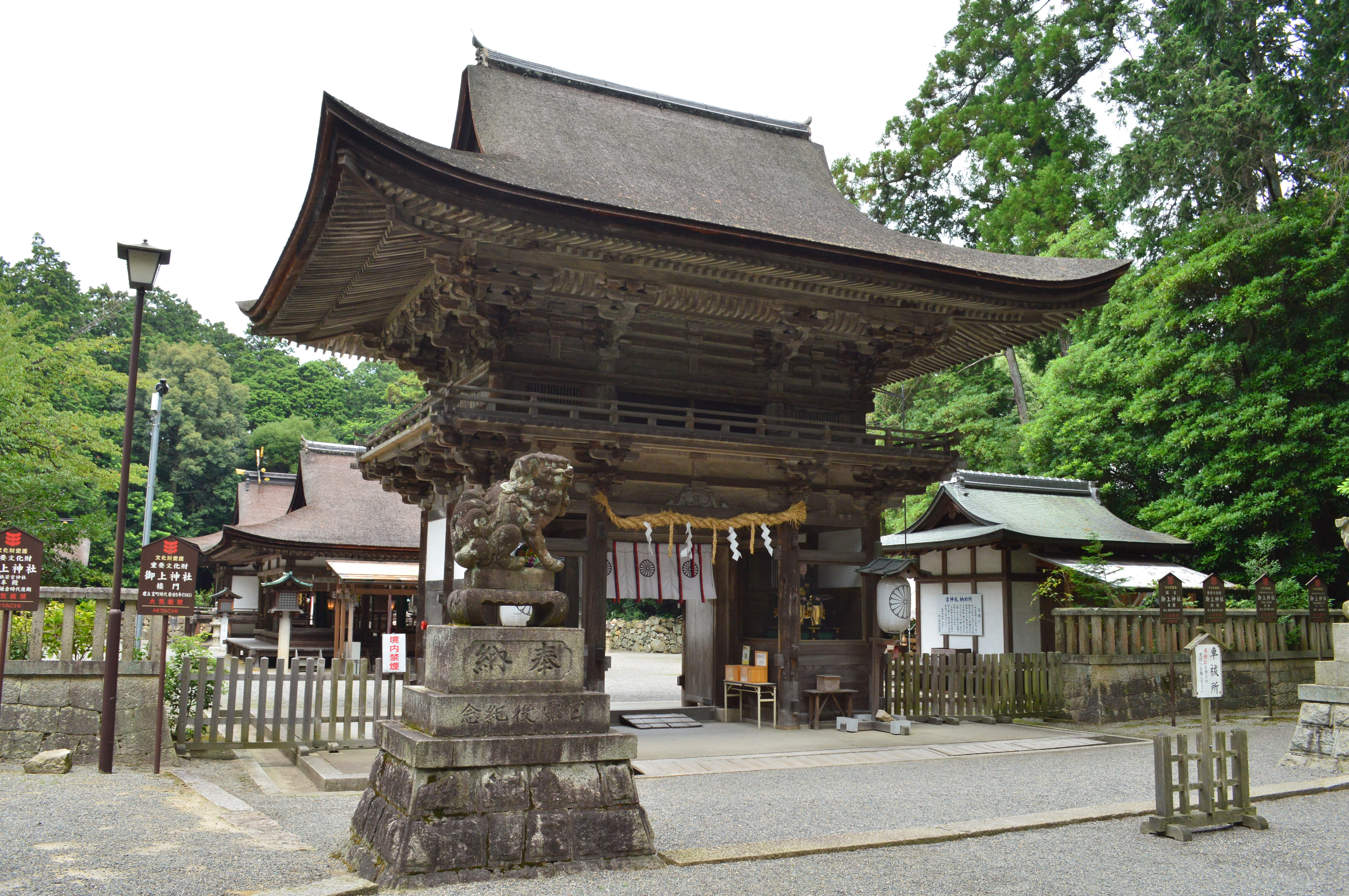
Rōmon, ICP

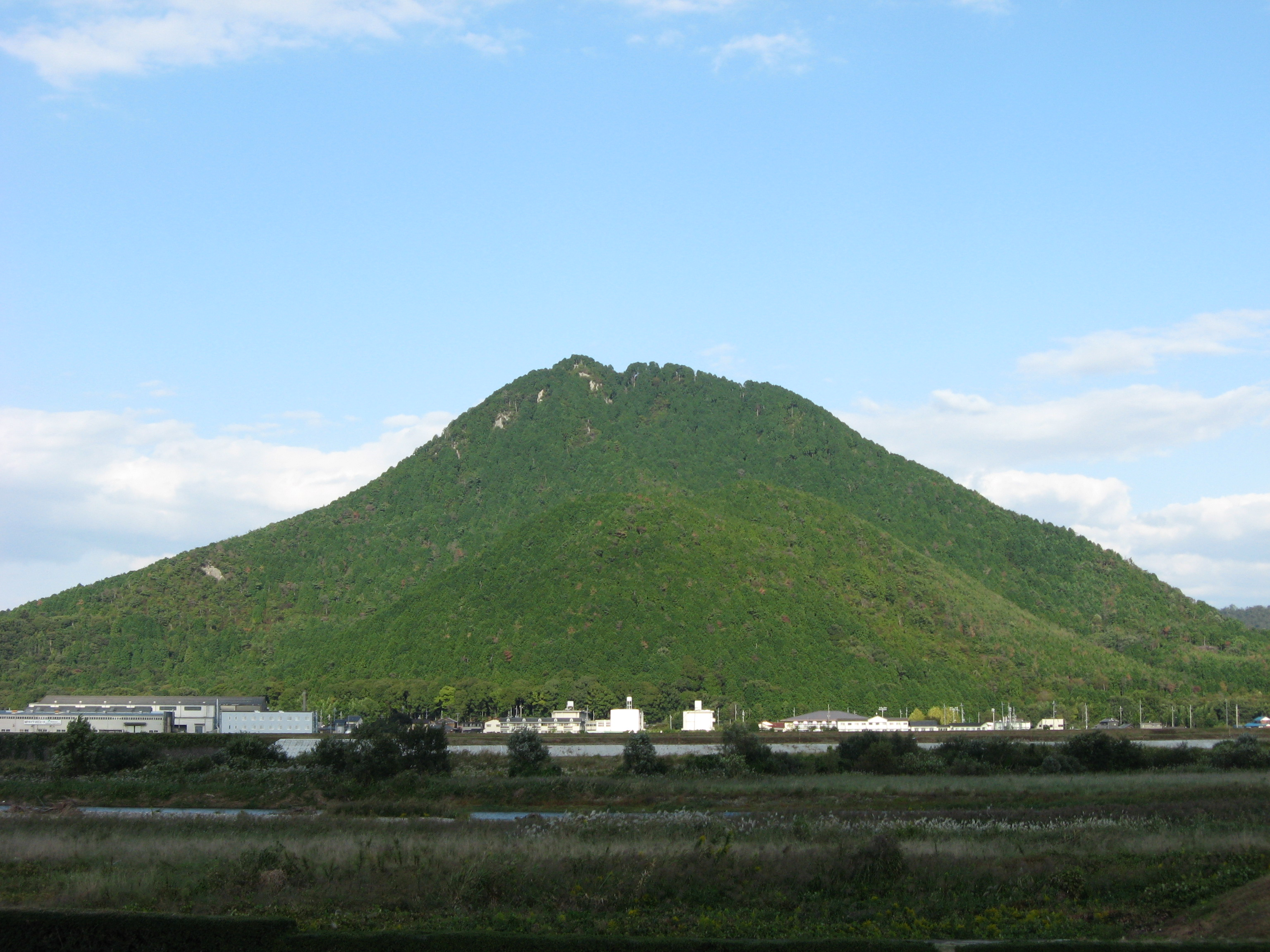
Mount Mikami, as the shrine's shintai

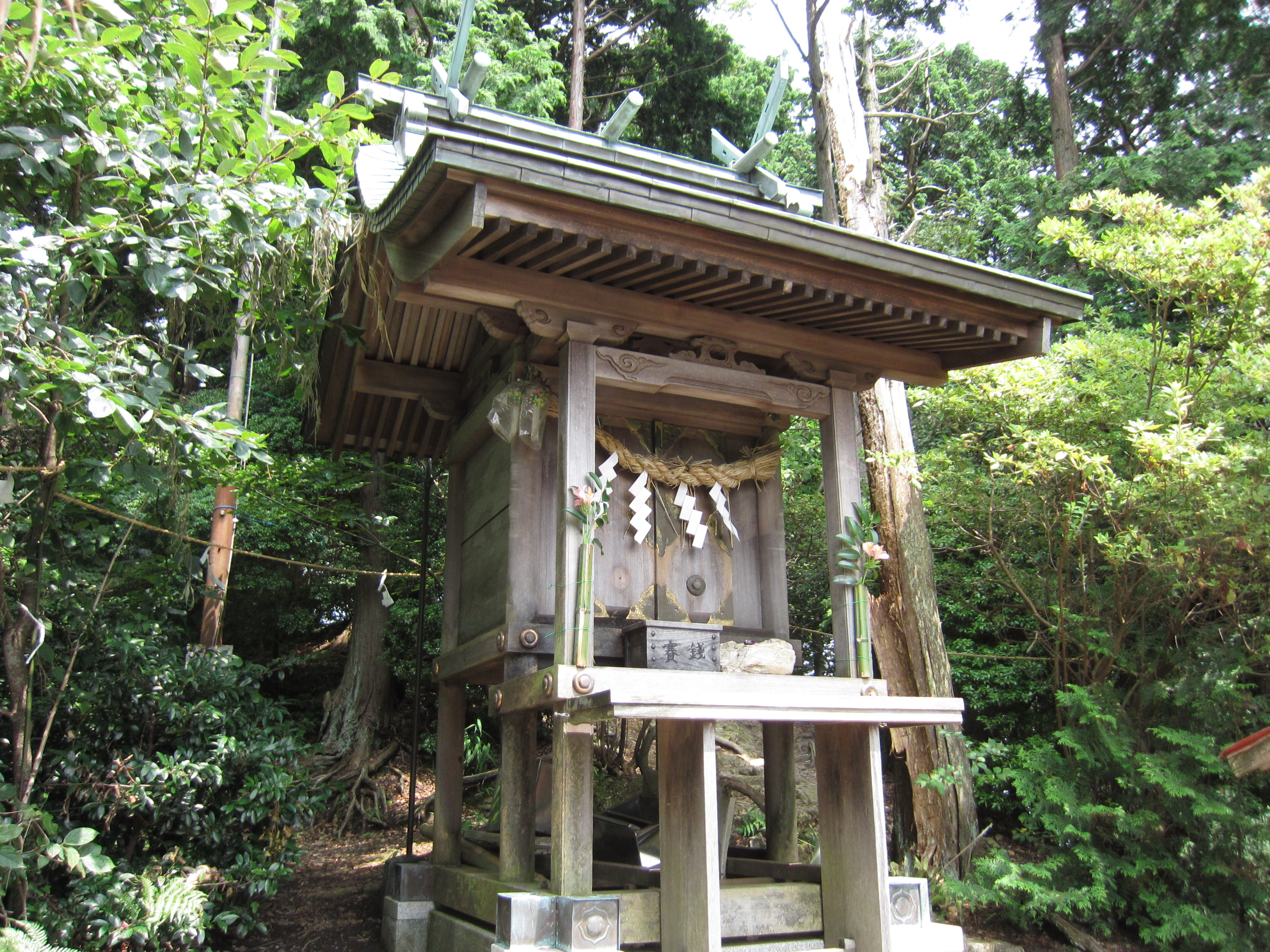
The Outer Shrine on top of Mount Mikami

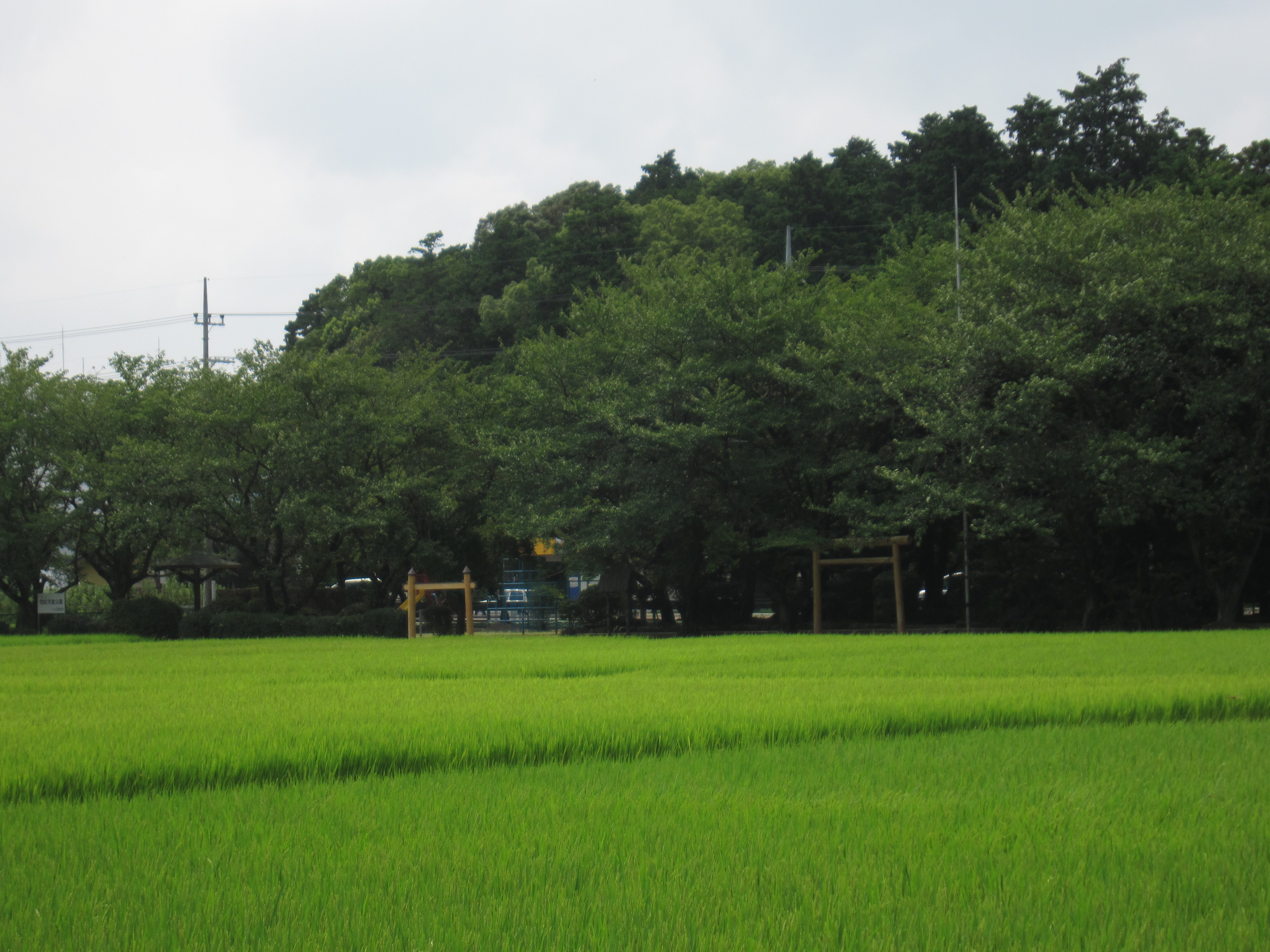
The rice for Emperor Showa was grown here.

== See also ==
- List of National Treasures of Japan (shrines)
- Mount Mikami
