= Ōsasahara Shrine =

Shinto shrine in Shiga Prefecture, Japan

Ōsasahara Shrine 大笹原神社
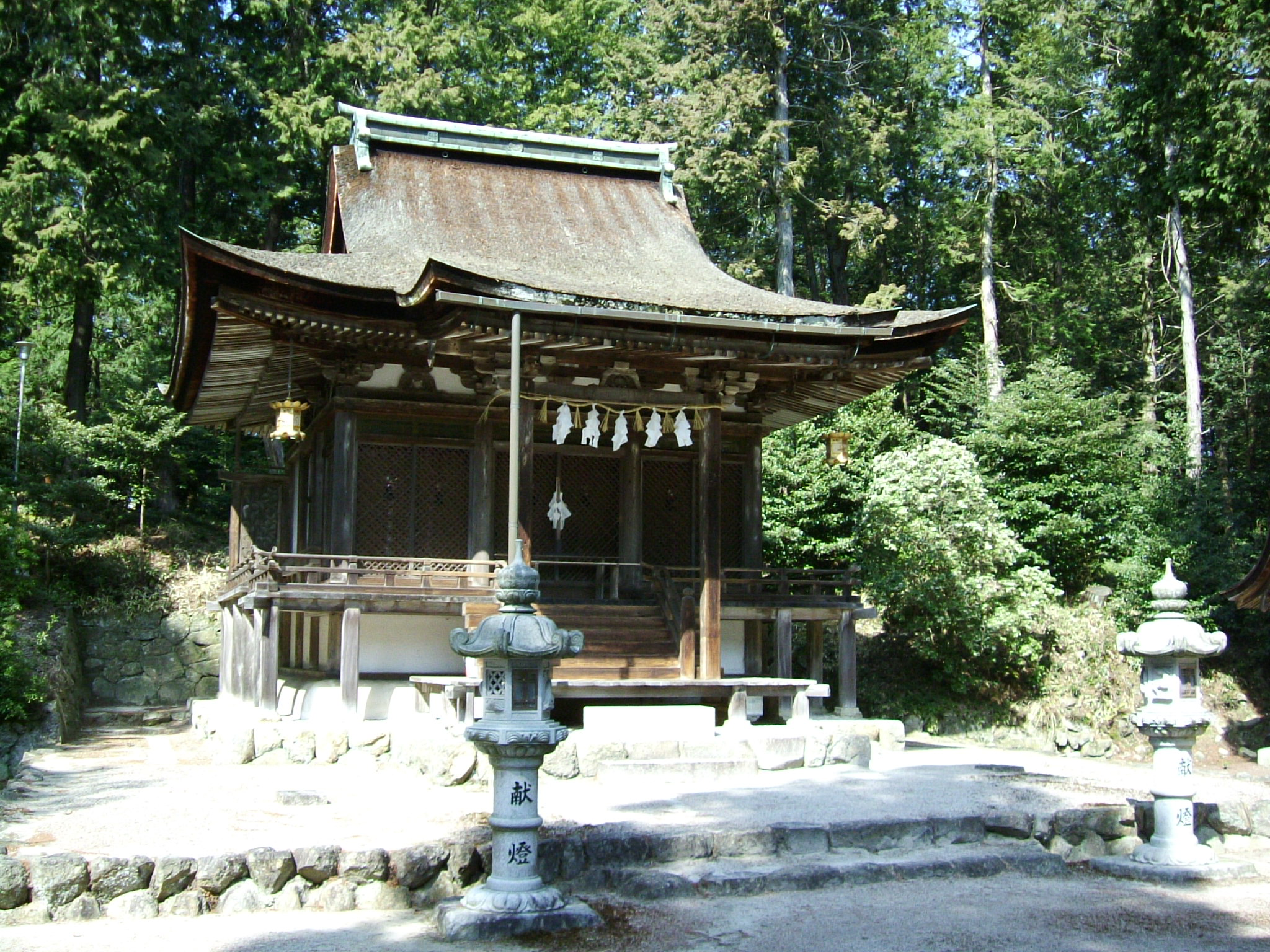
- The Main Building of Ōsasahara Shrine, a National Treasure

- Ōsasahara Jinja Ōsasahara Shrine (Japan)

Religion
- Affiliation: Shinto
- Deity: Susanoo-no-Mikoto, Kushinadahime

Location
- Location: Ōsasahara, Yasu, Shiga, Japan
- Coordinates: 35°4′35.43″N 136°3′57.06″E

Architecture
- Established: 986 AD

Ōsasahara Shrine (大笹原神社, Ōsasahara Jinja) is a Shinto shrine located in the city of Yasu, Shiga Prefecture, Japan. The kami worshipped at this shrine are Susanoo-no-Mikoto and Kushinadahime.

== Outline ==
Ōsasahara Shrine was constructed in the year 986 by Echi Morozane, a local warlord. In 1414, the shrine's main hall (honden) was reconstructed by Mabuchi Sadanobu, the castellan of Iwakura Castle. Following the Meiji restoration and the establishment of the Modern system of ranked Shinto shrines under State Shinto, the shrine was officially designated a "county shrine".

== Cultural properties ==
Honden
Reconstructed in 1414 during the middle Muromachi period, this building is a 3×3 ken, single-storied structure with an irimoya-zukuri style (Note: (irimoya-zukuri, 入母屋造): a hip-and-gable roof combining a ridge and two gable pediments on the upper part with a hipped roof on all sides in the lower part of the roof.) roof and a 1 ken step canopy covered by hinoki cypress bark shingles. It is particularly notable for the excellent construction technique of the transom and doors. The ornamental carvings are representative of Higashiyama culture. The building was designated as National Treasure in 1961.

Shinohara Shrine Honden
Located to the left of the main shrine is a subsidiary shrine dedicated to Ishikori-dome no Mikoto. Built in 1425, it was designated an Important Cultural Property in 1931.

== See also ==
- List of Shinto shrines
- List of National Treasures of Japan (shrines)
