= Teiichiro Fujita =

Japanese economist (1935-2015)

- 藤田貞一郎
- Born: February 11, 1935; Pyongyang, Korea, Empire of Japan
- Died: June 13, 2015 (aged 80); Yasu, Shiga
- Resting place: Yokohama

Academic background
- Education: Osaka University

Academic work
- Discipline: Economic history
- Institutions: Matsuyama University; Doshisha University

Teiichiro Fujita (藤田貞一郎, Fujita Teiichiro) (February 11, 1935 – June 13, 2015) was a Japanese economist and economic historian, emeritus professor at Doshisha University, author of books on Japanese economic history and the history of Japanese economic thought.

He was born in Pyongyang, Korea, Empire of Japan to Fusasuke Fujita and Sei Fujita née Asaoka. He graduated from Osaka University and in 1967 received his PhD in economics from Osaka University for his research on "Early Modern Economic Thought: The Shogunate System and the Idea of National Interest". He was a lecturer at Matsuyama University, and later became professor at Doshisha University. He published several monographs and articles on the Japanese economic history and the history of Japanese economic thought from early modern (Edo period) until modern (Meiji and Taishō) eras. His research focused on the development of the notion of national economic interest (Kokueki in Japanese) that played a central role in creating the modern nation-state of Japan and the modern political economy of the country. He published also on the history of guilds (Dôgyou kumiai in Japanese) and the market history of fresh foods in modern Japan.

== Selected publications ==
- "Study of Early Modern Economic Thought: The Idea of National Interest and the Bakuhan System", Yoshikawa Kobunkan, 1966 (written in Japanese)
- "50 Years of the Kyoto City Public Retail Market: Public Retail Markets and Japanese Capitalism" edited by the Consumer Economics Division of the Kyoto City Economic Bureau, Kyoto City Public Retail Market Association, 1969 (written in Japanese)
- "Historical Study of Modern Fresh Food Markets: Central Wholesale Markets", Seibundo Publishing, 1972 (written in Japanese)
- “History of Modern Japanese Trade Unions”, Seibundo Publishing, 1995 (written in Japanese)
- "The Genealogy and Development of National Interest Thought: From the Tokugawa Period to the Meiji Period", Seibundo Publishing, 1998 (written in Japanese)
- "A New Perspective on the Study of Modern Japanese Economic History: National Interests, Markets, Trade Associations, and Robinson Crusoe ", Seibundo Publishing, 2003 (written in Japanese)
- "Rethinking the Exegesis of the Concept of Territorial Reform", Seibundo Publishing, 2011 (written in Japanese)
- "History of Japanese Commerce" by Mataro Miyamoto and Akira Hasegawa, Yuhikaku Shinsho, 1978 (co-author) (written in Japanese)
- Miyamoto Mataji Historical Museum" edited by Masatomo Uda, Shibunkaku Publishing, 1984 (co-author) (written in Japanese)
- "History of Markets and Management: From Early Modern to Modern Times" co-edited by Seiichi Ando, Seibundo Publishing, 1996 (co-author) (written in Japanese)
- "The Origins and Development of Kokueki Thought in Japan", [in:] "Village Communities, States, and Traders - Essays in honour of Chatthip Nartsupha", ed. by A. Nozaki and C. Baker, Bangkok, Sangsan Publishing House, 2003 (written in English)

== Private life ==
He composed classic Japanese poems with thirty-one syllables (Waka (poetry)). He was married and had two children.
