= Mount Mikami =

Mountain in Yasu, Shiga prefecture, Japan

Coordinates: 35.0503°N 136.0378°E

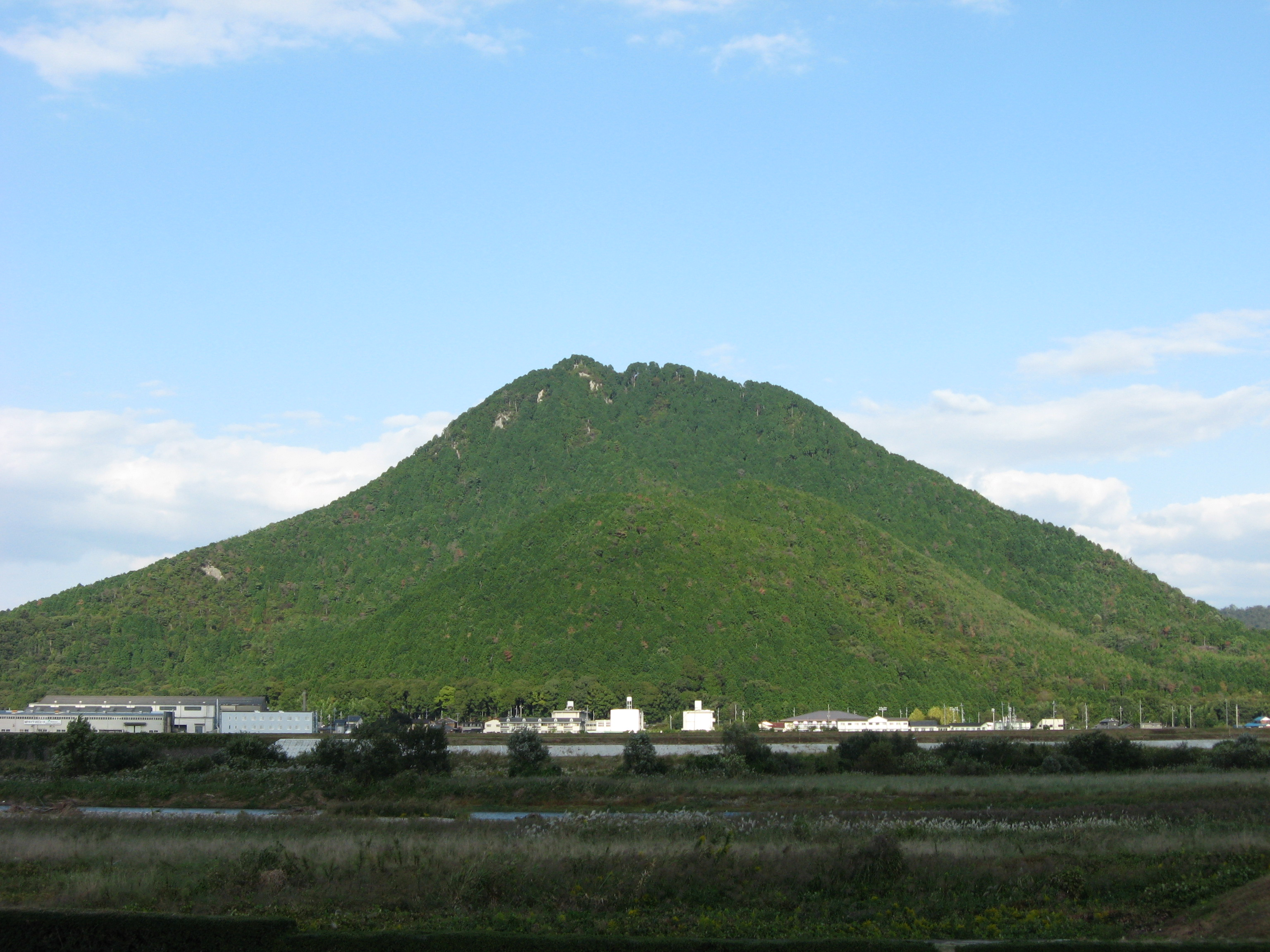
Mount Mikami, Shiga Prefecture

Mount Mikami (Japanese: 三上山, pronounced "Mikami Yama", meaning Mikami Mountain) is a mountain, 432 metres (1,417 ft) above sea level, located in Yasu City, Shiga Prefecture, Japan. In spite of its relatively low altitude, it is also called "Ōmi Fuji", that is Mount Fuji of Ōmi Province, the old name of Shiga Prefecture, because of its conical shape standing out in the flat area on the shores of Lake Biwa.

It is now part of Mikami-Tanakami-Shigaraki Prefectural Natural Park, established in 1969. Both Mount Ibuki, Shiga Prefecture's highest peak, and Mount Mikami can be spotted easily from the windows of the Tokyo-Kyoto/Osaka Shinkansen train, as it passes through the prefecture.

Mount Mikami, nearer to Kyoto, the traditional capital of Japan, has appeared in the Japanese literature from the ancient times. It is particularly noted for the legend of "Fujiwara no Hidesato Conquering the Giant Centipede of Mount Mikami".

At the foot of Mount Mikami is the Shintoist Mikami Shrine (Japanese: 御神神社, pronounced "Mikami Jinja", meaning the Gods' Shrine), a Kanpei-chūsha.
