= Dōtaku =

Japanese bronze bells

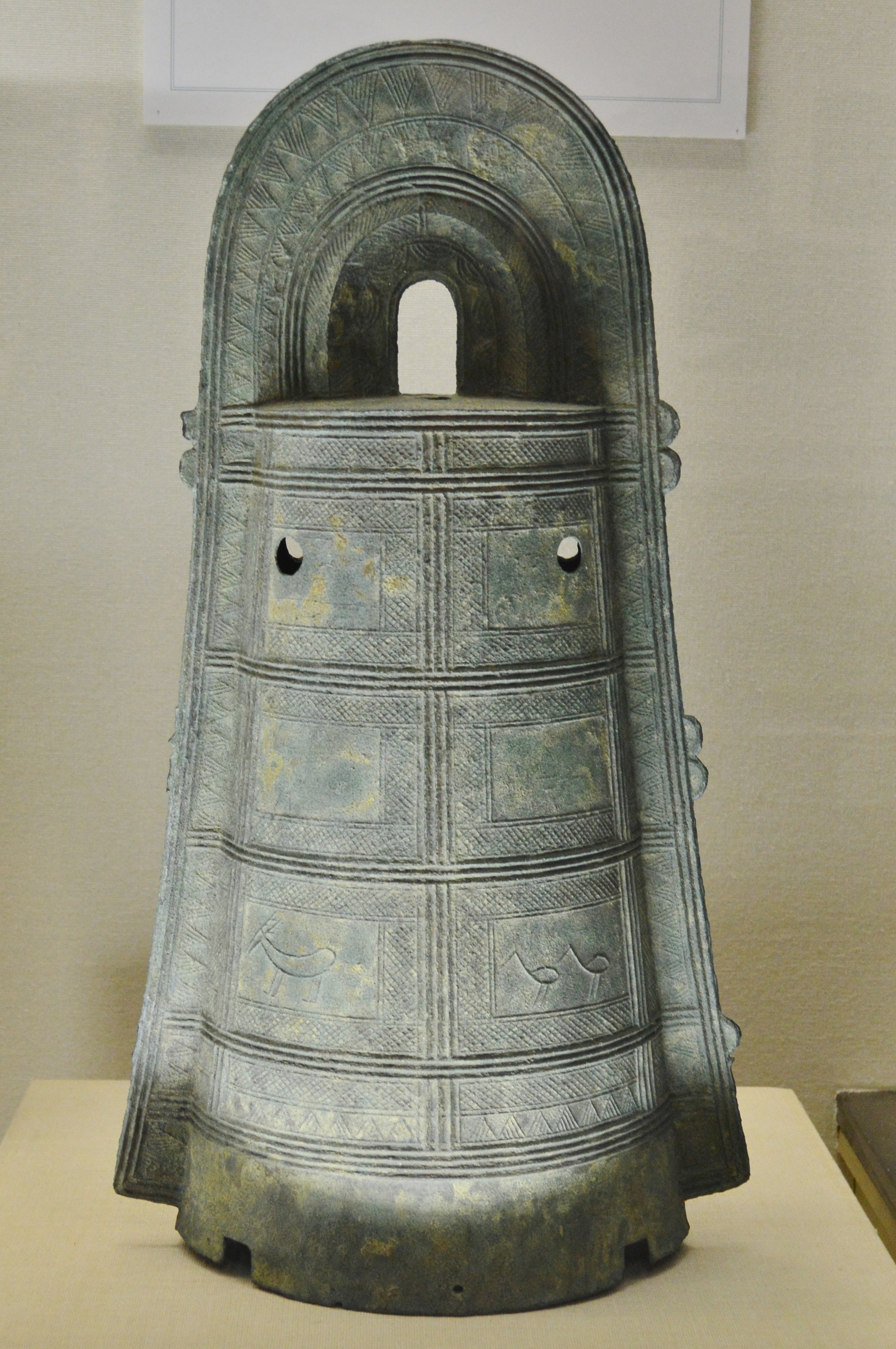
A Yayoi period dōtaku, 3rd century

Dōtaku (銅鐸) are richly decorated Japanese bells cast in bronze. They were used for about 400 years, between the second century BCE and the second century CE (corresponding to the end of the Yayoi period), and were used almost exclusively as decorations during rituals. They were richly decorated with patterns representing nature and animals, among which the dragonfly, praying mantis and spider are featured. Historians believe that dōtaku were used to pray for good harvests, as the animals featured are natural enemies of insect pests that attack paddy fields.

The Yasu City History and Folklore Museum in Yasu, Shiga Prefecture, Japan (nicknamed the "dōtaku museum") has a permanent exhibition devoted to the bells.

== History ==
During the Yayoi Era (1000 BCE – 300 CE), a great number of technological innovations occurred. Unlike the earlier nomadic Jōmon people, the Yayoi inhabited large community settlements and engaged in the cultivation of rice. Likewise, newly learnt metallurgical techniques afforded them the ability to cast metal objects in bronze and iron such as weapons, mirrors, and various tools, etc. Among their bronze creations, dōtaku, one of the most distinctive objects of the era, were created. In recent years, dōtaku have been studied by researchers in order to decipher their origins, how they were created, their various purposes, and the reasons or meaning behind the images on the main body.

== Origin ==
Despite being a well-known artifact of the Yayoi era, the concept of dōtaku did not initially originate in Japan. According to several studies, these bells are thought to be derived from "earlier, smaller Korean examples that adorned horses and other domesticated animals", from Chinese cattle bells, or Han Chinese zhong, which were bells without clappers used for composing ritual music. However, further studies show that the Yayoi did not have cattle farms, and although several dōtaku do have suspension rings and clappers, they make "muffled tones" or "rattling sounds" when struck, suggesting that they were not meant to be rung. Therefore, any bells from China were imported as ritual objects.

=== Locations ===
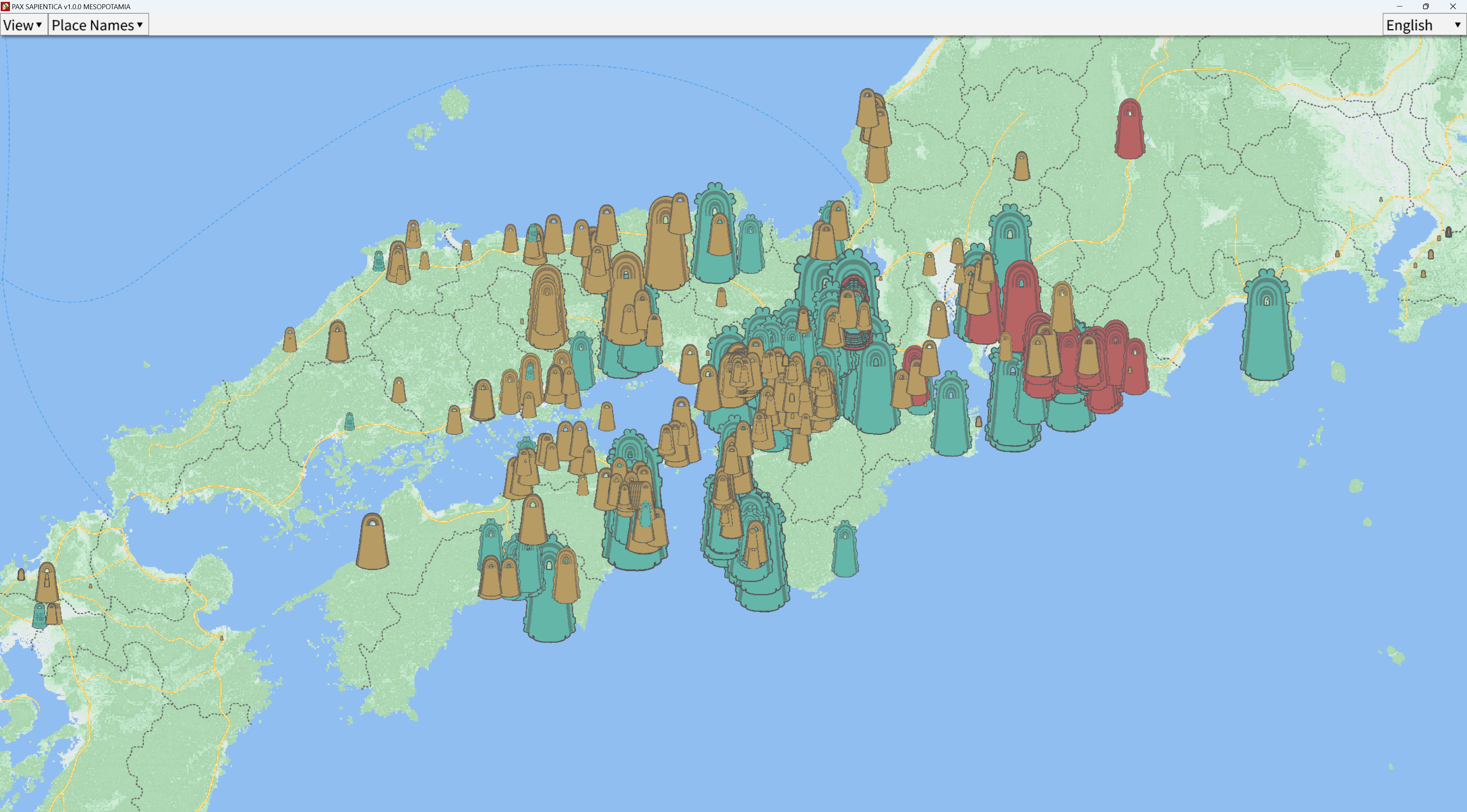
Distribution of Dōtaku

In total, over four hundred dōtaku have been found in Japan, mainly in western Honshu, the Tokai District, Shikoku, and the Kansai region, namely Kyoto, Nara, and Osaka. The "first recorded discovery of dōtaku" was in 662 CE at a temple located in Shiga Prefecture. They are often "found buried on isolated hillsides" either ‘singly, [in] pairs, or in large groups" along with various bronze mirrors and weapons. When buried in groups, researchers have speculated that several clans each buried their only dotaku in one area to signify the unity of all the clans.

== Appearance ==
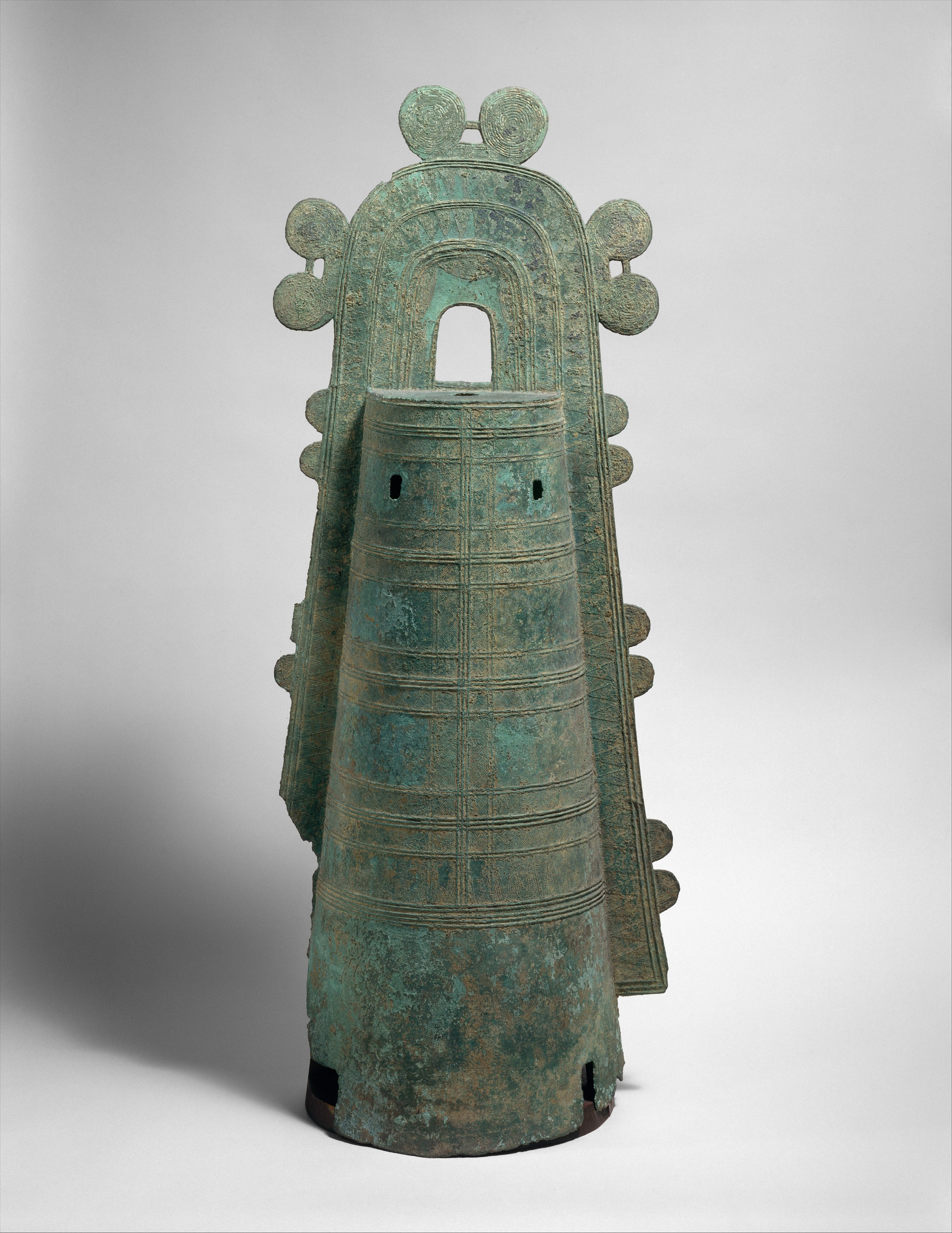
Dōtaku (bell-shaped; bronze), Yayoi period, 1st-2nd century A.D.

Physically, the body of a dōtaku consists of "a truncated cone shape" with an oval cross-section and "has rows of horizontal bands divided in the center by a vertical row". Arching and extending over the top and the sides of the body is an "elaborate flange filled with sawtooth design and projecting spirals". The materials used for dōtaku came from both Korea and China since "bronze resources were not found until the 7th century", thus bronze was considered more precious than iron. In addition, researchers have detected lead traces inside the bells, which was a common characteristic of Chinese metals. These Yayoi bells vary in height ranging from 4 inches to 50 inches, approximately 10 cm to 127 cm. In conjunction with the varying height, the styles of the bells also varied greatly. Across several regions, this scattered production continued until a group of bronze-smiths congregated and decided on a standard.

=== Evolving Casting Methods ===
These bells were originally made through the use of two-part sandstone moulds, in which "designs were carved" in order to create the appearance of raised bronzes on the outer surface. Many of these sandstone moulds were "found in abundance in northern Kyushu" and near Kyoto, Osaka, and Nara. As time progressed, dōtaku gradually became larger in size and thinner because they began to be made using clay moulds instead of sandstone. This allowed for more detailed work, such as simple line drawings, compared to the smaller and thicker sandstone moulds.

== Main purpose ==
Other purposes of the dōtaku are still being debated by researchers, but it is certain that they were used for agricultural rituals and rites, as supported by various sources. Researchers suggest that, when not in use, dōtaku were buried "in the ground to receive Earth’s life force", thus ensuring agricultural fertility for the community; they were also believed to have been used to pray for rain. These beliefs and suggestions are supported by the fact that many dōtaku had inscriptions of "flowing water, waterfowl, fish, boats, and agricultural objects" on them. Although it is unknown whether or not dōtaku were "used by the chieftains for small principalities or by villages in public community festivals", it is certain that they belonged to the community as a whole rather than an individual. Some alternate theories include dōtaku being used as "a sundial, producing gold, heating water for bathing, or related to secret Jewish practices", although these explanations have little support within the mainstream archaeological community.

== Similarities with Chinese imagery ==
Decorations on dōtaku contain many aspects that resemble Chinese objects. For example, many early bells had "delicate decorations [that] resemble contemporary Chinese mirrors". It wasn’t until later in the Yayoi era that decorations "with scenes of animals and humans hunting or farming" were used. Along with these depictions, there are also images of the typical Yayoi "elevated granaries and scenes of rice being pounded".

=== Deer ===
Many depictions of deer appear on dōtaku the most, even though the "Yayoi ate mostly wild boar". According to "Harima Fudoki", which is a series of reports comprised in the Nara period (710 C.E. – 793 C.E.), there was "a magical ritual of sowing seeds in deer blood that was used to speed up the germination of rice plants" because it was believed that "the deer’s life force helped the growth of rice."

== Research ==
There have also been studies as to whether or not the images on the dōtaku have significant meanings. According to a researcher named Oba, each picture contains a hidden pictograph that can be deciphered through a phonetic reading. For example, a picture of a man shooting a deer can be read as "iru ka" (to shoot a deer), but when combined to form "Iruka", the pictures refer to Soga no Iruka, which is a reference to the Soga Dynasty. Through several more readings, Oba discovered that the drawings "contain references to precise persons, places, and events in Japanese prehistory" as well as provided "info of shapes of buildings, hunting customs, and other aspects of daily life", possibly left for future generations. However, due to a lack of concrete evidence, other researchers have deemed it improbable that the pictures are actually hidden pictographs; it is possible that the pictures are just pictures. Despite the lack of evidence, researchers do believe that the pictures aren’t just casual pictures drawn for the sake of art, that there is some other meaning behind them.

== See also ==
- Bonshō
- Bronze-casting
- Jōmon Era
- Mirrors in Shinto
