= Yasu, Shiga =

Yasu 野洲市
- City
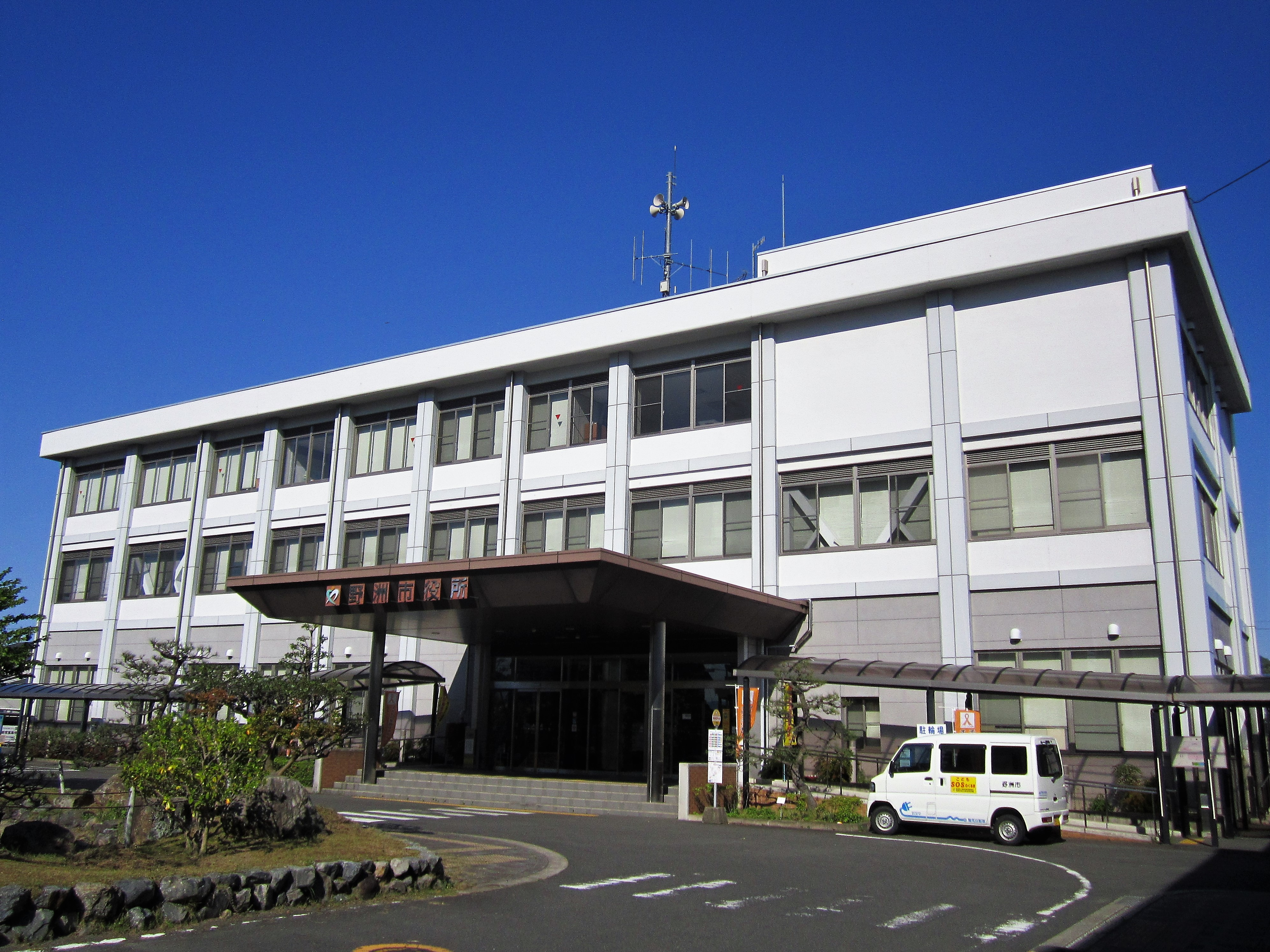
- Yasu City Hall

- Flag Seal

- Location of Yasu in Shiga Prefecture

- Location in Japan
- Coordinates: 35°4′N 136°2′E
- Country: Japan
- Region: Kansai
- Prefecture: Shiga

Government
  - Mayor: Yoshiaki Yamanaka

Area
  - Total: 80.15 km^{2} (30.95 sq mi)

Population (October 1, 2021)
  - Total: 50,695
  - Density: 632.5/km^{2} (1,638/sq mi)
- Time zone: UTC+09:00 (JST)
- City hall address: 2100-1, Koshinohara, Yasu-shi, Shiga-ken; 520-2395
- Website: Official website

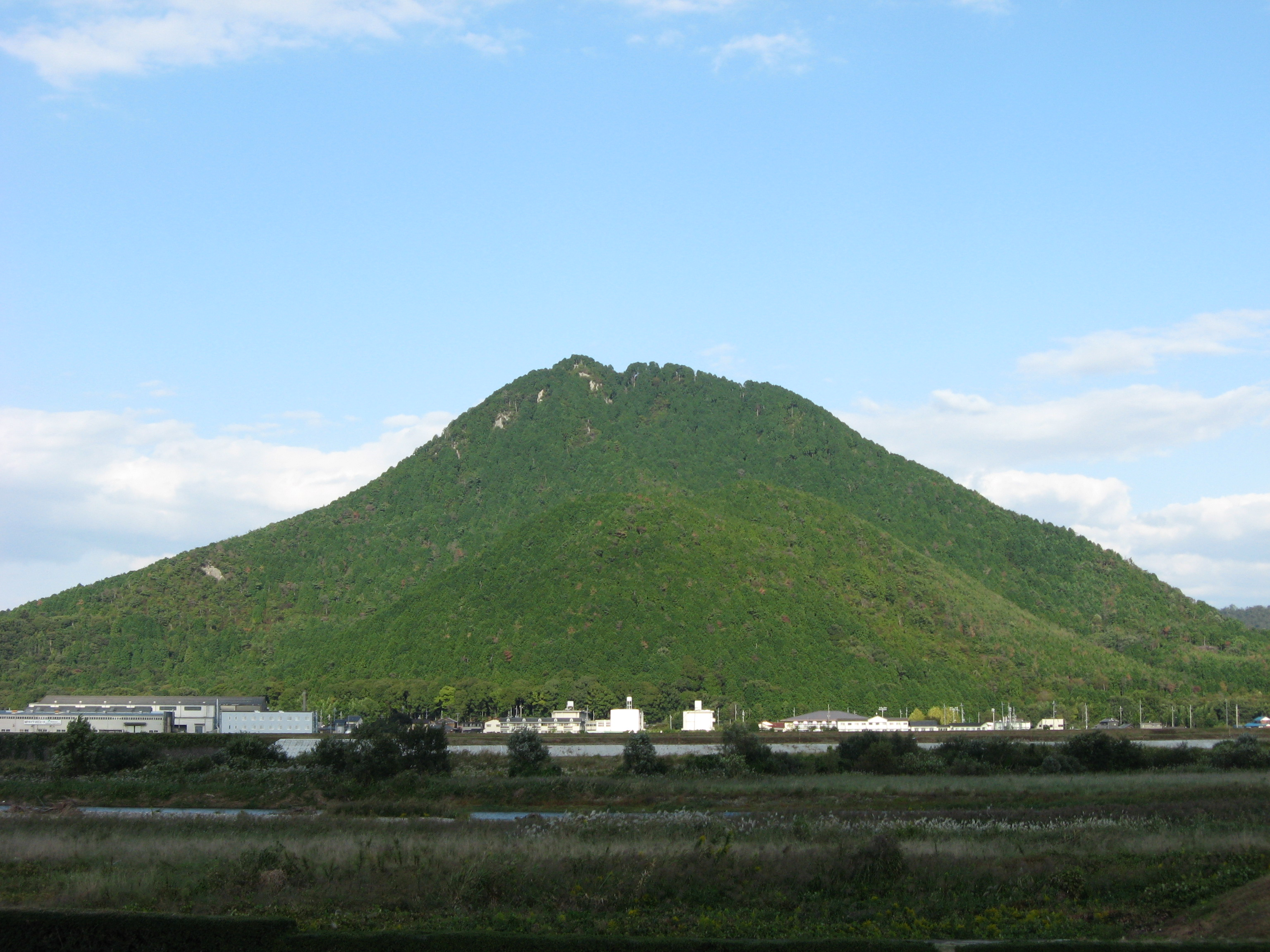
Mt Mikami, a symbol of the city

Yasu (野洲市, Yasu-shi) is a city located in Shiga Prefecture, Japan. As of 1 October 2021, the city had an estimated population of 50,695 in 20695 households and a population density of 630 persons per km^{2}. The total area of the city is 80.14 square kilometres (30.94 sq mi).

== Geography ==
Yasu is located in south-central Shiga Prefecture, on the eastern shore of Lake Biwa. The city skyline is dominated by Mount Mikami, also known as "Ōmi Fuji" from its resemblance to Mount Fuji. Parts of the city are within the borders of the Mikami-Tanakami-Shigaraki Prefectural Natural Park.

=== Neighboring municipalities ===
Shiga Prefecture

- Konan
- Moriyama
- Ōmihachiman
- Rittō
- Ryūō

=== Climate ===
Yasu has a humid subtropical climate (Köppen Cfa) characterized by warm summers and cool winters with light to no snowfall. The average annual temperature in Yasu is 14.5 °C. The average annual rainfall is 1430 mm with September as the wettest month. The temperatures are highest on average in August, at around 25.3 °C, and lowest in January, at around 3.1 °C.

== Demographics ==
Per Japanese census data, the population of Yasu doubled from 1960 to 2000 and has plateaued since then.

Historical population
Year	Pop.	±%
1960	24,091	—
1970	26,938	+11.8%
1980	38,144	+41.6%
1990	43,671	+14.5%
2000	48,326	+10.7%
2010	49,955	+3.4%
2020	50,513	+1.1%

== History ==
Yasu is part of ancient Ōmi Province and the route of the Tōsandō (later the Nakasendō) highway connecting Heian-kyō with the eastern provinces passed through the area; however, there were no shukuba within the city limits. Most of the area was tenryō territory under direct control of the Tokugawa shogunate in the Edo period. The minor feudal domain of Mikami Domain controlled by a cadet branch of the Endo clan had its jin'ya in Yasu, but its estates were widely scattered in other locations, mostly in Izumi province. The town of Yasu was established with the creation of the modern municipalities system on April 1, 1889. Yasu annexed the village of Mikami in 1942, and the villages of Shinohara and Gio in 1955, On October 1, 2004, Yasu absorbed the neighboring town of Chūzu (also from Yasu District) and was elevated to city status. Yasu District was dissolved as a result of this merger.

Mount Mikami (三上山), standing at an elevation of 432 meters, is affectionately known as "Omi Fuji (近江富士)," as referenced by Murasaki Shikibu (紫式部) in her poem: "Upon setting forth, I gaze upon Mikami's mountain; though snowless (打ち出でて 三上の山を 詠れば 雪こそなけれ 富士のあけぼの), it rivals Fuji at dawn." Historically cherished, this mountain is also known as "Mukade-yama" due to the legend of the giant centipede slain by Fujiwara Hidesato (Tawara Toda). It holds a storied past with mentions in the Kojiki and Engishiki, and has been celebrated in waka poetry. Matsuo Basho also composed a verse about it: "In Mikami's summer, its form is well known (三上山のみ夏知れる姿かな)."

The Mikami Shrine, situated at the mountain's base, venerates Mount Mikami as a sacred mountain. According to shrine tradition, on the 18th day of the 6th month in the 6th year of Emperor Kōrei's reign, the deity Amanomikage-no-mikoto descended upon the summit, and the shrine priest (Mikami no Hafuri) enshrined the mountain as a divine body (Kannabi). Archaeological excavations from the Meiji to Showa periods uncovered 24 bronze bells at the foot of Mount Mikami, suggesting that rituals have been conducted in the area since ancient times.

== Government ==
Yasu has a mayor-council form of government with a directly elected mayor and a unicameral city council of 18 members. Yasu contributes two members to the Shiga Prefectural Assembly. In terms of national politics, the city is part of Shiga 3rd district of the lower house of the Diet of Japan.

== Economy ==
The economy of Yasu is centered on agriculture and light manufacturing. There are several industrial parks in the city.

== Education ==
Yasu has six public elementary schools and three public middle schools operated by the city government. There is one public high school operated by the Shiga Prefectural Department of Education. The prefecture also operates one special education school for the handicapped.

== Transportation ==
=== Railway ===
JR West – Biwako Line

- Yasu

=== Highway ===
- National Route 8
- National Route 477

== Sister cities ==
- Clinton Township, Michigan, United States, since 1993

== Local attractions ==
- Mikami Shrine, with National Treasure honden
- Ōiwayama Kofun Cluster, a National Historic Site
- Ōsasahara Shrine, with National Treasure honden

== Notable people ==
- Saihei Hirose, industrialist, director of Sumitomo zaibatsu
- Kurumi Mamiya, voice actress
- Takanori Nishikawa, musician
- Kurama Tatsuya, former sumo wrestler and television personality
- Yuki Yamamoto, football player
- Teiichiro Fujita, economist and economic historian
