= Adrien Thibault =

French artist

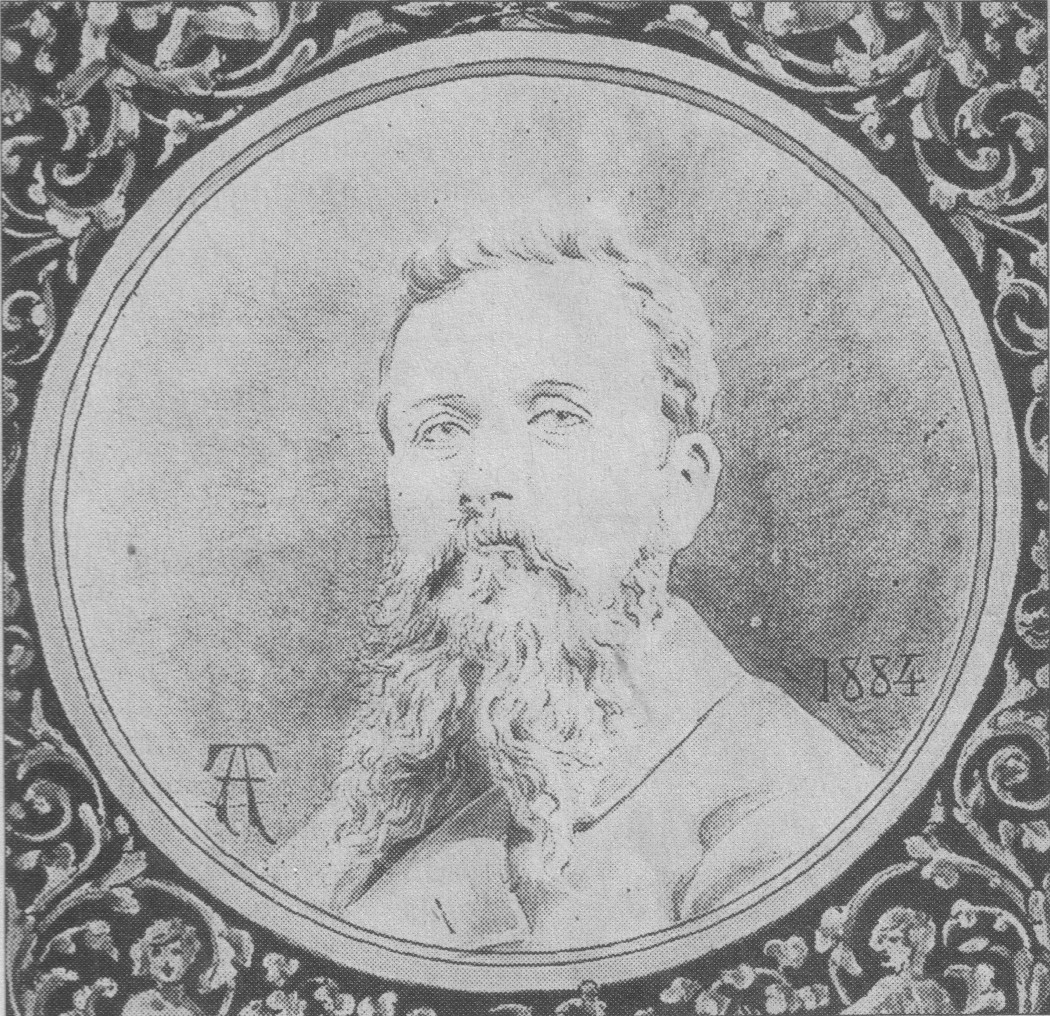
- Autoportrait
- Born: 18 November 1844; Villebarou, France
- Died: 13 April 1918 (aged 73); La Chaussée-Saint-Victor, France
- Known for: Ceramics, Writing
- Movement: Art Nouveau

Adrien Thibault (18 November 1844 – 13 April 1918) was a French ceramicist and historian. He was one of Ulysse Bernard's disciples in Blois, then he entered the Faïencerie de Gien by 1872. In 1874, he established his own workshop in La Chaussée-Saint-Victor, where he worked until his death. During his life, he conducted research on colors, and created so-called "Thibault Blues". The Adrien Thibault museum (Musée Adrien-Thibault) is located in La Chaussée-Saint-Victor, Loir-et-Cher.

== Gallery ==
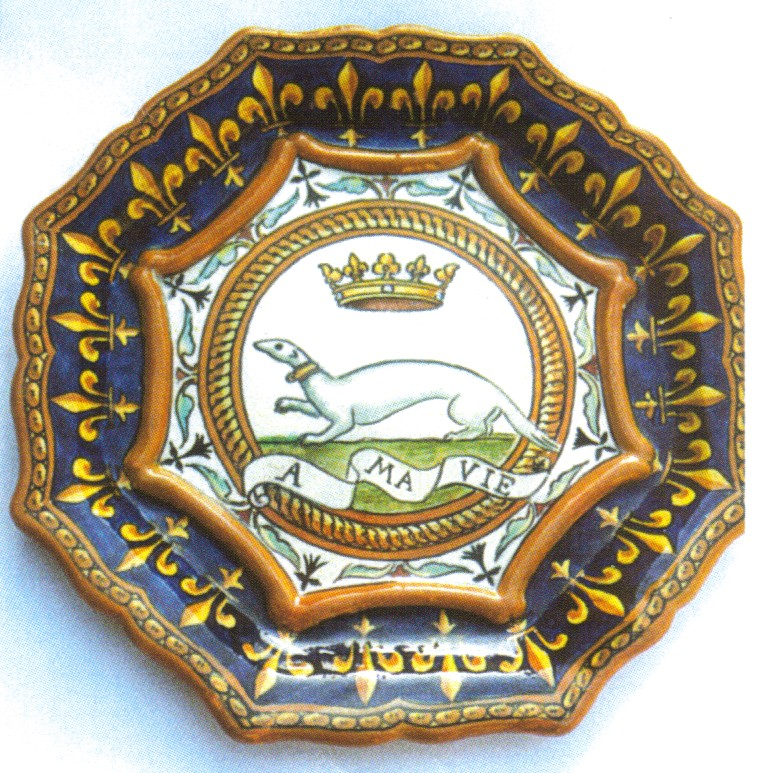

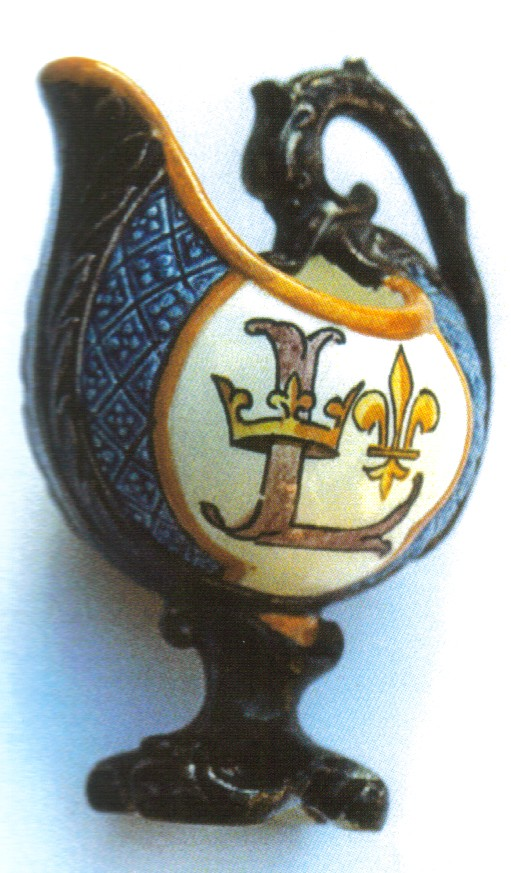

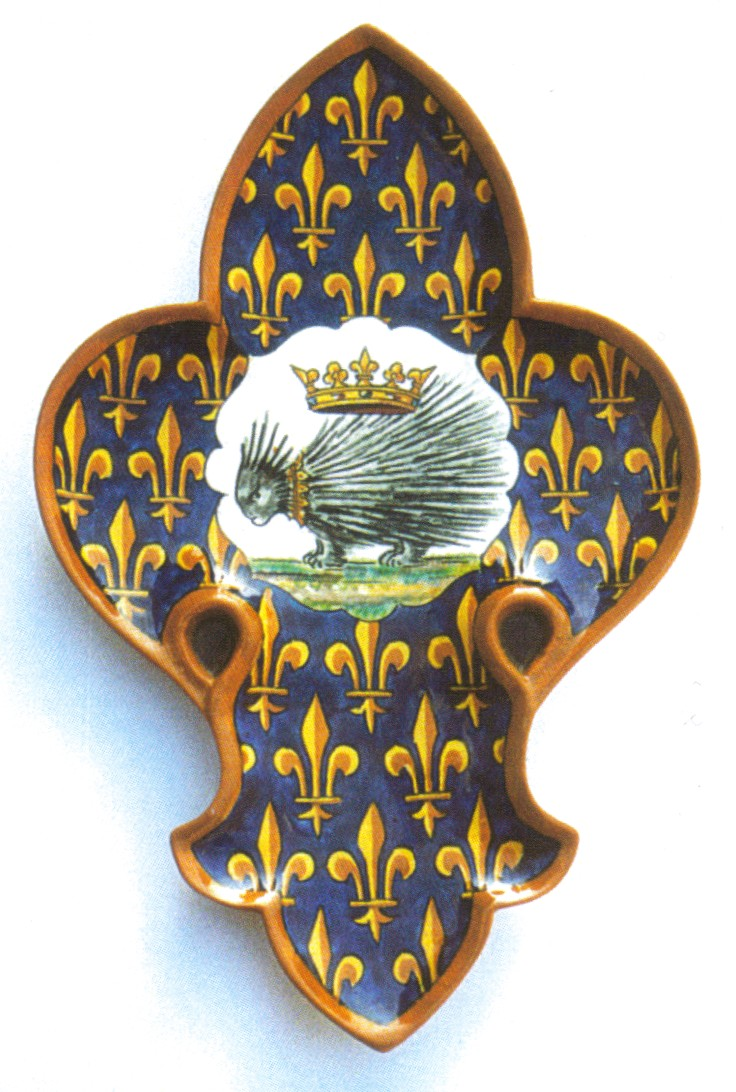

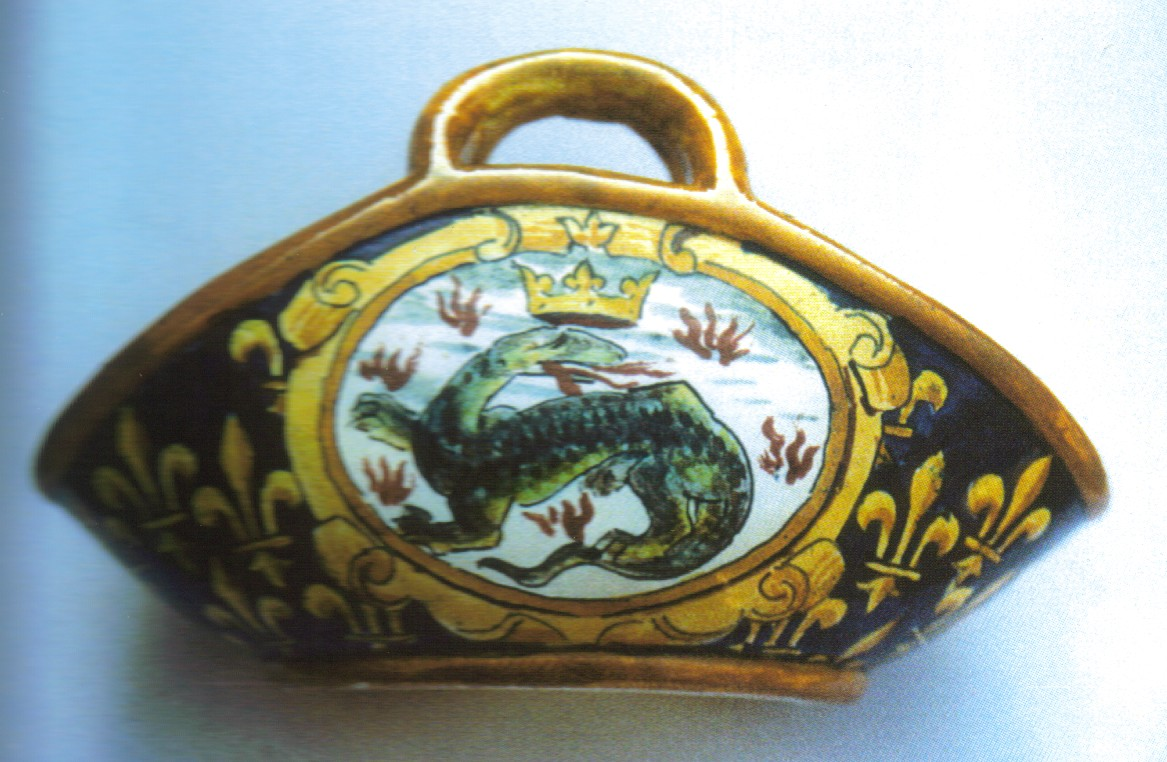
