= Ise Site =

- 伊勢遺跡 (Japanese)
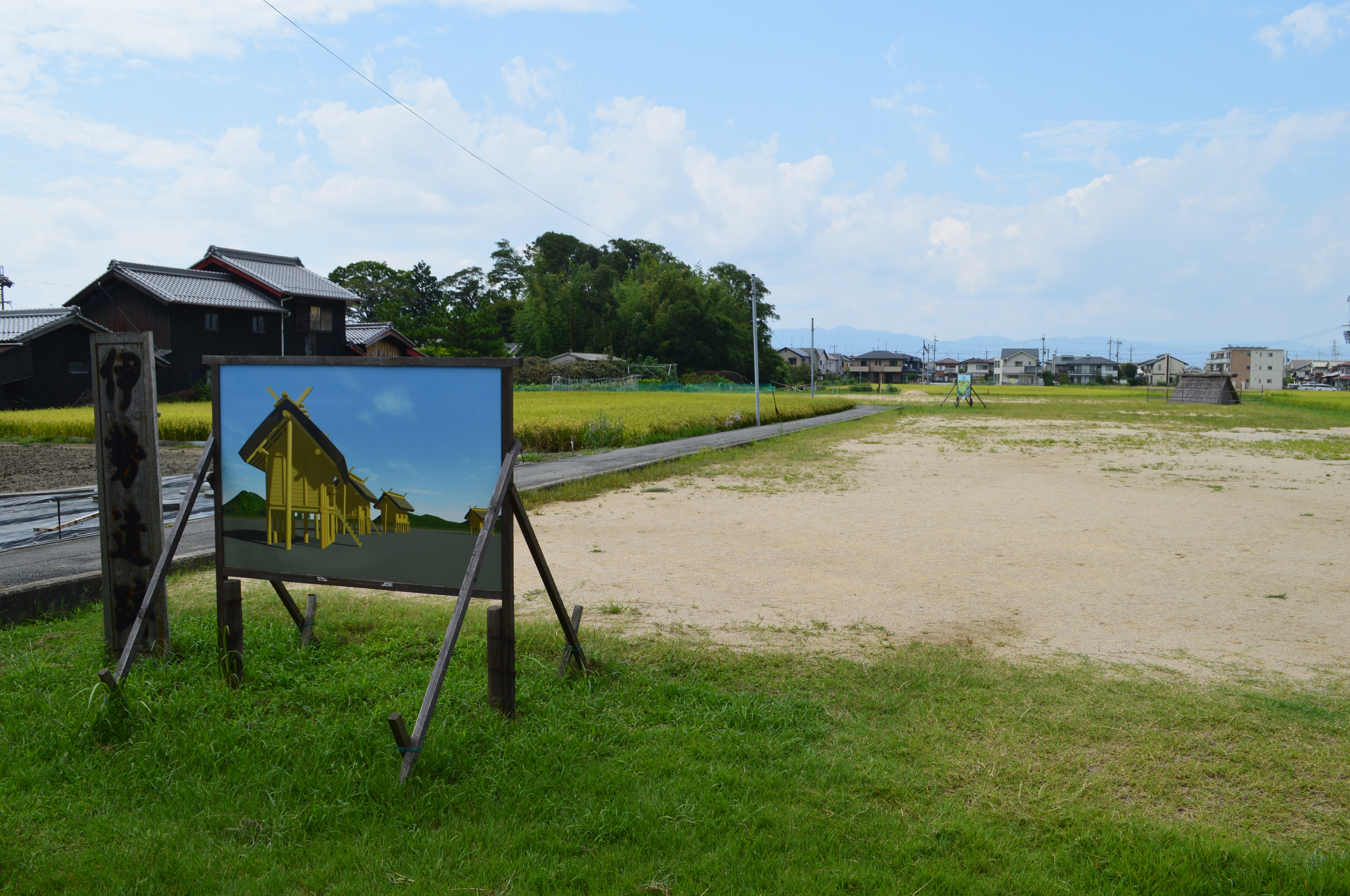
- Ise Site

- Ise Site Ise Site (Japan)
- 35°02′29″N 135°59′20″E
- Type: settlement
- Periods: Yayoi period
- Location: Moriyama - Rittō, Shiga, Japan
- Region: Kansai region

History
- Built: 1st-2nd century AD

Site notes
- Public access: Yes (no public facilities)

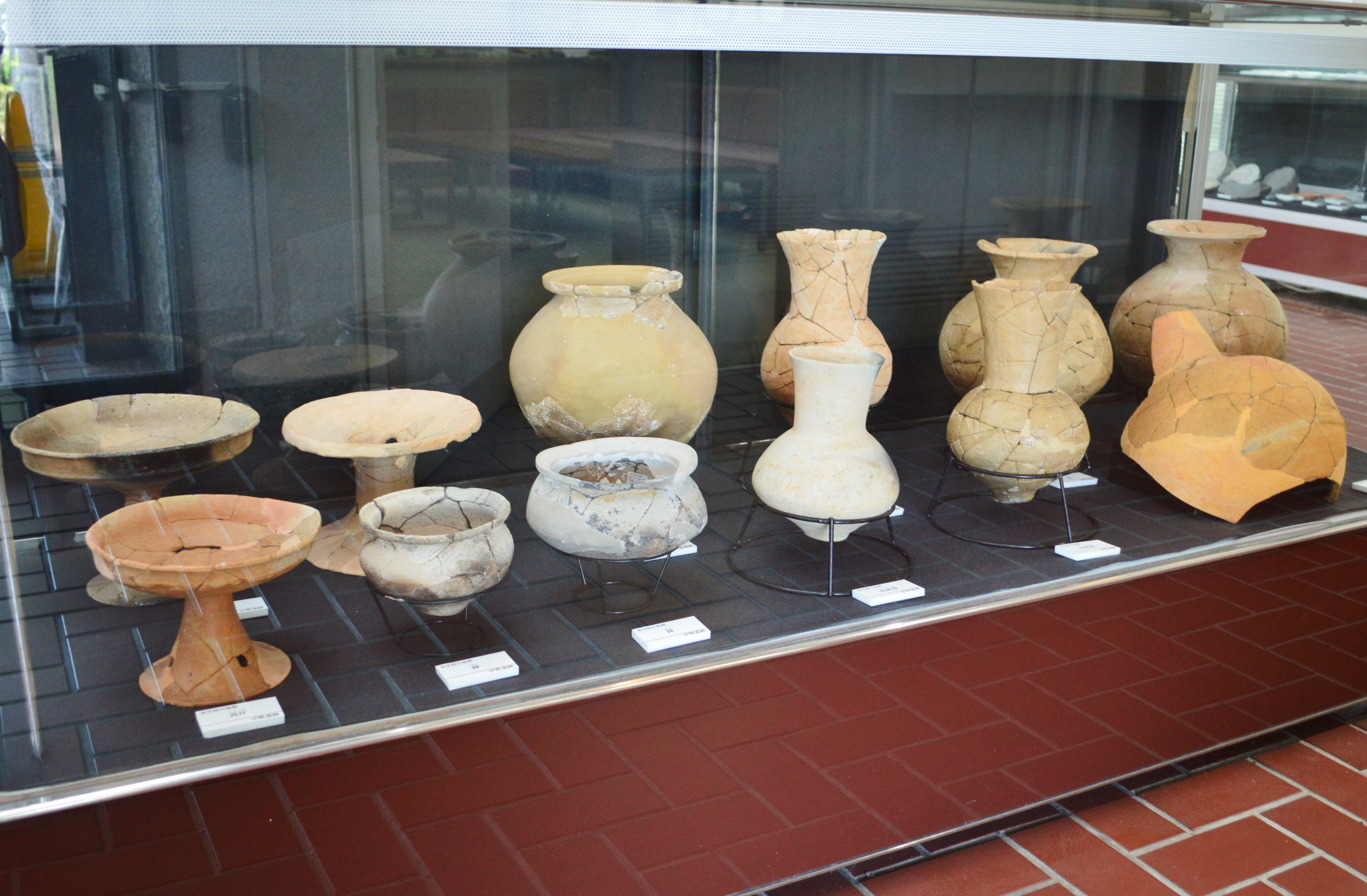
Yayoi pottery from the Ise Site

The Ise Site (伊勢遺跡) is an archaeological site containing the traces of a large Yayoi period settlement and ritual area, located across the Ise and Amura neighborhoods of Moriyama and the Nojiri neighborhood of the city of Rittō, Shiga in the Kansai region of Japan. The site was designated a National Historic Site of Japan in 2012.

== Overview ==
The Ise Site is located in the highlands of the Yasu River in southeastern Shiga Prefecture. It was confirmed as an archaeological site in 1981, and many archaeological excavations have been carried out so far. The site measures about 700 meters east-to-west and about 450 meters north-to-south. Of especial interest was the foundations of a group of large buildings dating from the 1st and 2nd centuries AD (latter half of the Yayoi period), which were found to be lined up neatly in an "L" arrangement in an enclosure surrounded by a fortification consisting of two sets of moats and an earthen ramparts with wooden palisades. The enclosure also had the foundations for a watchtower in the east, believed to be similar to what was discovered at the Yoshinogari site in Kyushu.

These large buried pillar buildings (which may have been political or ritual facilities) are surrounded by a separate group of buried pillar buildings arranged in a circle, with each building spaced 18 meters apart. These circumferential buildings have a foundation plan similar to that of Ise Grand Shrine and are therefore assumed to be shrine buildings. In addition, to the north of the outside of the circumferential buildings, was one of the largest pit dwellings found in Japan, measuring 13.6 meters on each side with a floor area of about 185 square meters. The building had internal pillars for support, and a floor made of baked clay bricks. This was presumably the residence of the king. A total of 13 large buildings have been detected in the excavations so far, and it is assumed that it was the center of politics and rituals in a kingdom which once existed in southern part of Ōmi. In the western half of the ruins, the foundations of a group of smaller pit dwellings were recognized. Unlike the larger square buildings, these nine buildings had pentagonal foundations, which matches the characteristics of Yayoi sites on the coast of the Sea of Japan and in other locations in southern Ōmi.

Excavated Yayoi pottery includes pottery finished with spatula polishing, which is mainly developed in the Kansai region, as well as style with a unique mouth edge which is found only in the Ōmi area.

In the vicinity of the Ise Site, the Hattori Site contains the remains of a vast system of early Yayoi period paddy fields, the Shimonogō Site is a settlement trace from the middle Yayoi period, and the Shinomagari Site, 1.2 kilometers to the southwest of the Ise Site, had the remains of a metalware production facility from the late Yayoi and early Kofun period.

The site is about a 10-minute walk from Rittō Station on the JR Central Tōkaidō Main Line.

== See also ==
- List of Historic Sites of Japan (Shiga)
