= Roger Somville =

Belgian painter

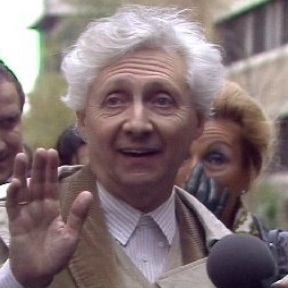
- Roger Somville
- Born: 13 November 1923; Brussels, Belgium
- Died: 31 March 2014 (aged 90); Tervuren, Belgium
- Education: Royal Academy of Fine Arts, Brussels, École nationale supérieure d'architecture et des arts décoratifs de Bruxelles
- Known for: Painting, mural, tapestry, drawing, printmaking
- Movement: Social realism, Monumental art
- Awards: Prix de la Critique (1968–69)

Roger Somville (Schaerbeek, 13 November 1923 – Tervuren, 31 March 2014) was a modern Belgian painter. He defended realism against modern abstract art, which he believed de-humanize human beings.

In his book, Peindre, he denounces among other things; "tricks in the shape of art", "empty productions", "triumph of less than nothing", "null simplism", "aesthete bricolage", "conformity of what's never been seen" and (the) "submissiveness of the modern art in a globalized market" ...

Somvile was a member of the Communist Party and accordingly wrote "La Création d’un art public exaltant la vie et le travail des hommes, leurs luttes, leurs souffrances, leurs joies, leurs victoires et leurs espoirs; art à placer à la portée de tous, là où passent et vivent les hommes". ("The Creation of a public art praising men's life and work, their fights, their griefs, their joys, their victories, and their hopes; an art made for everybody to carry it there where men pass and live.")

The entry in the LAROUSSE Grand Dictionnaire Encyclopédique describes Somville as "A Belgian Painter of an expressive and monumental style, concerned by the realities of the contemporary world."

== Background ==
Born in Brussels in 1923, Somville lost his father, a worker in marquetry, at an early age.

He and his mother faced a precarious material existence. His uncle, a lithographer and early Marxist, was a source of ideological influence. He took drawing lessons at the Académie Royale des Beaux-Arts in Brussels (1940–1942), and then went to The Higher National school for Architecture and the Decorative Arts of Brussels, (in the architect atelier Lucien François' atelier). It was here that he would meet the painter Charles Counhaye who was to show him the way to expressive and monumental art (1942–1945).

Somville as a young man was influenced by the rise of fascism, The Spanish Civil War, the workers' movement. He read Marx and Lenin. He admired Bertolt Brecht, Serge Eisenstein, Erwin, Piscator, Louis Armstrong, Charlie Chaplin and Eric von Stroheim.

== An advocate of realism ==
In 1946, he created the Centre de Rénovation de laTapisserie de Tournai with his friends Edmond Dubrunfaut and Louis Deltour and also the group Forces murales. In 1951, he founded atelier de la céramiquede Dour with his wife, Simone Tits.

Somville adopted the Aragon thesis, which was that "the central question in art had never been the battle between pure invention, which did not exist, and observation which is indispensable but rather one of the sense of the œuvre opposed to it futility".

He wrote the manifestos of the Realist Movement in 1958 and 1966 and developed thinking in his two books:

1. Pour le réalisme, un peintre s’interroge (1970) and
2. Hop-là les pompiers, les revoilà ! (1975).

He wrote two unpublished works: Notre temps (a mural at the metro station Hankar) and Peinture, novation, idéologie.

His sources are to be found in the work of the great masters and the giants epic paintings, among others Rubens, Goya, Gericault and Picasso (whom he met in 1951). Among his friends were Siqueiros, Guttuso, Pignon, Lorjou and Delvaux.

== Means of expression ==
Mural painting, aimed as it is as the widest possible audience, was a natural choice for Somville to make. His work was to range from tapestry, of which Le triomphe de la paix (80m^{2}/ 861 sq. ft), is doubtless the most well-known, to mural, which include the work Notre temps (600m^{2}/ 6,500 sq. ft.) at the Hankar metro, and the mural at the University of Louvain la Neuve of the theme qu’est-ce qu’un intellectuel?,(410m^{2}/4/1,330 ft), which he realized with the Collectif d’art public which he founded in 1980. His desire to create found expression in paintings which can be by turn wildly violent or strict and austere. In his drawings and etchings – both techniques which he used with masterly strength and charm – he could be satirical and ironic.

== Themes ==
Somville's political position was the result of his personal sensibility. Generosity, love of life, happiness and love all drove him to defend these human values by a political choice. Thus happiness, the implied other face to the coin, is represented in his work and as the result, his themes alternate as well.

They can be part of the collective epic: these are his compositions which attempt to tackle world events:

- Non à la guerre,
- La résistance (1950)
- Mineur (1953)
- La répression (1961)
- Socialisme pour l’Espagne
- Les réunions syndicales
- Vietnam (1966)
- Les peintres (1971–1977)
- Comité de quartier contre les missiles (1983)
- Un intellectuel (1981–1986)
- Le Peletier de Saint-Fargeau (1968–1987)

Alternatively, his energy expressed in caustic drawings: "La diarrhée intellectuelle", Les vernissages.

Other themes are intimate in tone and celebrate women, Hommage à Rubens, Les baigneuses, Les nus, Le modèle et son peintre are portraits of his wife Simone.

== Art ==
Somville's work is rooted in a refusal of what he considered to be futile aestheteism. However, his work is not therefore naturalist. Rather than copy reality, he took it as his source, reconstituting it and transforming it in new, pictural terms. Forms adapt themselves to the expression of a convictions, the pulsating, a character; they burst their limits, change their shape. The explosion of colours serves a desire to express the pulsating of an inner world, over and above the message. They thunder out, sometimes on the verge of the deliberate vulgarity, or, on the contrary are Gaiety and passionate love of live itself.

This is a long way from the anecdote or the tour de force. As Emile Langui says, "We are in the presence of a painter, in the absolute sense of the word."

His work as a painter, théoretician, lecturer and activist and his efforts for peace (he represented Belgium on the World Peace Council) were completed by his teaching life. At the Academy of Watermael-Boitsfort, which has become renowned under his direction, he trained numerous artists, independent of any artistic dogmatism. He directed the school from 1947 to 1986.

Somville's painting is known beyond the confines of a small coterie; retrospectives have been devoted to his work in Bruxelles, Paris, Moscow, Cologne, Sofia, Sofia, Mexico, Berlin, Saint-Denis, Bobigny, Liège, Budapest and La Havane, etc.

Among the collective exhibitions in which Somville's work has appeared are the Mostra Internationale di Bianco e Nero at Lugano (1960), the Biennale Internationale d’art at Venice (1962), the Biennale Internationale de la tapisserie at Lausanne (1962 and 1965), figuration et défiguration, at the Hedendaagse Kunst Museum in Ghent (1964), the Salon de mai, in Paris (1977), L’art belge depuis (1945), at the Musée des Beaux-Arts André Malraux, Le Havre (1982), then Salon International d’art, at Basle (1985), and other exhibitions including Amsterdam, Utrecht, Antwerp, Ostend, Ljubljana, Frechen, Rijeka, Heidelberg, Venise and Paris.

Somville's work is to be found in numerous museums in Belgium (the Moderne Art Museum in Brussels), and abroad (Mexico, Dresde, Faenza, the Hermitage in Saint Petersburg, Sofia, Paris and Lund). Among the various important prizes he has been awarded is the "Prix de le Critique" with Hans Bellmer, (1968–69).
