= Françoise Adnet =

French painter

- Born: 30 June 1924; Paris, France
- Died: 9 March 2014 (aged 89); Paris, France
- Occupations: Painter, concert pianist
- Spouse: Max Fourny
- Website: www.francoise-adnet.com

Françoise Adnet (30 June 1924 – 9 March 2014) was a French figurative painter born in Paris.

She originally was a professional pianist, but gradually switched to painting by 1951. Her works, created over a period of 50 years, have been exhibited many times and are held are in various museums and private collections. The pieces follow two main themes: female figures and cityscapes. Her figurative works are considered her best work, exhibiting a distinctive technique.

Adnet was married to Max Fourny, the art collector and gallerist. A museum of naive art is now housed in their former home.

== Biography ==
Adnet was born in the Montmartre neighborhood of Paris, France, on 30 June 1924 to parents Jacques and Luce Adnet. Her father, Jacques Adnet, was a renowned decorator and designer. She began playing the piano at the age of 4, also discovering her talent for painting at the age of 5. Adnet attended music classes under the tutelage of professors Marguerite Long and Alfred Cortot and later attended the Conservatoire de Paris to continue her study under Marcel Ciampi. Adnet was encouraged by her mother to continue her practice, especially during the family's annual trips to Vezelay. It was said by Adnet's father that she did not know the meaning of the expression "Do Nothing". She gave her first piano recital at the age of 12.

Through her years of practice, Adnet became an internationally renowned concert pianist. From 1946 to 1951, Adnet traveled Europe to perform, often to Germany. In 1948 she was asked by the French government to join a cultural tour to entertain the occupying troops present in the city. Adnet was known for her versatility in performing works of Chopin, Bach, Beethoven, Debussy, Schubert, and Mozart.

Despite such a successful career in performance, Adnet decided to transition to a career of painting. In 1951 she became a full-time painter. Adnet was self-taught, and over her 70-year career was able to produce more than 3,500 works. She was well known for her talents in drawing and painting, and in 1981 she received the First Eural Prize for drawing in Brussels.

She was heavily influenced, like Bernard Buffet and Jean Jansem, by her friend Francis Gruber. She was identified with figurative reaction – opposed to abstraction – and was part of the "misérabiliste" movement, which included Buffet, Jansem, and Michel de Gallard among others.

Adnet met her future husband, Max Fourny, who was an art publisher, through her work. Fourny was 20 years older, and so the marriage was not condoned by Adnet's parents. However, the two were married on 8 October 1951.

== Art ==

Adnet's style is known as post-war figurative art. Common subjects of her paintings were animals, flowers, and the landscapes of Paris. Adnet would often bring back objects from her extensive travels that she found interesting enough to paint. She had a workshop where she would paint for hours daily. Adnet described her artistic process as "a long exercise of observation, patience, composition, implementation and harmonization." The work reminded her of her efforts to perfect her skills at piano, and she often incorporated the same techniques, stating her artwork had "harmony, rigor, consonances and dissonances." Most of her works were oil paintings, with a minority of them being drawings. She is also known for completing nudes and still lifes.

Of her painting, Adnet was known to favor portraits, most of which were of female subjects. Adnet once said, "Every portrait is my self-portrait ... I project myself into every character I paint." Her characters were often dark or brooding, or in distress. Even in her nudes, Adnet intended not to show beauty of nakedness, but to show tragedy in her painted figures.

Her drawings were often of children or animals. A common theme is that of a caged bird.

== Awards ==
- Grand Prize of the Bruges Biennale
- Silver Medal of the City of Paris
- Gemmail Prize for Sacred Art
- First Eural Prize in drawing
- European Contemporary Painting Prize
- Grand prize of Painting of French Artists
- Sandoz Award, Taylor Foundation, Paris
