= Michel de Gallard =

French painter

Michel de GALLARD
- Born: 22 April 1921; Villefranche-d'Allier, France
- Died: 1 July 2007 (aged 86)
- Education: Les Arts Décoratifs, Académie de la Grande Chaumière
- Known for: Painting
- Movement: La Ruche
- Spouse: Claude Autenheimer

Michel de Gallard (22 April 1922 – July 2007) was a French painter.

He is considered a member of the School of Paris and La Ruche and is associated with French artists Bernard Buffet and Bernard Lorjou with whom he founded the Anti-Abstract Art Group "L'homme Témoin".

== Awards ==
- 1949 Member of the Salon d'Automne
- 1950 Founder Member of the Salon de la Jeune Peinture
