= Adnet (surname) =

Adnet is a surname. Notable people with the surname include:

- Françoise Adnet (1924–2014), French painter
- Jacques Adnet (1901–1984), French designer and architect
- Marcelo Adnet (born 1981), Brazilian actor, comedian, and VJ
