= Shimonogō Site =

Shimogō Site
- 下之郷遺跡 (Japanese)
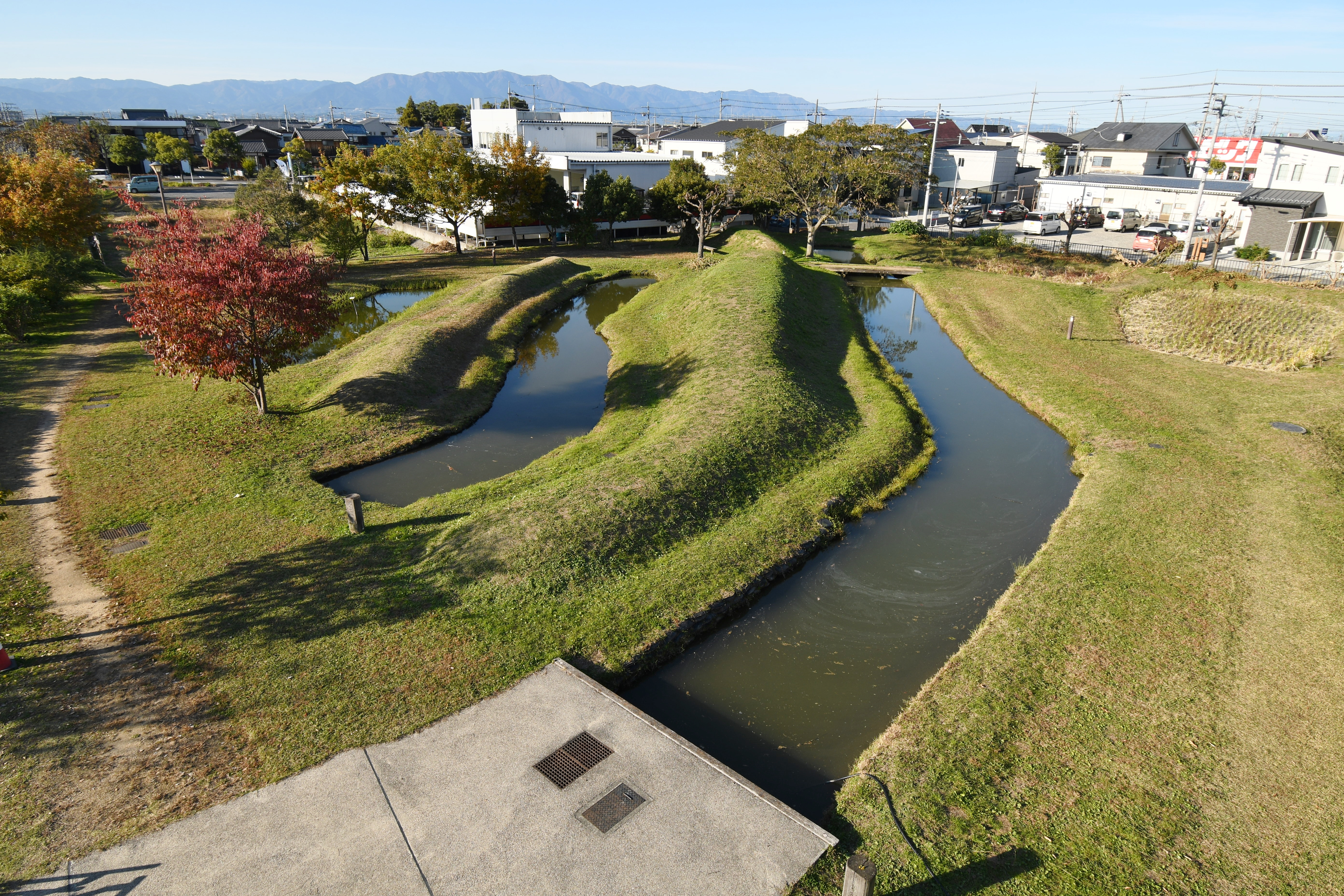
- Shimogō Site

- Shimogō Site Shimonogō Site (Japan)
- 35°03′59″N 135°59′23″E
- Periods: Yayoi period
- Location: Moriyama, Shiga, Japan
- Region: Kansai region

Site notes
- Public access: Yes (no facilities)

The Shimogō Site (下之郷遺跡, Shimogō iseki) is an archaeological site containing the ruins of a Yayoi period fortified settlement, located in what is now part of the city of Moriyama, Shiga Prefecture in the Kansai region of Japan. It was designated a National Historic Site of Japan in 2002.

== Overview ==
The Shimogō site is located in the central part of alluvial lowland of the lower Yasu River. One of the largest Yayoi settlements yet discovered, it was surrounded by six rings of moats. The initial discovery of the settlement was in 1980, when fragments of Yayoi pottery were found during construction of sewerage works. In 1984, the remains of a triple set of moats was discovered during road construction. These moats had a width of five meters and depth of approximately 1.5 meters. In 1997, an additional set of moats were discovered in the northeast quadrant of the site, forming an outer set of defenses. The innermost of these outer moats had a width of eight meters and depth of two meters. In 2001, traces of this outer set of moats was discovered on the western edge of the site as well. The area of the settlement enclosed by the inner moats is approximately 330 meters east-to-west by 260 meters from north-to-south, or approximately 70,000 square meters. When the outer moats are taken into consideration, the size of the settlement becomes 600 meters from east-to-west by 330 meters north-to-south, or 220,000 square meters.

The settlement itself also contains an innermost most, measuring 75 meters east-to-west by 100 meters north-to-south, with the foundation of a very large building in the center. This building was a raised-floor building, built with pillars sunk directly into the ground, and has been rebuilt at least five times. It s believed to have been a palace or used for meetings or ceremonial purposes. All of the other building traces at the site are raised-floor structures, and unusually, no pit dwellings appear to have been built. In addition to Yayoi earthenware, a large number of wooden artifacts, woven baskets and stone tools have been excavated from the site. Since the site has a high groundwater level, much organic material, including plant seeds and animal bones have been preserved. DNA analysis of excavated rice revealed that it was a tropical species, which is not cultivated in modern Japan. Dendrochronology of some wooden artifacts yielded a date of 223 BC.

On the west side of the village, part of the moat that was backfilled to form a bridge with a width of three meters.This appears to have been the entrance to the village, and there are traces of fences and gate posts. In the surroundings of this bridge, many fragments of bronze swords, ground stone tools, broken bows, wooden shields, and arrow or spearheads have been excavated, suggesting that there was once a large-scale armed conflict at the entrance of the village.

The site is approximately 24 minutes on foot from the JR West Biwako Line Moriyama Station and is now an archaeological park with a museum.

== See also ==
- List of Historic Sites of Japan (Shiga)
