= Canton of Blois-2 =

Canton of Loir-et-Cher, France

Coordinates: 47.59°N 1.34°E

The Canton of Blois-2 (French: canton de Blois-2, [kɑ̃tɔ̃ də blwa dø]) is a canton in the French department of Loir-et-Cher, Centre-Val de Loire, France. Its borders were modified at the French canton reorganisation which came into effect in March 2015. Its seat is in Blois.

It consists of the following communes:

1. Blois (partly)
2. La Chaussée-Saint-Victor
3. Menars
4. Saint-Denis-sur-Loire
5. Villebarou
6. Villerbon
