= Ewald Mataré =

German painter and sculptor (1887–1965)

Ewald Wilhelm Hubert Mataré (25 February 1887 in Burtscheid, Aachen – 28 March 1965 in Büderich) was a German painter and sculptor, who dealt with, among other things, the figures of men and animals in a stylized form.

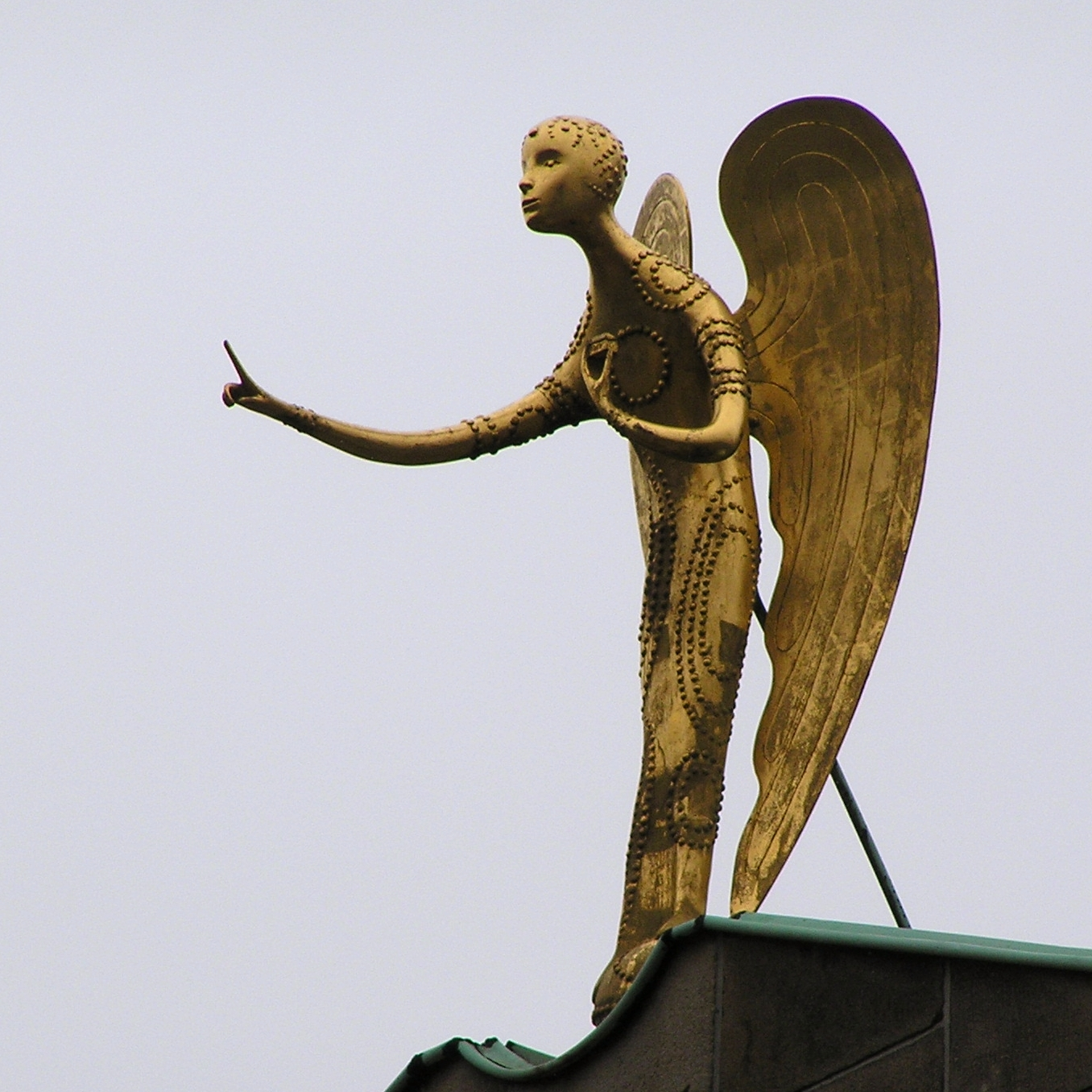
Angel at the Bishop's apartments of the Diocese of Essen

== Career ==
Mataré began his instruction as an artist at the Prussian Academy of Arts in Berlin in 1907. He was a student of Julius Ehrentraut (born 1841), Lovis Corinth (1858–1925), and the history painter Arthur Kampf. In 1918, he joined the November Group. Mataré first dedicated himself to sculpture after finishing his painting studies. A great part of his sculpted work is of animal figures.

In 1932 he received a professorship at the Düsseldorf Academy of Fine Arts. After the seizure of control of 1933 however, all cultural and artistic life in Germany was brought into ideological alignment by the Nazis; Mataré was denounced as "degenerate" and expelled from his position. One of his sculptures, Die Katze (The Cat), was placed in the exhibition of shame and derision Entartete Kunst (Degenerate Art) staged by the Nazis in Munich in 1937. Church commissions became his sole source of income.

After the war, Mataré was asked to become the director of the Düsseldorf Academy of Fine Arts, but he quickly resigned because he felt there were still too many professors at the Akademie who had been actively teaching there during the Third Reich. Furthermore, no one was interested in his ambitious reform plans, which would have allowed fourteen-year-olds to study at the Akademie. However he was active at the Academy – albeit in an off-site studio – for long enough to teach artists like Günter Haese, Erwin Heerich, Georg Meistermann, Hannes Rosenow, and, most famously, Joseph Beuys. During the post-war era, Mataré took many commissions from the public sector; he also worked on many churches, e.g. he built four doors for the south portal of the Cologne Cathedral. He participated in documenta 1 (1955) and 2 (1959).

== Work ==
Matare's work varies from the simplicity of his animal forms in which he explores shape and line, to the profound spirituality of his religious works. A 2006 exhibition of his work in Salzburg, Austria, demonstrated the heights which his work could achieve.

== Personal life ==
In 1922, Mataré married the 31-year-old Hanna Hasenbäumer. Nonetheless, at 37 years old, he entered into a deep depression. They had a daughter, Sonja Beatrice (b. 9 August 1926). Mataré died in 1965 from a pulmonary embolism.

His nephew Herbert Franz Mataré (1912–2011) was a German physicist and co-inventor of the "European transistor" in 1948.

== Awards ==
- 1914 Silver Medal at the Prussian Academy of Arts in Berlin.
- 1952 Thorn Prikker Prize from the city of Krefeld
- 1955 Gold medal at the Milan Triennial
- 1957 Stefan Locher Medal from the City of Cologne
- 1958 Großes Verdienstkreuz of the Federal Republic of Germany

== Works ==
Mataré's most famous works include:

- Doors of the south portal of Cologne Cathedral
- Doors of the Church of Peace in Hiroshima
- Altar design in St. Andreas Church in Düsseldorf
- The entire interior of St. Rochus Church in Düsseldorf (partially destroyed, lost)
- The phoenix in the North Rhine-Westphalia Parliament (Landtag) building
- The pigeon fountain in front of Cologne Cathedral
- Entrance gate and windows of the Kunstakademie Düsseldorf
- Portal of St. Lambertus Basilica in Düsseldorf
- Façade as well as Portal and Balcony at the Essen Minster Schatzhaus.
- Façade of Haus Atlantis in Bremen
- Soldier Memorial in Cleves
- His last large project (1965): Entrance doors and décor of the chapel at the Catholic Social Institute (KSI) of the Archdiocese of Cologne in Bad Honnef.
