= Villerbon =

- Commune
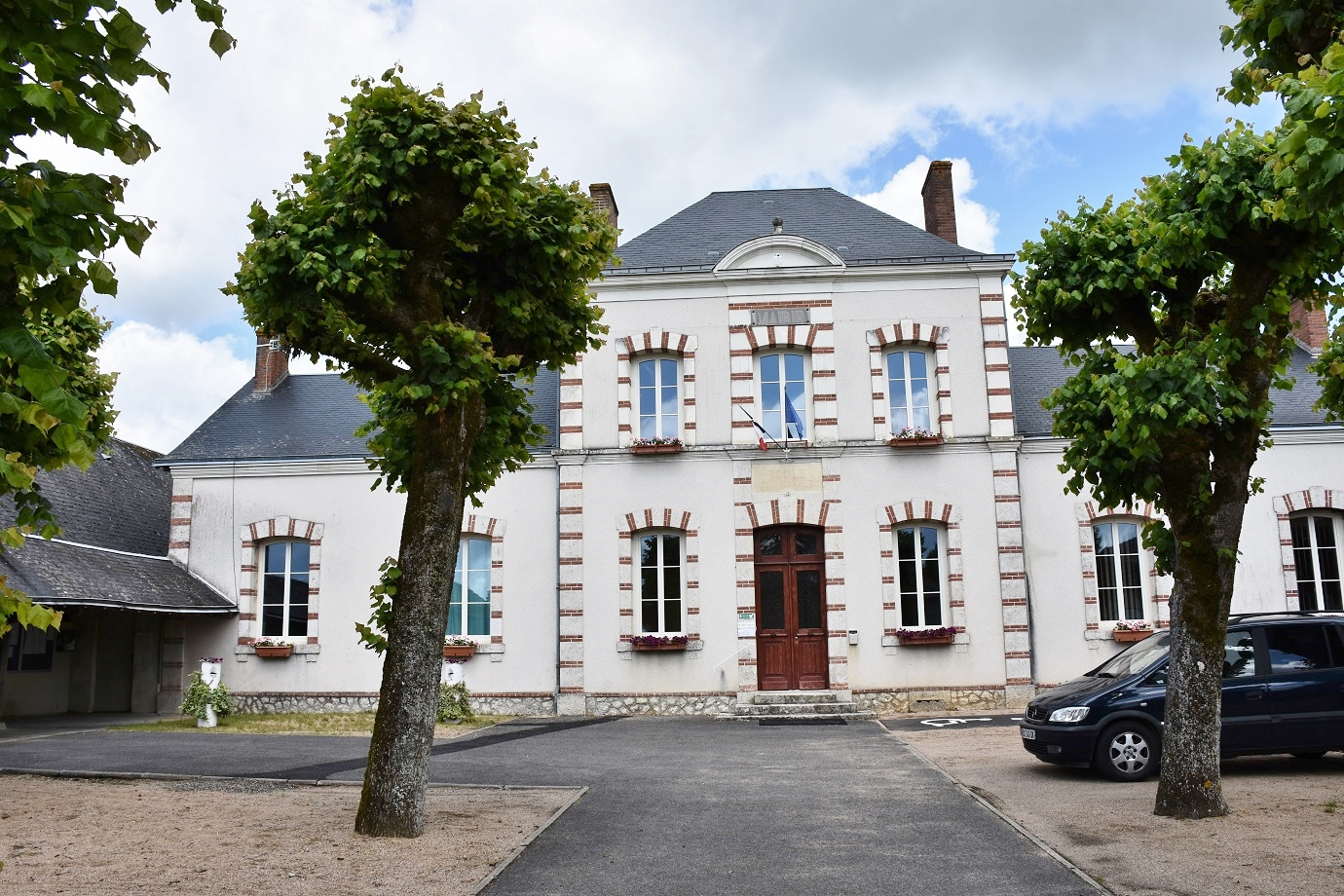
- Town hall of Villerbon
- Location of Villerbon
- Location within France Location within Centre-Val de Loire
- Coordinates: 47°39′47″N 1°22′21″E
- Country: France
- Region: Centre-Val de Loire
- Department: Loir-et-Cher
- Arrondissement: Blois
- Canton: Blois-2
- Intercommunality: CA Blois Agglopolys

Government
  - Mayor (2020–2026): Jean-Marc Moretti
- Area^{1}: 17.28 km^{2} (6.67 sq mi)
- Elevation: 118 m (387 ft)
- Highest elevation: 117 m (384 ft)
- Lowest elevation: 101 m (331 ft)
- Population (2023): 849
  - Density: 49.1/km^{2} (127/sq mi)
- Time zone: UTC+01:00 (CET)
  - Summer (DST): UTC+02:00 (CEST)
- INSEE/Postal code: 41288 /41000
- ^{1} French Land Register data, which excludes lakes, ponds, glaciers > 1 km^{2} (0.386 sq mi or 247 acres) and river estuaries.

Villerbon (pronounced [vilɛʁbɔ̃]) is a commune in the Loir-et-Cher department, central France.

== Population ==
Historical population
Year	Pop.	±% p.a.
1968	468	—
1975	538	+2.01%
1982	660	+2.96%
1990	761	+1.80%
1999	682	−1.21%
2007	762	+1.40%
2012	790	+0.72%
2017	799	+0.23%
2023	849	+1.02%
Source: INSEE

== See also ==
- Communes of the Loir-et-Cher department
