= Eugène Narbonne =

French painter and professor

Eugène Narbonne (1885–1973) was a figurative French painter and professor at the École nationale supérieure des beaux-arts in Paris.

He is also known for his students: Maurice Boitel, Hannes Rosenow, Georgette Piccon, Bernard Buffet and Louis Vuillermoz.
