= Hannes Rosenow =

German painter (1925–2000)

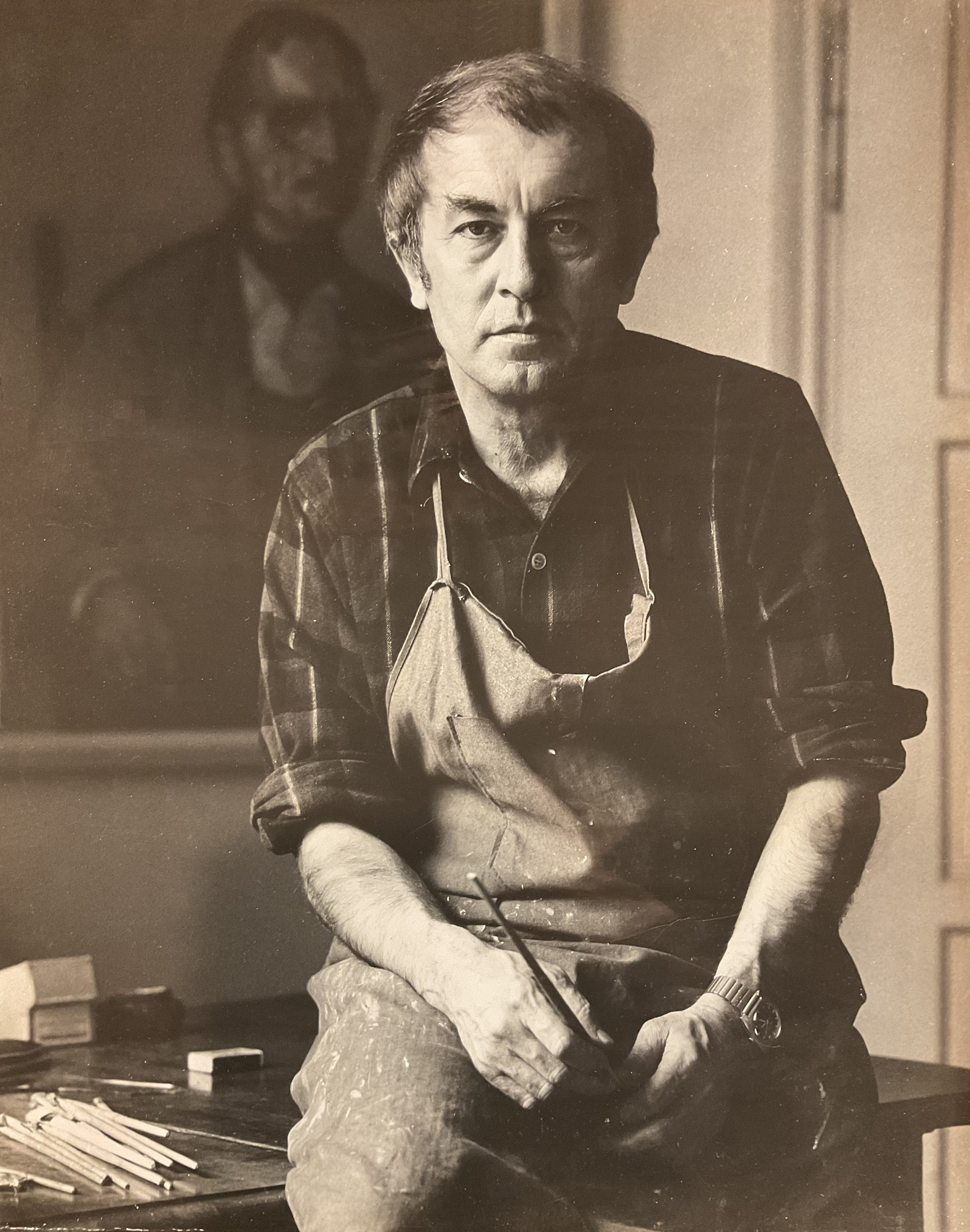
Hannes Rosenow in his atelier in Munich, ca. 1977

Hannes Rosenow (5 May 1925 in Ratibor – 28 July 2000 in Munich) was a German portrait and landscape painter.

== Biography ==
After his graduation from the gymnasium in Ratibor in Upper Silesia, military draft and release from military internment in 1946, Rosenow studied at the Kunstakademie Düsseldorf and at the Beaux-Arts de Paris with Ewald Mataré and Eugène Narbonne. In 1948 he married Gisela Thiele and they had two children (Katharina and Felix).

From 1948 to 1952 he worked and lived in Tübingen, Paris and the South of France. From 1952 until his death in 2000 he worked as a self-employed artist in Munich. Study trips took him to Italy, France, Yugoslavia and Greece, portrait commissions to the USA. He was a member and 1987-1990 president of the new Munich artists association NMKG and also a member of the Seerosenkreis, a group of artists, sculptors and writers in Munich.

Portraits, still lifes and southern landscapes were his preferred genres. "Clear and austere stand the motives on the canvas; their distinctive mark is not gracefulness, but a balance between calm and tension. The decorative is less important than color and graphic outlines. ... His landscapes are fascinating portraits of a detail of nature; no random views, but well arranged insights and interpretations generalized to the typical and universal."

Hannes Rosenow participated almost every year in the great art exhibit in the Haus der Kunst in Munich and was a member of its exhibit committee from 1994 to 1998. In 1972 he received the Seerosen prize for the arts from the city of Munich. His work is owned by the city of Munich, the State of Bavaria, but mostly by private collectors in Germany, Belgium, France, Italy, Switzerland, England and in the USA.

== Literature ==
- Hannes Rosenow. "Hos Olivetti" København. 12 Januar - 4 Februar 1971, Hos Olivetti, Lersø (Copenhagen 1971)
- Hannes Rosenow: Ölgemälde, ed. by Stiftung Haus Oberschlesien, Ratingen (Dülmen 1978)
- M.L. Rampfl, Hannes Rosenow: Kollektivausstellung. Pavillon alter Botanischer Garten (Munich 1956)
