= Bernard Buffet =

French painter (1928–1999)

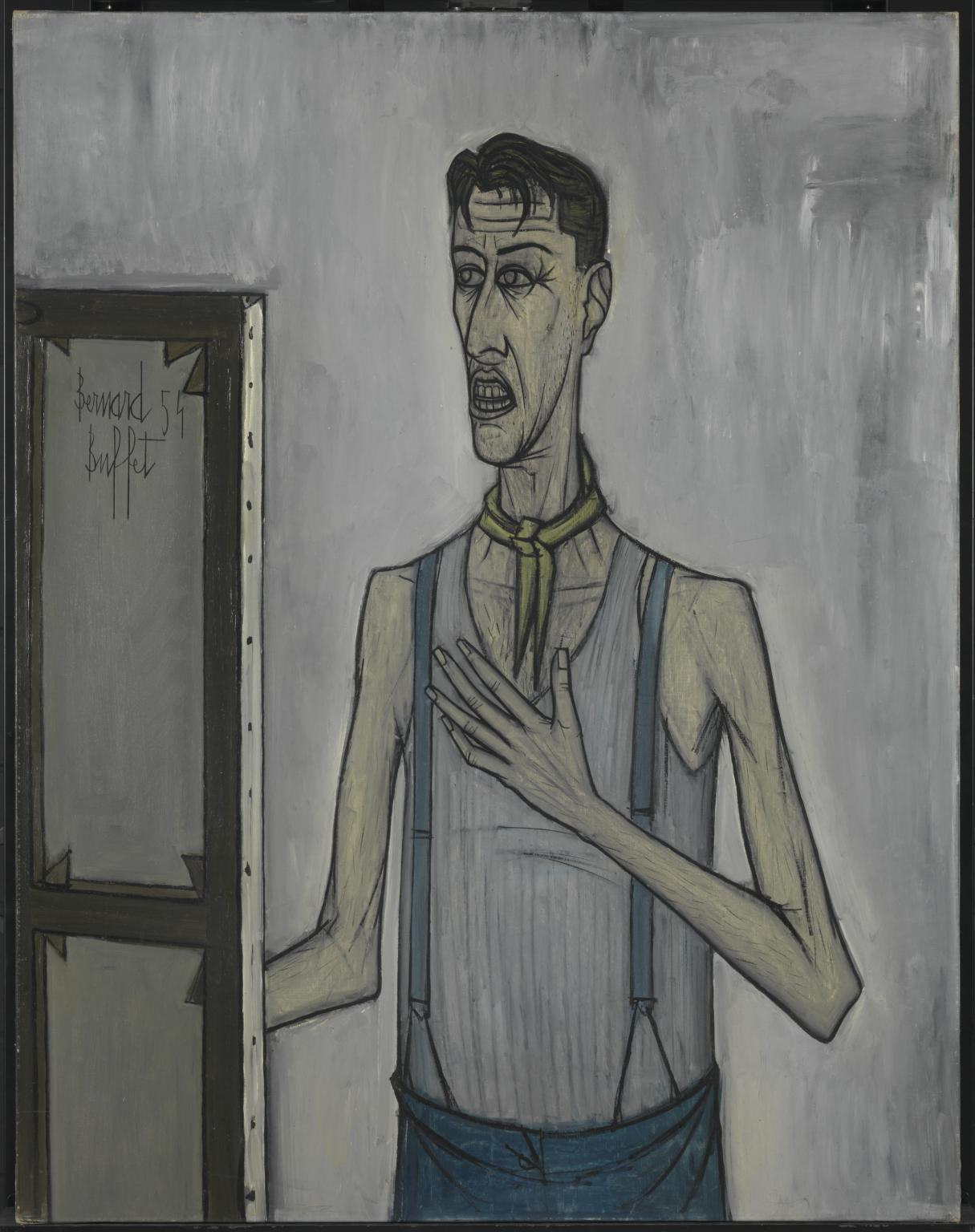
- Self Portrait (1954), Tate Modern
- Born: 10 July 1928; Paris, France
- Died: 4 October 1999 (aged 71); Tourtour, France
- Education: École Nationale Supérieure des Beaux-Arts, Marie-Thérèse Auffray
- Known for: Painting, drawing, printmaking
- Movement: Expressionism, Abstract Realism
- Awards: Member of the Salon d'Automne, 1947; Member of the Société des Artistes Indépendants, 1947; Prix de la Critique, 1948; Prix Puvis de Chavannes, 1950; Officer of the Légion d'Honneur, 1973; Member of the Académie des Beaux-Arts, 1974

Signature
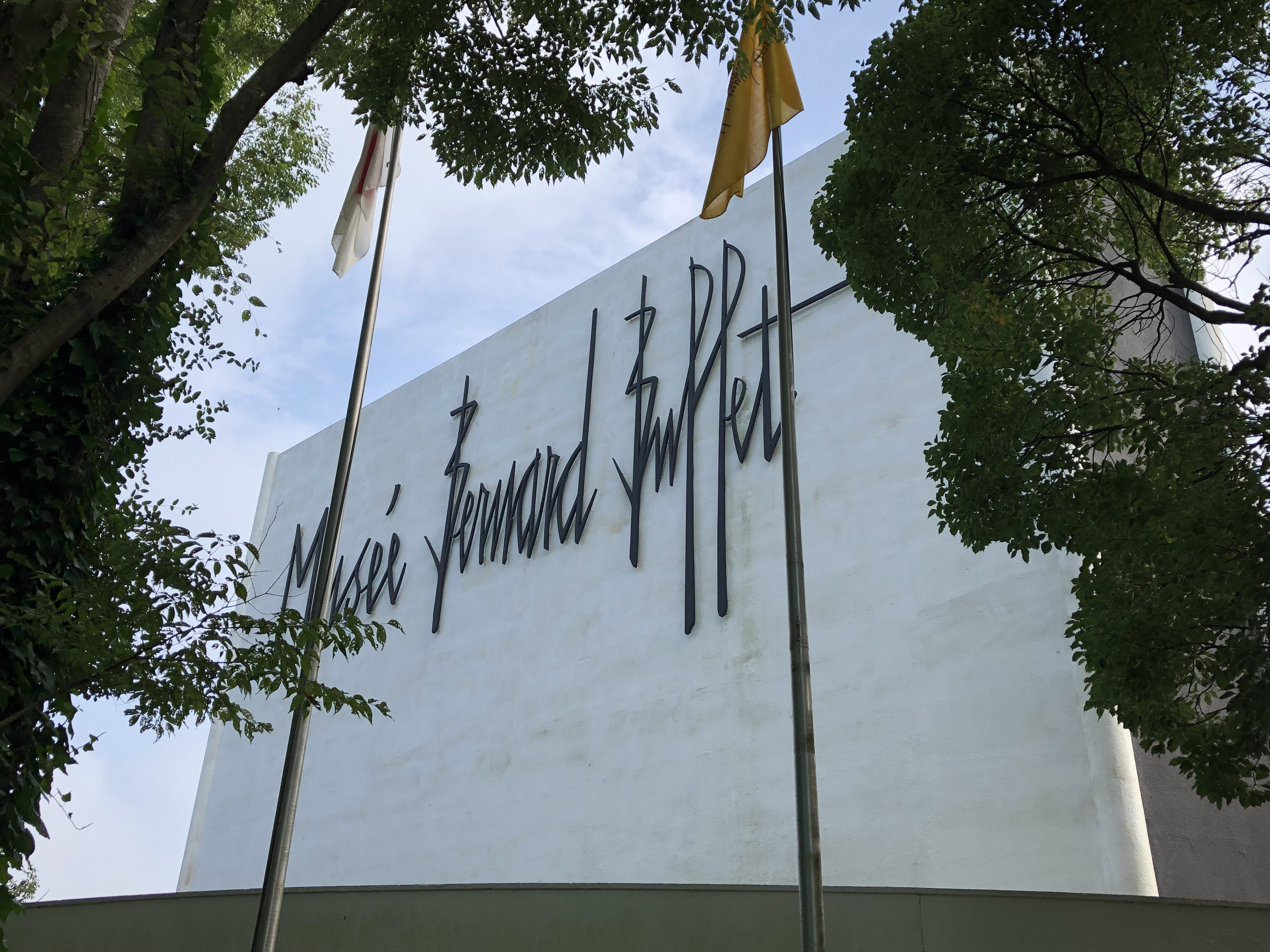

Bernard Buffet (French: [bɛʁnaʁ byfɛ]; 10 July 1928 – 4 October 1999) was a French painter, printmaker, and illustrator. An extremely prolific artist, he produced a varied and extensive body of work. His style was exclusively figurative and is often classified as Expressionist and Misérabilisme, as well as figurative collectives such as L'Homme-Témoin and La Jeune Peinture. Art historians have also classified his formal style as "abstract realism"—a framework in which recognizable, everyday figurative subjects are flattened, enclosed within rigid geometric grids, and stripped of cast shadows to assert the two-dimensional autonomy of the canvas. Curators have further noted that the emotional detachment, repetition, and formal rigidity of his figures share close affinities with New Objectivity (Neue Sachlichkeit) portraiture and the anti-subjective descriptive style of the Nouveau Roman.

Buffet enjoyed worldwide popularity in the 1950s and was often compared to Pablo Picasso for his fame and talent. By the end of the 1950s, however, the public and art community turned strongly against him due to the rise of abstraction, public backlash against his affluent lifestyle, and accusations of excessive commercial serialization. Major 21st-century museum retrospectives in Frankfurt (2008) and Paris (2016) prompted an art-historical re-evaluation of his graphic methods and market strategies.

== Early life ==
Bernard Buffet was born in 1928 in Paris, where he spent his childhood. He was from a middle-class family with roots in Northern and Western France. His mother often took him to the Louvre Museum, where he became familiar with the works of Realist painters. Buffet identified Gustave Courbet as his primary model, later paying homage to him in his 1955 canvas D'après Le Sommeil (Courbet). He also drew structural and thematic inspiration from other museum masters: the rigorous drawing and monumental history compositions of Baron Antoine-Jean Gros (the subject of Buffet's 1954 essay "The Lesson of J.-A. Gros"), the austere portraiture of Diego Velázquez, the circus motifs and spatial arrangements of Edgar Degas, and the visceral carcass still lifes of Chaïm Soutine.

Bernard Buffet was a student at the Lycée Carnot during the German occupation of Paris. He travelled to drawings courses in the evenings despite the curfew imposed by the Nazi authorities. He then studied art at the École Nationale Supérieure des Beaux-Arts (National School of the Fine Arts) and worked in the studio of the painter Eugène Narbonne. During this formative period, his circle included student peers such as Maurice Boitel, Louis Vuillermoz, and Walter Spitzer, while he became acquainted with the painter Marie-Thérèse Auffray and absorbed the severe, elongated figurative style of Francis Gruber.

Buffet's mother, Blanche, died from breast cancer in 1945. Seventeen-year-old Buffet was devastated. Art historians and biographers have cited her early death as an enduring catalyst for the existential melancholy, ascetic figures, and memento mori motifs that characterized his postwar output.

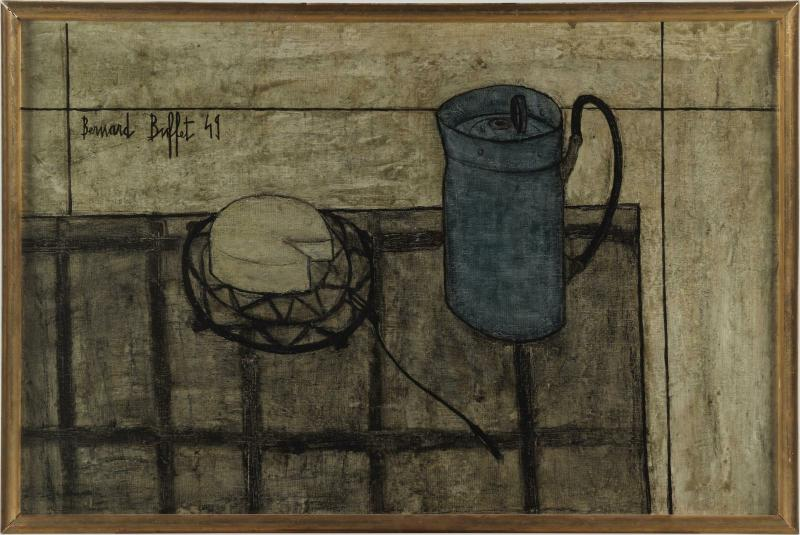
Still Life with Cheese and Pitcher (1949) - Bernard Buffet at Centre Pompidou

== Rise to fame ==
As a painter, Buffet produced religious pieces, landscapes, portraits and still lifes. Influenced by Francis Gruber, he often painted "Miserabilist" scenes of despair, including scenes of poverty and Holocaust victims, but he also portrayed subjects as varied as ashtrays, clowns, and table lamps. His work was characterized by thick black lines, elongated forms, and a lack of depth of field.

In 1946, he had his first painting shown, a self-portrait, at the Salon des Moins de Trente Ans at the Galerie Beaux-Arts. In 1948, he won his first major prize, the Prix de la Critique, sharing it with fellow Expressionist Bernard Lorjou. In the late 1940s, Buffet was a founding member of the anti-abstraction group L'Homme-Témoin ('The Witness-Man'). The group championed figurative art as a means of bearing witness to post-war alienation and anxiety.

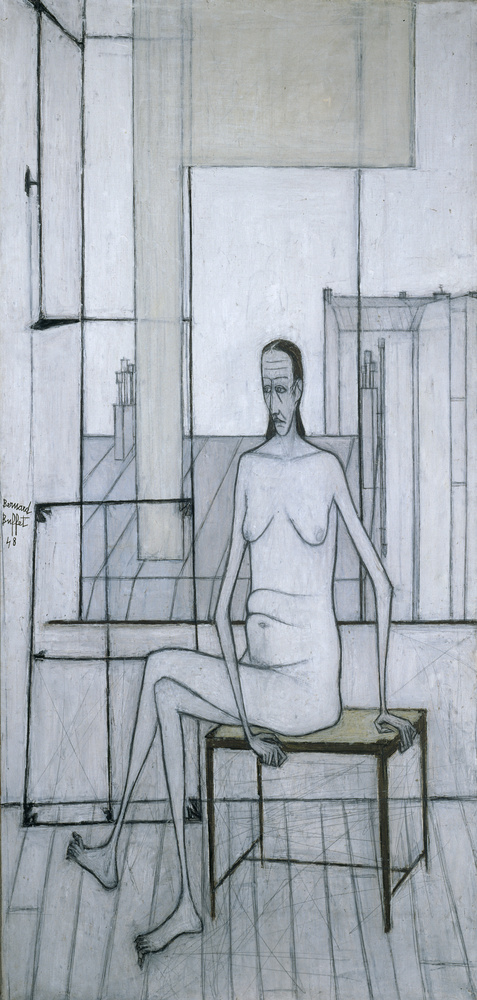
Le Grand Nu blanc (1948), LaM

An extremely prolific painter, he had at least one major exhibition every year. By the age 26, it was said that he had completed more paintings than Pierre-Auguste Renoir's lifetime output. In 1948, gallerist Maurice Garnier began showing Buffet's work, and by 1977, his gallery was devoted solely to Buffet. During this period, Buffet also attracted the patronage of the prominent modern art collector Dr. Maurice Girardin. As a testament to his belief in the young artist, Girardin purchased thirty of Buffet's paintings between 1948 and 1951, which were eventually bequeathed to the Musée d'Art Moderne de Paris.

By the age of 21, Buffet was already considered one of the greatest stars of the art world, frequently compared to Pablo Picasso. In the 1950s, Buffet's public visibility led to frequent requests for autographs, including an occasion at a Cannes restaurant where Pablo Picasso's children, Claude and Paloma, approached Buffet for his signature in their father's presence. A 1958 article in The New York Times called him one of the "Fabulous Five" cultural figures of post-war France (the other four were Brigitte Bardot, Françoise Sagan, Roger Vadim, and Yves Saint Laurent).

Buffet illustrated Les Chants de Maldoror written by Comte de Lautréamont in 1952. In 1955, he was awarded the first prize by the magazine Connaissance des Arts, which named the ten best post-war artists. In 1956, at the 28th Venice Biennale, the French pavilion featured a dedicated solo room showcasing Bernard Buffet's signature figurative style. In 1958, at the age of 30, the first retrospective of his work was held at the Galerie Charpentier, which generated over 100,000 visitors.

He was commissioned to make the portrait of Charles de Gaulle for the 1958 Time Man of the Year magazine cover.

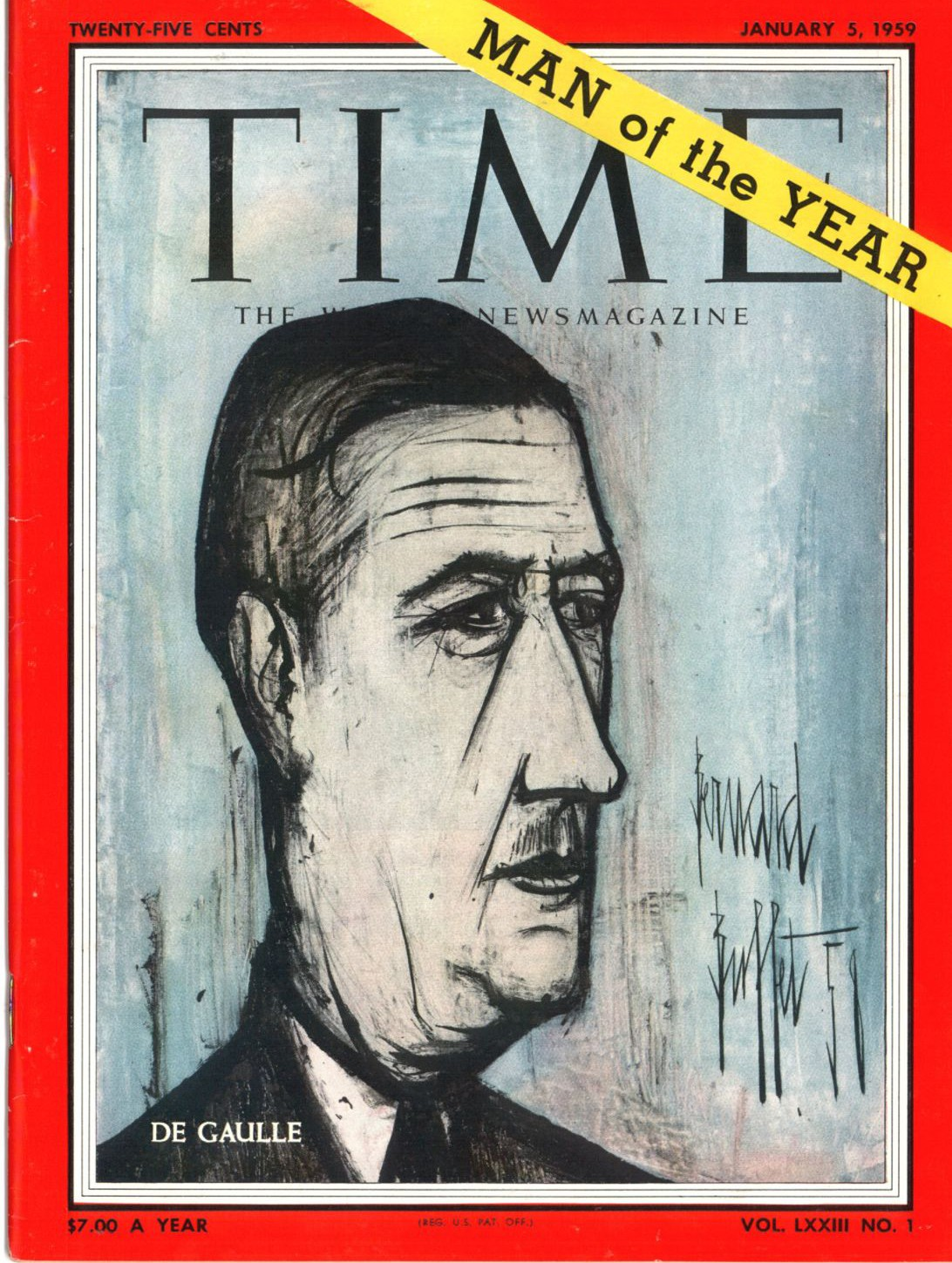
Charles de Gaulle by Buffet

== Later career ==
By the end of the 1950s, both the public and the art world had turned against Buffet. His lavish lifestyle—including a Rolls-Royce with a chauffeur and a private castle in Provence—made him seem out of touch with the still-struggling economy of post-war France, which he had memorably portrayed in his early paintings. A 1956 magazine photograph of Buffet being helped into his car by the chauffeur was a particular turning point in the public's views of him. A February 1956 photo-essay in Paris Match and a July 1956 cover story in Der Spiegel labeling him "The Man with the Golden Arm" solidified his media image as the "painter of misery in a Rolls-Royce."

Influential intellectuals and critics, including André Chastel and Roland Barthes, subsequently dismissed his work as mannered, repetitive, and commercially driven, ending his standing among the Parisian cultural avant-garde. Curator Éric Troncy later compared the art-world backlash against Buffet's extensive merchandising (including tableware, prints, and posters) to the critical opprobrium faced by Victor Vasarely for designing Decaux street furniture and Georges Mathieu for designing the French 10-franc coin. Pablo Picasso further worsened Buffet's reputation by publicly denigrating his work, while existentialist philosopher Jean-Paul Sartre denounced what he viewed as the commodification of existential despair by fashionable "pseudo-existentialists." Following the appointment of André Malraux as Minister of Cultural Affairs in 1959, the French state officially prioritized lyrical abstraction and the School of Paris, effectively excluding Buffet from French state acquisitions, museum programming, and official international exhibitions for several decades.

Despite his reduced reputation, Bernard Buffet was named Officer of the Légion d'Honneur in 1973. On 23 November 1973, the Bernard Buffet Museum was founded by Kiichiro Okano, the owner of Suruga Bank in Surugadaira, Japan. Buffet was notably the only French artist to have a dedicated museum in Japan during his lifetime.

At the request of the French postal administration in 1978, he designed a stamp depicting the Institut et le Pont des Arts—on this occasion the Post Museum arranged a retrospective of his works.

Buffet created more than 8,000 paintings and many prints as well.

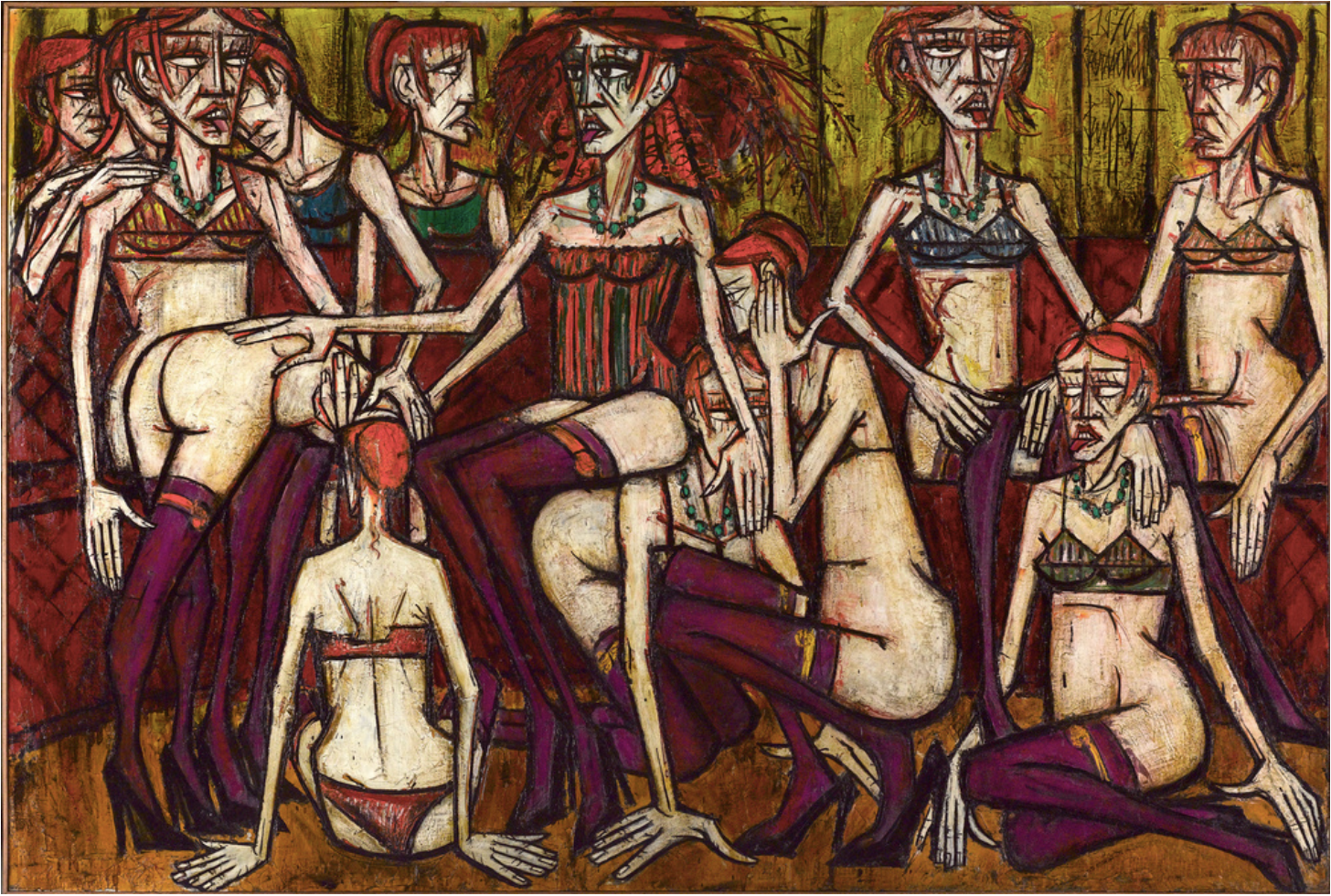
Les Folles, femmes au salon (1970), Musée d'Art Moderne de Paris

== Personal life and death ==
Buffet was bisexual, and his paintings have been noted for their homoerotic themes. Industrialist Pierre Bergé was Buffet's live-in lover for eight years from 1950 to 1958, recalling later that the two were "never apart for a single day". In 1958, Bergé left Buffet for Yves Saint Laurent. Despite the separation, Buffet drew a graphite portrait of Saint Laurent that same year (Portrait of Yves Saint Laurent, 1958), preserved in the Pierre Bergé–Yves Saint Laurent Foundation Collection.

On 12 December 1958, Buffet married the writer and actress Annabel Schwob. They adopted three children. Daughter Virginie was born in 1962; daughter Danielle, in 1963; and son Nicolas, in 1973.

Buffet died by suicide at his home in Tourtour, southern France, on 4 October 1999. He was suffering from Parkinson's disease and was no longer able to work. Police said that Buffet died after putting his head in a plastic bag attached around his neck with tape. Art historians and biographers have noted that the bag was branded with a repeating silver monogram of his own signature. In the spring of 2000, his ashes were scattered by Annabel in the gardens of the Bernard Buffet Museum in Japan, fulfilling his final wish.

== Legacy ==
American Pop artist Andy Warhol was a noted admirer of Buffet, describing him in a 1985 interview with art historian Benjamin H. D. Buchloh as his "favorite artist" and "the last big artist in Paris." Art historians and critics have extensively compared the two artists' practices, noting that Buffet prefigured Warhol's Pop methods through his comic-strip ligne claire contours, mass-market merchandise, and seamless integration of high and low culture. Art historian Barbara Carnevali contrasted Buffet's 1961 Portraits of Annabel with Warhol's 1963 Ethel Scull 36 Times, analyzing how both artists used serial repetition, heavy facial stylization, and mask-like archetypes to depersonalize their subjects. Contemporary artist Hervé Di Rosa similarly likened Buffet's encyclopedic series to Warhol's silkscreens, observing that Buffet's lifelong execution of the same graphic gestures across thousands of canvases conveyed the monotonous passage of time as conceptual artists like Roman Opałka and Yves Klein did.

In the 21st century, Buffet's oeuvre underwent an institutional and art-historical reassessment across Europe. In 2008, the Museum für Moderne Kunst in Frankfurt organized Bernard Buffet. Maler / Painter / Peintre, one of the first comprehensive exhibitions of his work in a major European contemporary art museum. In 2016, Paris's Musée d'Art Moderne held a large retrospective of his work, the first held in France since his death, though its curator acknowledged that it was a risky exhibition given Buffet's lingering reputation. Also in 2016, British author Nicholas Foulkes published Bernard Buffet: The Invention of the Modern Mega-Artist, examining his life, career, and media presence. In 2023, the Kunstmuseum Basel staged the exhibition Bernard Buffet: Existentialist and Popular Artist, drawing on the museum's Karl and Jürg Im Obersteg collection to examine the intersection of postwar existentialist imagery and commercial mass culture in his early work.

Corresponding with this renewed interest, some of Buffet's work also saw rising appraisals in the early 21st century. In 2021, his painting Les clowns musiciens, le saxophoniste (1991) sold for 16,450,000 Hong Kong dollars (~$2,098,549 USD) at Christie's auction house in Hong Kong, which set the record for the highest-selling work by the artist. In 2022, Sotheby's auction house in New York sold Buffet's La Tour Eiffel et les liliums (1988) for $1,260,000 USD, which set the second highest record of Buffet's works sold publicly.

== Selected exhibitions ==
Both during his lifetime and after his death, several renowned institutions have organized exhibitions dedicated to Buffet's work.

=== Solo exhibits ===
- 1954: Los Angeles County Museum of Art (USA)
- 1956: Venice Biennale (Italy)
- 1963: National Museum of Modern Art, Kyoto (Japan)
- 1963: National Museum of Modern Art, Tokyo (Japan)
- 1978: Postal Museum, Paris (France)
- 1991: Pushkin Museum, Moscow (Russia)
- 1991: State Hermitage Museum, Saint Petersburg (Russia)
- 1993: Musée Courbet, Ornans (France)
- 1994: Documenta-Halle, Kassel (Germany)
- 1996: Kaohsiung Museum of Fine Arts (Taiwan)
- 2006: Gemeentemuseum, The Hague (Netherlands)
- 2008: Museum für Moderne Kunst, Frankfurt (Germany)
- 2009: Centre de la Vieille Charité, Marseille (France)
- 2010: Meguro Museum of Art, Tokyo (Japan)
- 2015: Heydar Aliyev Center, Baku (Azerbaijan)
- 2017: Musée d'Art Moderne de Paris (France)
- 2019: Seoul Arts Center (South Korea)
- 2020: Bunkamura Museum of Art, Tokyo (Japan)
- 2023: Kunstmuseum Basel (Switzerland)
- 2024: Musée d'Art moderne de Fontevraud, Fontevraud-l'Abbaye (France)
- 2025: Sagawa Art Museum, Moriyama (Japan)

== Documentaries ==
- Bernard Buffet: D'ici à l'éternité (1998). Directed by Valérie Exposito. This 53-minute documentary features interviews with Buffet, his wife Annabel, and art world contemporaries, exploring his daily studio practice and personal philosophy.

== Awards ==
- 1947 Member of the Salon d'Automne
- 1947 Member of the Société des Artistes Indépendants
- 1948 co-recipient of the Prix de la Critique with Bernard Lorjou
- 1950 Prix Puvis de Chavannes
- 1955 First Prize by Magazine Connaissance
- 1956 Solo Room at the France Pavilion, 28th Venice Biennale
- 1959 Knight of the Ordre National du Mérite
- 1971 Knight of the Legion of Honour
- 1973 Officer of the Ordre National du Mérite
- 1974 Member of the Académie des Beaux-Arts
- 1993 Officer of the Légion d'Honneur

== Public collections ==
Buffet's works are held in the permanent collections of numerous museums worldwide, including:

=== Australia ===
- National Gallery of Victoria, Melbourne

=== Azerbaijan ===
- Heydar Aliyev Museum, Baku

=== Canada ===
- BAnQ (Print Collection), Montreal
- Musée national des beaux-arts du Québec, Quebec City
- National Gallery of Canada, Ottawa

=== France ===
- Centre Pompidou, Paris
- Lille Métropole Musée d'art moderne, d'art contemporain et d'art brut (LaM), Villeneuve-d'Ascq
- Musée Cantini, Marseille
- Musée d'Art moderne de Fontevraud, Fontevraud-l'Abbaye
- Musée d'Art Moderne de Paris
- Musée d'Art moderne de Troyes
- Musée Estrine, Saint-Rémy-de-Provence
- Musée National d'Art Moderne, Paris
- Palais des Beaux-Arts de Lille

=== Germany ===
- Kunsthalle Mannheim
- Neue Nationalgalerie, Berlin

=== Japan ===
- Artizon Museum, Tokyo
- Bernard Buffet Museum, Surugadaira
- Fukuoka Art Museum
- Hekinan City Tatsukichi Fujii Museum of Contemporary Art
- Hiroshima Museum of Art
- Menard Art Museum, Komaki
- Morohashi Museum of Modern Art, Fukushima
- Murauchi Art Museum, Hachiōji
- National Museum of Western Art, Tokyo
- Ohara Museum of Art, Kurashiki
- Okawa Museum of Art, Kiryū
- Otani Memorial Art Museum, Nishinomiya City
- Sagawa Art Museum, Moriyama
- Yamagata Museum of Art

=== Taiwan ===
- Ju Ming Museum, New Taipei City

=== Russia ===
- Hermitage Museum, Saint Petersburg

=== Switzerland ===
- Kunstmuseum Basel

=== United Kingdom ===
- Tate, London
- Victoria and Albert Museum, London

=== United States ===
- Art Institute of Chicago
- Bryn Mawr College Special Collections
- Carnegie Museum of Art, Pittsburgh
- Davis Museum and Cultural Center, Wellesley
- Harvard Art Museums (including the Fogg Museum), Cambridge
- Hirshhorn Museum, Washington D.C.
- Hood Museum of Art, Hanover
- Museum of Fine Arts, Houston
- Museum of Modern Art, New York
- National Portrait Gallery, Washington, D.C.
- National Gallery of Art, Washington, D.C.
- Picker Art Gallery, Hamilton
- Rhode Island School of Design Museum, Providence
- Seattle Art Museum
- Smithsonian American Art Museum, Washington, D.C.
- The Nelson-Atkins Museum of Art, Kansas City
- The Metropolitan Museum of Art, New York City
- Worcester Art Museum

=== Vatican City ===
- Vatican Museums
