= Bernard Lorjou =

French painter

- Born: 9 September 1908; Blois, France
- Died: 26 January 1986 (aged 77); Saint-Denis-sur-Loire, France
- Known for: painting, drawing, printmaking, sculpture
- Notable work: The Wildcat Hunt (1948); The Atomic Age (1949) The Massacres of Rambouillet (1957)
- Movement: Expressionism, Homme Temoin
- Awards: Prix de la Critique, 1948; First Prize at the Venice Biennial, 1952

Bernard Lorjou (9 September 1908 – 26 January 1986) was a French painter of Expressionism and a founding member of the anti-abstract art Group "L'homme Témoin".

== Early life ==
Lorjou was born in Blois, in the Loir-et-Cher department of France, in 1908, the youngest of 3 children. Born to an impoverished family just before World War I, Lorjou was to receive the bulk of his education, as he put it, "in the streets." At the age of 13, with his desire to learn to paint, he left his home for Paris. There, Lorjou lived through early years of hardship and often found himself sleeping in metros and the Gare d'Orsay while working without pay as an errand boy for a printing house.

He eventually found a position as a designer at the silk house Ducharne where he met his future wife Yvonne Mottet, also an artist and painter. Lorjou found success as a silk designer. Over the next 30 years, his designs not only adorned the bodies of many of the world's most prominent women but also provided him an income that allowed him to paint on a full-time basis.

== Painting ==
During travels through Spain in 1931, he was struck by the expressive strong styles of the artists El Greco, Velasquez, and most of all Goya. Inspired by Goya, Lorjou began painting socio-political events.

In 1942, at the Salon des Indépendants, Lorjou exhibited his work for the first time. He held his first solo exhibition in 1945 at the Galerie du Bac. In 1946, he appeared in an exhibition with Georges Rouault, Chaïm Soutine, and James Ensor.

In 1948, he shared the Critic’s Award with Bernard Buffet. In the same year, with art critic Jean Bouret, Lorjou formed the art group "l’Homme Temoin" with art critic Jean Bouret by declaring that "man is an eater of red meat, fried potatoes, fruit and cheese". The group banded together in an effort to defend figurative painting against the abstract movement and would eventually attract other painters such as Bernard Buffet, Jean Couty, André Minaux, Robert Charazac, and Simone Dat.

Over the next 30 years, Lorjou’s reputation as a painter became more established, though his style went through a series of transformations. Lorjou was supported by prominent art figures like Georges Wildenstein and Domenica Walter, the widow of Paul Guillaume. In 1969, he created a series of paintings about the murder of Sharon Tate by members of the Manson Family. His exhibition of these paintings toured through France, Belgium, and Japan.

On 26 January 1986, at the age of 77, Lorjou died from an acute asthma attack at his home in Saint-Denis-sur-Loire.

Lorjou’s body of work includes thousands of paintings, a collection wood engravings, ceramic and bronze sculptures, lithographs, illustrated books, socially oriented posters, stained glass windows, and murals.

== Theme exhibitions (selection) ==
- 1945 The Miracle of Lourdes
- 1949 The Atomic Age
- 1952 The Plague in Beauce
- 1953 Morning of the Coronation
- 1956 The Billy goat and the Harlequin
- 1957 The Massacres of Rambouillet
- 1958 The Novel of the Fox
- 1959 The Insane's Ball
- 1963 Floating Exhibition on Seine River
- 1964 Blacks and Whites
- 1965 Centaurs and Motorcycles
- 1967 Famine in India
- 1970 The Assassination of Sharon Tate
- 1971 The Sacred Sex
- 1971 The Death of Mishima
- 1972 Burned Wood Sculptures
- 1974 The Canard Enchainé Affair
- 1975 The Circus of Violence
- 1976 Bullfights, small formats
- 1980 The Dog Eaters
- 1985 AIDS

== Commissioned works ==
- 1966 Ceiling of the African room at the Museum of Hunting and Nature, Paris
- 1967 Series of sacred art murals titled "The Parables" in a Blois chapel commissioned by the Bishop of Blois
- 1967 Civic Trophy commissioned by the Center for Civic Information
- 1978 European Civic Trophy commissioned by the Center for Civic Information
- 1984 Stained Glass Window for a chapel in Blois commissioned by the Bishop of Blois

== See also ==
- Un Regard de Lumière, Lorjou, a 1983 film by Olivier Girard
