= Yasu River =

Coordinates: 35°07′24″N 135°58′25″E

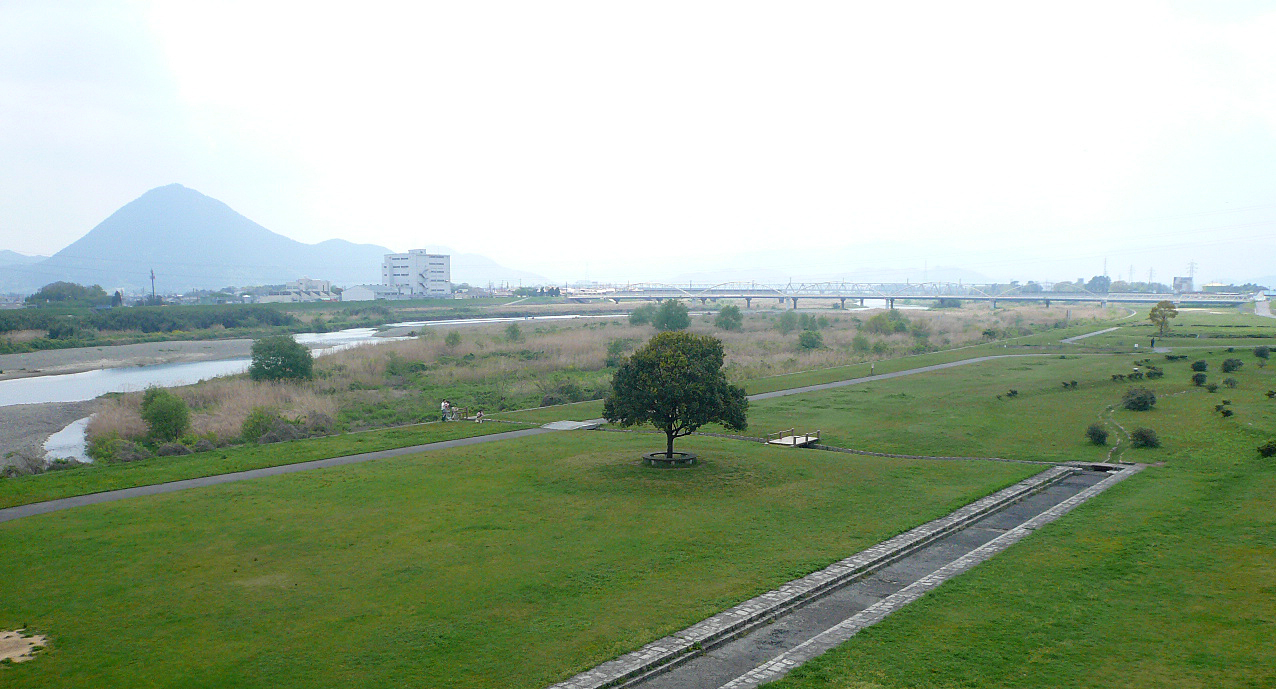
- A riverside park along the Yasu River between Moriyama and Yasu.

- Location within Japan
- Native name: 野洲川 (Japanese)

Location
- Country: Japan

Physical characteristics
- Source
  - location: Suzuka Mountains
- Mouth
  - location: Lake Biwa
- Length: 65.25 km (40.54 mi)
- Basin size: 387 km^{2} (149 sq mi)

Basin features
- River system: Yodo River

The Yasu River (野洲川, Yasu-gawa) is located in Shiga Prefecture, Japan; it is the largest river to flow into Lake Biwa.

== Geography ==
The Yasu river rises from Mount Gozaisho and flows through Kōka, Konan, Rittō, Moriyama and Yasu. It forked at the lower reaches and made a delta region, but the various forks were combined in 1979.

== History ==
The Tōkaidō, one of the Edo Five Routes which connected east and west Japan during the Edo period, paralleled the river. Post towns along the river included Tsuchiyama-juku, Minakuchi-juku and Ishibe-juku.

The Yasu River also crossed the Nakasendō, another one of the Edo Five Routes, separating Moriyama-juku and Musa-juku.
