= Saint-Denis-sur-Loire =

- Commune
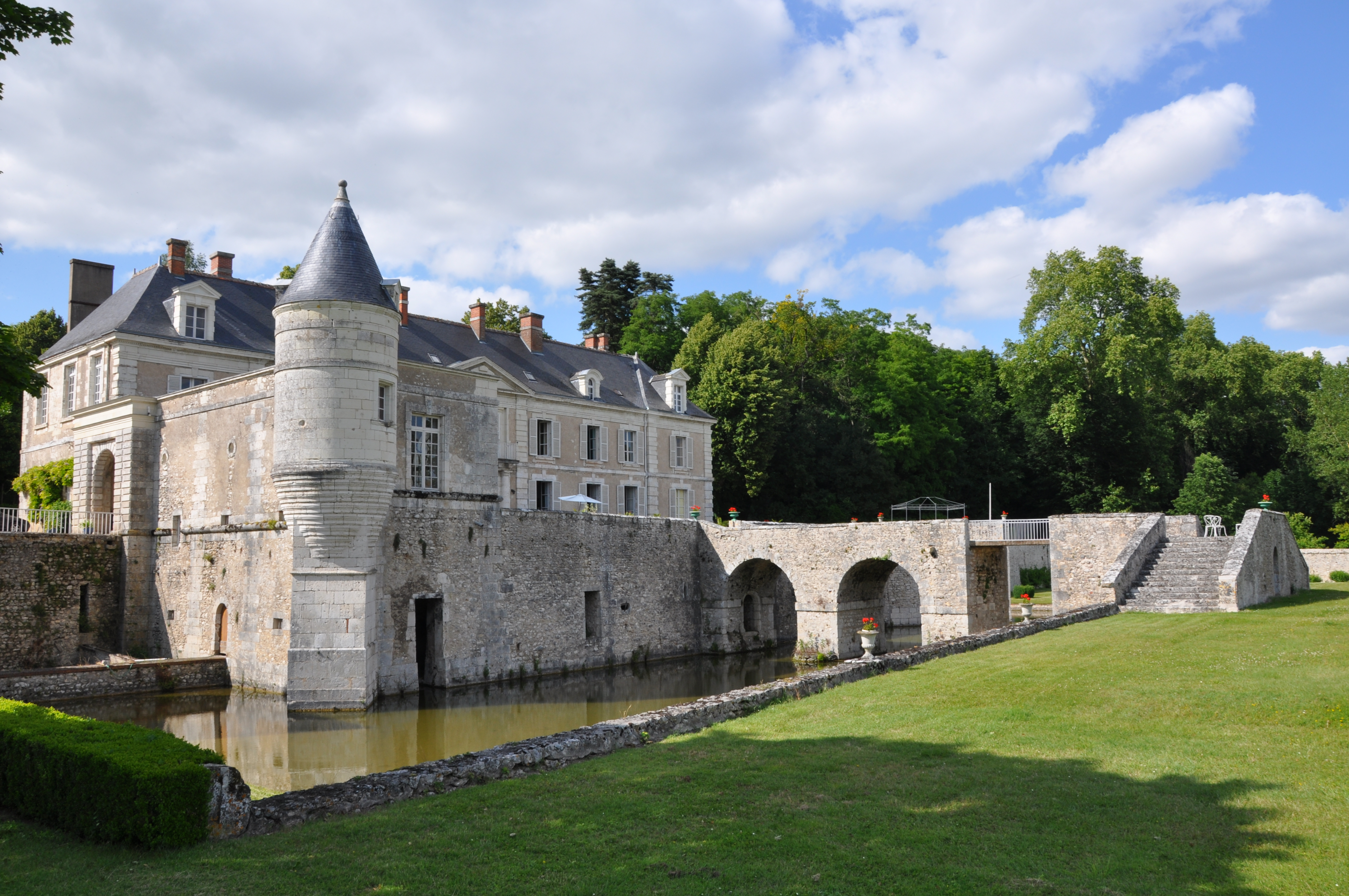
- Castle of Saint-Denis-sur-Loire
- Location of Saint-Denis-sur-Loire
- Location within France Location within Centre-Val de Loire
- Coordinates: 47°37′33″N 1°23′14″E
- Country: France
- Region: Centre-Val de Loire
- Department: Loir-et-Cher
- Arrondissement: Blois
- Canton: Blois-2
- Intercommunality: CA Blois Agglopolys

Government
  - Mayor (2020–2026): Patrick Menon
- Area^{1}: 12.4 km^{2} (4.8 sq mi)
- Elevation: 120 m (390 ft)
- Highest elevation: 115 m (377 ft)
- Lowest elevation: 69 m (226 ft)
- Population (2023): 904
  - Density: 72.9/km^{2} (189/sq mi)
- Time zone: UTC+01:00 (CET)
  - Summer (DST): UTC+02:00 (CEST)
- INSEE/Postal code: 41206 /41000
- ^{1} French Land Register data, which excludes lakes, ponds, glaciers > 1 km^{2} (0.386 sq mi or 247 acres) and river estuaries.

Saint-Denis-sur-Loire (French pronunciation: [sɛ̃ dəni syʁ lwaʁ], literally Saint-Denis on Loire) is a commune in the Loir-et-Cher department in Centre-Val de Loire, France.

It is a suburb of Blois, 7 km northeast of the town, and lies on the river Loire, 63 km southwest of Orléans.

== Population ==
Historical population
Year	Pop.	±% p.a.
1968	403	—
1975	498	+3.07%
1982	708	+5.15%
1990	907	+3.14%
1999	884	−0.28%
2007	859	−0.36%
2012	768	−2.21%
2017	837	+1.74%
2023	904	+1.29%
Source: INSEE

== See also ==
- Communes of the Loir-et-Cher department
