= Francis Gruber =

French painter

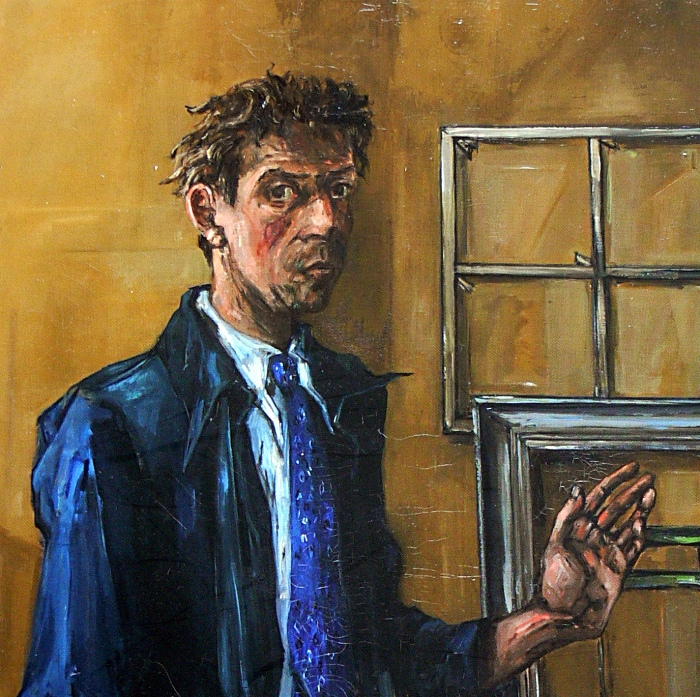
Francis Gruber Self-portrait (1942) at the Museum of Fine Arts of Nancy.

Francis Gruber (15 March 1912 – 1 December 1948) was a French painter, founder of the Nouveau Réalisme school, and a member of the Forces nouvelles group.

He was born in Nancy, France, the son of stained glass artist Jacques Gruber. He began painting at the age of 12, and he first exhibited at 18. While other artists were becoming more and more abstract, he preferred to paint human figures that were highly sculpted. He was influenced by Hieronymus Bosch and Albrecht Dürer and the Lorraine engraver Jacques Callot. In 1936, he had his first solo exhibition at the Académie Ranson. In the late 1930s, Gruber became friends with the Swiss artist Alberto Giacometti, of whom he was a neighbor.

Gruber's later work often focuses on melancholy subjects. He is credited with beginning the "Misérabiliste" movement in French painting, seen later in the work of Bernard Buffet. Politically, Gruber was a committed communist.

In the late 1930s, Gruber contracted tuberculosis. He missed military service in World War II due to this illness as his health steadily declined, and he further worsened his health with his strenuous social life. He died in Paris on 1 December 1948, having become a nationally known artistic figure.
