= Edmond Dubrunfaut =

Belgian painter

La terre en fleur by Edmond Dubrunfaut

Edmond Dubrunfaut (1920, Denain – 2007) was a Belgian painter associated with the social realism movement. Polish critic Ignacy Witz admired Dubrunfaut's depictions of miners.
