= La Chaussée-Saint-Victor =

- Commune
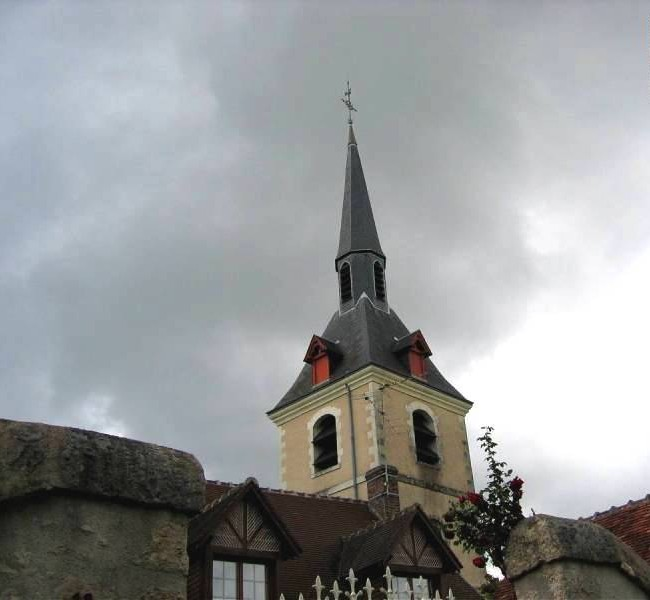
- Location of La Chaussée-Saint-Victor
- Location within France Location within Centre-Val de Loire
- Coordinates: 47°36′52″N 1°21′59″E
- Country: France
- Region: Centre-Val de Loire
- Department: Loir-et-Cher
- Arrondissement: Blois
- Canton: Blois-2
- Intercommunality: CA Blois Agglopolys

Government
  - Mayor (2021–2026): Stéphane Baudu
- Area^{1}: 6.63 km^{2} (2.56 sq mi)
- Elevation: 107 m (351 ft)
- Highest elevation: 114 m (374 ft)
- Lowest elevation: 67 m (220 ft)
- Population (2023): 4,471
  - Density: 674/km^{2} (1,750/sq mi)
- Time zone: UTC+01:00 (CET)
  - Summer (DST): UTC+02:00 (CEST)
- INSEE/Postal code: 41047 /41260
- ^{1} French Land Register data, which excludes lakes, ponds, glaciers > 1 km^{2} (0.386 sq mi or 247 acres) and river estuaries.

La Chaussée-Saint-Victor (French pronunciation: [la ʃose sɛ̃ viktɔʁ]), commonly known as La Chaussée, is a commune in the French department of Loir-et-Cher, Centre-Val de Loire.

Its inhabitants are known as Chausséens (masculine) and Chausséennes (feminine).

== Population ==
Historical population

Year	Pop.	±% p.a.
1793	731	—
1821	707	−0.12%
1846	750	+0.24%
1872	803	+0.26%
1901	819	+0.07%
1926	777	−0.21%
1946	1,170	+2.07%
1962	1,994	+3.39%
1968	2,729	+5.37%

Year	Pop.	±% p.a.
1975	3,035	+1.53%
1982	3,395	+1.61%
1990	4,036	+2.19%
1999	4,069	+0.09%
2007	4,129	+0.18%
2012	4,455	+1.53%
2017	4,503	+0.21%
2023	4,471	−0.12%

Source: EHESS and INSEE (1968-2023)

== See also ==
- Communes of the Loir-et-Cher department
