= Moriyama, Shiga =

Moriyama 守山市
- City
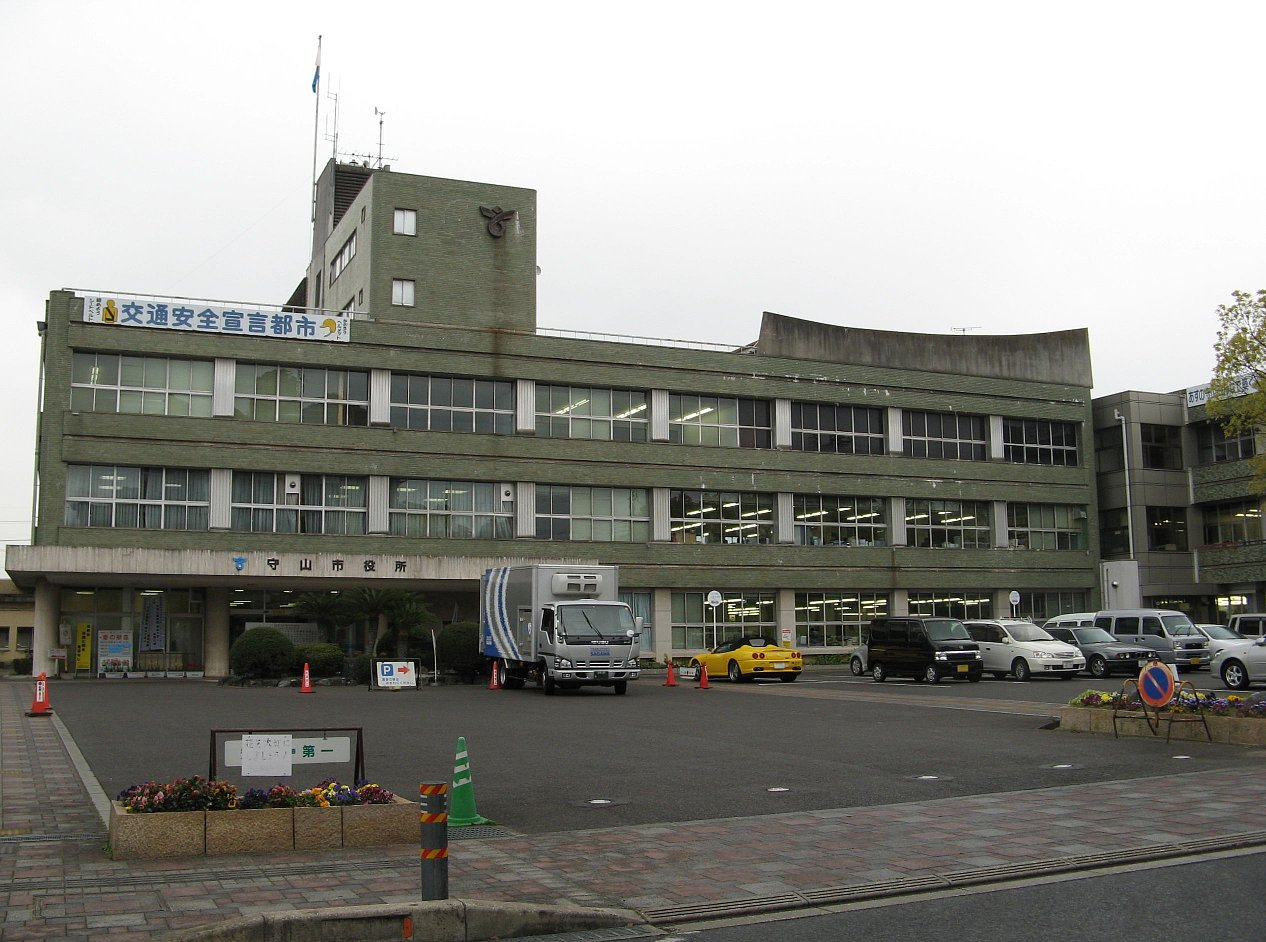
- Moriyama City Hall

- Flag Emblem

- Location of Moriyama in Shiga Prefecture

- Location in Japan
- Coordinates: 35°3′31″N 135°59′39″E
- Country: Japan
- Region: Kansai
- Prefecture: Shiga

Government
  - Mayor: Kazuhiro Miyamoto

Area
  - Total: 55.74 km^{2} (21.52 sq mi)
  - Land: 45.56 km^{2} (17.59 sq mi)
  - Water: 10.18 km^{2} (3.93 sq mi) 18.263%
- Elevation: 94.9 m (311 ft)

Population (July 31, 2022)
  - Total: 85,485
  - Density: 1,876/km^{2} (4,860/sq mi)
- Time zone: UTC+09:00 (JST)
- City hall address: 5-22, 2-chome, Yoshimi, Moriyama-shi, Shiga-ken 524-8585
- Website: Official website
- Symbols
- Flower: Nelumbo nucifera
- Tree: Cinnamomum camphora

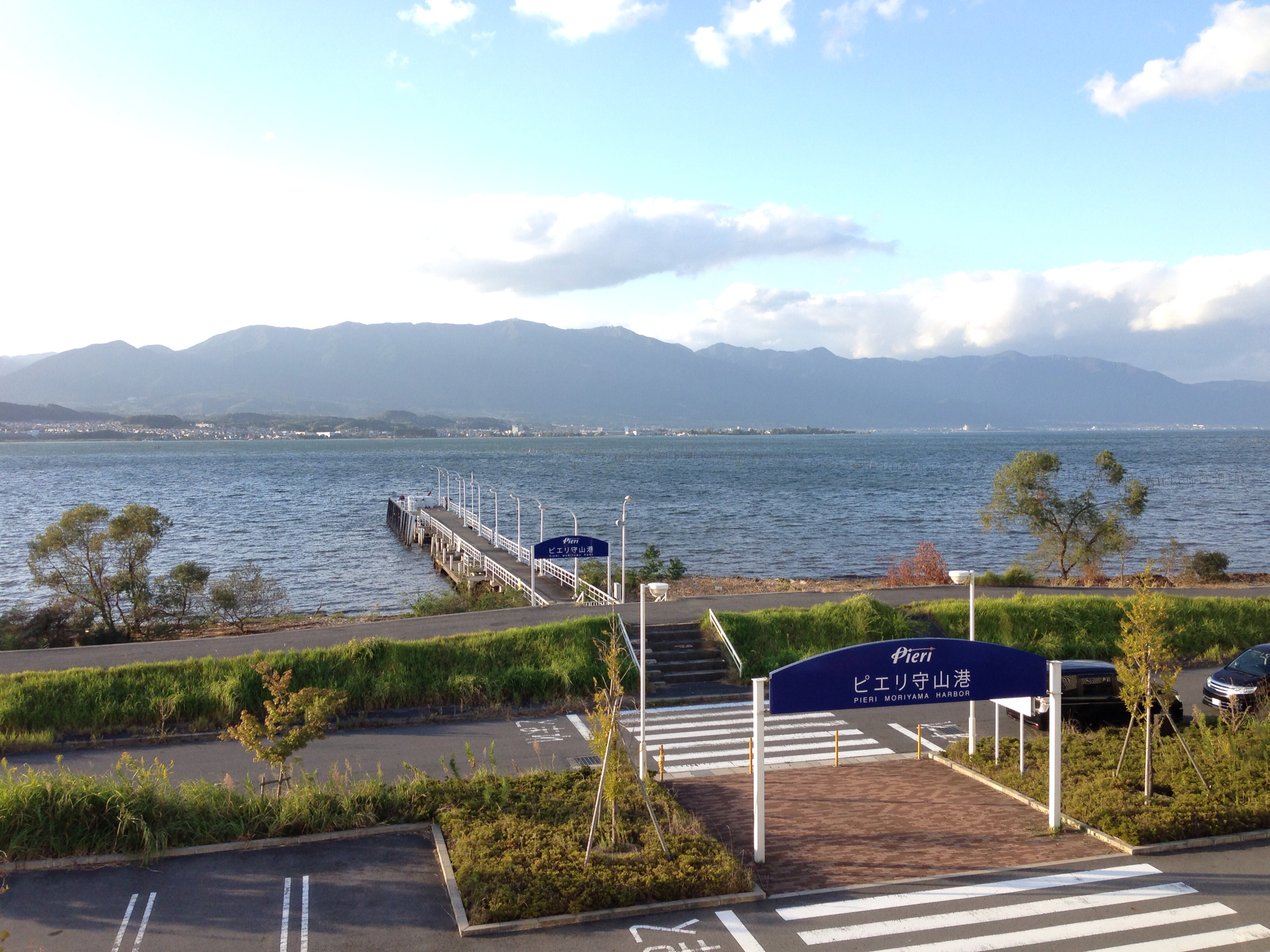
Lake Biwa from Moriyama

Moriyama (守山市, Moriyama-shi) is a city located in Shiga Prefecture, Japan. As of 31 August 2021, the city had an estimated population of 85,485 in 34,366 households and a population density of 1533.63 persons per km^{2}. The total area of the city is 55.74 square kilometres (21.52 sq mi).

== Geography ==
Moriyama is located on the south side of the alluvial fan where the Yasu River flowing from the Suzuka Mountains enters into Lake Biwa. The land is generally flat, and as with other coastal areas of Lake Biwa, it is occasionally subject to flooding of rivers and rising water levels in Lake Biwa.

=== Neighboring municipalities ===
Shiga Prefecture

- Kusatsu
- Otsu (By Lake Biwa Bridge)
- Rittō
- Yasu

=== Climate ===
Moriyama has a humid subtropical climate (Köppen Cfa) characterized by warm summers and cool winters with light to no snowfall. The average annual temperature in Moriyama is 16.4 °C. The average annual rainfall is 1603.5 mm with July as the wettest month. The temperatures are highest on average in August, at around 29.9 °C, and lowest in February, at around 6.2 °C.

== Demographics ==
Per Japanese census data, the population of Moriyama has increased steadily over the past 60 years.

Historical population
Year	Pop.	±%
1960	29,207	—
1970	34,785	+19.1%
1980	46,763	+34.4%
1990	58,561	+25.2%
2000	65,542	+11.9%
2010	76,560	+16.8%
2020	83,236	+8.7%

== History ==
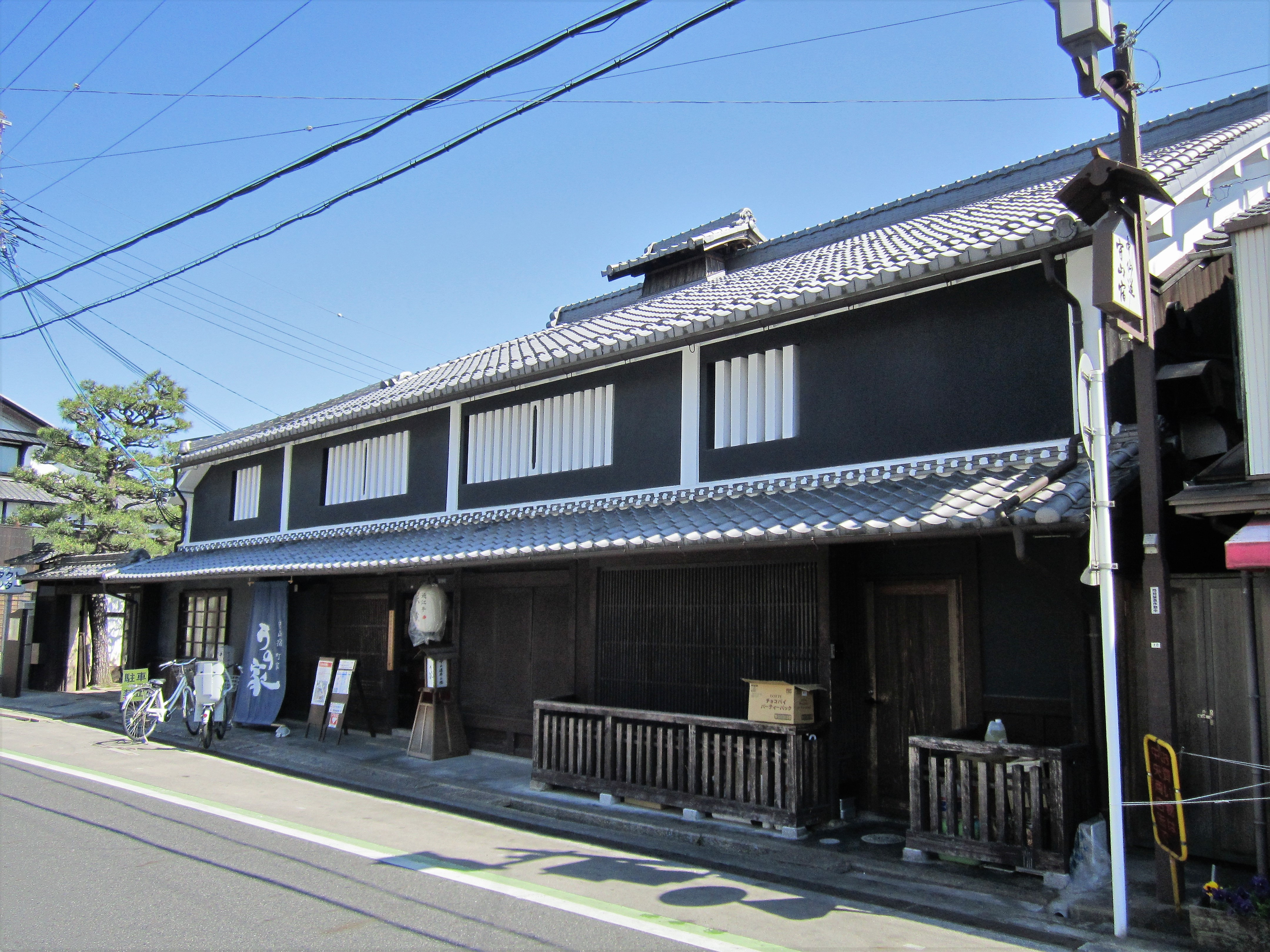
surviving building of Moriyama-juku on the Nakasendō

Moriyama is part of ancient Ōmi Province. The area contains many archaeological sites from the Jōmon and especially the Yayoi period, and the Yasu River has been a key point for east-west transportation since ancient times. It was the site of a battle in the Asuka period Jinshin War, and during the Muromachi period was the location of a villa for Shōgun Ashikaga Yoshiaki. It later became a stronghold for the Ikkō-ikki movement. During the Edo Period, Moriyama-juku prospered as a post station on the Nakasendō) highway connecting Kyoto with the eastern provinces and Edo. The area was mostly tenryō territory under the direct administration of the Tokugawa shogunate. The village of Moriyama was stablished within Yasu District, Shiga on April 1, 1889 with the creation of the modern municipalities system. It was raised to town status in 1904. Moriyama annexed neighboring Monobe Village from Kurita District in 1941 and Ozu, Tamatsu, Kawanishi and Hayano villages from Yasu district in 1955. On July 1, 1970 Moriyama was raised to city status.

The Katsube fire festival has taken place in Moriyama since the early 1200s. In 2024, women participated in the festival for the first time.

== Government ==
Moriyama has a mayor-council form of government with a directly elected mayor and a unicameral city council of 22 members. Moriyama contributes two members to the Shiga Prefectural Assembly. In terms of national politics, the city is part of Shiga 3rd district of the lower house of the Diet of Japan.

== Economy ==
Moriyama traditionally had an economy based on agriculture and some commercial fishing on Lake Biwa. Melons were (and are) a noted local product. However, due to its location and transportation connections, the population growth of the city has been primarily as a commuter town to the nearby Kyoto, Osaka and Ōtsu urban areas.

== Education ==
Moriyama has nine public elementary schools and four public middle schools operated by the city government and two public high schools operated by the Shiga Prefectural Department of Education. The prefecture also operates one public middle school and one special education school for the handicapped. There are also one private middle school and one private high school. The Kyoto-based Heian Jogakuin University (also known as St. Agnes' University) had a campus in Moriyama.

== Transportation ==
=== Railway ===
JR West – Biwako Line

- Moriyama

=== Highway ===
- National Route 477

== Sister cities ==
- Adrian, Michigan, United States, since 1989
- Gongju, South Chungcheong Province, South Korea
- Kauaʻi County, Hawaii, United States

== Local attractions ==
- Ise Site, Jōmon through Kamakura period ruins, National Historic Site
- Katsube Shrine, famous for its fire festival
- Lake Biwa
- Moriyama Firefly Museum
- Moriyama-juku on the former Nakasendō
- Sagawa Art Museum
- Shimonogō Site, Yayoi period settlement ruins, National Historic Site
