= Sagawa Art Museum =

Museum in Shiga Prefecture, Japan

Coordinates: 35°06′34″N 135°56′46″E

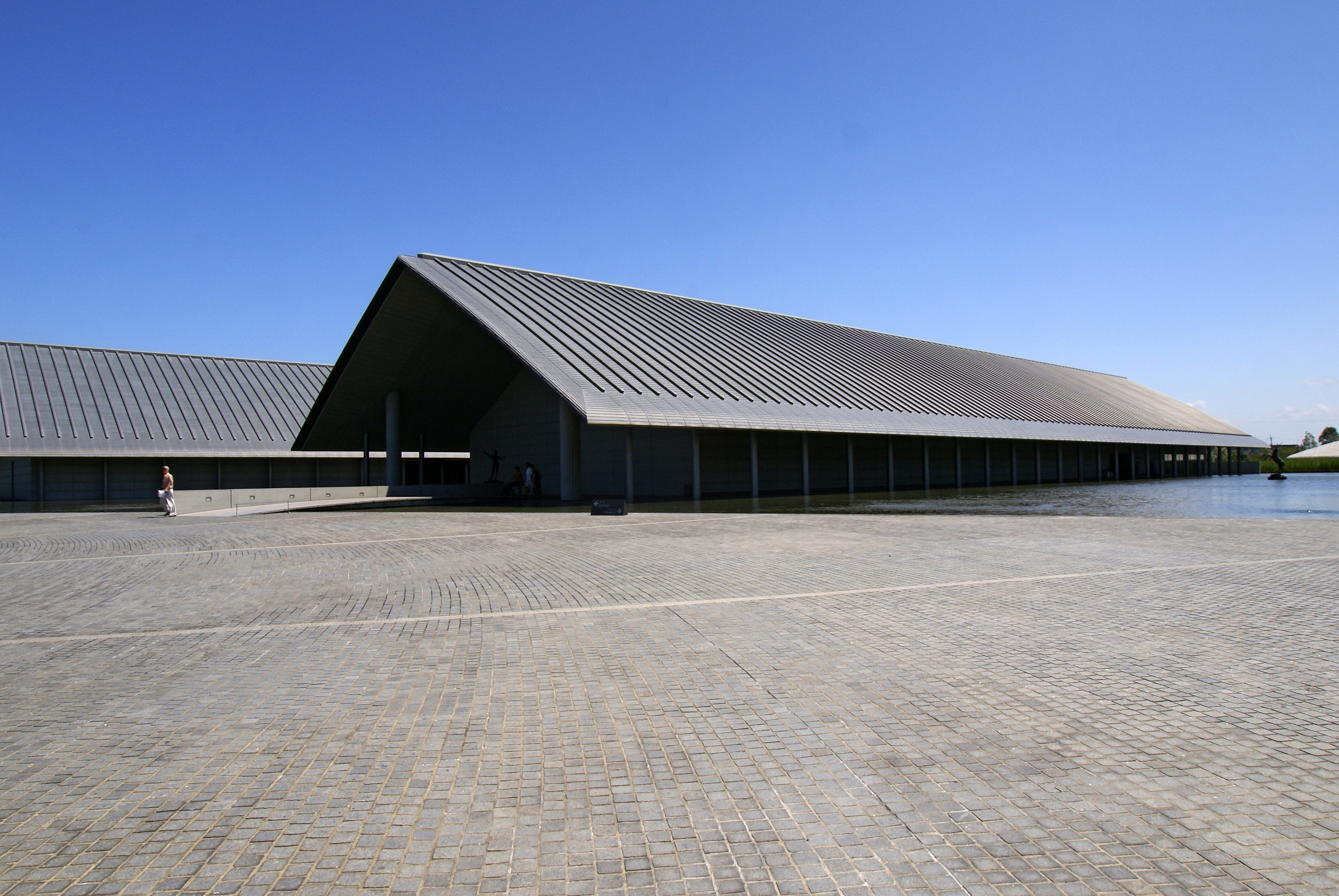
Sagawa Art Museum

Sagawa Art Museum (佐川美術館, Sagawa Bijutsukan) opened in Moriyama, Shiga Prefecture, Japan on 22 March 1998. The museum stages temporary exhibitions and houses a permanent collection which includes a bronze bell dating to 858 that has been designated a National Treasure.

== See also ==
- List of National Treasures of Japan (crafts: others)
