= Villebarou =

- Commune
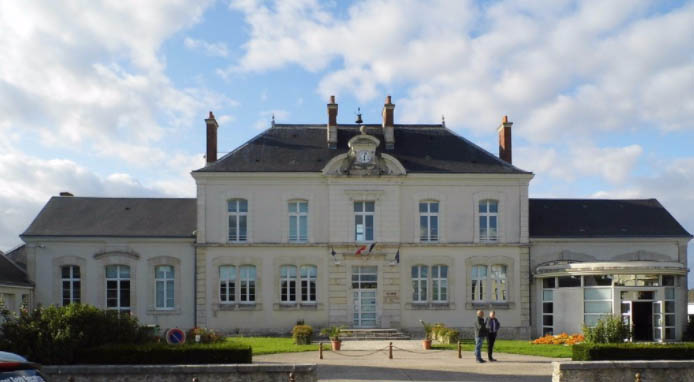
- Town hall
- Location of Villebarou
- Location within France Location within Centre-Val de Loire
- Coordinates: 47°37′24″N 1°19′27″E
- Country: France
- Region: Centre-Val de Loire
- Department: Loir-et-Cher
- Arrondissement: Blois
- Canton: Blois-2
- Intercommunality: CA Blois Agglopolys

Government
  - Mayor (2020–2026): Philippe Masson
- Area^{1}: 9.11 km^{2} (3.52 sq mi)
- Elevation: 120 m (390 ft)
- Highest elevation: 121 m (397 ft)
- Lowest elevation: 108 m (354 ft)
- Population (2023): 2,584
  - Density: 284/km^{2} (735/sq mi)
- Time zone: UTC+01:00 (CET)
  - Summer (DST): UTC+02:00 (CEST)
- INSEE/Postal code: 41276 /41000
- ^{1} French Land Register data, which excludes lakes, ponds, glaciers > 1 km^{2} (0.386 sq mi or 247 acres) and river estuaries.

Villebarou (pronounced [vilˈbaʁu]) is a commune in the Loir-et-Cher department, Centre-Val de Loire, France. It is located 3.8 km (2.4 mi) from Blois.

== History ==
Archaeological assessment suggests ancient settlement near the present-day Vendôme Route, with ceramics dating from the 1st and 2nd centuries.

== Population ==
Historical population

Year	Pop.	±% p.a.
1793	1,372	—
1821	1,208	−0.45%
1846	1,086	−0.42%
1872	1,011	−0.27%
1901	878	−0.49%
1926	702	−0.89%
1946	802	+0.67%
1962	955	+1.10%
1968	1,307	+5.37%

Year	Pop.	±% p.a.
1975	1,475	+1.74%
1982	1,573	+0.92%
1990	1,793	+1.65%
1999	1,946	+0.91%
2007	2,570	+3.54%
2012	2,569	−0.01%
2017	2,460	−0.86%
2023	2,584	+0.82%

Source: EHESS and INSEE (1968-2023)

== See also ==
- Communes of the Loir-et-Cher department
