= Chōjū-ji =

Buddhist temple in Shiga Prefecture, Japan

- 長寿寺
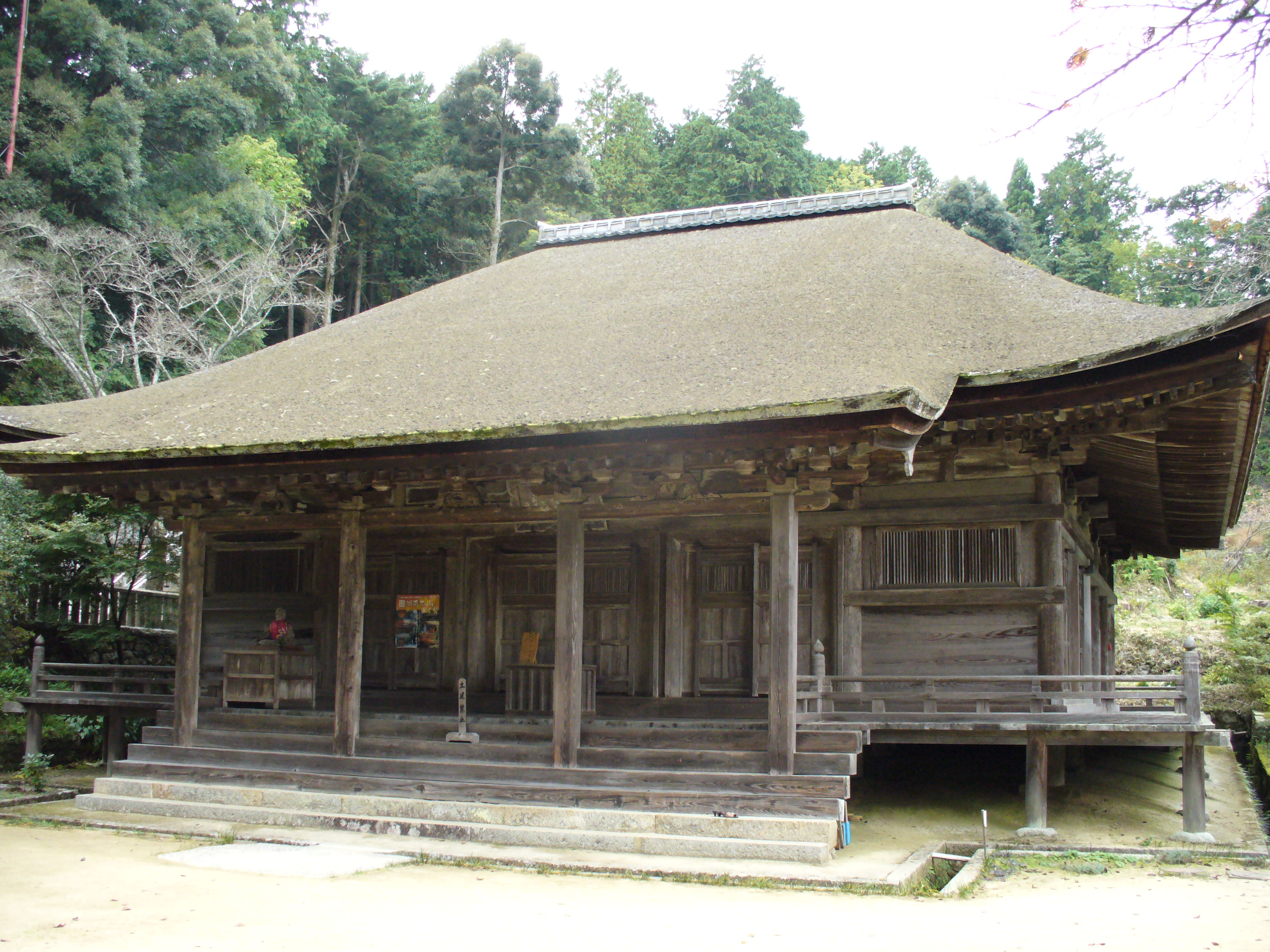
- Chōjū-ji Main Hall (NT)

- Chōjū-ji Chōjū-ji (Japan)

Religion
- Affiliation: Buddhist
- Deity: Jizō Bosatsu
- Rite: Tendai

Location
- Location: 51–1 Higashidera, Konan-shi, Shiga-ken 520-3121
- Country: Japan
- Interactive map of Chōjū-ji
- Coordinates: 34°59′7.17″N 136°3′35.62″E

Architecture
- Founder: c. Rōben
- Completed: c.729-749

Website
- Official website

Chōjū-ji (長寿寺) is a Buddhist temple in the city of Konan, Shiga Prefecture, Japan. It belongs to the Tendai school of Japanese Buddhism. Its main image is a hibutsu statue of Jizō Bosatsu. Its Hondō is a National Treasure.: It is also referred to as Higashi-dera (東寺), whereas the temple of Jōraku-ji (長寿寺) is referred to as Nishi-dera (西寺).

== History ==
The history of Chōjū-ji is uncertain, as the documentary evidence of its foundation has been lost. The temple's legend states that it was founded by Rōben at the request of Emperor Shōmu during the Tenpyō era (729–749), into order to project the spiritually vulnerable northeastern quadrant from Shigaraki Palace, and also in hopes that he would conceive an heir. In response to this, his consort gave birth to a princess, later known as Empress Kōken. The temple was a substantial establishment with 24 chapels and it was named "Chōjū-ji" as a prayer for the longevity of the princess. A statue of Jizō Bosatsu was carved by Gyōki as the temple's main image.

The Hondō was destroyed in a fire during the Jōgan period (859–877) but was soon rebuilt. The temple was patronized by Minamoto no Yoritomo in the Kamakura period and the Ashikaga clan during the Muromachi period. In the Sengoku period, Oda Nobunaga had the temple's Three-story Pagoda relocated to Sōken-ji near Azuchi Castle, where it remains to this day. The Rōmon was likewise relocated by Nobunaga to a temple called Rendai-ji in what is now Rittō, Shiga, but neither the gate nor the temple have survived.

The temple is seven-minutes by car from Ishibe Station on the JR West Kusatsu Line.

== Cultural Properties ==
- The Main Hall (Hondō) of Chōjū-ji was built towards the end of the Heian period or the start of the Kamakura period. As all documentation has been lost, the exact date is not certain. It is a five by five bay, single-story, yosemune style structure with a three-ken step canopy, and hinoki cypress bark shingled roof. The building was designated a National Treasure in 1953.
- Benten-dō; late Muromachi period (dated 1550), a one x one bay chapel

The temple also has a number of statues which are National Important Cultural Properties

- Amida Nyōrai, Heian-period
- Amida Nyōrai, Heian-period
- Shaka Nyōrai, Heian period,

== Gallery ==
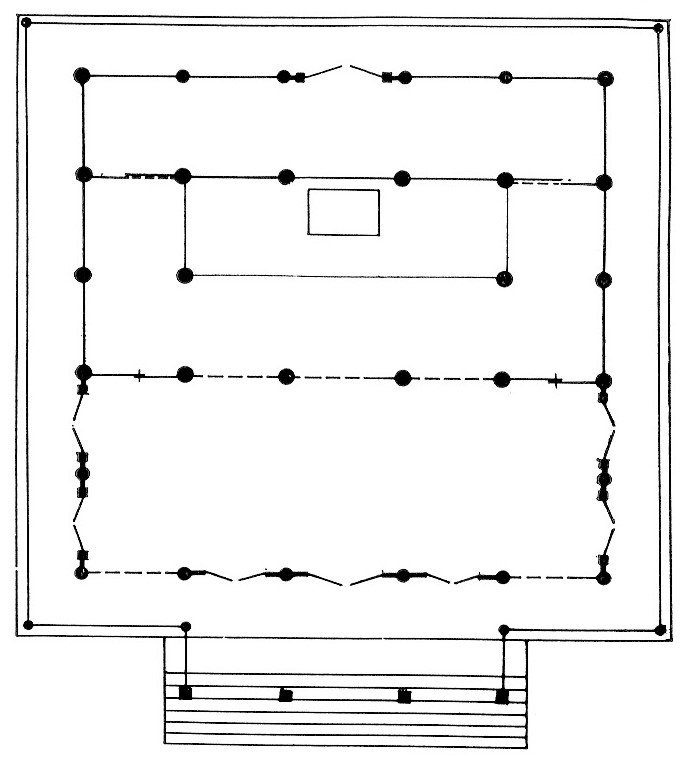
Hondō layout

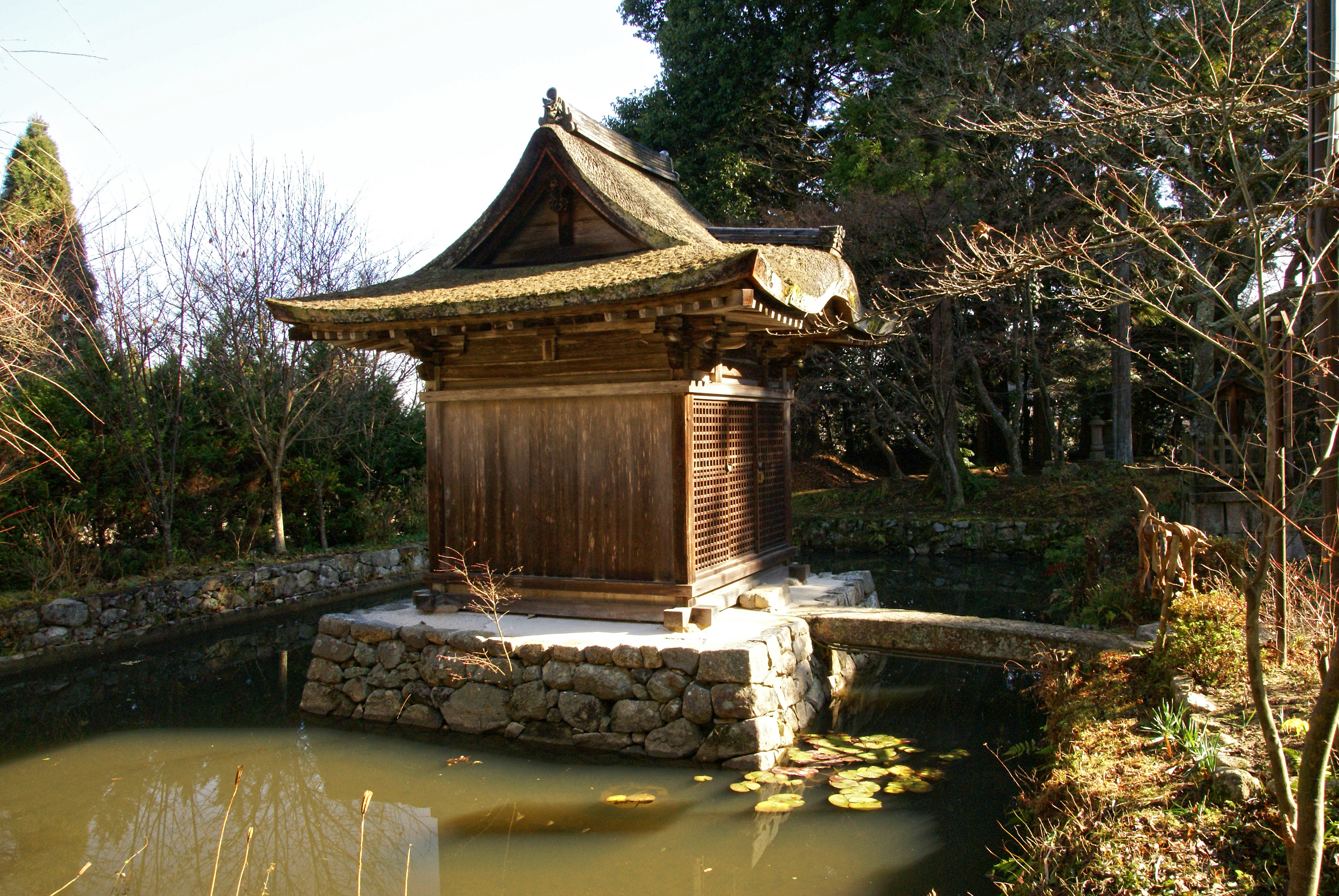
Benten-dō

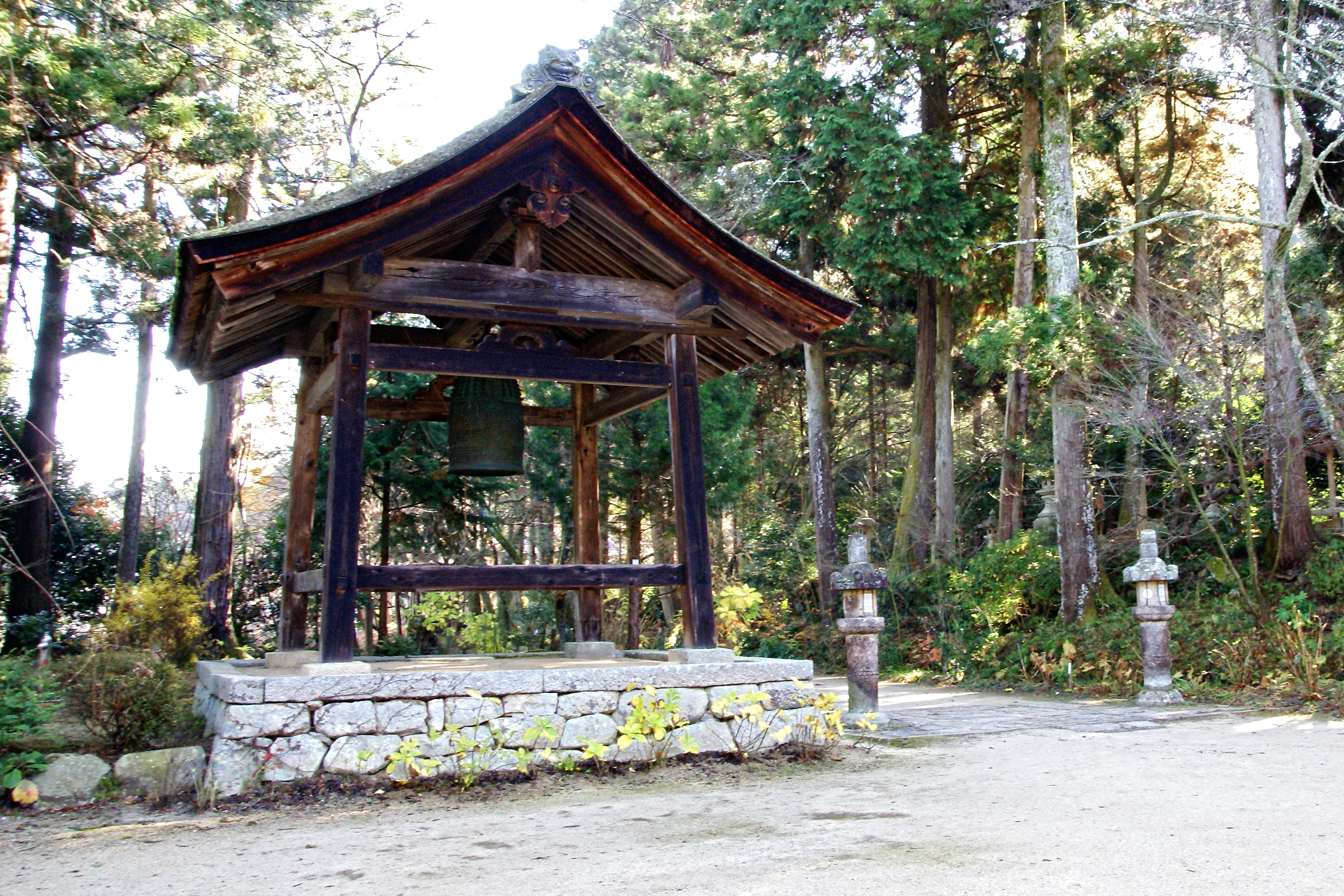
Belfry

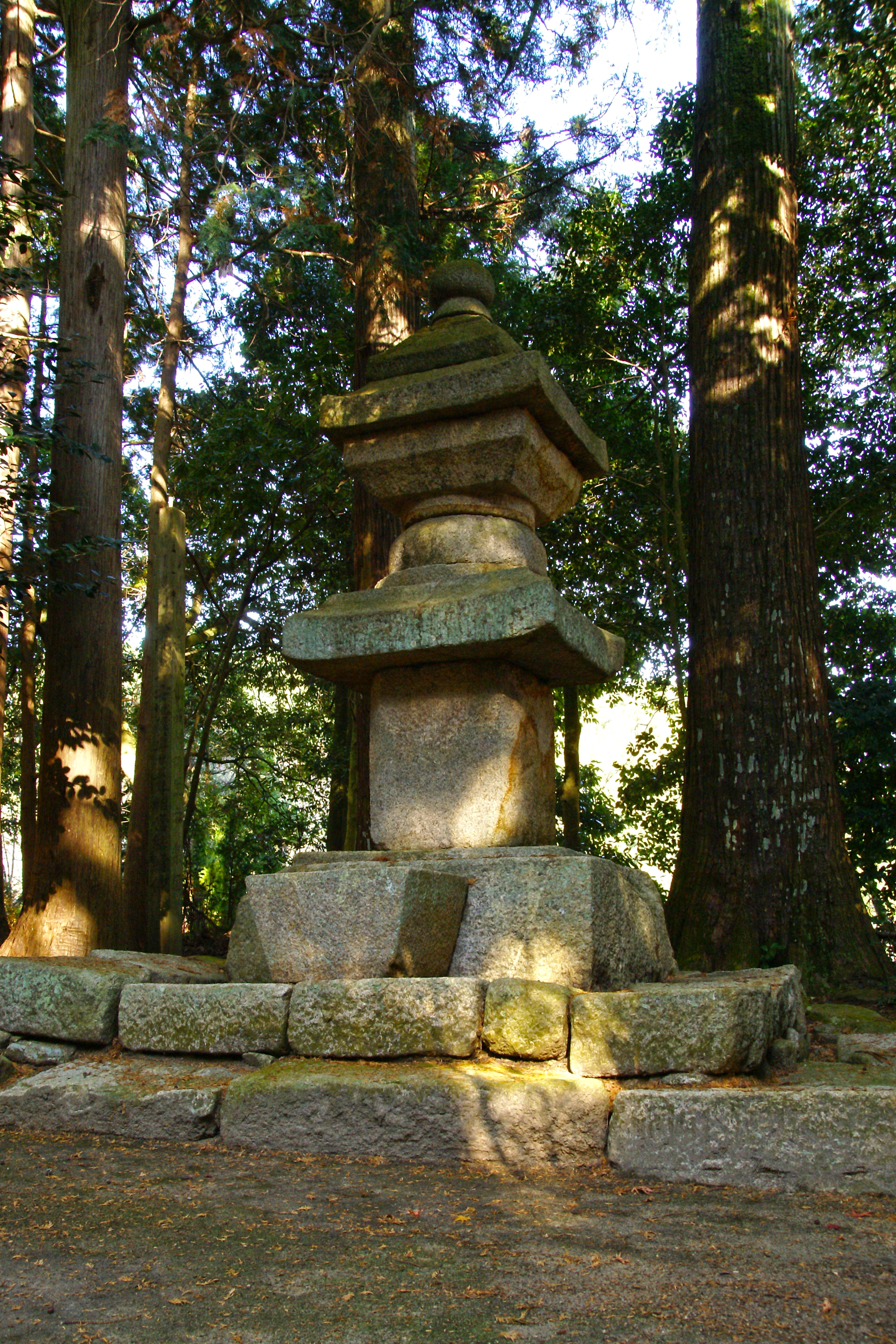
Stone Tahō-tō

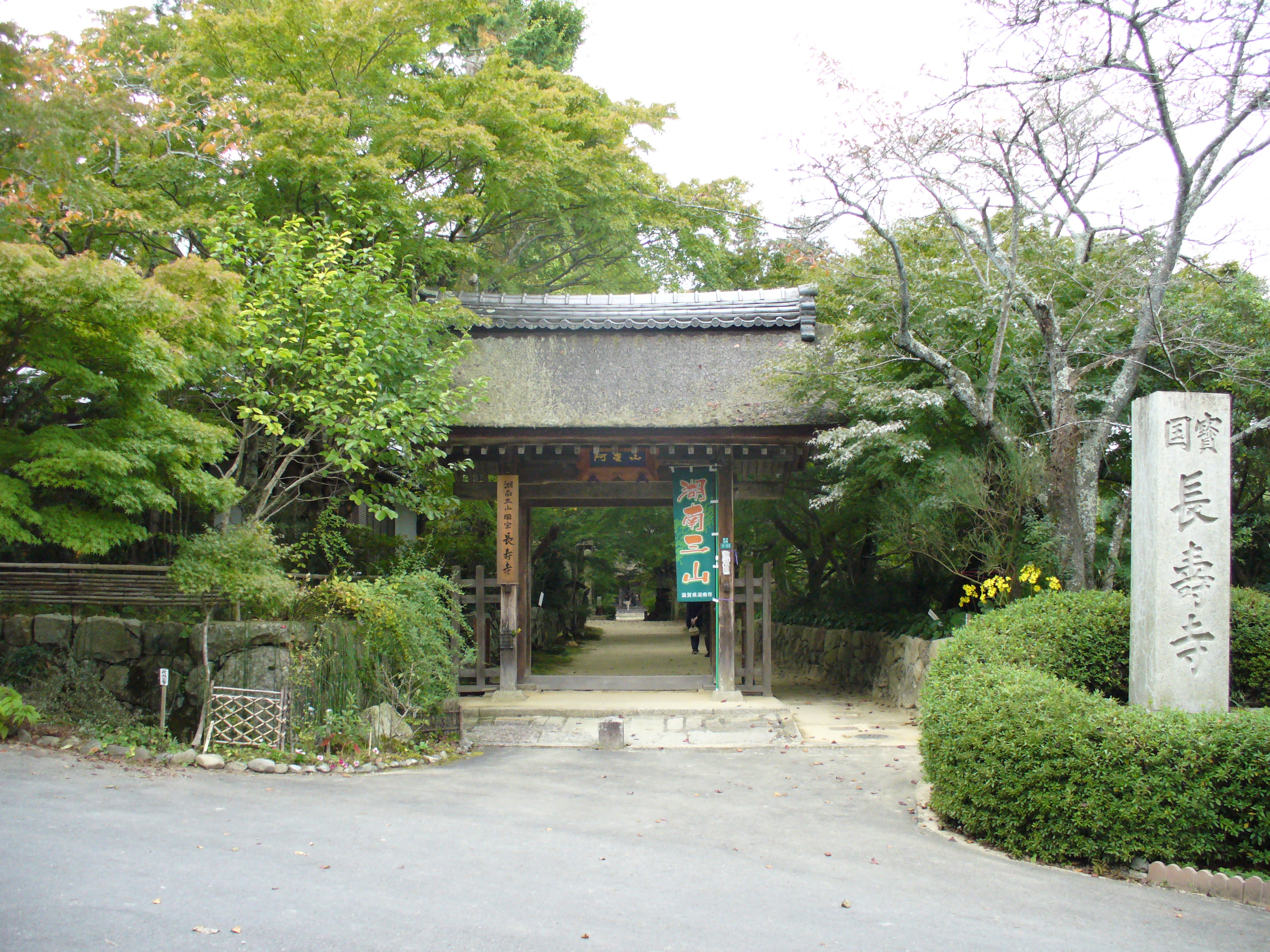
Sanmon

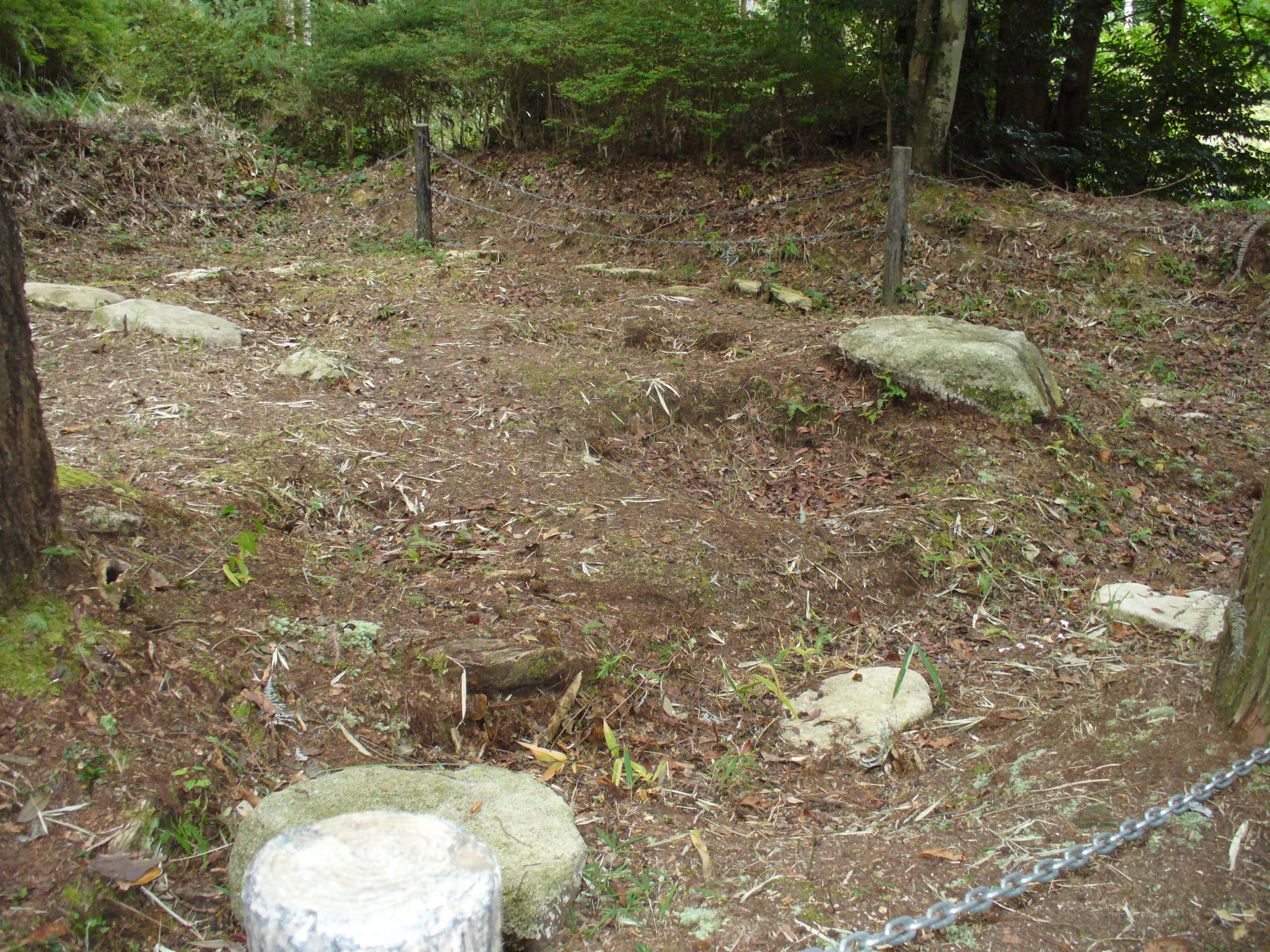
Site of Three-story Pagoda

== See also ==
- List of National Treasures of Japan (temples)
