= Kōnan Station (Shiga) =

Railway station in Kōka, Shiga Prefecture, Japan

Kōnan Station 甲南駅
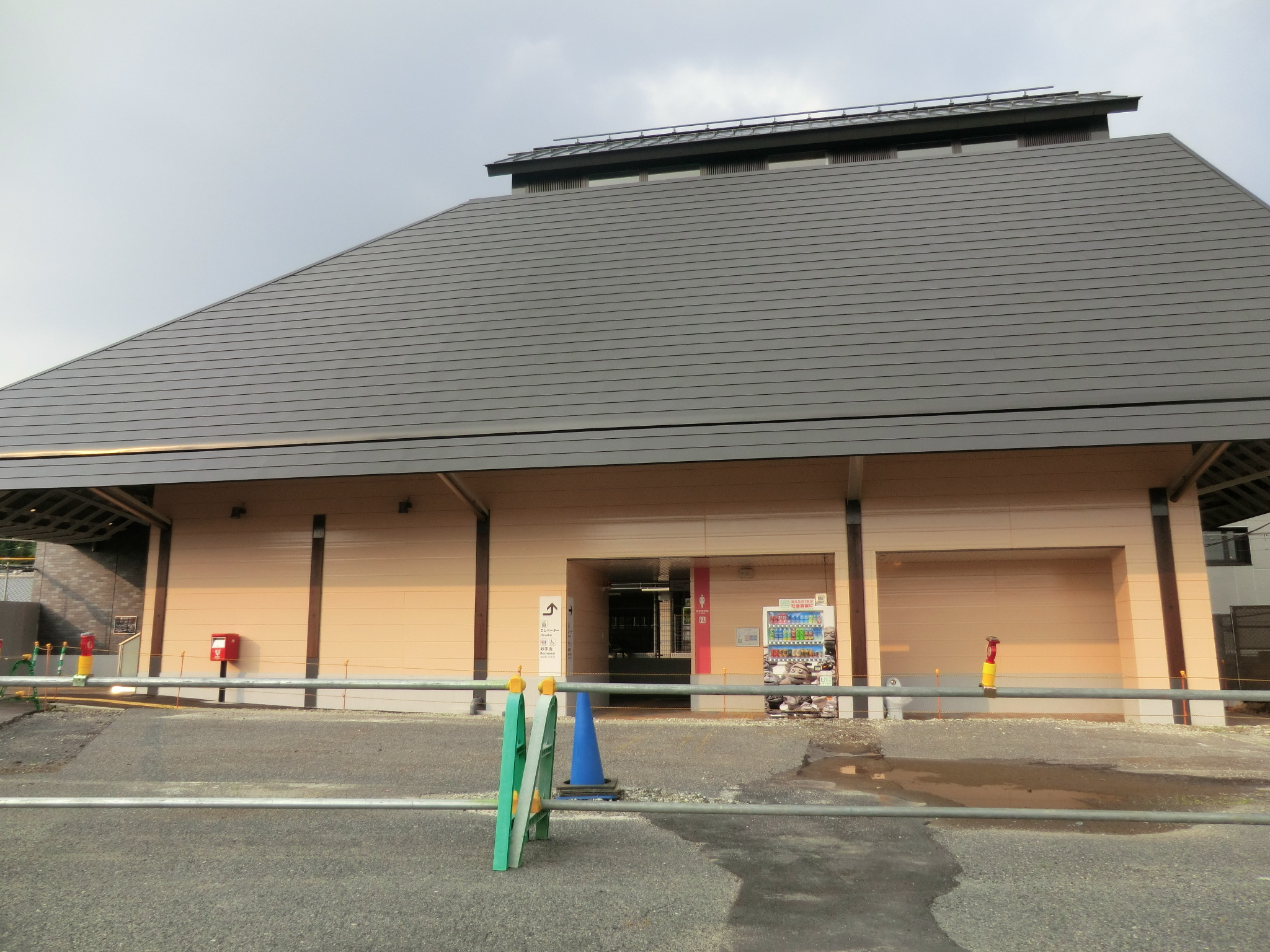
- Kōnan Station, July 2019

General information
- Location: Kōnan-chō Fukawa, Kōka-shi, Shiga-ken 520-3322; Japan
- Coordinates: 34°55′54.49″N 136°10′8.36″E
- Operator: JR West
- Line: C Kusatsu Line
- Distance: 12.5 km from Tsuge
- Platforms: 2 side platforms

Other information
- Website: Official website

History
- Opened: February 19, 1890
- Former names: Fukawa (to 1956)

Passengers
- FY 2023: 1,428 daily
Location
- Location within Shiga Prefecture Location within Japan

Kōnan Station (甲南駅, Kōnan-eki) is a passenger railway station located in the city of Kōka, Shiga Prefecture, Japan, operated by the West Japan Railway Company (JR West).

== Lines ==
Kōnan Station is served by the Kusatsu Line, and is 12.5 kilometers from the starting point of the line at Tsuge.

== Station layout ==
The station consists of two opposed side platforms connected by a footbridge. The station is staffed.

=== Platforms ===
1	■ Kusatsu Line	for Tsuge
2	■ Kusatsu Line	for Kibukawa and Kusatsu

== Adjacent stations ==
«	Service	»
Kusatsu Line
Terashō	Local	Kibukawa

== History ==
Kōnan Station opened on February 19, 1890 as Fukawa Station (深川駅, Fukawa-eki) on the Kansai Railway, which was nationalized in 1907 to become part of the Japanese Government Railway (JGR), and subsequently the Japan National Railway (JNR) . The station became Kōnan Station on April 10, 1956. The station became part of the West Japan Railway Company on April 1, 1987 due to the privatization and dissolution of the JNR.

== Passenger statistics ==
In fiscal 2019, the station was used by an average of 855 passengers daily (boarding passengers only).

== Surrounding area ==
- former Konan town hall
- Koka City Konan Daiichi Elementary School

== See also ==
- List of railway stations in Japan
