= Zensui-ji =

Tendai Buddhist temple, Japan

- 善水寺
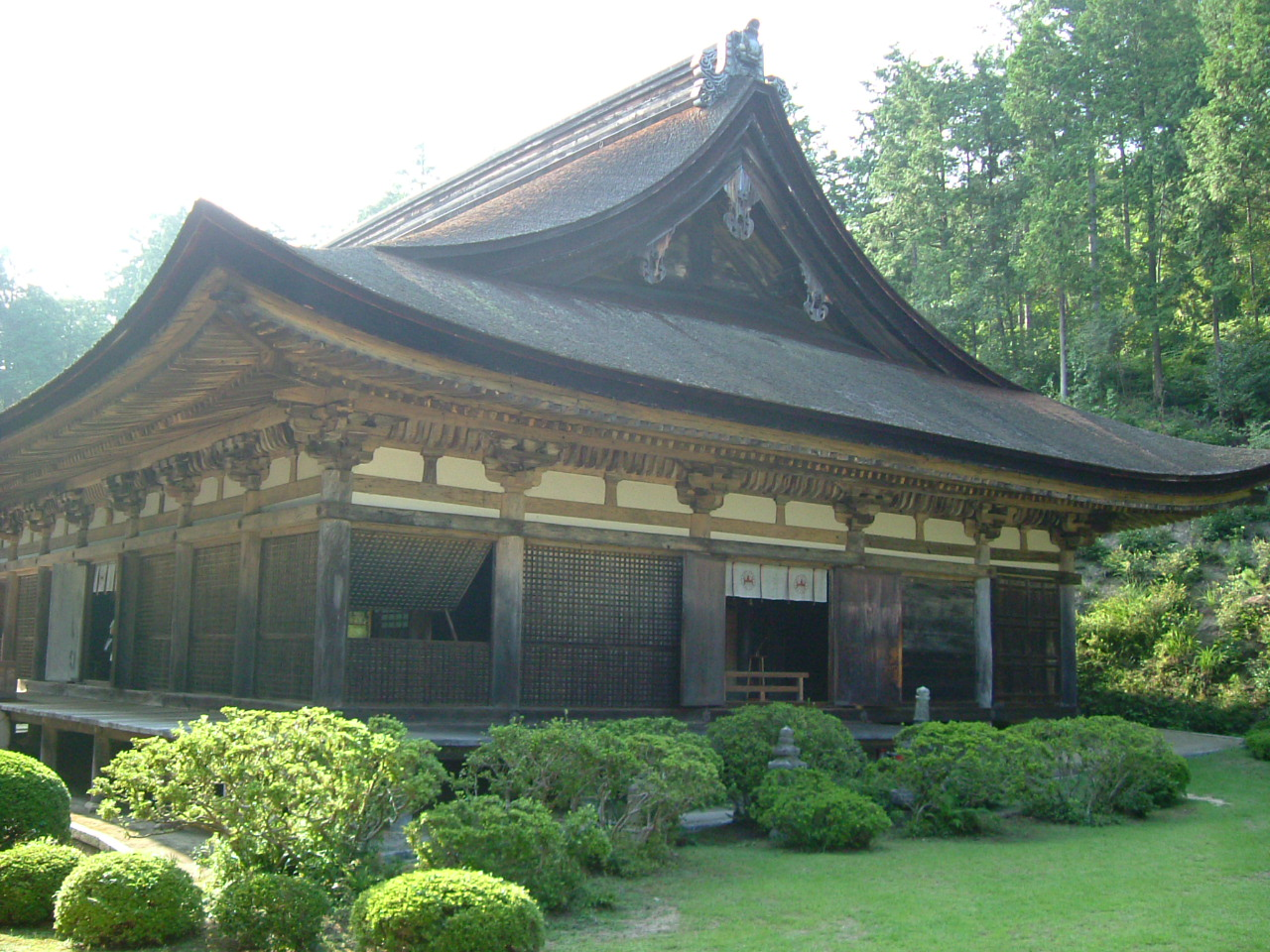
- Zensui-ji Main Hall (NT)

- Zensui-ji Zensui-ji (Japan)

Religion
- Affiliation: Buddhist
- Deity: Yakushi Nyōrai
- Rite: Tendai

Location
- Location: 3518 Iwane, Konan-shi, Shiga-ken 520-3252
- Country: Japan
- Coordinates: 35°0′23.2″N 136°6′45.2″E

Architecture
- Founder: c. Empress Genmei
- Completed: c.708-715

Website
- Official website

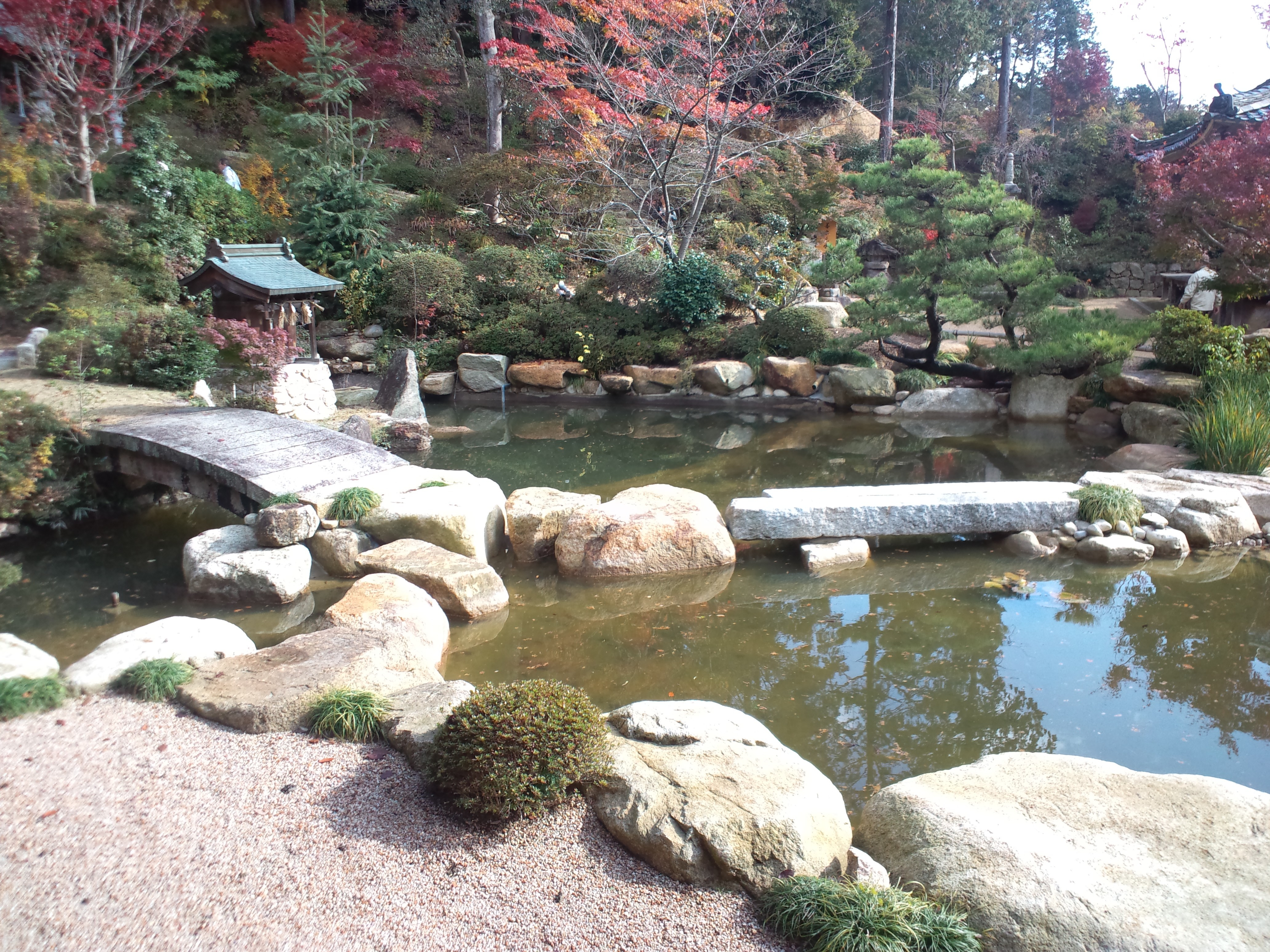
Zensuiji Garden

Zensui-ji (善水寺) is a Buddhist temple in the Iwane neighborhood of the city of Konan, Shiga Prefecture, Japan. It belongs to the Tendai school of Japanese Buddhism. Its main image is a hibutsu statue of Yakushi Nyōrai, which was carved in 993. Its Hondō is a National Treasure.

== History ==
The history of Zensui-ji is uncertain, as the documentary evidence of its foundation has been lost. The temple's legend states that it was founded by Empress Genmei during the Wado era (708-715), and that the temple was originally called "Wado-ji". During the early Heian period, Saichō came to the temple to pray for rain, and converted it to the Tendai sect. Later, when Emperor Kanmu fell ill, Saichō sent water from a spring at this temple, and the emperor made a miraculous recovery. The emperor bestowed the name of "Zensui-ji" on the temple to commemorate this event. At its peak, the temple grew to have 26 subsidiary temples, which occupied both mountains adjacent to the main temple.

The temple is 3.9 kilometers, or approximately a one-hour walk, from Mikumo Station on the JR West Kusatsu Line.

== Cultural Properties ==
The Main Hall (Hondō) of Zensui-ji was built in the Nanboku-chō period and was completed in either 1364 or 1366. It is in the irimoya-zukuri-style and is a seven by five bay building with a hinoki cypress bark shingled roof. The building was designated a National Treasure in 1954.

The temple also has many statues which are National Important Cultural Properties:

- Yakushi Nyōrai, Heian period (the honzon of the temple)
- Bonten and Taishaku-ten
- Bishamonten, Heian period
- Jikokuten and Zōjōten, Kamakura period
- Shi-Tennō, Heian period
- Fudō-Myōō, Heian period
- Monjū Bosatsu in the form of a Buddhist priest, Heian period
- Niō, Heian period
- Shaka Nyōrai, in gold and bronze, depicted as an infant. Nara period. This statue is known to have existed in 762 AD when it was used during a Buddha's Birthday ceremony at Ishiyama-dera and is believed to have been made at the casting workshops at Tōdai-ji.

== See also ==
- List of National Treasures of Japan (temples)
