= Wachūsan Honpo =

- 和中散本舗
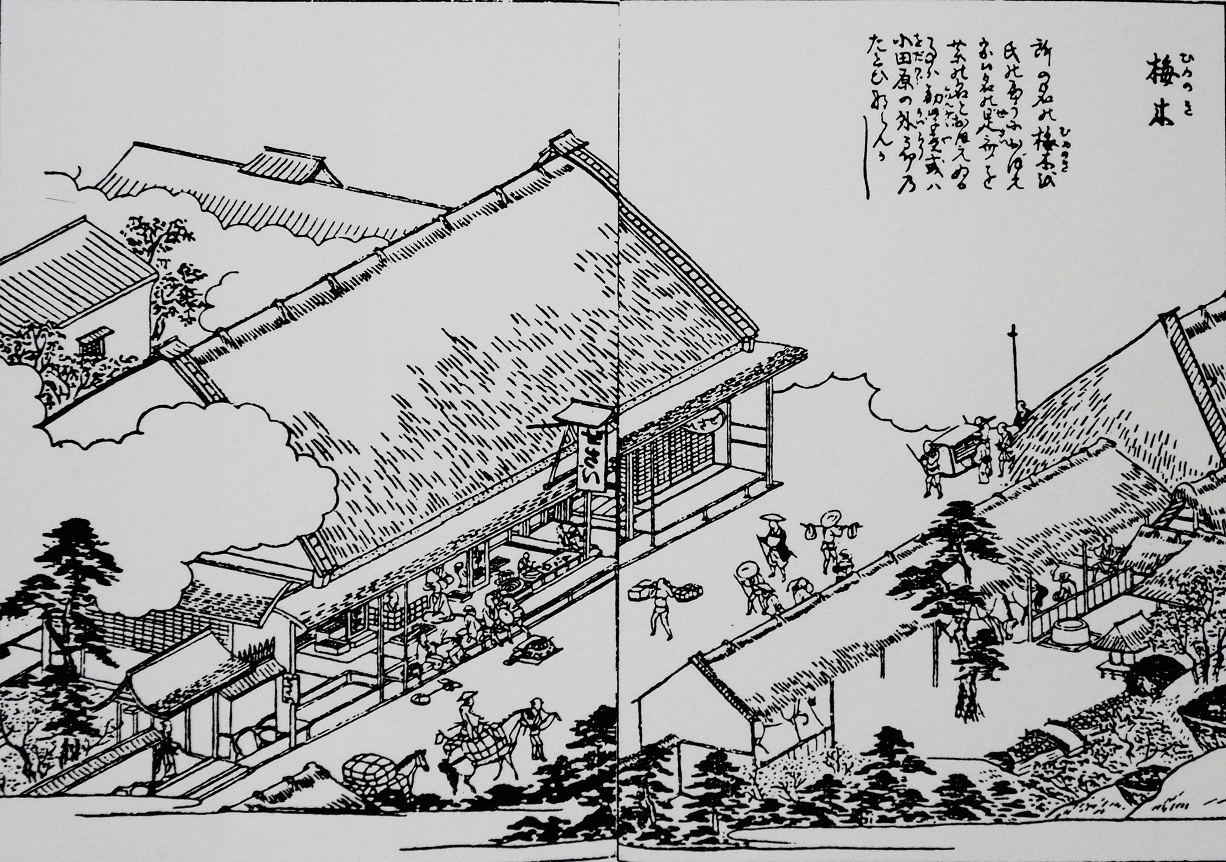
- Wachūsan Honpo in the Edo period Tokaido Meisho-zue

- Location within Shiga Prefecture Location within Japan

General information
- Location: Rittō, Shiga, Shiga Prefecture, Japan
- Coordinates: 35°01′29″N 136°01′07″E
- Opened: 1596
- National Historic Site of Japan National Place of Scenic Beauty Important Cultural Property

Wachūsan Honpo (和中散本舗, Wachūsan Honpo) is an early Edo period pharmacy located on the former Tōkaidō highway in the city of Rittō, Shiga Prefecture, Japan. The building was designated an Important Cultural Property of Japan (ICP) in 1954 and a National Historic Site of Japan in 1949. The ICP designation covers the main house and shop, main gate and the shoin residence

== Overview ==
Rokujizō, where the Wachūsan Honpo is located, was an ai no shuku located between Kusatsu-juku and Ishibe-juku on the Tōkaidō highway. The local speciality of this post station was an herbal medicine called "Wachūsan" which was claimed to be effective against stomach ailments. There were five stores selling this medicine at Rokujizō, but among them, the Ōsumi family called themselves "Wachūsan Honpo" to emphasize their claim to be the originators. The Ōsumi built the a shop called "Zesai-ya" at this location in 1596 directly on the highway, having relocated from a previous location some 300 meters to the northeast. The shop became famous in 1611, when Shogun Tokugawa Ieyasu complained of abdominal pain when visiting the area and recovered immediately after taking the Wachūsan medicine. The "Wachūsan Honpo" was listed in subsequent guidebooks and maps of the Tōkaidō and the medicine was a popular purchase by travelers on the highway.

The Ōsumi family had property on both sides of the highway. The main shop and residence were on the south side of the road. On the north side were stables and a chapel to Yakushi Nyōrai, the Buddha of healing.

The main building consists of the shop, pharmaceutical factory, kitchen, living areas, with the entrance to the east. The building was a large 10 x 9 bay structure (19.4 x19.1 meters), with a Irimoya-style gabled roof with roof tiles. The current building was rebuilt around 1676. The shop portion of the building has an open front facing the highway with an earthen floor. It is divided into an eastern portion with tatami mat flooring for customers to sit, and a western portion with wooden floor containing a stone mill and wooden gears for the grinding of the medicinal ingredients. The driving wheel has a diameter of 3.6 meters and was also used for demonstrations when making sales. The shop area has a 1.6 meter wide awning with a copper-plate roof. In the back of the eastern portion are a number of palatial residential rooms arranged around a Japanese garden which was designed by Kobori Enshu. Some of the rooms have fusuma doors decorated with paintings by Soga Shōhaku. This is not the residence of the Ōsumi family, but was used as a private space for high-ranking customers. The garden was designated a National Place of Scenic Beauty in 2001.

During the Edo period a number of important people visited and left impressions of the shop and garden, including the late-Edo period writer Ōta Nanpo and the German doctor Philipp Franz von Siebold. Emperor Meiji stayed at this location twice: Once in 1868 when he travelled from Kyoto to his new capital of Tokyo for the first time, and once in 1870, when he returned to Kyoto for the third anniversary ceremonies for Emperor Komei.

The Wachūsan Honpo is located about 30 minutes on foot from Tehara Station on the JR West Kusatsu Line.

== See also ==
- List of Historic Sites of Japan (Shiga)
- List of Places of Scenic Beauty of Japan (Shiga)
