= Kōsei Station =

Railway station in Konan, Shiga Prefecture, Japan

Kōsei Station 甲西駅
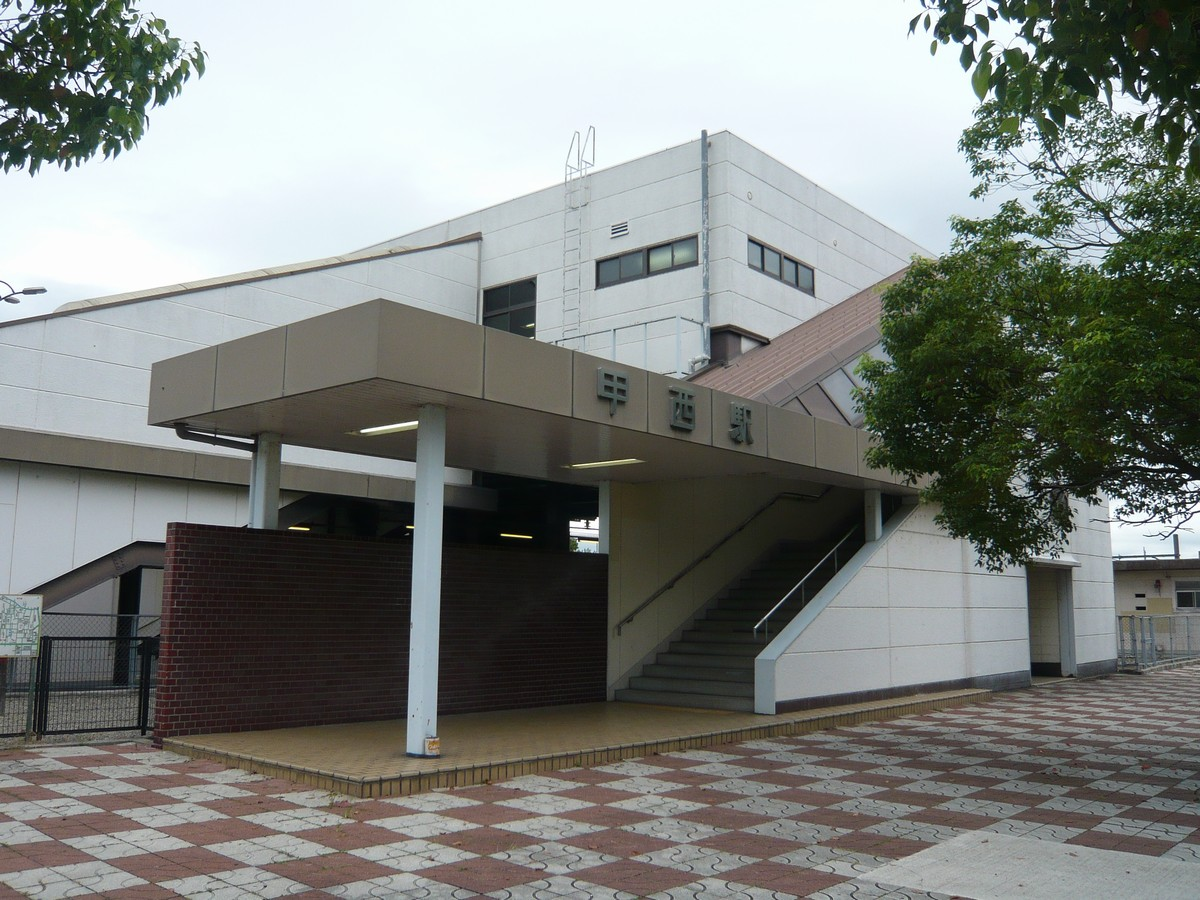
- Kōsei Station in September 2007

General information
- Location: 20-14 Hiramatsu, Konan-shi, Shiga-ken 520-3232; Japan
- Coordinates: 35°0′2.34″N 136°4′56.5″E
- Operator: JR West
- Line: C Kusatsu Line
- Distance: 24.3 km from Tsuge
- Platforms: 1 side platform

Other information
- Website: Official website

History
- Opened: October 1, 1981

Passengers
- FY 2023: 4,090 daily

Services
Preceding station	JR West	Following station
Ishibe towards Kusatsu	Kusatsu Line Local	Mikumo towards Tsuge
Location
- Location within Shiga Prefecture Location within Japan

Kōsei Station (甲西駅, Kōsei-eki) is a passenger railway station located in the city of Konan, Shiga Prefecture, Japan, operated by the West Japan Railway Company (JR West).

== Lines ==
Kōsei Station is served by the Kusatsu Line, and is 24.3 kilometers from the starting point of the line at Tsuge.

== Station layout ==
The station consists of a single side platform serving one bi-directional track, with an elevated station building. The station his attended

=== Platforms ===
1	■ Kusatsu Line	for Kibukawa and Tsuge for Kusatsu and Kyoto

== History ==
Kōsei Station was opened on October 1, 1981 as a passenger station on the Japan National Railway (JNR). The station became part of the West Japan Railway Company on April 1, 1987 due to the privatization and dissolution of the JNR.

== Passenger statistics ==
In fiscal 2019, the station was used by an average of 2318 passengers daily (boarding passengers only).

== Surrounding area ==
- Konan City Hall East Office
- Konan Municipal Kosai Junior High School
- Konan Central Fire Department

== See also ==
- List of railway stations in Japan
