= Rittō =

Rittō may refer to:

- Rittō, Shiga, a city in Japan
- Rittō or Lidong, the 19th solar term
