= Kōka Station =

Railway station in Kōka, Shiga Prefecture, Japan

Kōka Station 甲賀駅
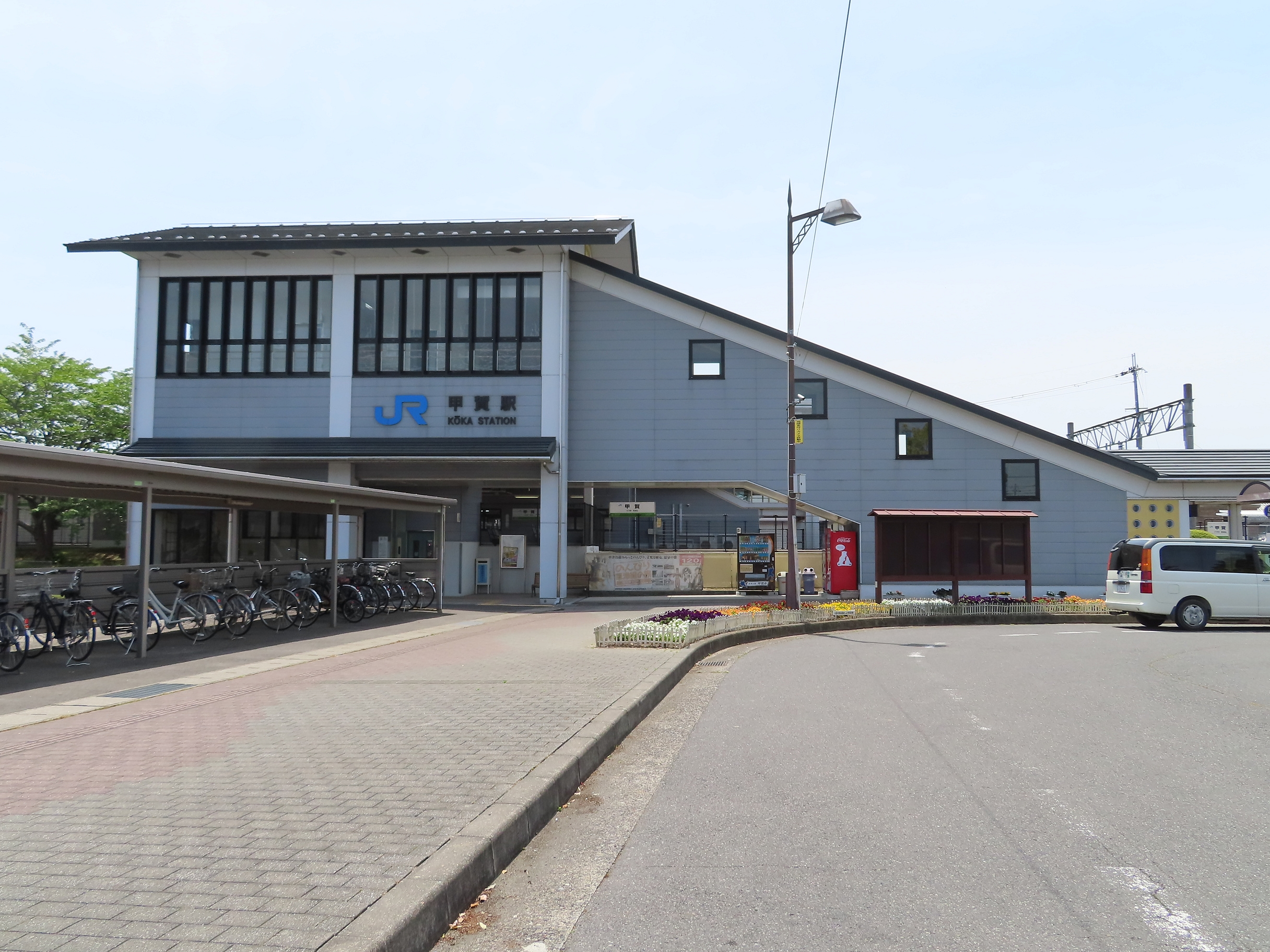
- Kōka Station, north exit, March 2021

General information
- Location: Kōka-chō Oharaichiba, Kōka-shi, Shiga-ken 520-3433; Japan
- Coordinates: 34°54′4.68″N 136°12′45.64″E
- Operator: JR West
- Line: C Kusatsu Line
- Distance: 7.4 km from Tsuge
- Platforms: 2 side platforms

Other information
- Website: Official website

History
- Opened: March 1, 1904
- Former names: Ōhara (to 1918); Ōharaisi (to 1956)

Passengers
- FY 2023: 1,112 daily

Services
Preceding station	JR West	Following station
Terashō towards Kusatsu	Kusatsu Line Local	Aburahi towards Tsuge
Location
- Location within Shiga Prefecture Location within Japan

Kōka Station (甲賀駅, Kōka-eki) is a passenger railway station located in the city of Kōka, Shiga Prefecture, Japan, operated by the West Japan Railway Company (JR West).

== Lines ==
Kōka Station is served by the Kusatsu Line, and is 7.4 kilometers from the starting point of the line at Tsuge.

== Station layout ==
The station consists of two opposed side platforms connected by an elevated station building. The station is staffed.

=== Platforms ===
1	■ Kusatsu Line	for Tsuge
2	■ Kusatsu Line	for Kibukawa and Kusatsu

== History ==
Kōka Station opened on March 1, 1904 as Ōhara Station (大原駅, Ohara-eki) on the Kansai Railway, which was nationalized in 1907 to become part of the Japanese Government Railway (JGR), and subsequently the Japan National Railway (JNR) . On May 1, 1918, the station name was changed to Ōharaichi Station (大原市場駅, Oharaichi-eki). The station became Kōka Station on April 10, 1956. The station became part of the West Japan Railway Company on April 1, 1987 due to the privatization and dissolution of the JNR.

== Passenger statistics ==
In fiscal 2019, the station was used by an average of 855 passengers daily (boarding passengers only).

== Surrounding area ==
- Koka City Koga Junior High School
- Koka Central Park
- Koga no Sato Ninja Village

== See also ==
- List of railway stations in Japan
