= Aburahi Station =

Railway station in Kōka, Shiga Prefecture, Japan

Aburahi Station 油日駅
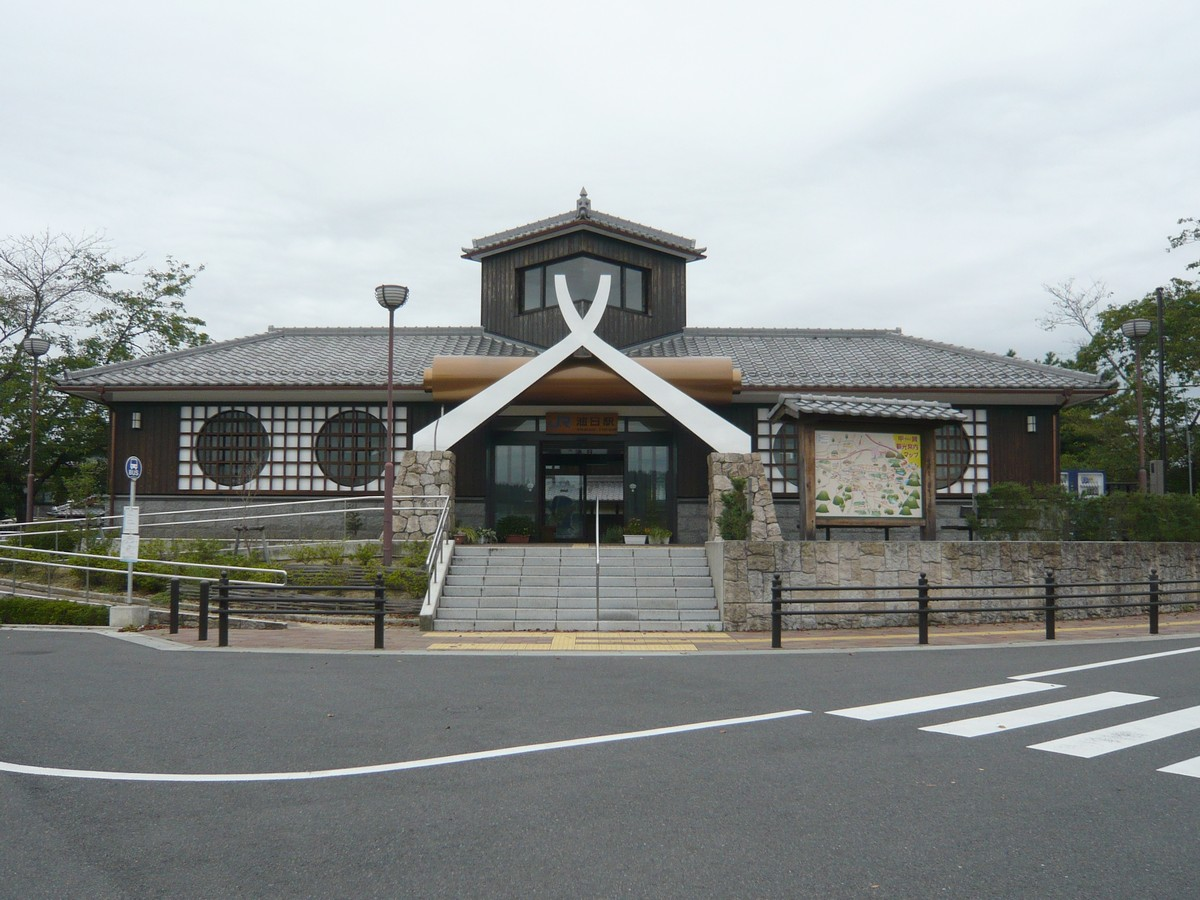
- Aburahi Station in September 2007

General information
- Location: 1453 Kōka-chō Ueno, Kōka-shi, Shiga-ken 520-3421; Japan
- Coordinates: 34°53′22.89″N 136°13′46.31″E
- Operator: JR West
- Line: C Kusatsu Line
- Distance: 5.3 km from Tsuge
- Platforms: 1 side platform

Other information
- Website: Official website

History
- Opened: December 15, 1959

Passengers
- FY 2023: 398 daily

Services
Preceding station	JR West	Following station
Kōka towards Kusatsu	Kusatsu Line Local	Tsuge Terminus
Location
- Location within Shiga Prefecture Location within Japan

Aburahi Station (油日駅, Aburahi-eki) is a passenger railway station located in the city of Kōka, Shiga Prefecture, Japan, operated by the West Japan Railway Company (JR West).

== Lines ==
Aburahi Station is served by the Kusatsu Line, and is 5.3 kilometers from the starting point of the line at Tsuge.

== Station layout ==
The station consists of one side platform serving single bi-directional track. The station is designed with a "ninja" motif in line with the city of Kōka promoting its historical connection with ninjitsu as a tourist attraction. The station is staffed.

=== Platforms ===
1	■ Kusatsu Line	for Kibukawa and Tsuge for Kusatsu and Kyoto

== History ==
Aburahi Station opened on December 15, 1959 as a station on the Japan National Railway (JNR) . The station became part of the West Japan Railway Company on April 1, 1987 due to the privatization and dissolution of the JNR.

== Passenger statistics ==
In fiscal 2019, the station was used by an average of 288 passengers daily (boarding passengers only).

== Surrounding area ==
- Koka City Aburahi Elementary School
- Aburahi Shrine

== See also ==
- List of railway stations in Japan
