= Terashō Station =

Railway station in Kōka, Shiga Prefecture, Japan

Terashō Station 寺庄駅
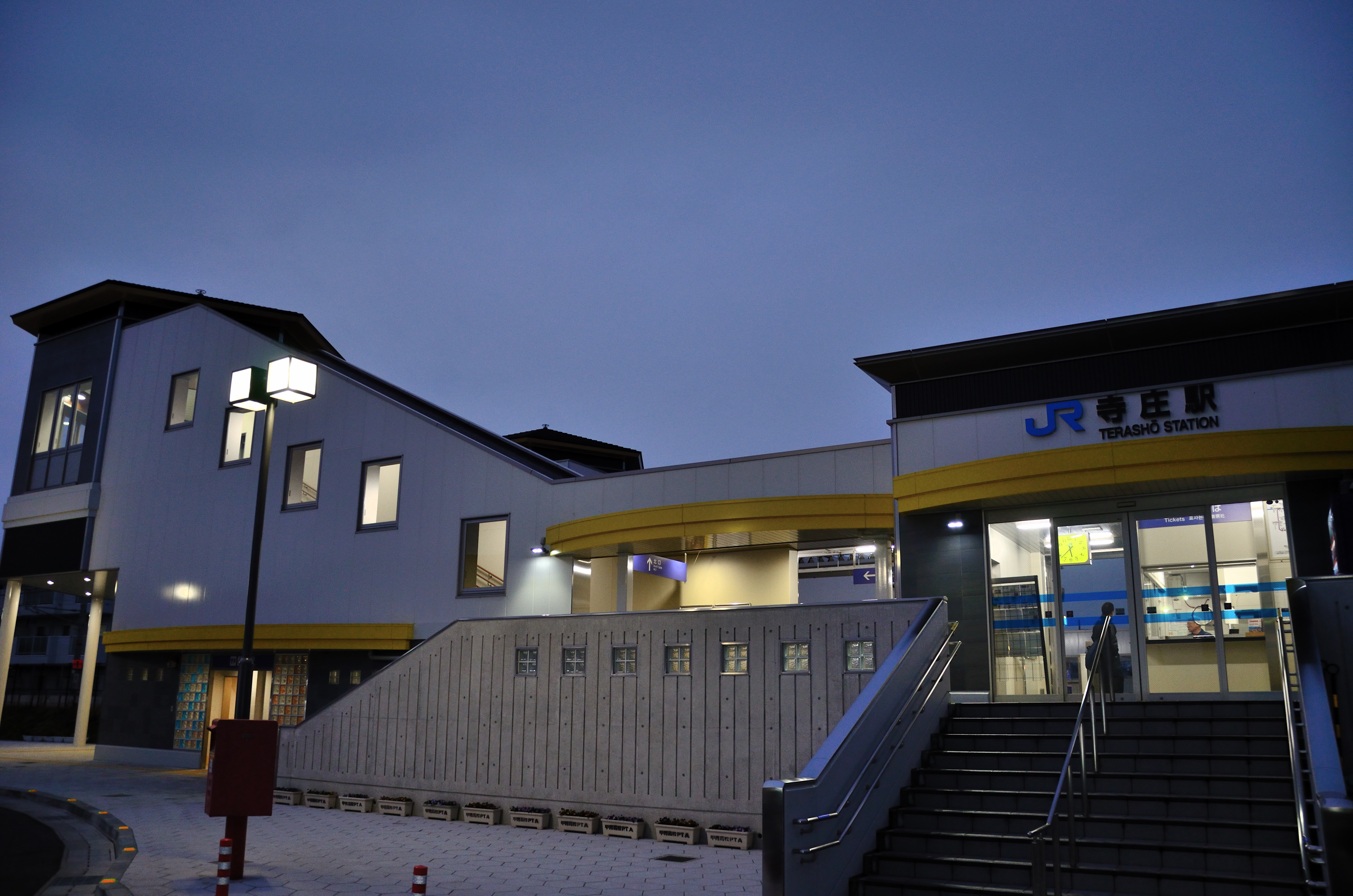
- Terashō Station in February 2012

General information
- Location: Kōnan-chō Terashō 481-1, Kōka-shi, Shiga-ken 520-3301; Japan
- Coordinates: 34°55′8.68″N 136°11′9.21″E
- Operator: JR West
- Line: C Kusatsu Line
- Distance: 10.5 km from Tsuge
- Platforms: 1 side platform

Other information
- Website: Official website

History
- Opened: December 25, 1959

Passengers
- FY 2023: 1,410 daily

Services
Preceding station	JR West	Following station
Kōnan towards Kusatsu	Kusatsu Line Local	Kōka towards Tsuge
Location
- Location within Shiga Prefecture Location within Japan

Terashō Station (寺庄駅, Terashō-eki) is a passenger railway station located in the city of Kōka, Shiga Prefecture, Japan, operated by the West Japan Railway Company (JR West).

== Lines ==
Terashō Station is served by the Kusatsu Line, and is 10.5 kilometers from the starting point of the line at Tsuge.

== Station layout ==
The station consists of one side platform serving a single bi-directional track, with an elevated station building. The station is staffed.

=== Platforms ===
1	■ Kusatsu Line	for Tsuge for Kibukawa and Kusatsu

== History ==
Terashō Station opened on December 25, 1959 on the Japan National Railway (JNR). The station became part of the West Japan Railway Company on April 1, 1987 due to the privatization and dissolution of the JNR.

== Passenger statistics ==
In fiscal 2019, the station was used by an average of 753 passengers daily (boarding passengers only).

== Surrounding area ==
- Shiga Prefectural Konan High School
- Jizo-do (Hokukaku-do)
- Former Shiga Bank Konan Branch-Designed by Vories. Completed in 1925. Former Terashō Bank head office.
- Koga City Konan Junior High School

== See also ==
- List of railway stations in Japan
