= Shindō Station =

Railway station in Iga, Mie Prefecture, Japan

Shindō Station 新堂駅
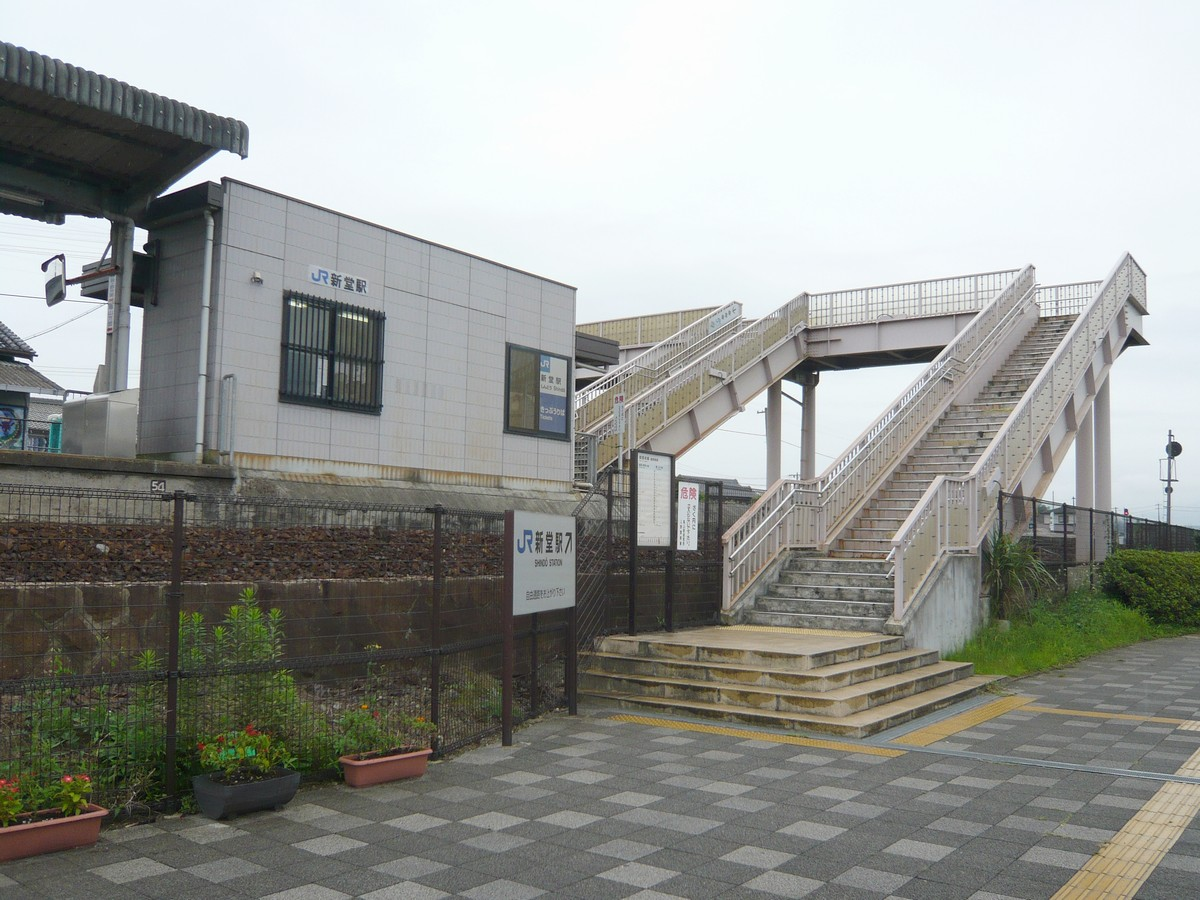
- Shindō Station

General information
- Location: 318, Shindōnakade, Iga-shi, Mie-ken 519-1416; Japan
- Coordinates: 34°49′16″N 136°12′24″E
- System: JR-West regional rail station
- Owner: West Japan Railway Company (JR-West)
- Operator: Shindō Station Managing Enterprise, Limited
- Lines: Passenger train services: V Kansai Line; Railway track: Kansai Main Line
- Distance: 26.2 km (16.3 miles) from Kameyama
- Platforms: 1 island platform
- Tracks: 2
- Train operators: JR-West
- Bus stands: 1
- Connections: Mie Kotsu: 27・29 at Shindō-eki-minamiguchi; Iga City Administrative Bus: Ayama Administrative Traveling Service Car Shindō Route at Shindō-eki-minamiguchi

Construction
- Structure type: At grade
- Cycle facilities: Available
- Accessible: No

Other information
- Website: Official website

History
- Opened: 15 July 1921

Passengers
- FY 2023: 370 daily
Services
Preceding station	JRW	Following station
Sanagu toward Kamo	Kansai Line	Tsuge toward Kameyama
Sanagu toward Kamo	Kansai Line	Terminus
Location
- Location within Mie Prefecture Location within Japan

Shindō Station (新堂駅, Shindō-eki) is a passenger railway station of the West Japan Railway Company (JR-West) located in the city of Iga, Mie, Japan.

== Lines ==
Shindō Station is served by the Kansai Main Line and is located 86.1 rail kilometres from the terminus of the line at Nagoya Station and 26.2 rail kilometers from Kameyama Station.

== Layout ==
The station consists of one island platform serving two tracks, connected to the station building by a footbridge.

=== Platforms ===
Downbound (Westbound)	■ Kansai Line	for Kamo and Iga-Ueno
Upbound (Eastbound)	■ Kansai Line	for Kameyama and Tsuge

== History ==
Shindō Station was opened on July 15, 1921, as a station on the Imperial Government Railways (IGR), which became Japan National Railways (JNR) after World War II. Freight operations were discontinued from August 1, 1970. With the privatization of JNR on April 1, 1987, the station came under the control of JR-West. In July 2002, the station was extensively remodeled, with the original side platform and island platform replaced by a single island platform and with the station building rebuilt.

== Passenger statistics ==
In fiscal 2019, the station was used by an average of 195 passengers daily (boarding passengers only).

== Surrounding area ==
- Moku Moku Farm

== See also ==
- List of railway stations in Japan
