= Tehara Station =

Railway station in Ritto, Shiga Prefecture, Japan

Tehara Station 手原駅
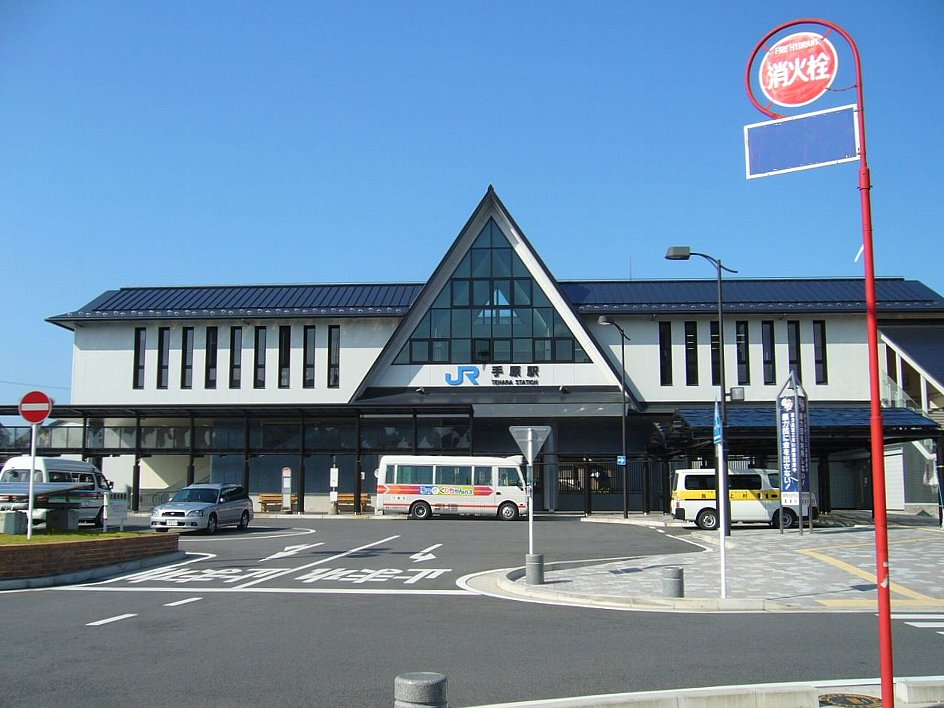
- Tehara Station in October 2006

General information
- Location: 3-1 Tegara, Rittō-shi, Shiga-ken 520-3047; Japan
- Coordinates: 35°1′38.45″N 135°59′57.25″E
- Operator: JR West
- Line: C Kusatsu Line
- Distance: 32.7 km from Tsuge
- Platforms: 2 side platforms
- Tracks: 2

Other information
- Website: Official website

History
- Opened: November 5, 1922

Passengers
- FY 2023: 6,170 daily

Services
Preceding station	JR West	Following station
Kusatsu Terminus	Kusatsu Line Local	Ishibe towards Tsuge
Location
- Location within Shiga Prefecture Location within Japan

Tehara Station (手原駅, Tehara-eki) is a passenger railway station located in the city of Rittō, Shiga Prefecture, Japan, operated by the West Japan Railway Company (JR West).

== Lines ==
Tehara Station is served by the Kusatsu Line, and is 32.7 kilometers from the starting point of the line at Tsuge.

== Station layout ==
The station consists of two opposed side platforms connected by an elevated station building. The station is staffed.

=== Platforms ===
1	■ Kusatsu Line	for Kibukawa and Tsuge
2	■ Kusatsu Line	for Kusatsu and Kyoto

== History ==
Tehara Station opened on November 5, 1922 as a station on the Japanese Government Railway (JGR), which subsequently became the Japan National Railway (JNR) . The station became part of the West Japan Railway Company on April 1, 1987 due to the privatization and dissolution of the JNR.

== Passenger statistics ==
In fiscal 2019, the station was used by an average of 3069 passengers daily (boarding passengers only).

== Surrounding area ==
- Ritto City Hall
- Shiga Prefectural Ritto High School

== See also ==
- List of railway stations in Japan
