= Ishibe Station =

Railway station in Konan, Shiga Prefecture, Japan

Ishibe Station 石部駅
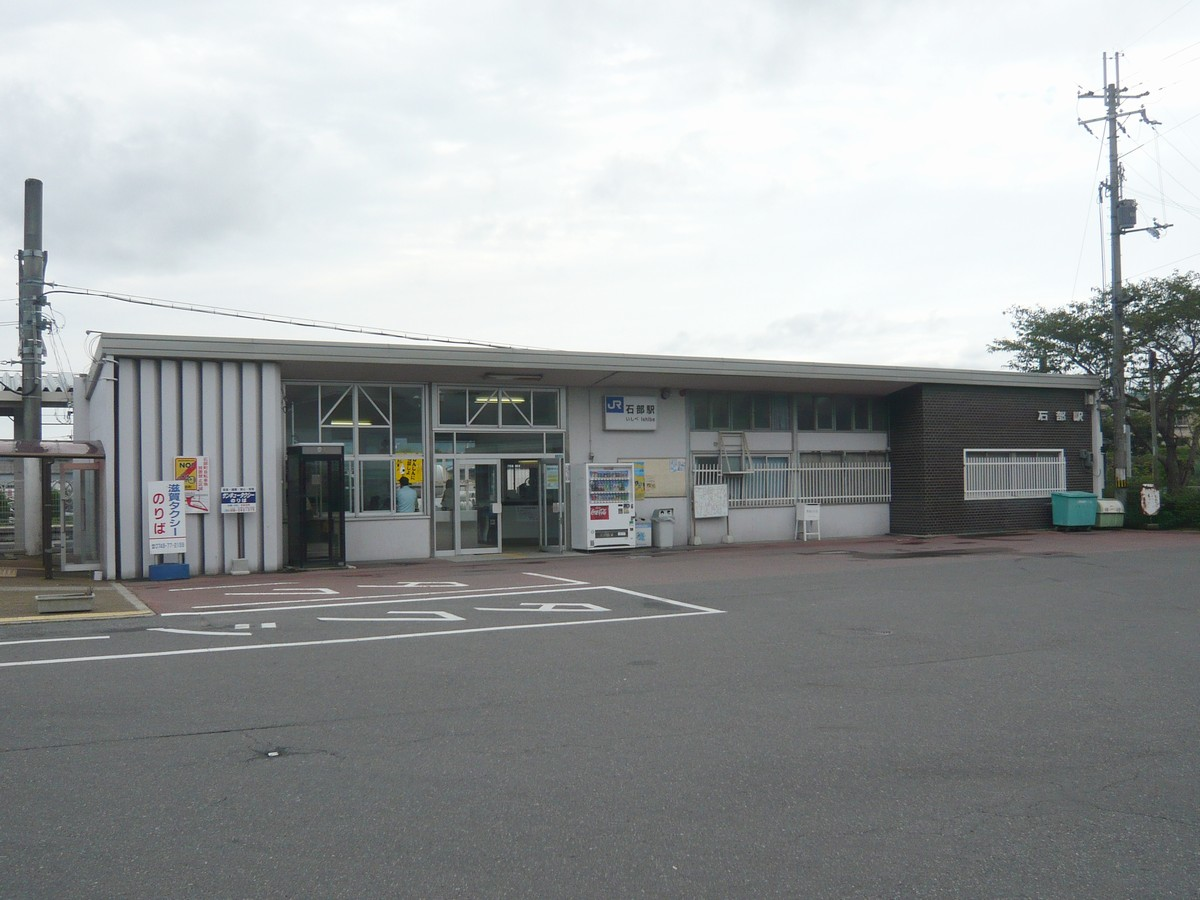
- Ishibe Station in September 2007

General information
- Location: 3-5 Ishibenishi, Konan-shi, Shiga-ken 520-3105; Japan
- Coordinates: 35°1′3.67″N 136°3′10.67″E
- Operator: JR West
- Line: C Kusatsu Line
- Distance: 27.6 km from Tsuge
- Platforms: 2 side platforms
- Tracks: 2

Other information
- Website: Official website

History
- Opened: December 15, 1889

Passengers
- FY 2023: 3,354 daily

Services
Preceding station	JR West	Following station
Tehara towards Kusatsu	Kusatsu Line Local	Kōsei towards Tsuge
Location
- Location within Shiga Prefecture Location within Japan

Ishibe Station (石部駅, Ishibe-eki) is a passenger railway station located in the city of Konan, Shiga Prefecture, Japan, operated by the West Japan Railway Company (JR West).

== Lines ==
Ishibe Station is served by the Kusatsu Line, and is 27.6 kilometers from the starting point of the line at Tsuge.

== Station layout ==
The station consists of two opposed side platforms connected by a footbridge. The station is staffed.

=== Platforms ===
1	■ Kusatsu Line	for Kibukawa and Tsuge
2	■ Kusatsu Line	for Kusatsu and Kyoto

== History ==
Ishibe Station opened on December 15, 1889 as a station on the Kansai Railway, which was nationalized in 1907 to become part of the Japanese Government Railway (JGR), and subsequently the Japan National Railway (JNR) . The station became part of the West Japan Railway Company on April 1, 1987 due to the privatization and dissolution of the JNR.

== Passenger statistics ==
In fiscal 2019, the station was used by an average of 1871 passengers daily (boarding passengers only).

== Surrounding area ==
- Yoshimiko Shrine -10 minutes on foot
- Yoshihime Shrine -15 minutes on foot
- Ishibe-shukuba no Sato -15 minutes on foot
- Ishibe Historical Museum -15 minutes on foot

== See also ==
- List of railway stations in Japan
