= Konan, Shiga =

Konan 湖南市
- City
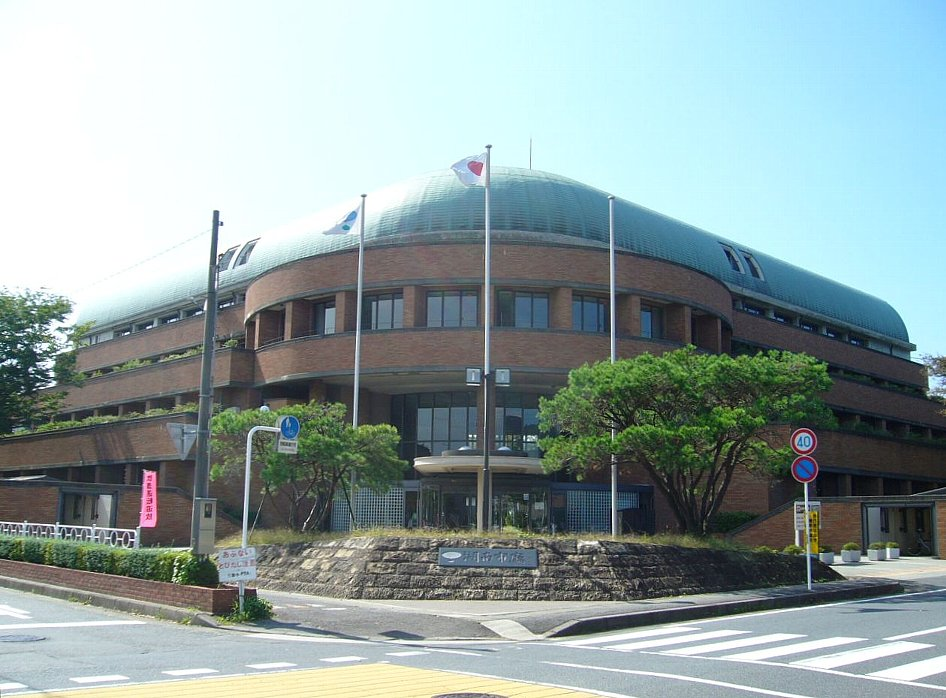
- Konan City Hall

- Flag Emblem

- Coordinates: 35°0′N 136°5′E
- Country: Japan
- Region: Kansai
- Prefecture: Shiga

Government
  - Mayor: Kayoko Matsuura

Area
  - Total: 70.40 km^{2} (27.18 sq mi)

Population (September 1, 2021)
  - Total: 54,607
  - Density: 775.7/km^{2} (2,009/sq mi)
- Time zone: UTC+9 (Japan Standard Time)
- Tree: Utsukushimatsu, a variety of Japanese red pine
- Flower: Satsuki azalea
- Bird: Japanese bush warbler
- City Hall address: 1-1 Chūō, Konan-shi, Shiga-ken 520-3288
- Website: Official website

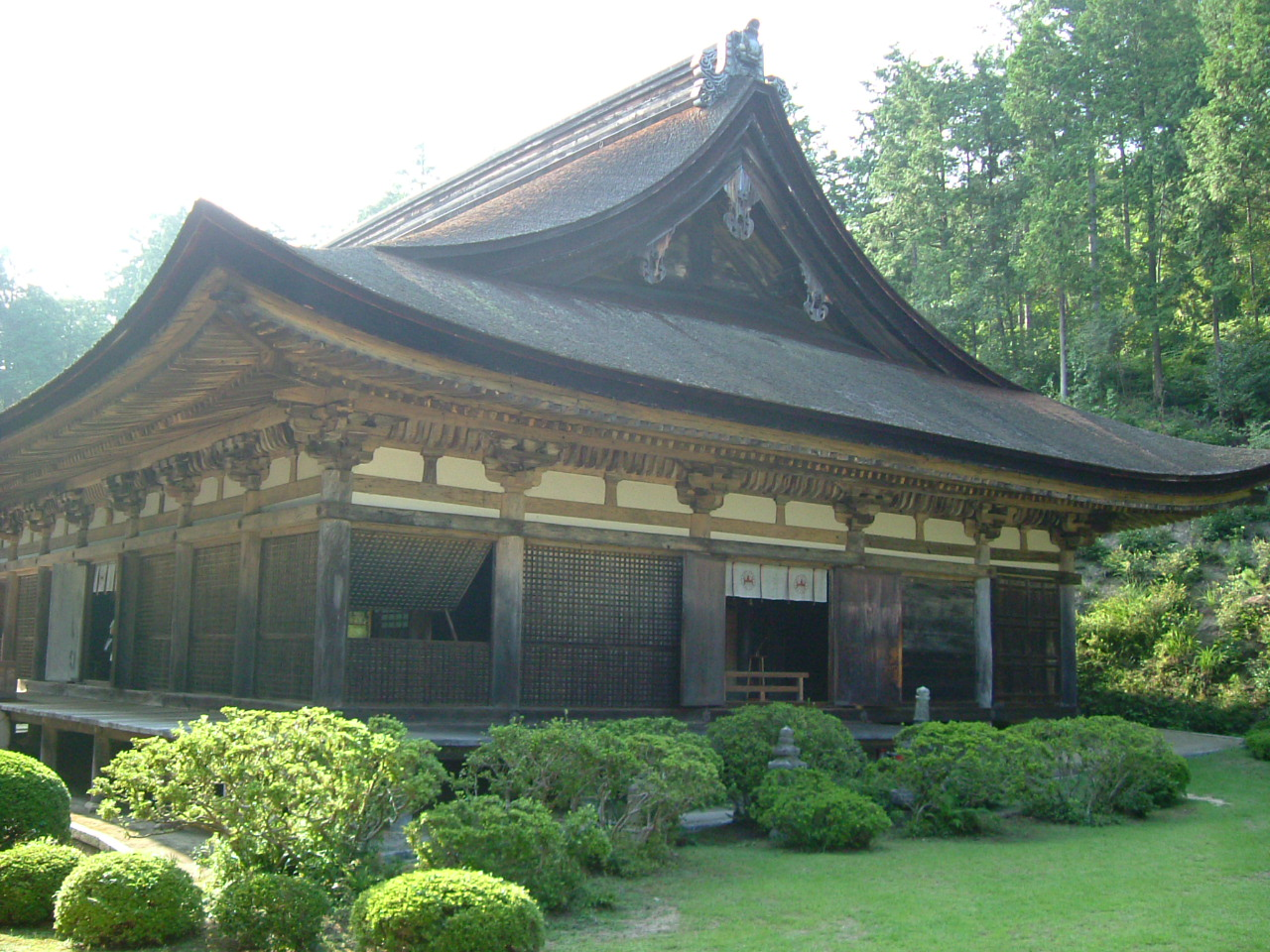
Zensui-ji in Konan

Konan (湖南市, Konan-shi) is a city located in southern Shiga Prefecture, Japan. As of 1 October 2021, the city had an estimated population of 54,607 in 24305 households and a population density of 780 persons per km^{2}. The total area of the city is 70.4 square kilometres (27.2 sq mi).

== Geography ==
Konan, as its name implies, is south of Lake Biwa in the center of the southern portion of Shiga Prefecture The city does not actually border the lake. The Ansei Mountains are in the south of the city and the Iwane Mountains in the north, with the Yasu River running from east-to-west through the center.

=== Neighboring municipalities ===
Shiga Prefecture

- Kōka
- Rittō
- Ryūō
- Yasu

=== Climate ===
Konan has a humid subtropical climate (Köppen Cfa) characterized by warm summers and cool winters with light to no snowfall. The average annual temperature in Konan is 14.1 °C. The average annual rainfall is 1430 mm with September as the wettest month. The temperatures are highest on average in August, at around 26.0 °C, and lowest in January, at around 2.6 °C.

== Demographics ==
Per Japanese census data, the population of Konan increased rapidly in the 1970s but has plateaued in recent decades.

Historical population
Year	Pop.	±%
1920	10,829	—
1930	11,275	+4.1%
1940	11,291	+0.1%
1950	15,066	+33.4%
1960	15,033	−0.2%
1970	18,646	+24.0%
1980	32,729	+75.5%
1990	46,093	+40.8%
2000	53,740	+16.6%
2010	54,665	+1.7%
2020	54,460	−0.4%

== History ==
Konan is part of ancient Ōmi Province and contains Ishibe-juku, the 51st post station on the route of the Tōkaidō highway connecting Heian-kyō with the eastern provinces during the Edo period. The village of Ishibe was established within Kōka District, Shiga with the creation of the modern municipalities system on April 1, 1889. It was elevated to town status on June 1, 1903. On October 1, 2004, Ishibe merged with the neighboring town of Kōsei (also from Kōka District) to form the city of Konan. I

== Government ==
Konan has a mayor-council form of government with a directly elected mayor and a unicameral city council of 18 members. Konan contributes two members to the Shiga Prefectural Assembly. In terms of national politics, the city is part of Shiga 3rd district of the lower house of the Diet of Japan.

== Economy ==
The economy of Konan is centered on agriculture and light manufacturing. The Konan Industrial Park on the Meishin Expressway is the largest industrial park in the prefecture.

== Education ==
Konan has nine public elementary schools and four public middle schools operated by the city government. There are two public high schools operated by the Shiga Prefectural Department of Education. The prefecture also operates one special education school for the handicapped.

== Transportation ==
=== Railway ===
JR West – Kusatsu Line

- Mikumo - Kōsei - Ishibe

=== Highway ===
- Meishin Expressway
- National Route 1
- National Route 477

== Friendship cities ==
- St. Johns, Michigan, United States, since 2004

== Local attractions ==
- Chōjū-ji, Buddhist temple with National Treasure main hall
- site of Ishibe-juku
- Jōraku-ji, Buddhist temple with National Treasure main hall and three-story pagoda
- Zensui-ji, Buddhist temple with National Treasure main hall

== Notable people ==
- Kei Aran, actress
- Tenzo Okumura, politician
- Yuta Shimizu, tennis player
