= Komasaka Stone Buddhas =

Group of Japanese Buddhist statues

- 狛坂磨崖仏 (Japanese)
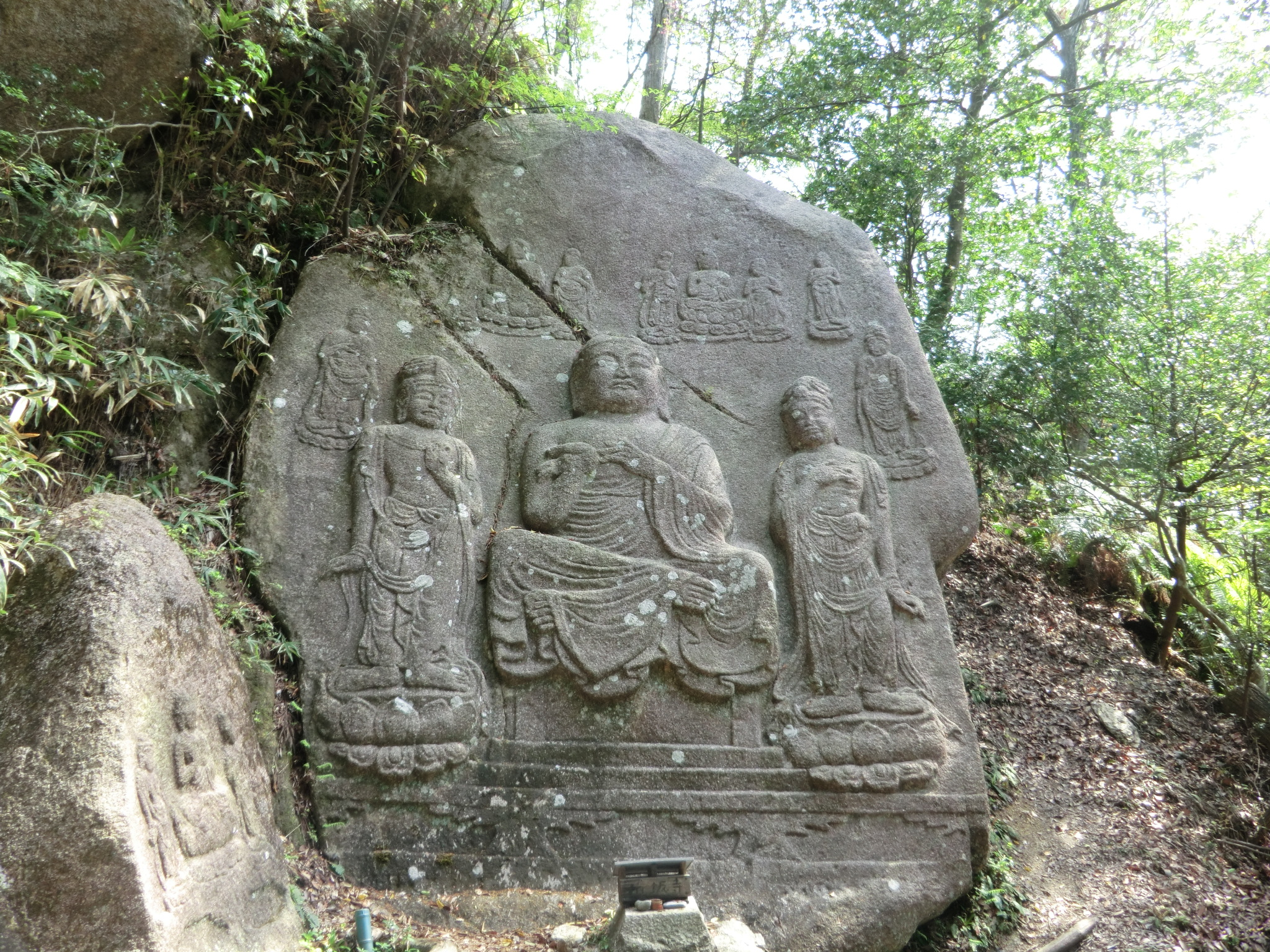

- Komasaka Stone Buddhasas Komasaka Stone Buddhas (Japan)
- 34°57′32″N 136°00′39″E
- Periods: Nara period
- Location: Rittō, Shiga Prefecture, Japan
- Region: Kansai region

Site notes
- Public access: Yes

The Komasaka Stone Buddhas (狛坂磨崖仏, Komasaka magaibutsu) are a group of large religious statues carved in bas-relief into a granite cliff in Arahari neighborhood of the city of Rittō, Shiga Prefecture in the Kansai region of Japan. The site was designated a National Historic Site of Japan in 1944.

== Overview ==
The Komasaka Stone Buddhas are located on the Konzeyama Hiking Course near the border with the city of Ōtsu. The group consists of a seated statue of Amida Nyōrai flanked by statue of Kannon Bosatsu and Seishi Bosatsu. The image of Amida Nyōrai is three meters tall, and has 12 smaller Buddha images carved around it. The carving is estimated to date from the Nara period, but the details of its history are not known. It is recorded in ancient documents that a Buddhist temple called Konshō-ji existed at this site in 816 AD, which is close to the period in which this carving was made. The style of the image is greatly influenced by the style of Later Silla Kingdom (661-935) and the name of "Komasaka" also hints that it may have been carved by immigrants from the mainland.

The site is located approximately two hours on foot from the "Kamitanakamikiryu" bus stop on the Teisan Konan Kotsu Bus from Kusatsu Station on the JR West Tōkaidō Main Line.

== See also ==
- List of Historic Sites of Japan (Shiga)
