= Mikumo Station =

Railway station in Konan, Shiga Prefecture, Japan

Mikumo Station 三雲駅
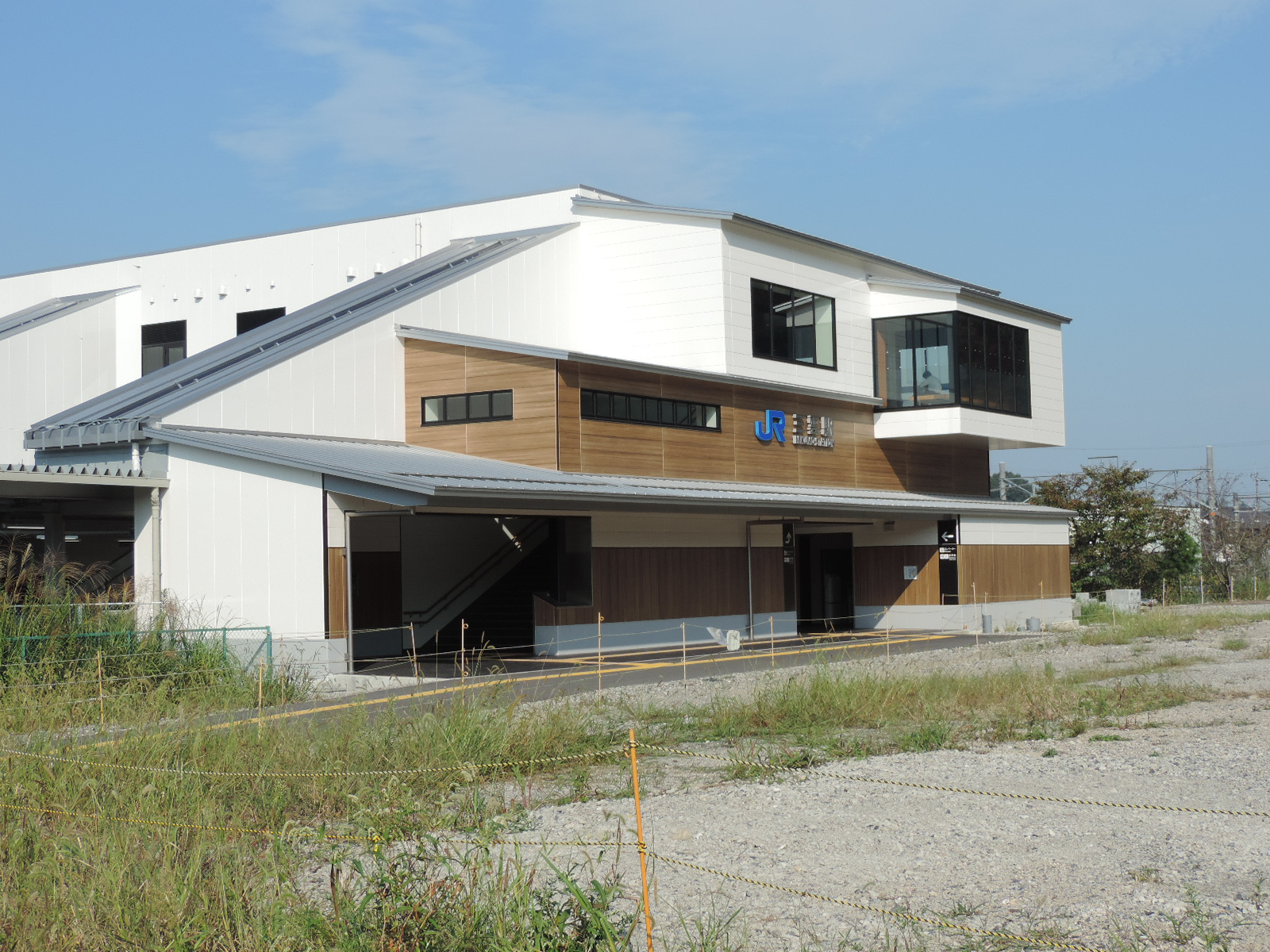
- Mikumo Station in October 2017

General information
- Location: 457 Arakawa Mikumo, Konan-shi, Shiga-ken 520-3221; Japan
- Coordinates: 34°58′59.27″N 136°7′4.00″E
- Operator: JR West
- Line: C Kusatsu Line
- Distance: 20.5 km from Tsuge
- Platforms: 2 side platforms

Other information
- Website: Official website

History
- Opened: December 15, 1889

Passengers
- FY 2023: 3,666 daily

Services
Preceding station	JR West	Following station
Kōsei towards Kusatsu	Kusatsu Line Local	Kibukawa towards Tsuge
Location
- Location within Shiga Prefecture Location within Japan

Mikumo Station (三雲駅, Mikumo-eki) is a passenger railway station located in the city of Konan, Shiga Prefecture, Japan, operated by the West Japan Railway Company (JR West).

== Lines ==
Mikumo Station is served by the Kusatsu Line, and is 20.5 kilometers from the starting point of the line at Tsuge.

== Station layout ==
The station consists of two opposed side platforms connected by an elevated station building. The station has a Midori no Madoguchi staffed ticket office.

=== Platforms ===
1	■ Kusatsu Line	for Kibukawa and Tsuge
2	■ Kusatsu Line	for Kusatsu and Kyoto

== History ==
Mikumo Station opened on December 15, 1889 as a station on the Kansai Railway, which was nationalized in 1907 to become part of the Japanese Government Railway (JGR), and subsequently the Japan National Railway (JNR) . The station became part of the West Japan Railway Company on April 1, 1987 due to the privatization and dissolution of the JNR.

== Passenger statistics ==
In fiscal 2019, the station was used by an average of 1957 passengers daily (boarding passengers only).

== Surrounding area ==
- Kosei Mikumo Post Office
- Shiga Prefectural Road No. 13 Hikone Yokaichi Kosai Linel

== See also ==
- List of railway stations in Japan
