= Rittō, Shiga =

Rittō 栗東市
- City
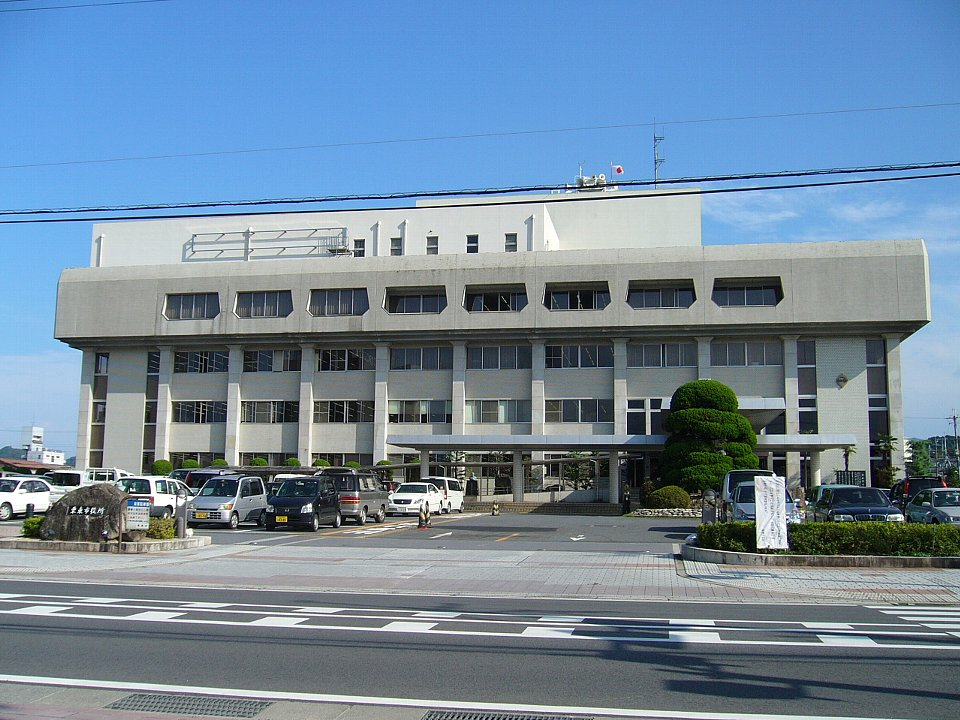
- Rittō City Hall

- Flag Emblem

- Location of Rittō in Shiga Prefecture

- Location in Japan
- Coordinates: 35°01′N 136°00′E
- Country: Japan
- Region: Kansai
- Prefecture: Shiga

Government
  - Mayor: Masahiro Nomura

Area
  - Total: 52.75 km^{2} (20.37 sq mi)

Population (October 1, 2021)
  - Total: 70,312
  - Density: 1,333/km^{2} (3,452/sq mi)
- Time zone: UTC+09:00 (JST)
- City hall address: 1-13-33, Anyōji, Rittō-shi, Shiga-ken 520-3088
- Website: Official website
- Symbols
- Bird: Japanese white-eye
- Flower: Calendula officinalis
- Tree: Kaizuka ibuki

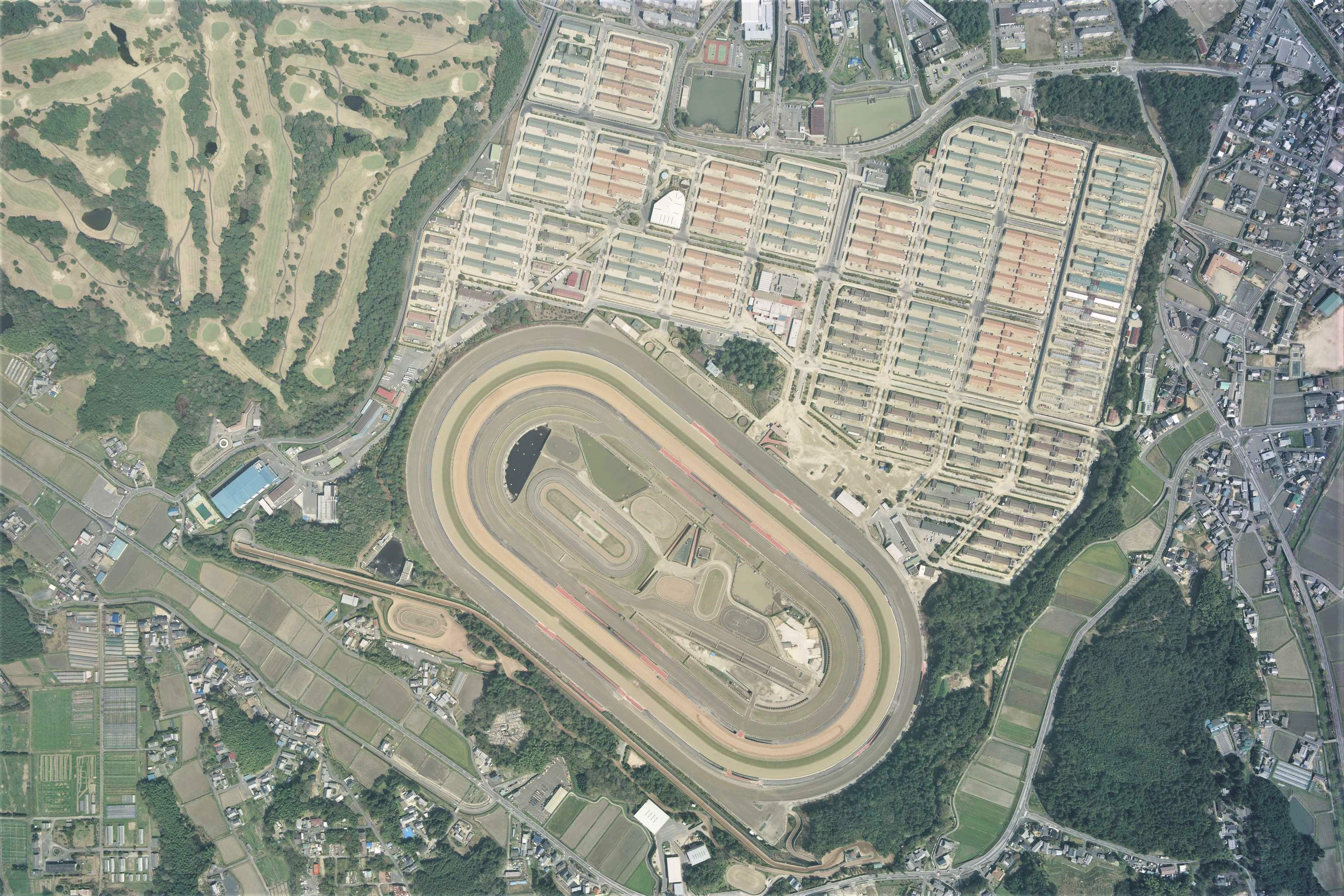
Ritto Training Center

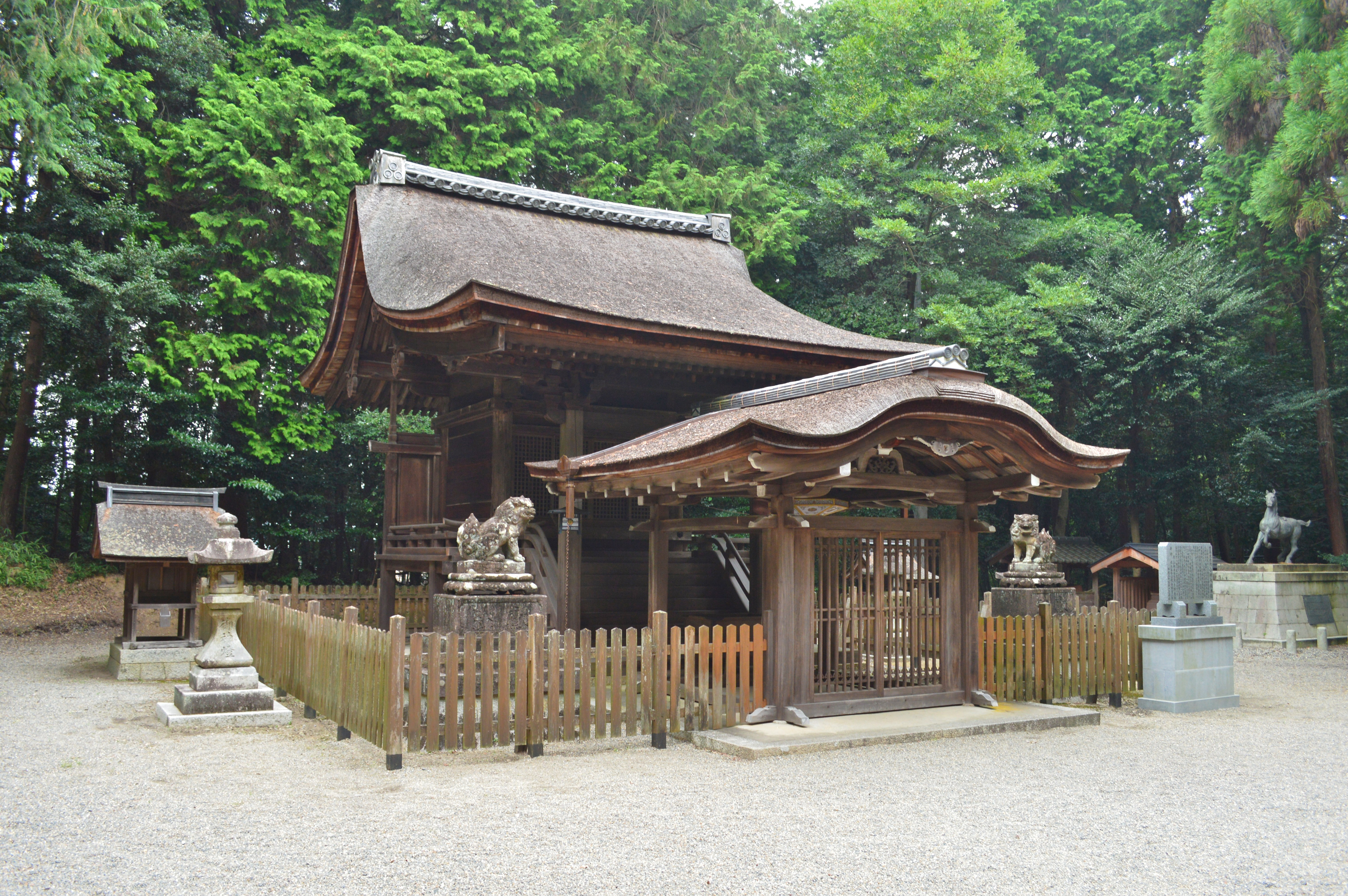
Otsuki Taisha honden

Rittō (栗東市, Rittō-shi) is a city located in Shiga Prefecture, Japan. As of 1 October 2021, the city had an estimated population of 70,312 in 29068 households and a population density of 1300 persons per km^{2}. The total area of the city is 52.75 square kilometres (20.37 sq mi). It is well known to Japanese horse racing fans because it is home to one of the two Japan Racing Association's training centers and the famous jockey brothers, Yutaka Take and Koshiro Take who were also born in Rittō.

== Geography ==
Located in the southern part of Shiga prefecture, Rittō is located on Japan's main transportation arteries. The Tōkaidō Shinkansen, JR Tōkaidō Main Line, Meishin Expressway, Shin-Meishin Expressway, Japan National Route 1 and Japan National Route 8 all pass through the city. The opening of highway interchanges and new train station has led to increasing urbanization, as the city is within commuting distance of Kyoto and Osaka, and is relatively close to Nagoya to the east. About half of them city area is mountainous.

=== Neighboring municipalities ===
Shiga Prefecture

- Konan
- Kōka
- Kusatsu
- Moriyama
- Ōtsu
- Yasu

=== Climate ===
Rittō has a humid subtropical climate (Köppen Cfa) characterized by warm summers and cool winters with light to no snowfall. The average annual temperature in Rittō is 14.0 °C. The average annual rainfall is 1430 mm with September as the wettest month. The temperatures are highest on average in August, at around 26.0 °C, and lowest in January, at around 2.5 °C.

== Demographics ==
Per Japanese census data, the population of Rittō increased rapidly since the 1960s.

Historical population
Year	Pop.	±%
1960	14,043	—
1970	23,031	+64.0%
1980	37,033	+60.8%
1990	45,049	+21.6%
2000	54,856	+21.8%
2010	63,655	+16.0%
2020	68,820	+8.1%

== History ==
Rittō is part of ancient Ōmi Province. In 1487, during the Sengoku period, the area of Magari, which today is part of Rittō, was the site of a battle between the shogun Ashikaga Yoshihisa against Rokkaku Takayori and allied ninja from Iga and Kōka ikki. The forces of Rokkaku, Iga, and Kōka defeated those of the shogun, and the ninja gained significant fame from their military actions.

During the Edo Period, much of the area which became Rittō was under control of either Zeze Domain or was tenryo territory directly administered by the Tokugawa shogunate. The area was organized into villages within Kurita District, Shiga with the establishment of the modern municipalities system on April 1, 1889. On October 1, 1954 the villages of Konze, Hayama, Haruta and Daihō were merged to create the town of Rittō.

The kanji characters for Rittō are "chestnut" (栗; kuri) and "East" (東; higashi), despite the fact that Rittō is located in western Japan and is not known for chestnut trees. The name was taken from its location in the eastern portion of former Kurita District (栗太郡; Kurita-gun).

The Japan Racing Association opened the Ritto Training Center on November 11, 1969, and has been one of the two major training centers for race horses in Japan.

Rittō was raised to city status on October 1, 2001.

== Government ==
Rittō has a mayor-council form of government with a directly elected mayor and a unicameral city council of 18 members. Rittō contributes two members to the Shiga Prefectural Assembly. In terms of national politics, the city is part of Shiga 3rd district of the lower house of the Diet of Japan.

== Economy ==
The economy of Rittō was formerly centered on agriculture; however due to its location near the major population centers of Kyoto and Osaka and on major transportation arteries, it is increasing industrialized, with the city government aggressively pursuing the development of industrial parks. Sekisui Chemical and Nissin Foods are major employers.

== Education ==
Rittō has nine public elementary schools and three public middle schools operated by the city government. There are two public high schools operated by the Shiga Prefectural Department of Education. The prefecture also operates one special education school for the handicapped.

== Transportation ==
=== Railway ===
JR West – Biwako Line

- Rittō

JR West – Kusatsu Line

- Tehara

=== Highway ===
- Meishin Expressway
- National Route 1
- National Route 8

== Sister cities ==
- Birmingham, Michigan, United States, since 1976
- Hengyang, Hunan, China

== Local attractions ==
- Komasaka Stone Buddhas, National Historic Site
- Otsuki Taisha, Shinto shrine
- Wachūsan Honpo, Edo Period pharmacy, National Historic Site

== Notable people ==
- Yuichi Fukunaga, horse trainer and former jockey
- Kenichi Ikezoe, jockey
- Manabu Ikezoe, horse trainer
- Yutaka Kobayashi (actor), actor
- Masanori Morita, mangaka
- Koshiro Take, horse trainer and former jockey
- Yutaka Take, jockey
