= Kusatsu Line =

Railway line in Japan

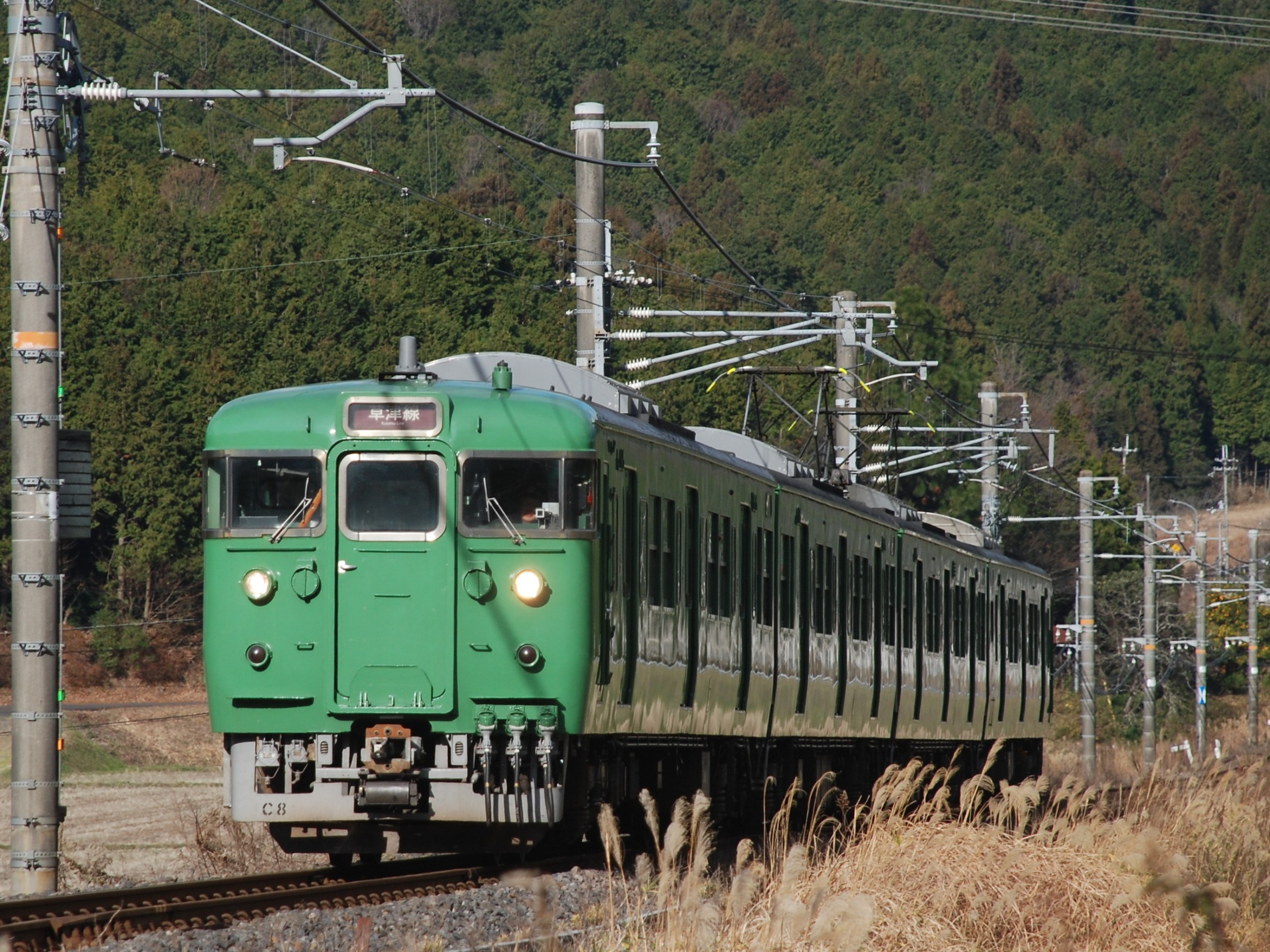
- 113 series on the Kusatsu Line

Overview
- Native name: 草津線
- Status: Operational
- Owner: JR West
- Locale: Mie Prefecture and Shiga Prefecture
- Termini: Tsuge; Kusatsu
- Stations: 11

Service
- Type: Heavy rail
- System: Urban Network
- Rolling stock: 221 series EMU; 223-1000 series EMU; 223-2000 series EMU; 223-2500 series EMU; 223-6000 series EMU; 225-0 series EMU; 225-100 series EMU

History
- Opened: 1889; 137 years ago

Technical
- Line length: 36.7 km (22.8 miles)
- Track gauge: 1,067 mm (3 ft 6 in)
- Electrification: 1,500 V DC, overhead catenary
- Operating speed: 95 km/h (59 mph)

The Kusatsu Line (草津線, Kusatsu-sen) is a railway line in western Japan operated by West Japan Railway Company (JR West). It connects Tsuge on the Kansai Main Line with Kusatsu on the Biwako Line (Tōkaidō Main Line).

== Overview ==
Kusatsu line mainly runs through area around Kōka City, on the mostly flat terrain along Somagawa and Yasu Rivers. Due to the long distance between consecutive stations, the scheduled speed is fast for a single-track train, with a top speed of 95 km/h. The symbol of the route is C.

== History ==
The Kansai Railway Co. opened the entire line in 1889/90, and was nationalised in 1907. The section of railway between Kusatsu Station and Tsuge Station received the name "Kusatsu Line" on October 12, 1909.

CTC signalling was commissioned in 1979, the line was electrified in 1980 and freight services ceased in 1987.

Construction of a new station, "Minami-Biwako", began in May 2006 and was planned to be completed in 2012. The station was proposed to allow passengers to transfer between the Tōkaidō Shinkansen and Kusatsu lines. However, in September 2006, the Otsu district court concluded that Ritto City issuing bonds to fund the station's construction was illegal under local finance law and the project was halted; the project was officially abandoned in October 2007.

== Stations ==
Station		km from Tsuge	Connections	Location	
Tsuge	柘植	0.0	Kansai Main Line	Iga, Mie Prefecture	
Aburahi	油日	5.3		Kōka	Shiga Prefecture
Kōka	甲賀	7.4		Kōka	Shiga Prefecture
Terashō	寺庄	10.5		Kōka	Shiga Prefecture
Kōnan	甲南	12.5		Kōka	Shiga Prefecture
Kibukawa	貴生川	15.3	■ Shigaraki Kōgen Railway Shigaraki Line ■ Ohmi Railway Main Line	Kōka	Shiga Prefecture
Mikumo	三雲	20.5		Konan	Shiga Prefecture
Kōsei	甲西	24.3		Konan	Shiga Prefecture
Ishibe	石部	27.6		Konan	Shiga Prefecture
Tehara	手原	32.7		Ritto	Shiga Prefecture
Kusatsu	草津	36.7	Tokaido Main Line (Biwako Line)	Kusatsu	Shiga Prefecture
Continuing service on the Biwako Line to Kyoto Station in mornings and evenings, and to Osaka Station in mornings only.

Train stops at all stations and operates as a local train within the line.

== See also ==
- List of railway lines in Japan
