= Tsuge Station =

Railway station in Iga, Mie Prefecture, Japan

Tsuge Station 柘植駅
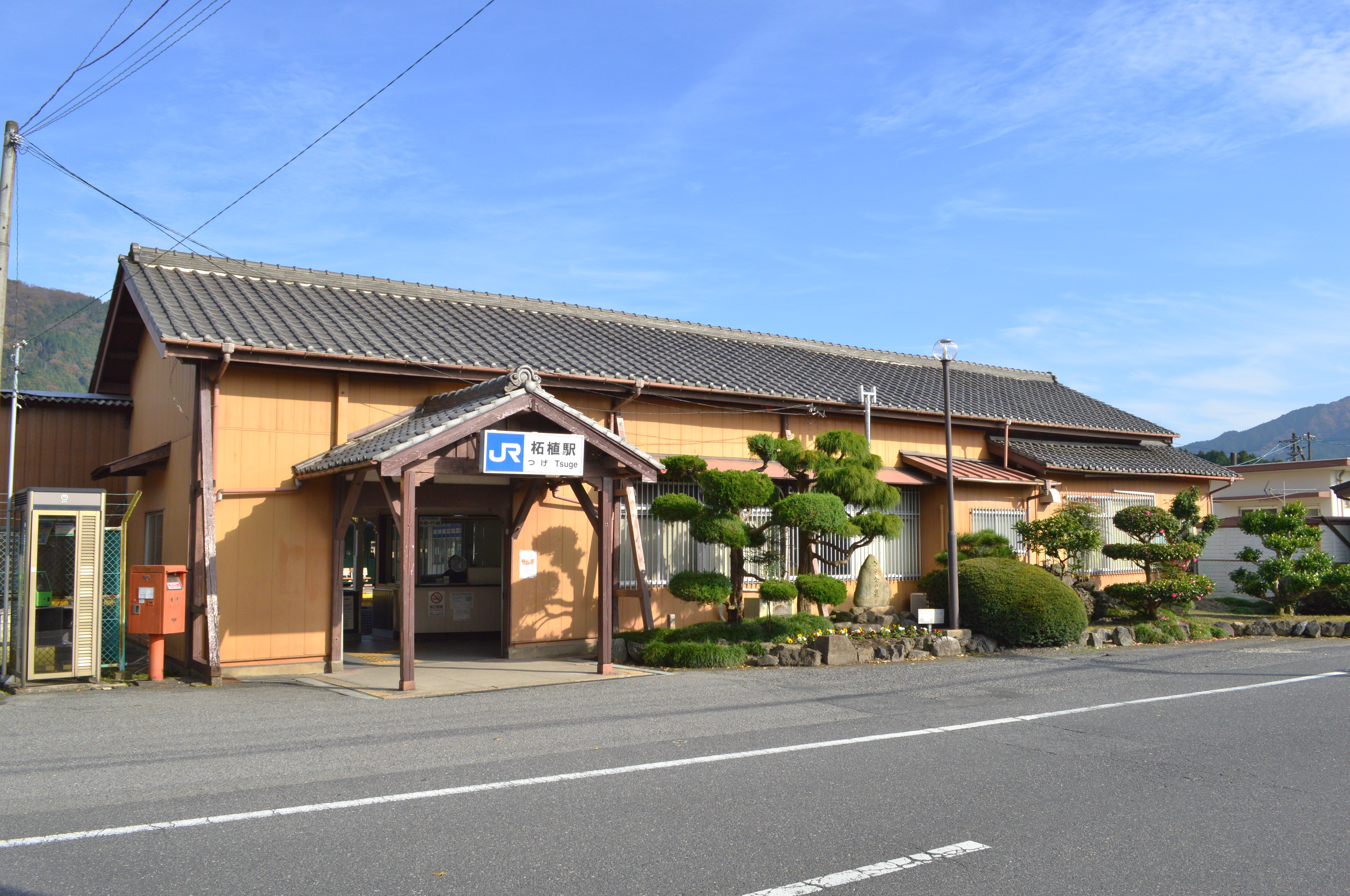
- Tsuge Station in November 2015

General information
- Location: 211 Tsuge-machi, Iga City, Mie Prefecture 519-1402; Japan
- Coordinates: 34°50′49″N 136°15′21″E
- Owner: JR West
- Operator: JR West
- Lines: V Kansai Line; C Kusatsu Line
- Distance: 20.0 km (12.4 mi) from Kameyama; 36.7 km (22.8 mi) from Kusatsu
- Platforms: 1 side platform and 1 island platform
- Tracks: 3

Construction
- Structure type: At grade
- Cycle facilities: Available
- Accessible: None

Other information
- Website: Official website

History
- Opened: 19 February 1890; 136 years ago
- Electrified: Kusatsu Line: 1980

Passengers
- FY 2023: 480 daily
Services
Preceding station	JRW	Following station
Shindō toward Kamo and Iga-Ueno	Kansai Line	Kabuto toward Kameyama
Shindō toward Kamo and Iga-Ueno	Kansai Line	Terminus
Aburahi toward Osaka, Kyoto, and Kusatsu	Kusatsu Line	Terminus
Location
- Location within Mie Prefecture Location within Kansai region Location within Japan

Tsuge Station (柘植駅, Tsuge-eki) is a junction passenger railway station of the West Japan Railway Company (JR-West) located in the city of Iga, Mie, Japan.

== Lines ==
Tsuge Station is served by the Kansai Main Line and is located 79.9 rail kilometers from the terminus of the line at Nagoya Station and 20.0 rail kilometers from Kameyama Station. It is also terminus of the Kusatsu Line and is 36.7 rail kilometers from the opposing terminus of that line at Kusatsu Station.

== Layout ==
The station consists of a side platform and an island platform with three tracks on the ground level, connected by a footbridge.

=== Platforms ===
1	■ Kansai Line	for Kamo and Iga-Ueno
2	■ Kansai Line	for Kameyama for Kamo (one train only)
2	■ Kusatsu Line	for Kyoto and Kusatsu (a few trains in the morning only)
3	■ Kusatsu Line	for Osaka and Kyoto, and Kusatsu
3	■ Kansai Line	for Kameyama (one train only)

== History ==
Tsuge Station was opened on February 18, 1890 with the extension of the Kansai Railway from Mikumo Station, making it the oldest station within Mie Prefecture. The Kansai Railway was extended to Yokkaichi Station on December 25, 1890 and to Ueno Station on January 15, 1897. The line was nationalized on October 1, 1907, becoming part of the Imperial Government Railways (IGR), which became Japan National Railways (JNR) after World War II. Freight operations were discontinued from August 1, 1972. With the privatization of JNR on April 1, 1987, the station came under the control of JR-West.

== Passenger statistics ==
In fiscal 2019, the station was used by an average of 308 passengers daily (boarding passengers only).

== Surrounding area ==
The old Iga Kaido highway and its post town remain to the south of the station, but there is no urban area around the station itself.

== See also ==
- List of railway stations in Japan
