= Minakuchi Castle =

- 水口城
- Kōka, Shiga Prefecture, Japan
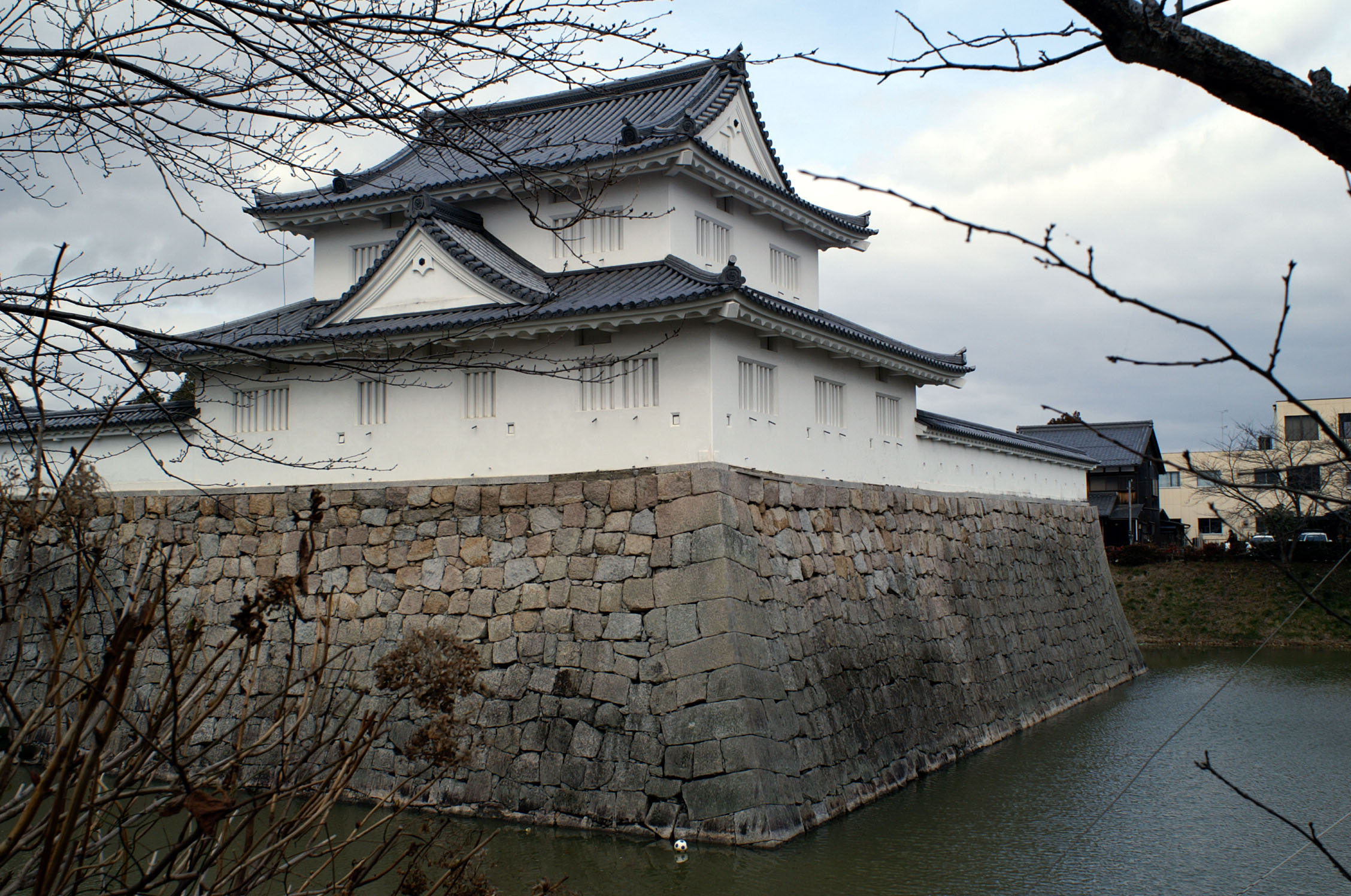
- Minakuchi Castle's reconstructed yagura

Site information
- Type: hirashiro-style Japanese castle
- Open to the public: yes
- Condition: partial reconstruction

Location
- Location within Shiga Prefecture Location within Japan
- Coordinates: 34°58′14″N 136°09′52″E

Site history
- Built: 1634
- Built by: Tokugawa Iemitsu
- In use: Edo period
- Demolished: 1871

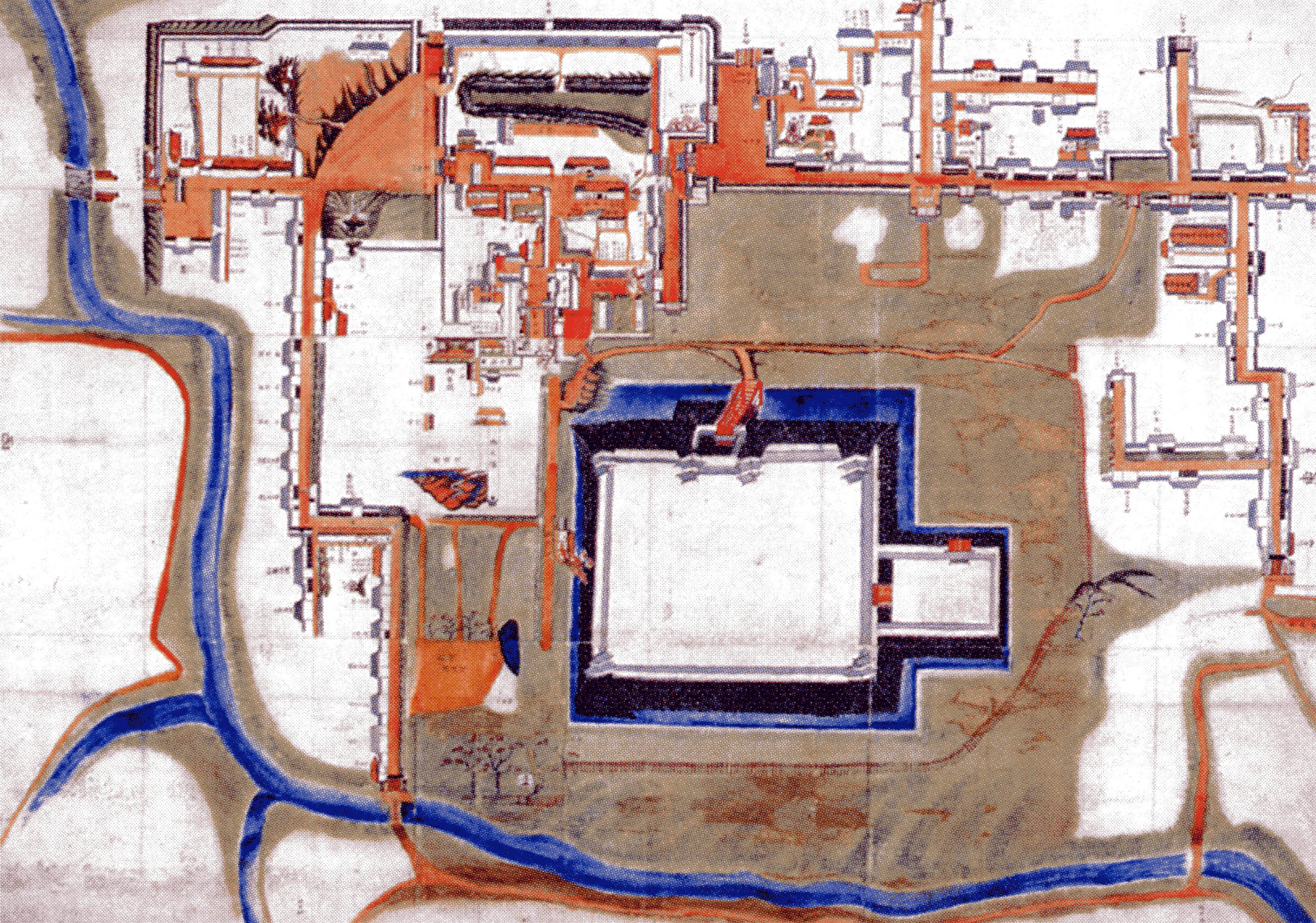
layout of Minakuchi Castle

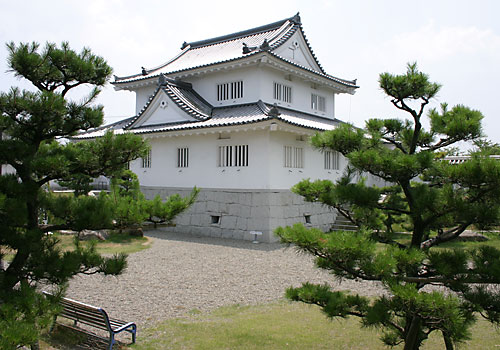
Another view of the yagura

Minakuchi Castle (水口城, Minakuchi-jō) is a hirashiro-style Japanese castle located in the former town of Minakuchi, in the city of Kōka, Shiga Prefecture, Japan. The castle is also known as Hekisui Castle

== Overview ==
Minakuchi Castle is located on the old Tōkaidō highway connecting Kyoto with Edo and the provinces of eastern Japan. This was the most important highway in Edo Period Japan, and in the early Edo period, a system of official post stations on the Tōkaidō was formalized by the Tokugawa shogunate in 1601. One such station was Minakuchi-juku, with one honjin, one waki-honjin, and 41 hatago, one Tonyaba, for the stabling of packhorses and warehousing of goods, and one kōsatsu for the display of official notifications.It was used by many western daimyō on sankin-kōtai route to-and-from the Shogun's court in Edo. However, in 1634, when Shogun Tokugawa Iemitsu decided to travel to Kyoto to meet the Emperor, an issue arose on where he would spend the night. Almost all of the route of the highway was either controlled directly by the shogunate or by trusted fudai daimyō, at whose castle's the Shogun could stay. However, in the portion of the route in southern Ōmi Province, after the abolition of Minakuchi Okayama Castle, there was no suitable accommodation. The distance from Suzuka Pass to Hikone Castle or Zeze Castle was too great for a single day, and it was unthinkable from a prestige and from a security standpoint for the Shogun to stay in the same hatago that was used by ordinary daimyō. The solution was to construct a new Japanese castle adjacent to Minaguchi-juku.

== Layout ==
The castle was patterned after the design of Nijō-jō in Kyoto. The central bailey is 150 meters square, surrounded by a moat. On the middle of the eastern side is a 20 meter square protrusion, which housed the composite gate. The sides of the enclosure were protected by stone walls, and there was a yagura watchtower at each corner. The one facing the highway was larger and was two-story; the others were single-story. The gardens were designed by Kobori Gonjūrō, son of the famed garden designer Kobori Enshū.

== History ==
This castle was actually used as a lodge for one night for Tokugawa Iemitsu’s visit to Kyoto in 1634, but was never used after that. In 1682, the shogunate created Minakuchi Domain for the Katō clan, and transferred control of the castle to the new domain. Katō Yoshiaki had been one of the most powerful generals under Toyotomi Hideyoshi and later under Tokugawa Ieyasu, and had been awarded with Aizu Domain. His son, Katō Akinari initially had a kokudaka of 400,000 koku, but through a combination of mismanagement, natural disasters and political intrigue, had been demoted and reassigned to a 10,000 koku smallholding in remote Iwami Province. His son, Kato Akitomo had managed to increase this to 20,000 koku and was rewarded with the creation of Minakuchi Domain. The Katō clan ruled the area (with a brief exception) to the end of the Edo Period. They kept the shogun's palace in repair, in the event that he should ever chose to return, but lived in a secondary area at the northwest of the castle.

After the Meiji restoration, the castle was destroyed and its buildings were sold off. The site of the castle was used as a baseball field and parking lot for Minakuchi High School. However, in 1991 some walls, two gates, and a yagura were reconstructed. This reconstructed yagura houses the Minakuchi History and Folklore Museum (水口歴史民俗 資料館, Minakuchi rekishi minzoku shiryōkan).

The castle is a five minutes walk from Minakuchi Jonan Station on the Ohmi Railway Main Line.

== Literature ==
- De Lange, William (2021). An Encyclopedia of Japanese Castles. Groningen: Toyo Press. pp. 600 pages. ISBN 978-9492722300.
- Schmorleitz, Morton S. (1974). Castles in Japan. Tokyo: Charles E. Tuttle Co. pp. 144–145. ISBN 0-8048-1102-4.
- Motoo, Hinago (1986). Japanese Castles. Tokyo: Kodansha. p. 200 pages. ISBN 0-87011-766-1.
- Mitchelhill, Jennifer (2004). Castles of the Samurai: Power and Beauty. Tokyo: Kodansha. p. 112 pages. ISBN 4-7700-2954-3.
- Turnbull, Stephen (2003). Japanese Castles 1540-1640. Osprey Publishing. p. 64 pages. ISBN 1-84176-429-9.
