= Tsuchiyama =

Tsuchiyama may refer to:

- 8044 Tsuchiyama, a main-belt asteroid
- Tsuchiyama-juku, one of the 52 Stations of the Tōkaidō
- Tsuchiyama, Shiga, a former town in Japan which merged into the city of Kōka in 2004
- Tsuchiyama Station, a railway station in Harima, Japan

== People with the surname ==
- Tamie Tsuchiyama (1915–1984), American anthropologist
