= Kanpo (disambiguation) =

Kanpo may refer to:

- Kanpō (寛保), the Japanese era from 1741 through 1744
- Kampō (漢方), the Japanese study and adaptation of Traditional Chinese medicine
- Kanpō (官報), the Japanese government gazette published since 1886
