= Minakuchi, Shiga =

Dissolved municipality in Shiga prefecture, Japan

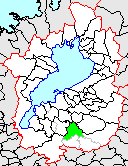
Location of Minakuchi

Minakuchi (水口町, Minakuchi-chō) was a town located in Kōka District, Shiga Prefecture, Japan.

As of 2004, the town had an estimated population of 38,864 and a density of 563.82 persons per km^{2}. The total area was 68.93 km^{2}.

On October 1, 2004, Minakuchi, along with the towns of Kōka, Kōnan, Shigaraki and Tsuchiyama (all from Kōka District), was merged to create the city of Kōka.

In the Edo period, it developed as a post town of Tokaido (Minakuchi-juku) and a castle town for Minakuchi Castle.
