= Minakuchi Ishibashi Station =

Railway station in Kōka, Shiga Prefecture, Japan

Minakuchi Ishibashi Station 水口石橋駅
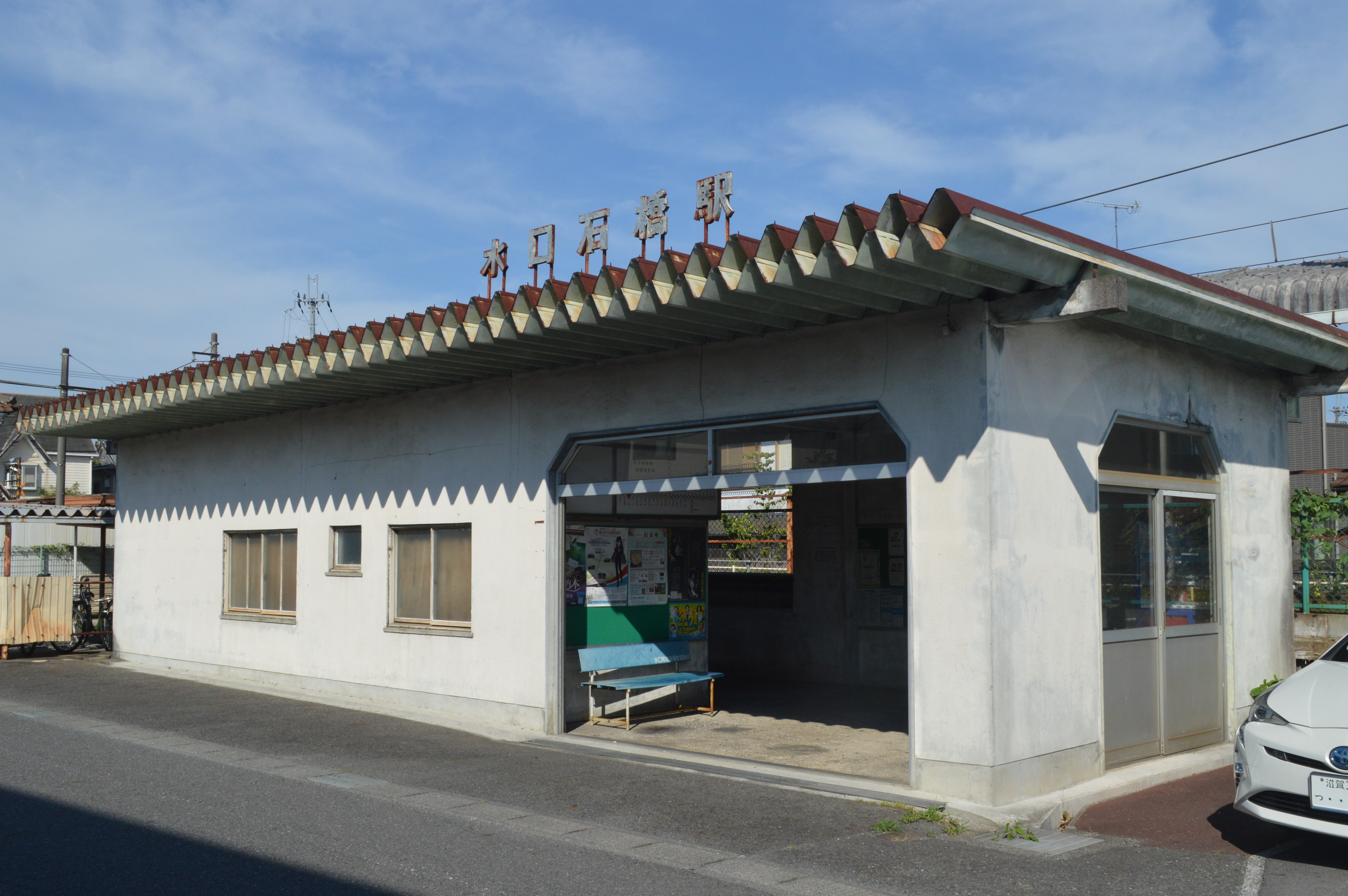
- Minakuchi Ishibashi Station, July 2021

General information
- Location: 2 Minakuchichō Rokushin, Kōka-shi, Shiga-ken 528-0014; Japan
- Coordinates: 34.9699°N 136.1718°E
- Operator: Ohmi Railway
- Line: ■ Ohmi Railway Main Line
- Distance: 44.4 km from Maibara
- Platforms: 1 side platform

Other information
- Station code: OR35
- Website: Official website

History
- Opened: August 16, 1957

Passengers
- FY2018: 60 daily
Location
- Location within Shiga Prefecture Location within Japan

Minakuchi Ishibashi Station (水口石橋駅, Minakuchi Ishibashi-eki) is a passenger railway station in located in the city of Kōka, Shiga Prefecture, Japan, operated by the private railway operator Ohmi Railway.

== Lines ==
Minakuchi Ishibashi Station is served by the Ohmi Railway Main Line, and is located 44.4 rail kilometers from the terminus of the line at Maibara Station.

== Station layout ==
The station consists of one side platform serving a single bi-directional track. The station is unattended.

== Platforms ==
■ Main Line	for Hikone and Maibara for Yokaichi, Kibukawa and Omi-Hachiman

== Adjacent stations ==
«	Service	»
Ohmi Railway Main Line
Minakuchi	Rapid	Minakuchi Jōnan
Minakuchi	Local	Minakuchi Jōnan

== History ==
Minakuchi Ishibashi Station was opened on August 16, 1957

== Passenger statistics ==
In fiscal 2018, the station was used by an average of 60 passengers daily.

== Surroundings ==
- Minakuchi-juku
- Shiga Prefecture Mizuguchi General Government Building
- Public Koka Hospital-The nearest station is Minakuchi Station next door
- Mizuguchi Child Care Support Center
- Shiga Central Forestry Association Headquarters

== See also ==
- List of railway stations in Japan
