= Minakuchi Okayama Castle =

Sengoku period castle in Kansai region, Japan

- 水口岡山城
- Kōka, Shiga Prefecture, Japan
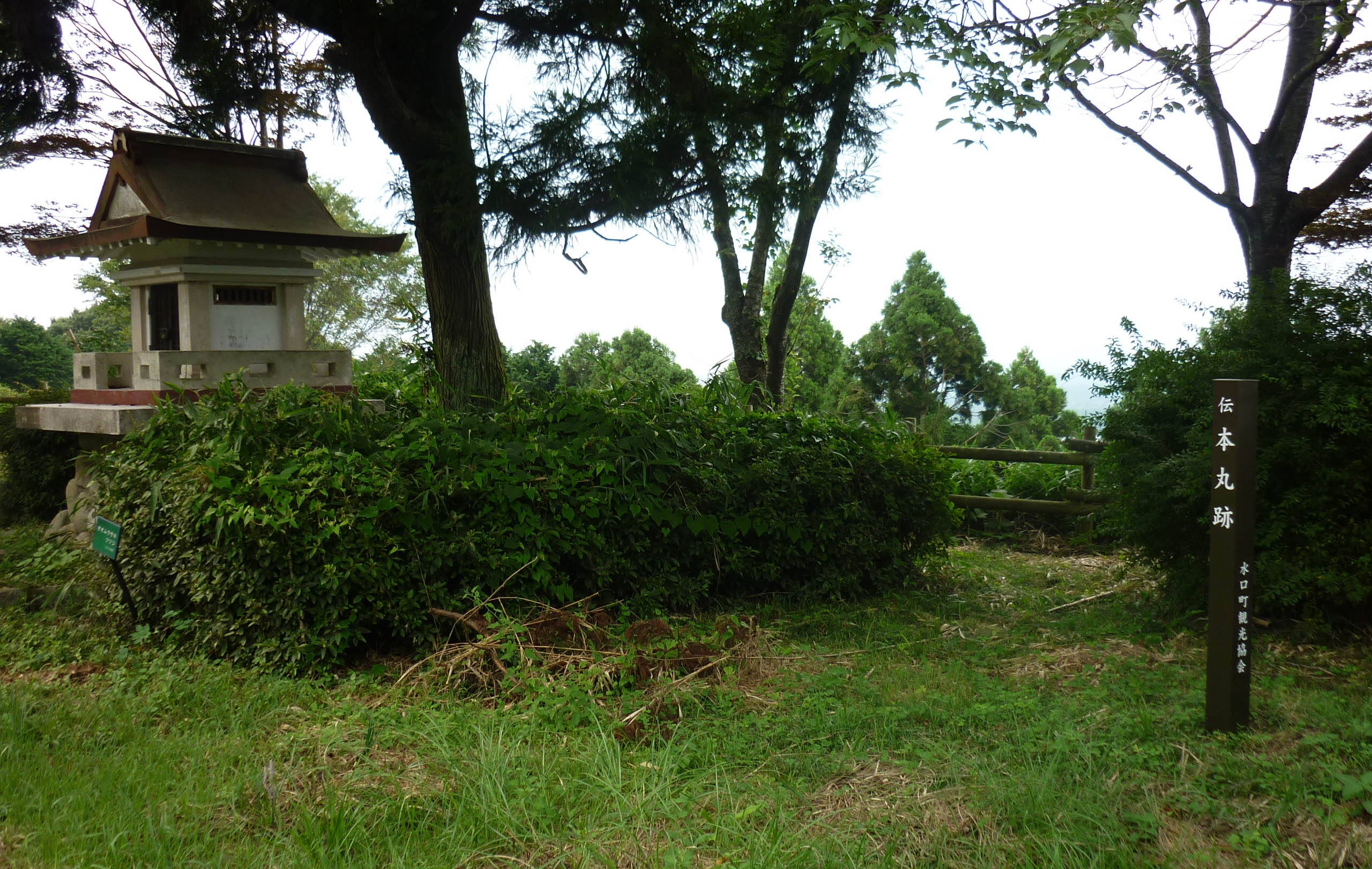
- Site of inner bailey Minakuchi Okayama Castle

Site information
- Type: hirayama-style Japanese castle
- Open to the public: yes (no public facilities)
- Condition: ruins

Location
- Minakuchi Okayama Castle
- Location within Shiga Prefecture Location within Japan
- Coordinates: 34°58′12.4″N 136°10′51.4″E

Site history
- Built: 1583
- Built by: Nakamura Kazuuji
- In use: Sengoku period
- Demolished: 1603

Minakuchi Okayama Castle (水口岡山城, Minakuchi Okayama jō) was a Sengoku period Japanese castle located in what is now the city of Kōka, Shiga Prefecture, in the Kansai region of Japan. Its ruins have been protected as a National Historic Site since 2017.

== History ==
During the Muromachi and Sengoku period, the area of Kōka was ruled by many autonomous petty lords. After Toyotomi Hideyoshi consolidated his rule over the area from 1583, he assigned the area to Nakamura Kazuuji, one of his most trusted generals and senior administrators. Nakamura chose a location on the 100-meter Mount Daiko in the eastern part of Minakami to be his stronghold. This point controlled where the Tōkaidō enters into Ōmi Province via the Suzuka Pass, and thus controlled access to Kyoto and Osaka from central and eastern Japan. It is also located on the junction of the Tōkaidō with a road to Shigaraki, and onwards to Nara. Nakamura ruled over a domain with a kokudaka of 60,000 koku. Following the Siege of Odawara (1590), he was awarded with Sunpu Castle, which had been vacated by Tokugawa Ieyasu, who had been ordered by Hideyoshi to transfer to the Kantō region.

As was typical of Japanese castles of this time, Minakuchi Okayama Castle consisted of a group of enclosures, protected by stone walls and dry moats, on the slopes of the hill, with the inner bailey at the summit, with a Yagura watchtower. The main gate was in the center of the southern slope, facing the Tōkaidō. Archaeological excavations have found the foundations of the gate and remnants of its stone walls.

Nakamura was replaced by Mashita Nagamori (1545-1615) in 1590, followed by Natsuka Masaie (1562-1600) in 1595. Both of these generals were very important officials within the Toyotomi administration, and this is an indication of the importance that Hideyoshi placed on this castle. During the Battle of Sekigahara, Natsuka was loyal to the Western Army under Ishida Mitsunari, but was unable to participate in any combat. After the battle, he returned to Minakuchi Okayama Castle, which came under attack by the forces of Ikeda Nagayoshi and Kamei Korenori. Natsuka surrendered the castle and was forced to commit seppuku.

After the establishment of the Tokugawa shogunate, the surrounding area was awarded as Minakuchi Domain, a fudai domain ruled by the Katō clan. Minakuchi Okayama Castle was ordered to be dismantled, and many of its stones were reused in the construction of the much smaller Minakuchi Castle.

The castle ruins are a 15-minute walk from Minakuchi Station on the Ohmi Railway.

== See also ==
- List of Historic Sites of Japan (Shiga)
