= Tenzo Okumura =

Japanese politician (born 1944)

- 奥村 展三
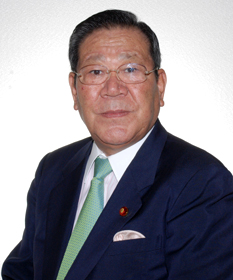
- Official portrait, 2011

Member of the House of Representatives
- In office 9 November 2003 – 16 November 2012
- Preceded by: Multi-member district
- Succeeded by: Takaya Mutō
- Constituency: Kinki PR (2003–2009); Shiga 4th (2009–2012)

Member of the House of Councillors
- In office 23 July 1995 – 2 June 2000
- Preceded by: Eiichi Nakamura
- Succeeded by: Hidetoshi Yamashita
- Constituency: Shiga at-large

Member of the Shiga Prefectural Assembly
- In office 1979–1995
- Constituency: Kōka District

Personal details
- Born: 10 August 1944 (age 82) Kōka, Shiga, Japan
- Party: DPP
- Other political affiliations: LDP (1979–1995); NPS (1995–2002); DPJ (2002–2016); DP (2016–2018)
- Relatives: Nobuyuki Okumura (grandson)
- Education: Ritsumeikan University

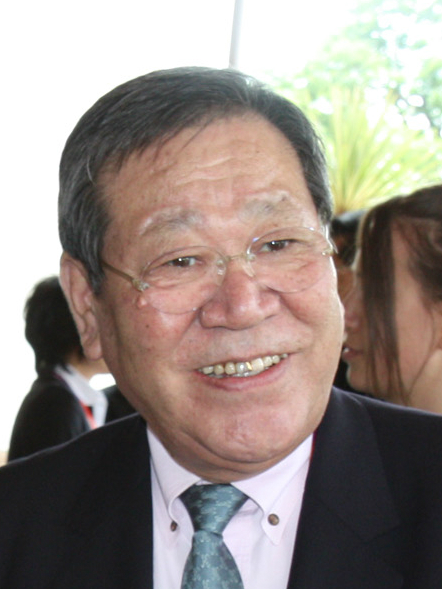
Okumura in 2012

Tenzo Okumura (奥村 展三, Okumura Tenzō; born 10 August 1944) is a former Japanese politician of the Democratic Party of Japan, who served as a member of both the House of Councillors and the House of Representatives in the Diet (national legislature). A native of Kōsei Town (today's Konan City, Shiga Prefecture) and dropout of Ritsumeikan University, he was elected to the town assembly of Kōsei, Shiga (serving for one term), to the Shiga Prefectural Assembly in 1979 (serving for four terms) and to the House of Councillors for the first time in 1995.
