= Minakuchi-juku =

Fiftieth of the 53 stations of the Tōkaidō

Minakuchi-juku 水口宿
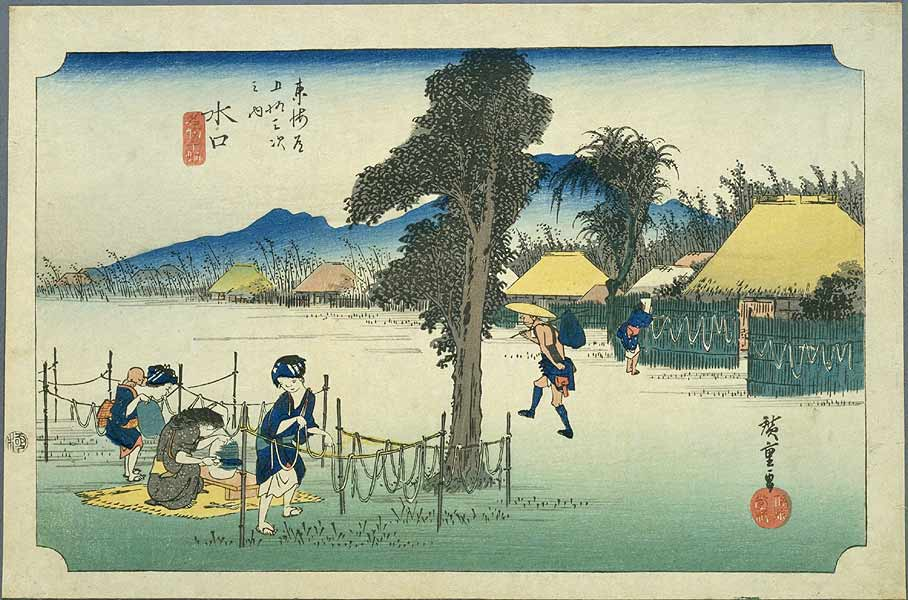
- Hiroshige's print of Minakuchi-juku, part of the Hōeidō edition The Fifty-three Stations of the Tōkaidō series

General information
- Location: Kōka, Shiga (former Ōmi Province); Japan
- Coordinates: 34°57′57.73″N 136°10′55.23″E
- Elevation: 182 m (597 ft)
- System: post station
- Line: Tōkaidō
- Distance: 443.8 km from Edo
Location
- Location within Shiga Prefecture Location within Japan

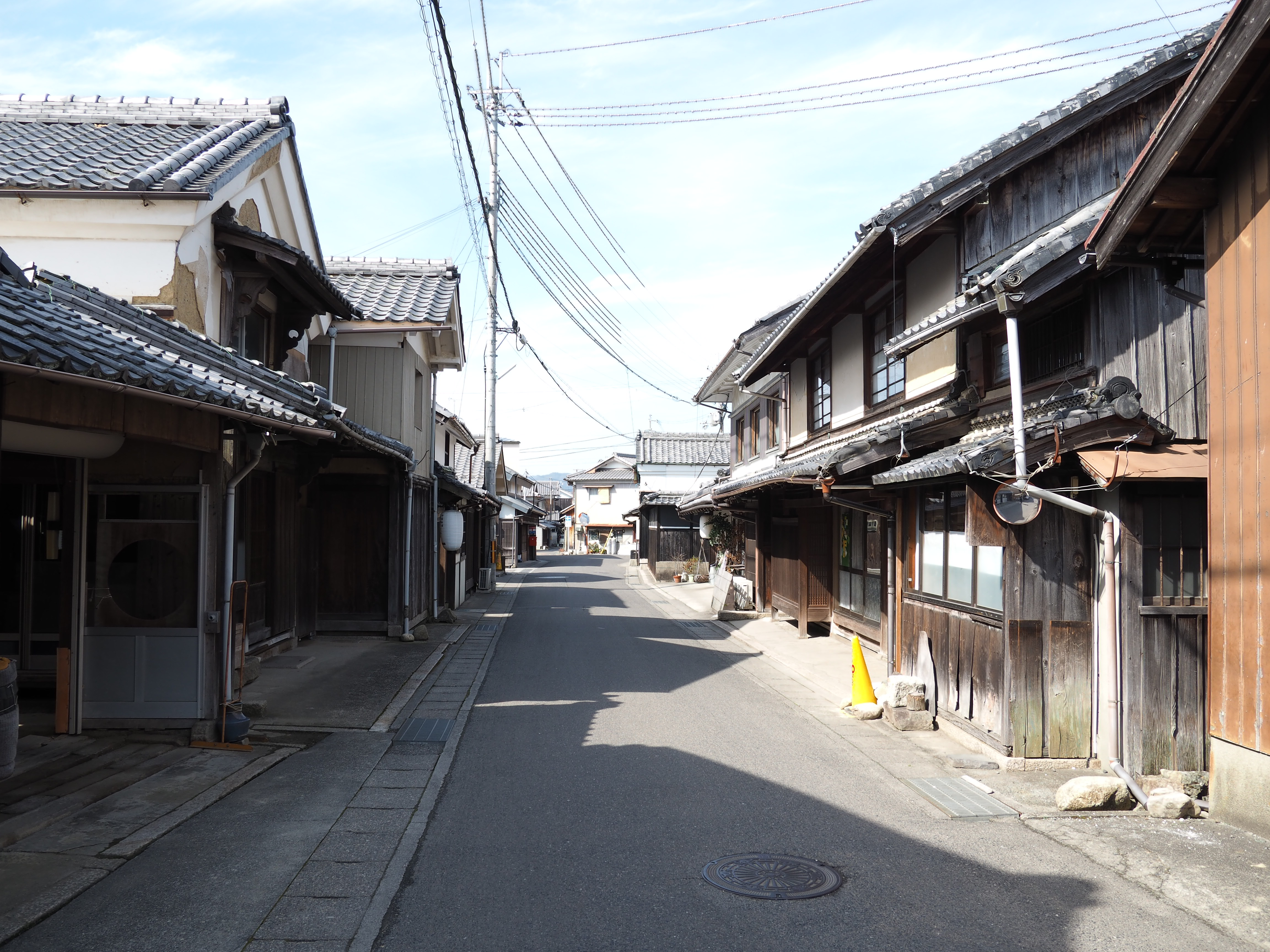
Modern Minakuchi-juku

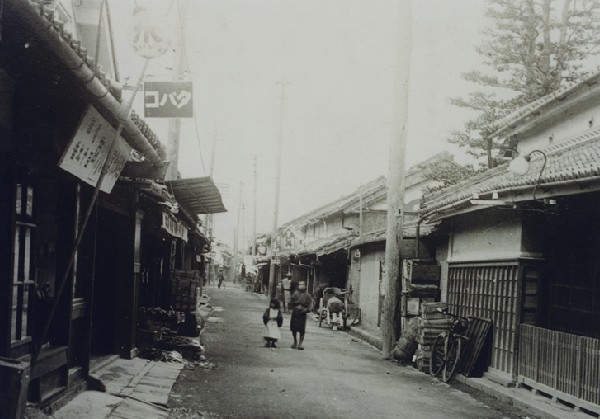
Minakuchi-juku in 1923

Minakuchi-juku (水口宿, Minakuchi-juku) was the fiftieth of the fifty-three stations of the Tōkaidō highway connecting Edo with Kyoto in Edo period Japan. It was located in the Minakuchi neighborhood of the present-day city of Kōka, Shiga Prefecture, Japan.

== History ==
Minakuchi-juku developed as early as the Muromachi period, as its location was convenient for travelers going to the Ise Grand Shrine and Ise Bay. In the early Edo period, the system of post stations on the Tōkaidō was formalized by the Tokugawa shogunate in 1601, Minakuchi-juku became an official post station. It was on the sankin-kōtai route by many western daimyō to-and-from the Shogun's court in Edo. Minakuchi Castle was constructed in 1634 on the western border of the town by Shogun Tokugawa Iemitsu as a way station where he could stay at during his travels between Edo and Kyoto. It was built in a similar fashion to Nijō Castle. Minakuchi was thus both a post station and a castle town, In 1682, Minakuchi Domain was created with a cadet branch of the Katō clan ruling until the Meiji restoration.

Per the 1843 "東海道宿村大概帳" (Tōkaidō Shukuson Taigaichō) guidebook issued by the Inspector of Highways (道中奉行, Dōchu-būgyō), the town had a population of 2692 in 692 houses, including one honjin, one waki-honjin, and 41 hatago. It had one Tonyaba, for the stabling of packhorses and warehousing of goods, and one kōsatsu for the display of official notifications. It was 443.8 kilometers from Edo.

Minakuchi was noted for three famous local products. Minakuchi-zaiku (水口細工) was a form of basketry made from woven wisteria vines, and occasionally from thin strips of wood. It formed lightweight containers which (amongst many other uses) could be used as a form of suitcase for travelers on the highway. Minakuchi-kiseru (水口煙管) was a pipe for smoking powdered tobacco, and was a popular souvenir for travelers to purchase. The production of kanpyō, dried shavings of a type of calabash, which was a popular ingredient in Edo period Japanese cuisine was the third local speciality.

== Minakuchi-juku in The Fifty-three Stations of the Tōkaidō ==
Utagawa Hiroshige's ukiyo-e Hōeidō edition print of Minakuchi-juku dates from 1833 -1834. The print depicts a straggling row of thatch-roofed structures. In the foreground are two women (one with a baby on her back) hanging up strips of kanpyō to dry on lines, while a third woman with a knife is peeling more from a calabash. More strips of drying kanpyō are shown on the fences of the buildings in the background. A solitary traveller is walking away from the viewer on the road.

== Neighboring post towns ==
Tōkaidō
Tsuchiyama-juku - Minakuchi-juku - Ishibe-juku
