= Kōsei, Shiga =

Dissolved municipality in Shiga Prefecture, Japan

Kōsei 甲西町
- Town
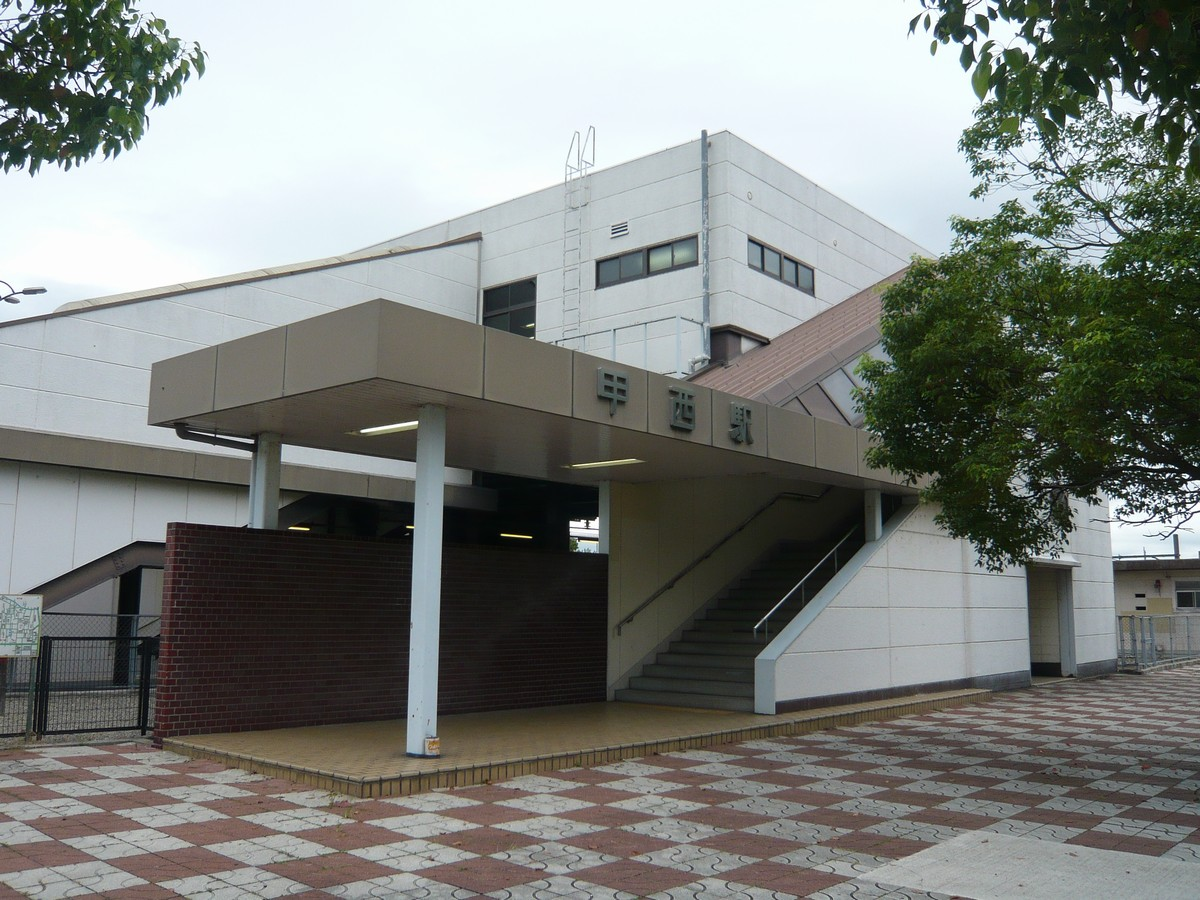
- Kōsei Station

- Flag Emblem

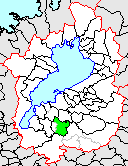

- Country: Japan
- Region: Kansai
- Prefecture: Shiga

Population (2003)
  - Total: 42,471
- Time zone: UTC+9 (Japan Standard Time)

Kōsei (甲西町, Kōsei-chō) was a town located in Kōka District, Shiga Prefecture, Japan. "Kōsei" means "western Kōka". As of 2003, the town had an estimated population of 42,471 and a density of 743.02 persons per km^{2}. The total area was 57.16 km^{2}. On October 1, 2004, Kōsei merged with the town of Ishibe (also from Kōka District) to create the city of Konan.

== Transport ==
=== Railway ===
JR West – Kusatsu Line

- Mikumo - Kōsei

== Twin towns ==
St. Johns, Michigan, United States.

== Notable people ==
- Tenzo Okumura, politician of the Democratic Party
