= Minakuchi Domain =

Minakuchi Domain 水口藩
- Domain of Japan
- 1682–1871
- Capital: Minakuchi Castle
- Area
  - Coordinates: 34°58′13.7″N 136°9′52.17″E
  - Type: Daimyō
- Historical era: Edo period
  - Established: 1682
  - Disestablished: 1871
- Today part of: part of Shiga Prefecture

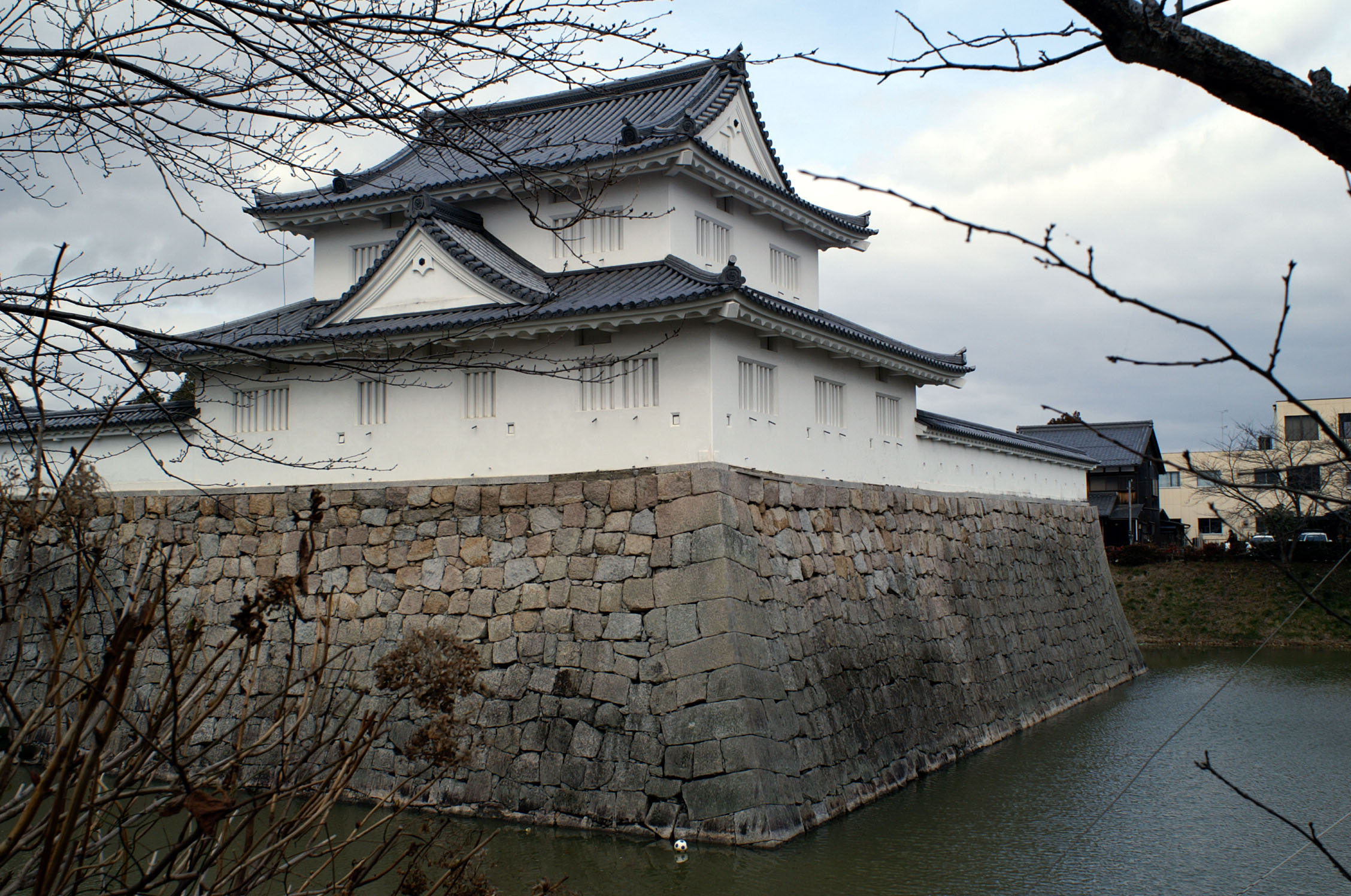
Minakuchi Castle

Minakuchi Domain (水口藩, Minakuchi-han) was a Fudai feudal domain under the Tokugawa shogunate of Edo period Japan. It was located in southeastern Ōmi Province, in the Kansai region of central Honshu. The domain was centered at Minakuchi Castle, located in what is now the city of Kōka in Shiga Prefecture.

== History ==
Under Toyotomi Hideyoshi, Natsuka Masaie, one of the Go-Bugyō entrusted with the succession of Toyotomi Hideyori was granted a 50,000 koku fief in Ōmi Province. His kokudaka was later raised to 120,000 koku and he was based at Minakuchi Okayama Castle. However, he committed seppuku after the defeat of the Western Army at the Battle of Sekigahara and his territory was seized as tenryō by the new Tokugawa shogunate. In 1682, Minakuchi Domain was created for Kato Akitomo, a grandson of Tokugawa Ieyasu's famed general, Kato Yoshiaki and daimyō of the 10,000 koku Yoshinaga Domain in Iwami Province. He had amassed an additional 10,000 koku due to his own achievements, and was thus granted a total kokudaka of 20,000 koku. He brought in Kobori Enshū to help design the gardens of his new Minakuchi Castle. His son, Kato Akihide, served as jisha-bugyō followed by wakadoshiyori with a raise in kokudaka to 50,000 koku and a transfer to Mibu Domain in Shimotsuke Province in 1695. He was followed by Torii Tadateru who followed the same career path and was likewise transferred to Mibu Domain in 1712. Minakuchi Domain was then awarded back to an adopted son of Kato Akihide, who was demoted back from Mibu Domain and reduced to 25,000 koku. His descendants continued to rule Minakuchi until the Meiji restoration. In July 1871, with the abolition of the han system, Minakuchi Domain became Minakuchi Prefecture, and was merged into the newly created Shiga Prefecture in September 1871.

== List of daimyō ==
#	Name	Tenure	Courtesy title	Court Rank	kokudaka
Kato clan, 1682-1695 (Tozama)
1	Kato Akitomo (加藤明友)	1682–1683	Kura-no-suke (内蔵助)	Junior 5th Rank, Lower Grade (従五位下)	20,000 koku
2	Kato Yoshihide (加藤明英)	1683–1695	Etchū-no-kami (越中守)	Junior 5th Rank, Lower Grade (従五位下)	20,000 koku
Torii clan, 1695-1712 (Fudai)
1	Torii Tadateru (鳥居忠英)	1695–1712	Iga-no-kami (伊賀守)	Junior 5th Rank, Lower Grade (従五位下)	20,000 koku
Kato clan, 1712 -1871 (Tozama Fudai)
1	Kato Yoshinori (加藤嘉矩)	1712–1724	Izumi-no-kami (和泉守)	Junior 5th Rank, Lower Grade (従五位下)	25,000 koku
2	Kato Yoshitsune (加藤明経)	1724–1746	Ise-no-kami (伊勢守)	Junior 5th Rank, Lower Grade (従五位下)	25,000 koku
3	Kato Yoshihiro (加藤明煕)	1746–1767	Sagami-no-kami (相模守)	Junior 5th Rank, Lower Grade (従五位下)	25,000 koku
4	Kato Yoshitaka (加藤明堯)	1767–1778	Ise-no-kami (伊勢守)	Junior 5th Rank, Lower Grade (従五位下)	25,000 koku
5	Kato Yoshinobu (加藤明陳)	1778–1799	Sado-no-kami (佐渡守)	Junior 5th Rank, Lower Grade (従五位下)	25,000 koku
6	Kato Akimasa (加藤明允)	1799–1815	Etchū-no-kami (越中守)	Junior 5th Rank, Lower Grade (従五位下)	25,000 koku
7	Kato Akikuni (加藤明邦)	1815–1845	Noto-no-kami (能登守)	Junior 5th Rank, Lower Grade (従五位下)	25,000 koku
8	Kato Akinori (加藤明軌)	1845–1866	Etchū-no-kami (越中守)	Junior 5th Rank, Lower Grade (従五位下)	25,000 koku
9	Kato Akizane (加藤明実)	1866–1871	Noto-no-kami (能登守) (越中守)	Senior 3rd Rank (正三位)	25,000 koku

== Bakumatsu period holdings ==
As with most domains in the han system, Minakuchi Domain consisted of a discontinuous territories calculated to provide the assigned kokudaka, based on periodic cadastral surveys and projected agricultural yields.

- Ōmi Province
  - 35 villages in Kōka District
  - 7 villages in Gamō District
  - 4 villages in Sakata District

== See also ==
- List of Han
