= Ishibe, Shiga =

Ishibe 石部町
- Town
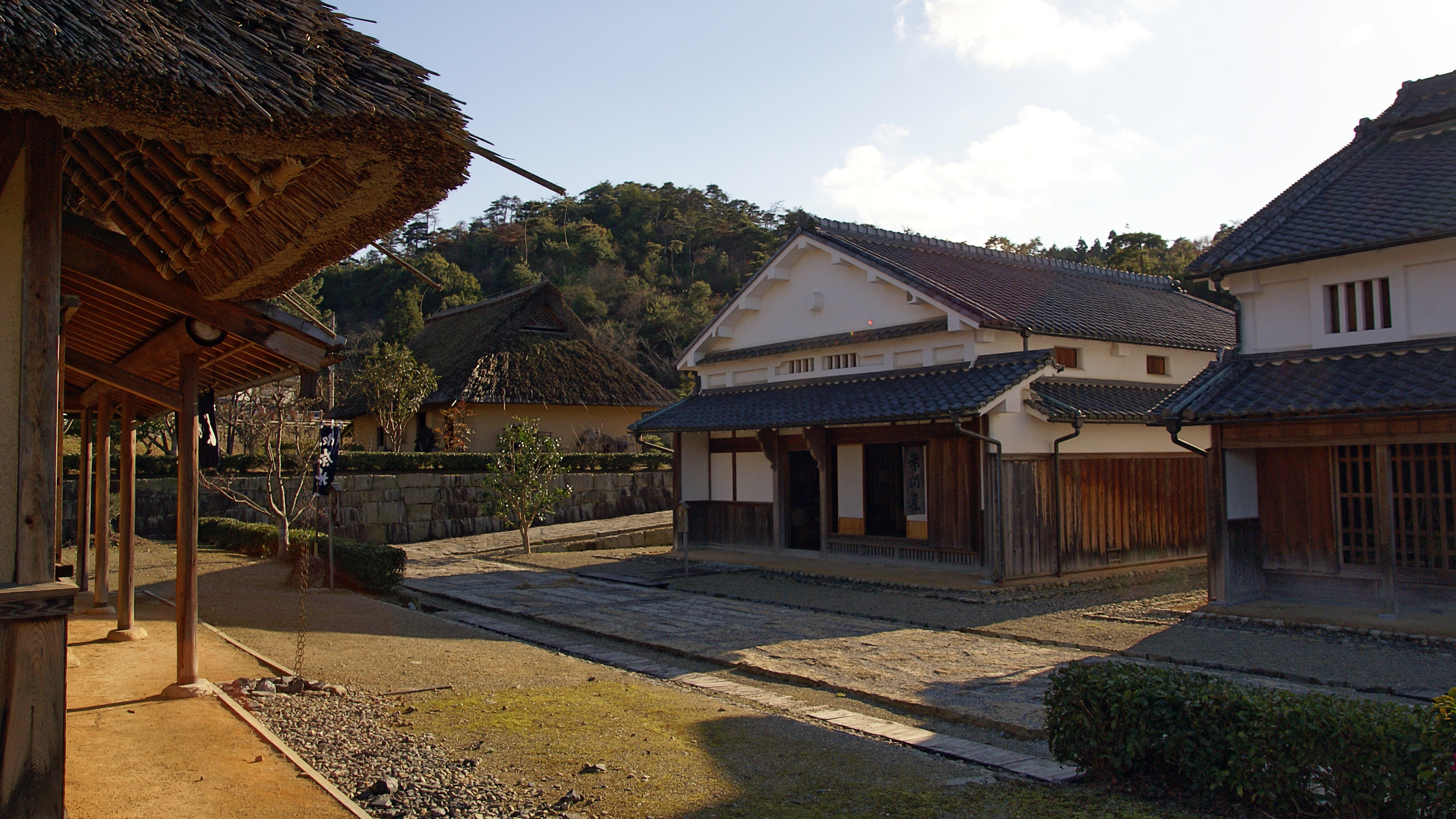
- A street in Ishibe

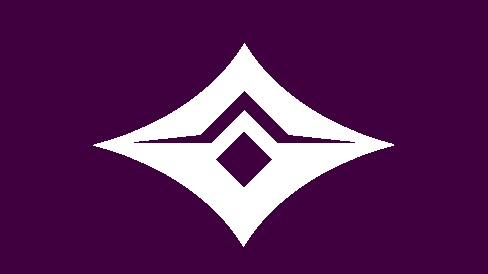
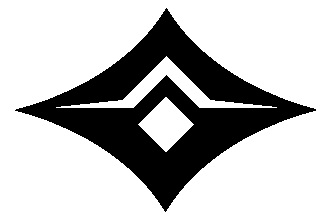
- Flag Emblem

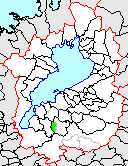
- Location of Ishibe in Shiga

- Country: Japan
- Region: Kansai
- Prefecture: Shiga

Area
  - Total: 13.33 km^{2} (5.15 sq mi)

Population (2003)
  - Total: 12,418
  - Density: 931.58/km^{2} (2,412.8/sq mi)
- Time zone: UTC+9 (Japan Standard Time)

Ishibe (石部町, Ishibe-chō) was a town located in Kōka District, Shiga Prefecture, Japan.

On October 1, 2004, Ishibe, along with the town of Kōsei (also from Kōka District), was merged to create the city of Konan. An NSK Bearings plant is located here.

== Demographics ==
As of 2003, the town had an estimated population of 12,418 and a density of 931.58 persons per km^{2}. The total area was 13.33 km^{2}

== History ==
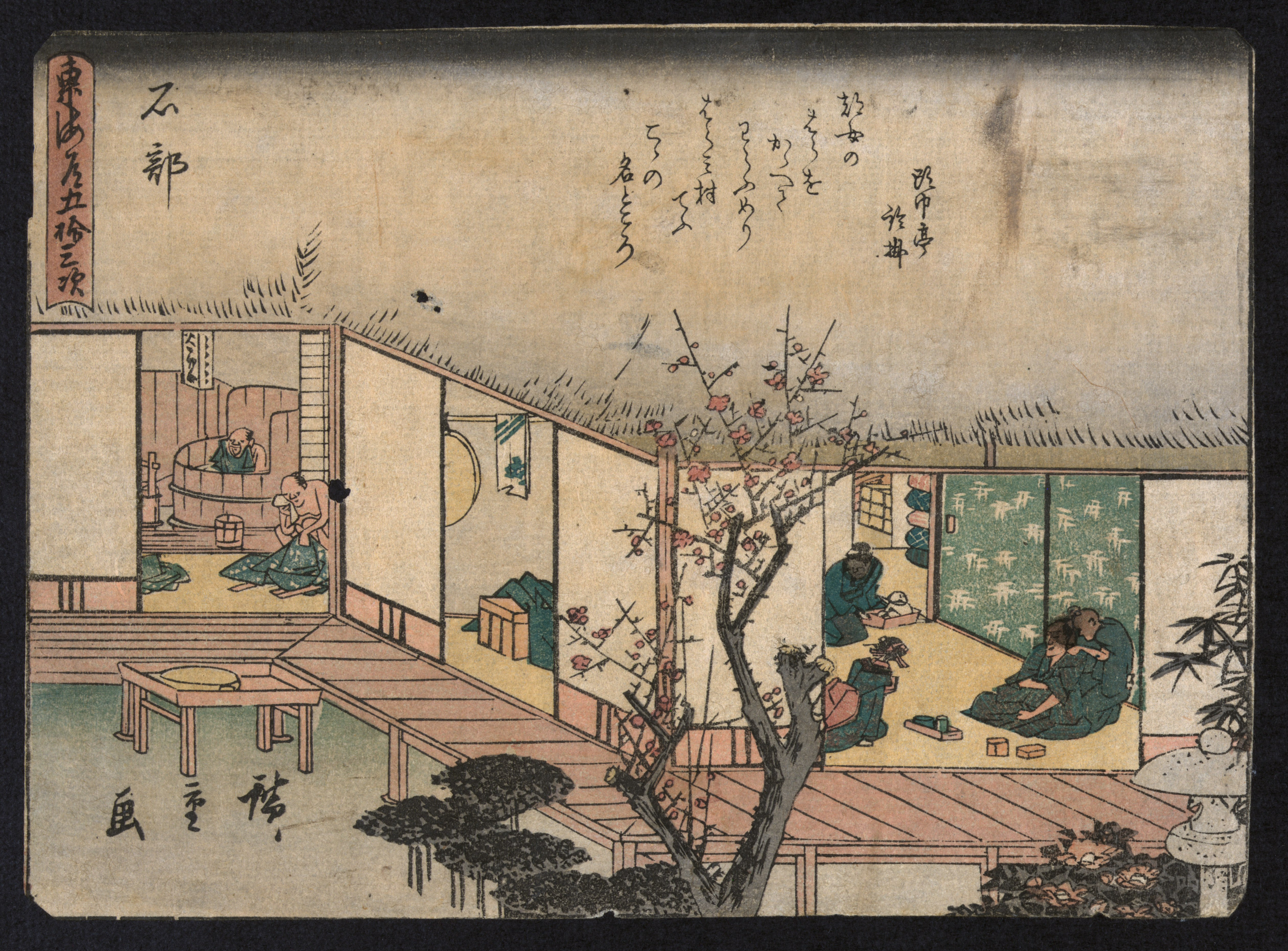
Edo period artwork of Ishibe-juku

During the Edo period, one of the 53 Stations of Tōkaidō road was found in the town, called Ishibe-juku. These post stations, or Shukuba, allowed travellers to rest on their journey and present their travelling permits.
