= Tsuchiyama-juku =

Forty-ninth of the 53 stations of the Tōkaidō

Tsuchiyama-juku 土山宿
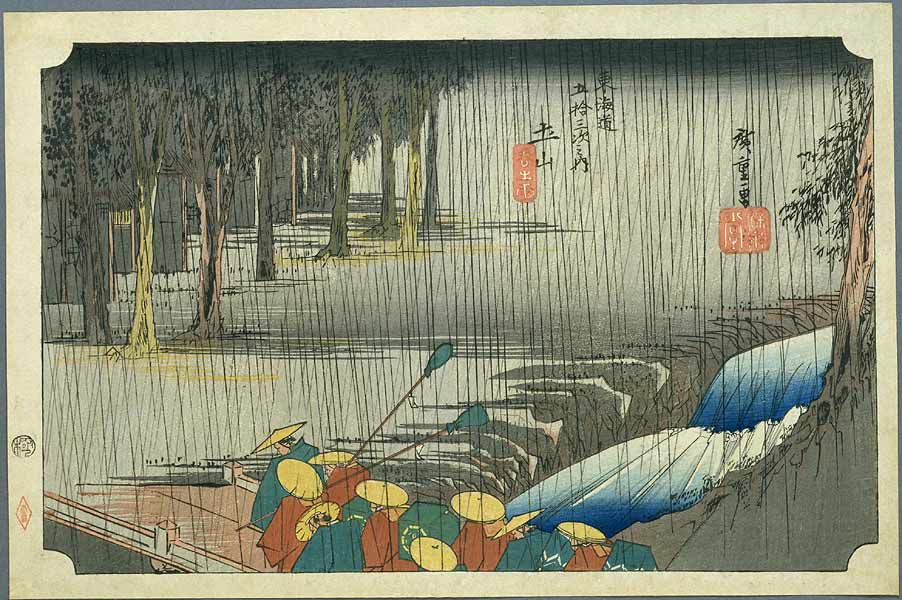
- Hiroshige's print of Tsuchiyama-juku, part of the Hōeidō edition The Fifty-three Stations of the Tōkaidō series

General information
- Location: Kōka, Shiga (former Ōmi Province); Japan
- Coordinates: 34°56′05.77″N 136°16′58″E
- Elevation: 250 m (820 ft)
- System: post station
- Line: Tōkaidō
- Distance: 433.2 km from Edo
Location
- Location within Shiga Prefecture Location within Japan

Tsuchiyama-juku (土山宿, Tsuchiyama-juku) was the forty-ninth of the fifty-three stations of the Tōkaidō highway connecting Edo with Kyoto in Edo period Japan. It was located in the Tsuchiyama neighborhood of the present-day city of Kōka, Shiga Prefecture, Japan.

== History ==
Tsuchiyama-juku is located on the main route from Kyoto to the Ise Grand Shrine, and developed from the Heian period as a good location for travelers to pause before attempting the steep Suzuka Pass. During the Kamakura period, traffic on the road between Kyoto and Kamakura increased, not only for samurai, but also for merchants and priests. In the early Edo period, the system of post stations on the Tōkaidō was formalized by the Tokugawa shogunate in 1601, Tsuchiyama-juku became an official post station. It was on the sankin-kōtai route by many western daimyō to-and-from the Shogun's court in Edo.

Per the 1843 "東海道宿村大概帳" (Tōkaidō Shukuson Taigaichō) guidebook issued by the Inspector of Highways (道中奉行, Dōchu-būgyō), the town had a population of 1505 in 351 houses, including two honjin, and 44 hatago. It had one Tonyaba, for the stabling of packhorses and warehousing of goods, and one kōsatsu for the display of official notifications. It was 433.2 kilometers from Edo.

On November 6, 1868, while making the journey from Kyoto to the newly proclaimed capital of Tokyo for the first time, Emperor Meiji celebrated his 16th birthday at Tsuchiyama-juku. However, soon after the Meiji restoration, the steep grade of the Suzuka Pass proved to be too much for the steam locomotives on the new Tōkaidō Main Line railway, and the line was routed to the west, bypassing Tsuchiyama, which fell into obscurity.

== Tsuchiyama-juku in The Fifty-three Stations of the Tōkaidō ==
Utagawa Hiroshige's ukiyo-e Hōeidō edition print of Tsuchiyama-juku dates from 1833 -1834. The print depicts a daimyō procession crossing a raging torrent in a downpour. The men are wearing hats and raincoats, and are looking downward as they struggle across a wooden bridge. The post station is in the upper left corner: an unwelcoming row of dark buildings half hidden by a forbidding row of dark trees. This motif comes from an Edo Period min'yō folk song about the Suzuka pass which was popular with packhorse handlers: "The slopes are shining, the hills are cloudy, and the earthen mountains rain", with "earthen mountains" as the literal translation of "Tsuchiyama".

== Neighboring post towns ==
Tōkaidō
Sakashita-juku - Tsuchiyama-juku - Minakuchi-juku
