= Kōnan, Shiga =

Town in Shiga, Japan

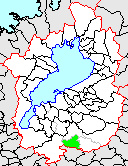
Location of Konan

Kōnan (甲南町, Kōnan-chō) was a town located in Kōka District, Shiga Prefecture, Japan. "Kōnan" means "southern Kōka".

As of 2004, the town has an estimated population of 20,118 and a density of 408.07 persons per km^{2}. The total area is 49.3 km^{2}.

On October 1, 2004, Kōnan, along with the towns of Kōka, Minakuchi, Shigaraki and Tsuchiyama (all from Kōka District), was merged to create the city of Kōka.
