= Tarumi Saiō Tongū Site =

- 垂水斎王頓宮跡 (Japanese)
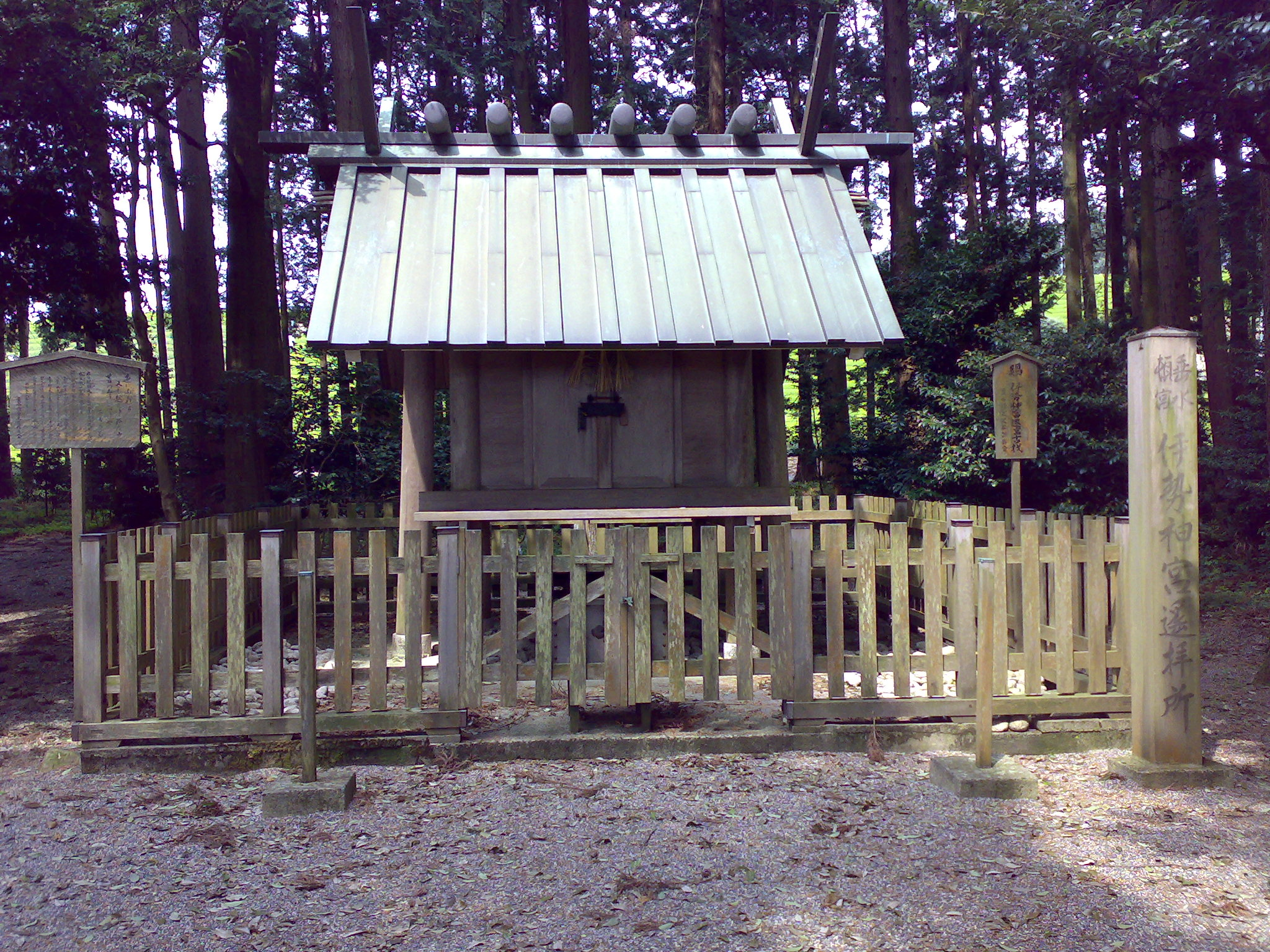
- Tarumi Saiō Tongū Site

- Tarumi Saiō Tongū Site Tarumi Saiō Tongū Site (Japan)
- 34°56′21″N 136°15′54″E
- Periods: Heian period
- Location: Kōka, Shiga, Japan
- Region: Kansai region

Site notes
- Public access: Yes (no facilities)

The Tarumi Saiō Tongū Site (垂水斎王頓宮跡, Tarumi Saiō tongū ato) is the location of a temporary palace erected in the Heian period in what is now the city of Kōka, Shiga Prefecture in the Kansai region of Japan. The site was designated a National Historic Site of Japan in 1944.

== Overview ==
The Tarumi Saiō Tongū Site is located at the foot of a hill overlooking the Yokota River. During the Heian period, the Saiō was an unmarried female member of the Japanese Imperial Family sent to serve as High Priestess at Ise Grand Shrine. This practice continued from the late 7th century until the 14th century. Once a Saiō was chosen, she would travel from Kyoto to the Saikū, the Saiō's official residence in Ise, in a procession that was the largest of its kind in Japan for its time. Up to 500 people would set out from Kyoto as a part of her retinue for the six-day-and-five-night journey. From Kyoto, the procession travelled in an eastward direction, stopping at Seta, Kōka, Tarumi, Suzuka and Ichishi, and a "Tongū", or temporary accommodation for the Saiō was constructed at each location. The Tarumi Saiō Tongū was used from 886 AD. At present, there is only a small remnant of an embankment and a well. The site is located a five-minute walk from the "Shirakawabashi" bus stop on the Kōka City Community Bus from Kibukawa Station on the JR West Kusatsu Line.

== See also ==
- List of Historic Sites of Japan (Shiga)
