= Kōka, Shiga (town) =

Dissolved municipality in Shiga prefecture, Japan

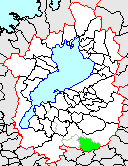
Location of Koka

Kōka (甲賀町, Kōka-chō) was a town located in Kōka District, Shiga Prefecture, Japan.

As of 2004, the town had an estimated population of 11,630 and a density of 161.89 persons per km^{2}. The total area was 49.3 km^{2} (19 sq mi).

On October 1, 2004, Kōka absorbed the towns of Kōnan, Minakuchi, Shigaraki and Tsuchiyama (all from Kōka District) to create the city of Kōka.
