= Minakuchi Jōnan Station =

Railway station in Kōka, Shiga Prefecture, Japan

Minakuchi Jōnan Station 水口城南駅
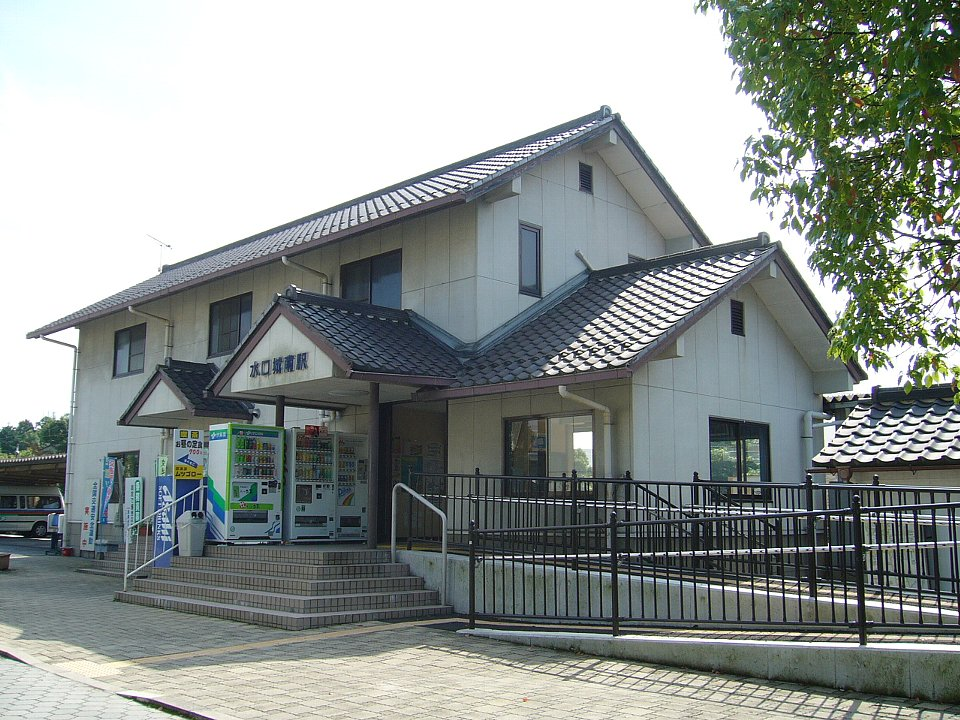
- Minakuchi Jōnan Station, October 2006

General information
- Location: Minakuchichō Minakuchi, Kōka-shi, Shiga-ken 528-0005; Japan
- Coordinates: 34.9684°N 136.1656°E
- Operator: Ohmi Railway
- Line: ■ Ohmi Railway Main Line
- Distance: 45.1 km from Maibara
- Platforms: 1 side platform

Other information
- Station code: OR36
- Website: Official website

History
- Opened: April 5, 1989

Passengers
- FY2018: 534 daily
Location
- Location within Shiga Prefecture Location within Japan

Minakuchi Jōnan Station (水口城南駅, Minakuchi Jōnan-eki) is a passenger railway station in located in the city of Kōka, Shiga Prefecture, Japan, operated by the private railway operator Ohmi Railway.

== Lines ==
Minakuchi Jōnan Station is served by the Ohmi Railway Main Line, and is located 45.1 rail kilometers from the terminus of the line at Maibara Station.

== Station layout ==
The station consists of one side platform serving a single bi-directional track. The station building is a two-story wooden structure, which is staffed during daytime hours.

== Platforms ==
■ Main Line	for Hikone and Maibara for Yokaichi, Kibukawa and Omi-Hachiman

== Adjacent stations ==
«	Service	»
Ohmi Railway Main Line
Minakuchi Ishibashi	Rapid	Kibukawa
Minakuchi Ishibashi	Local	Kibukawa

== History ==
Minakuchi Jōnan Station was opened on April 5, 1989.

== Passenger statistics ==
In fiscal 2018, the station was used by an average of 534 passengers daily.

== Surroundings ==
- Koka City Office
- Minakuchi Post Office
- Koka City Mizuguchi Library
- Shiga Prefectural Mizuguchi High School

== See also ==
- List of railway stations in Japan
