= Kanpō (Japanese government gazette) =

Government gazette of Japan

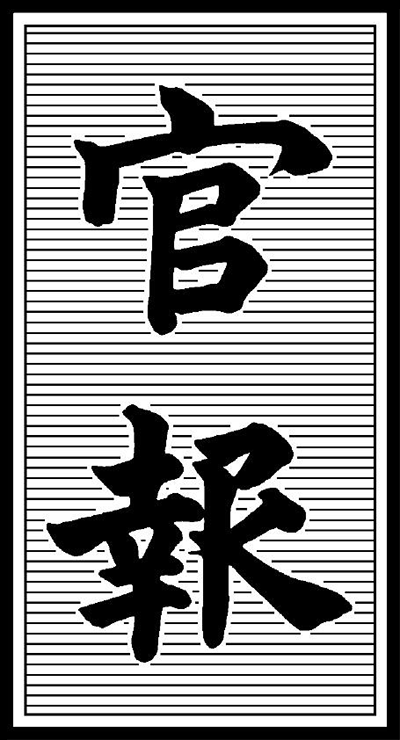
- The logo of the Kanpō, the Japanese government gazette

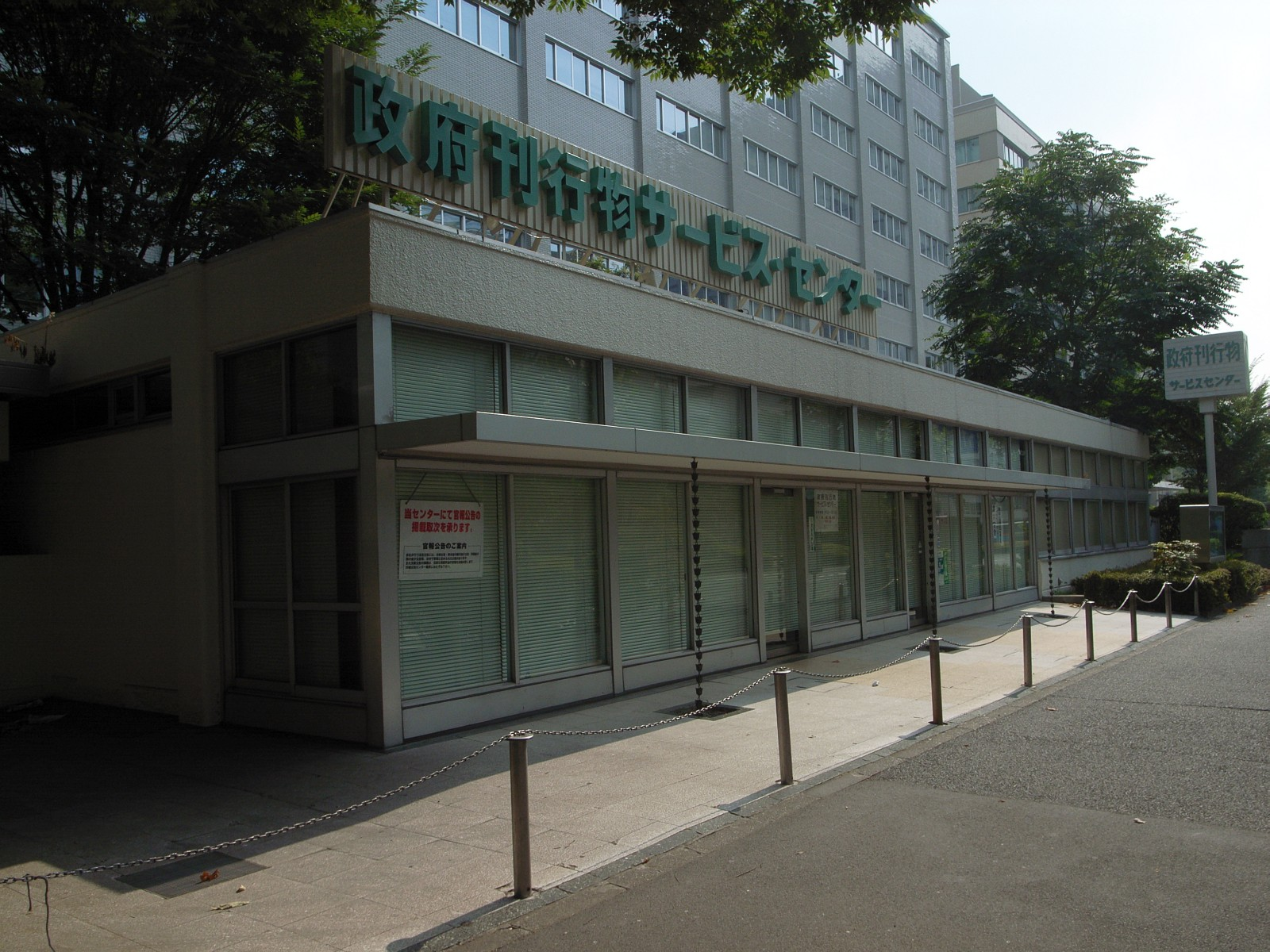
- The former Government Publications Service Center at Kasumigaseki, Tokyo
- Native name: 官報
- Type: Daily government gazette
- Format: paper (until March 31, 2025); website (from April 1, 2025)
- Owner: Government of Japan
- Founder: Government of the Empire of Japan
- Publisher: National Printing Bureau (until March 31, 2025); Cabinet Office (from April 1, 2025)
- President: Sanae Takaichi (Prime Minister of Japan)
- Founded: July 2, 1883; 143 years ago
- Language: Japanese
- Headquarters: 1-6-1 Nagata-cho, Chiyoda-ku, Tokyo 100-8914, Japan
- Country: Japan
- Website: www.kanpo.go.jp

Kanpō (Japanese: 官報, literally "Official report") is the official gazette of the Japanese government. Its official publication started in 1886, from the National Printing Bureau of the Ministry of Finance.

Japanese people historically relied on the kōsatsu, a wooden plaque placed at shukuba and other important places, to learn of proclamations made by either the shogun or the local daimyo. As the literacy rate improved and the modern nation emerged under the Meiji government, the kōsatsu was abolished in 1873 and eventually replaced by the Kanpō, the Japanese government gazette, which is now available on the Internet.

Until March 31, 2025, Kanpō was printed by the National Printing Office in accordance with customary law. From April 1, 2025, it has been published online by the Cabinet Office, now in accordance with statutory law.

== See also ==
- Public notice
- Kōsatsu
