= Shigaraki, Shiga =

Dissolved municipality in Shiga prefecture, Japan

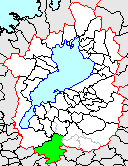
Location of Shigaraki

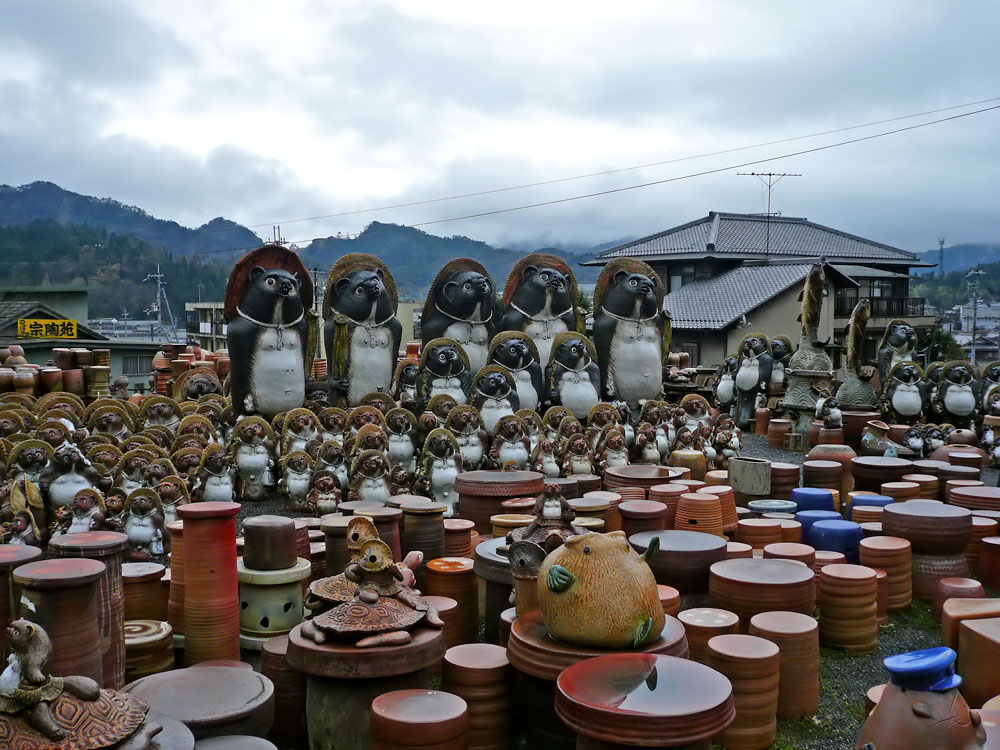
Tanuki pottery in Shigaraki

Shigaraki (信楽町, Shigaraki-chō) was a town located in Kōka District, Shiga Prefecture, Japan.

== Population ==
As of 2004, the town had an estimated population of 13,885 and a density of 84.92 persons per km^{2}. The total area is 163.5 km^{2}.

== History ==
On October 1, 2004, Shigaraki, along with the towns of Kōka, Kōnan, Minakuchi and Tsuchiyama (all from Kōka District), was merged to create the city of Kōka.

It also served as the imperial capital for several months in 745, before moving to Heijō-kyō due to a forest fire destroying the palace (Shigaraki Palace).

== Pottery ==
Shigaraki is famous for its ceramic kilns since ancient times. The area is known for its clay beds, and locally mined clay is often used by local potters. Works produced here are known as Shigaraki-yaki. Many local potters use wood fired anagama kilns. Many tanuki statues are also produced here.

== Climate ==
Climate data for Shigaraki (1991−2020 normals, extremes 1978−present)
Month	Jan	Feb	Mar	Apr	May	Jun	Jul	Aug	Sep	Oct	Nov	Dec	Year
Record high °C (°F)	16.4 (61.5)	19.8 (67.6)	23.2 (73.8)	28.6 (83.5)	31.7 (89.1)	33.0 (91.4)	36.0 (96.8)	35.6 (96.1)	34.4 (93.9)	30.1 (86.2)	24.1 (75.4)	23.5 (74.3)	36.0 (96.8)
Mean daily maximum °C (°F)	6.7 (44.1)	7.5 (45.5)	11.6 (52.9)	17.5 (63.5)	22.2 (72.0)	25.2 (77.4)	29.3 (84.7)	30.4 (86.7)	26.3 (79.3)	20.7 (69.3)	15.1 (59.2)	9.5 (49.1)	18.5 (65.3)
Daily mean °C (°F)	1.6 (34.9)	2.0 (35.6)	5.3 (41.5)	10.6 (51.1)	15.8 (60.4)	19.9 (67.8)	23.9 (75.0)	24.6 (76.3)	20.8 (69.4)	14.6 (58.3)	8.5 (47.3)	3.6 (38.5)	12.6 (54.7)
Mean daily minimum °C (°F)	−3.1 (26.4)	−3.1 (26.4)	−0.8 (30.6)	3.6 (38.5)	9.4 (48.9)	15.1 (59.2)	19.6 (67.3)	20.1 (68.2)	16.2 (61.2)	9.3 (48.7)	2.8 (37.0)	−1.4 (29.5)	7.3 (45.2)
Record low °C (°F)	−14.1 (6.6)	−12.8 (9.0)	−8.3 (17.1)	−5.7 (21.7)	−1.3 (29.7)	3.0 (37.4)	10.8 (51.4)	10.6 (51.1)	4.7 (40.5)	−2.2 (28.0)	−6.8 (19.8)	−9.6 (14.7)	−14.1 (6.6)
Average precipitation mm (inches)	60.2 (2.37)	68.9 (2.71)	114.9 (4.52)	114.3 (4.50)	143.1 (5.63)	204.8 (8.06)	202.2 (7.96)	159.6 (6.28)	186.7 (7.35)	154.7 (6.09)	76.0 (2.99)	60.5 (2.38)	1,534.6 (60.42)
Average precipitation days (≥ 1.0 mm)	9.0	9.8	11.9	10.8	10.5	12.6	12.8	9.7	11.2	10.0	8.0	8.4	124.7
Mean monthly sunshine hours	119.3	116.8	149.7	177.5	181.9	126.4	143.2	191.1	146.0	150.4	137.6	129.5	1,777.8
Source: JMA
