= Kōka, Shiga =

Kōka 甲賀市
- City
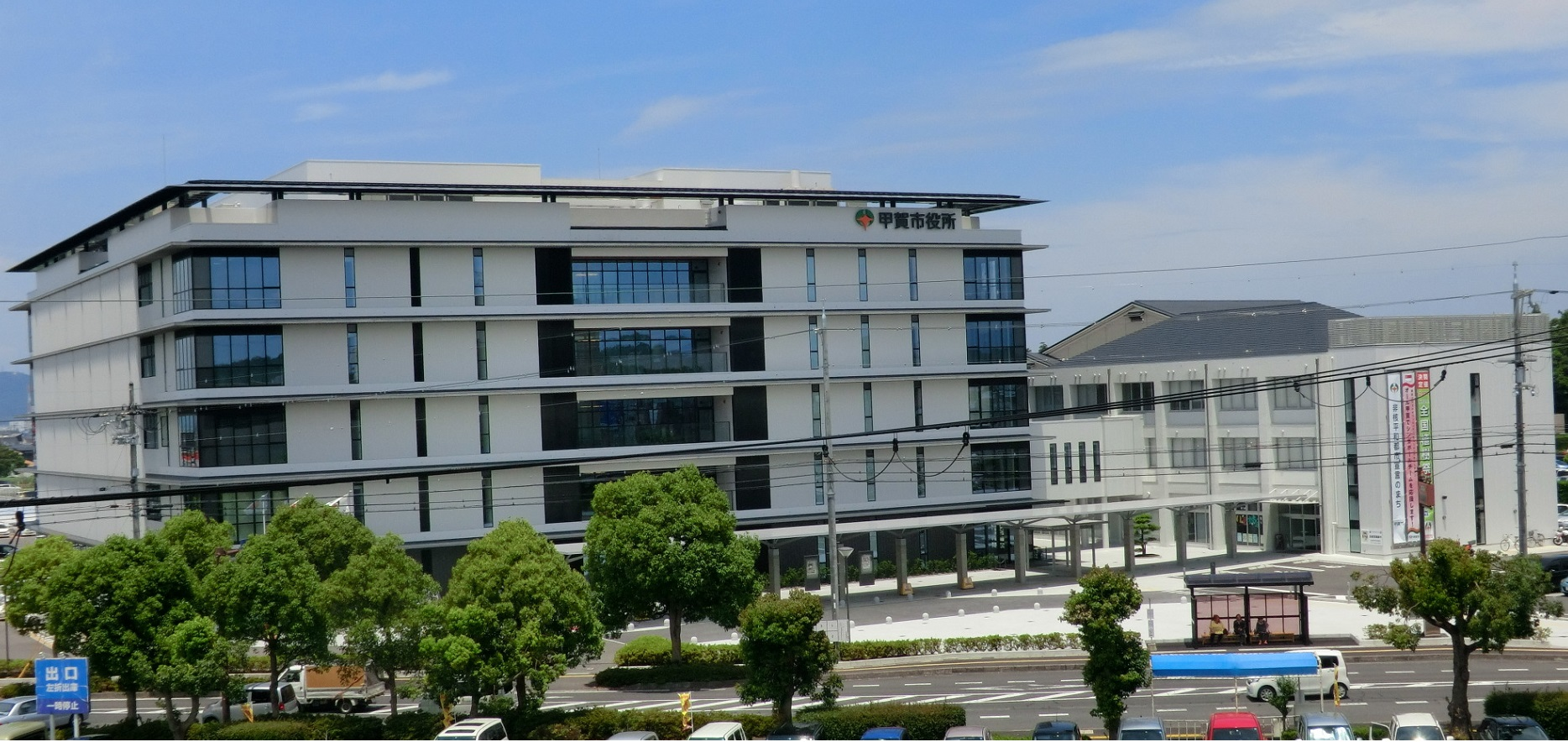
- Kōka City Hall

- Flag Emblem

- Location of Kōka in Shiga Prefecture

- Location in Japan
- Coordinates: 34°58′N 136°10′E
- Country: Japan
- Region: Kansai
- Prefecture: Shiga

Government
  - Mayor: Hiroki Iwanaga

Area
  - Total: 481.62 km^{2} (185.95 sq mi)

Population (September 30, 2021)
  - Total: 89,619
  - Density: 186.08/km^{2} (481.94/sq mi)
- Time zone: UTC+09:00 (JST)
- City hall address: 6053, Minakuchi, Minakuchichō, Kōka-shi, Shiga-ken; 528-8502
- Website: Official website
- Symbols
- Bird: Common kingfisher
- Flower: Sasayuri (Lilium japonicum)
- Tree: Cryptomeria

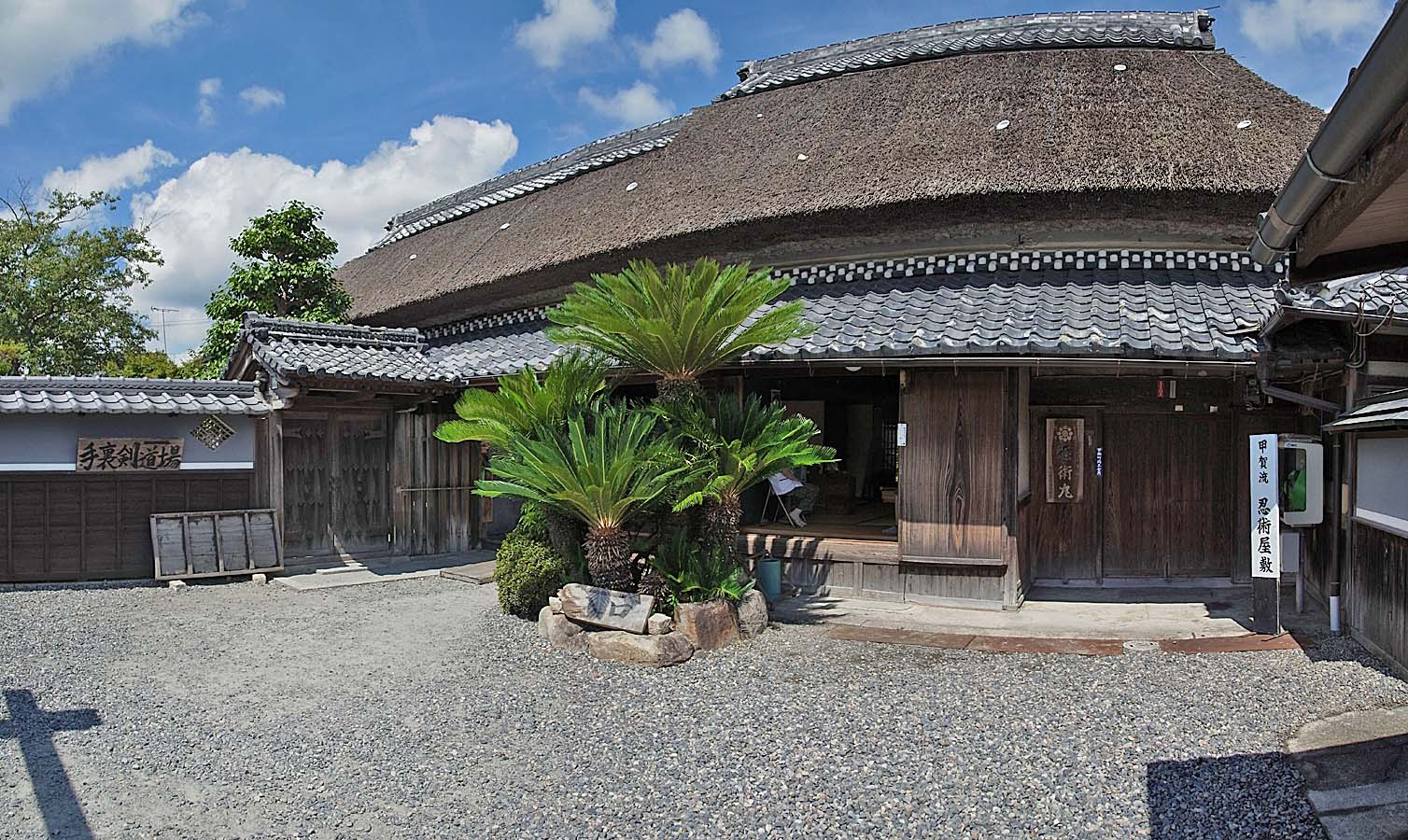
Kōka "ninja house"

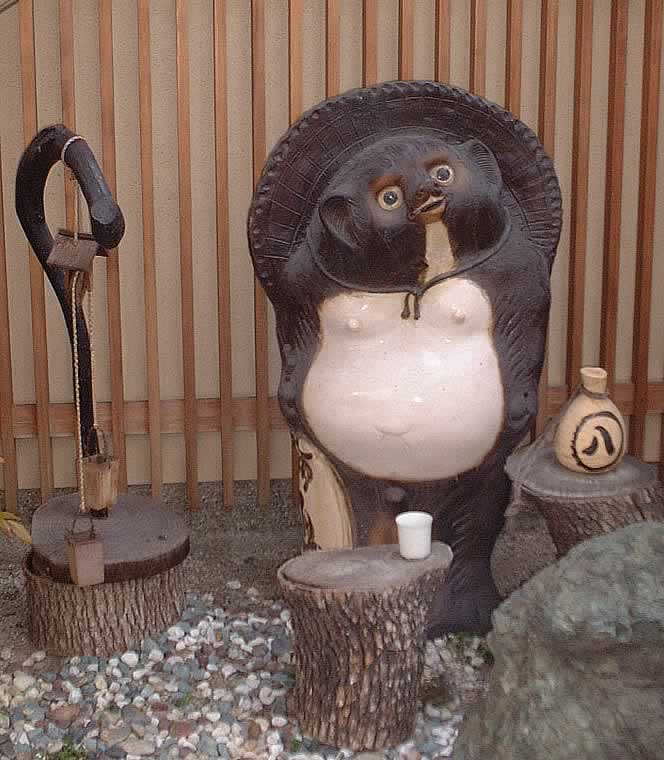
Shigaraki ware ceramics

Kōka (甲賀市, Kōka-shi) is a city in southern Shiga Prefecture, Japan. As of 30 September 2021, the city had an estimated population of 89,619 in 36708 households and a population density of 190 persons per km^{2}. The total area of the city is 481.62 square kilometres (185.95 sq mi).

== Geography ==
Kōka occupies the entire southern end of Shiga Prefecture, and is thus long east-to-west. At the eastern end of Kōka, the southern ridge of the Suzuka Mountains with one elevation of 1000 meters runs from northeast to southwest, forming the boundary with Mie Prefecture. The highest altitude point in Kōka is Mount Amagoi in this range.

=== Neighboring municipalities ===
Kyoto Prefecture

- Minamiyamashiro
- Ujitawara
- Wazuka

Mie Prefecture

- Iga
- Kameyama
- Komono
- Suzuka
- Yokkaichi

Shiga Prefecture

- Higashiōmi
- Hino
- Konan
- Ōtsu
- Rittō
- Ryūō

=== Climate ===
Kōka has a humid subtropical climate (Köppen Cfa) characterized by warm summers and cool winters with light to no snowfall. The average annual temperature in Kōka is 13.6 °C. The average annual rainfall is 1673 mm with September as the wettest month. The temperatures are highest on average in August, at around 25.4 °C, and lowest in January, at around 2.1 °C.

Climate data for Shigaraki（elevation 265 m）
Month	Jan	Feb	Mar	Apr	May	Jun	Jul	Aug	Sep	Oct	Nov	Dec	Year
Mean daily maximum °C (°F)	6.5 (43.7)	7.1 (44.8)	11.0 (51.8)	17.3 (63.1)	21.8 (71.2)	25.0 (77.0)	28.8 (83.8)	30.0 (86.0)	26.0 (78.8)	20.3 (68.5)	14.9 (58.8)	9.5 (49.1)	18.2 (64.7)
Mean daily minimum °C (°F)	−3.5 (25.7)	−3.4 (25.9)	−1.1 (30.0)	3.4 (38.1)	9.1 (48.4)	14.6 (58.3)	19.1 (66.4)	19.6 (67.3)	15.9 (60.6)	8.5 (47.3)	2.4 (36.3)	−1.9 (28.6)	6.9 (44.4)
Average precipitation mm (inches)	55.2 (2.17)	70.7 (2.78)	121.3 (4.78)	111.5 (4.39)	152.4 (6.00)	207.6 (8.17)	204.4 (8.05)	143.7 (5.66)	168.4 (6.63)	120.1 (4.73)	75.2 (2.96)	53.6 (2.11)	1,484.1 (58.43)
Average precipitation days (≥ 1.0 mm)	9.1	10.1	13.1	10.9	11.2	13.0	12.8	9.3	11.4	9.8	8.3	8.2	127.2
Mean monthly sunshine hours	101.2	100.9	133.6	166.3	164.5	127.6	136.5	173.8	135.4	136.6	122.1	115.9	1,614.4
Source: Japan Meteorological Agency

Climate data for Tsuchiyama (elevation 248 m）
Month	Jan	Feb	Mar	Apr	May	Jun	Jul	Aug	Sep	Oct	Nov	Dec	Year
Mean daily maximum °C (°F)	6.3 (43.3)	6.8 (44.2)	10.7 (51.3)	16.9 (62.4)	21.2 (70.2)	24.6 (76.3)	28.5 (83.3)	29.8 (85.6)	25.9 (78.6)	20.3 (68.5)	14.8 (58.6)	9.3 (48.7)	17.9 (64.3)
Mean daily minimum °C (°F)	−1.9 (28.6)	−1.8 (28.8)	0.6 (33.1)	5.6 (42.1)	10.9 (51.6)	15.9 (60.6)	20.3 (68.5)	21.3 (70.3)	17.5 (63.5)	10.6 (51.1)	4.5 (40.1)	−0.1 (31.8)	8.6 (47.5)
Average precipitation mm (inches)	60.0 (2.36)	74.4 (2.93)	113.8 (4.48)	114.9 (4.52)	159.0 (6.26)	205.4 (8.09)	212.1 (8.35)	193.5 (7.62)	208.8 (8.22)	124.4 (4.90)	80.6 (3.17)	56.7 (2.23)	1,603.6 (63.13)
Average precipitation days (≥ 1.0 mm)	10.6	10.9	12.6	11.0	11.6	13.6	13.7	10.4	11.8	10.0	8.4	9.4	134
Mean monthly sunshine hours	90.9	98.2	137.0	167.1	165.8	128.3	139.4	177.2	132.7	140.2	125.0	108.9	1,610.7
Source: Japan Meteorological Agency

== Demographics ==
Per Japanese census data, the population of Kōka has recently plateaued after several decades of growth.

Historical population
Year	Pop.	±%
1920	59,455	—
1930	60,876	+2.4%
1940	61,133	+0.4%
1950	75,407	+23.3%
1960	70,755	−6.2%
1970	67,762	−4.2%
1980	75,203	+11.0%
1990	82,668	+9.9%
2000	92,482	+11.9%
2010	92,704	+0.2%
2020	88,358	−4.7%

== History ==
Kōka is part of ancient Ōmi Province. During the Sengoku period, the area was an ikki and effectively self-governed by local ninja families. In the Edo period it became a center for the Kōga-ryū school of ninjutsu, in rivalry with Iga-ryū. The area was on the route of the Tōkaidō highway connecting Kyoto with Edo and the eastern provinces of Japan. Minakuchi-juku was both a post station and also a castle town for Minakuchi Domain, which ruled over parts of the area of Kōka during the Edo period. The village of Minakuchi was established on April 1, 1889, within Kōka District, Shiga with the creation of the modern municipalities system. It was raised to town status on August 18, 1894. On October 1, 2004, Minakuchi merged with the towns of Kōka, Kōnan, Shigaraki and Tsuchiyama (all from Kōka District) to form the city of Kōka.

== Government ==
Kōka has a mayor-council form of government with a directly elected mayor and a unicameral city council of 24 members. Kōka contributes three members to the Shiga Prefectural Assembly. In terms of national politics, the city is part of Shiga 3rd district of the lower house of the Diet of Japan.

== Economy ==
Kōka is traditionally known for its production of ceramics, most notably Shigaraki ware, as well as agriculture and forestry. Light manufacturing is concentrated to pharmaceuticals.

== Education ==
Kōka has 21 public elementary schools and six public middle schools operated by the city government and one middle school operated by the Shiga Prefectural Department of Education. The prefecture also operates four public high schools.

== Transport ==
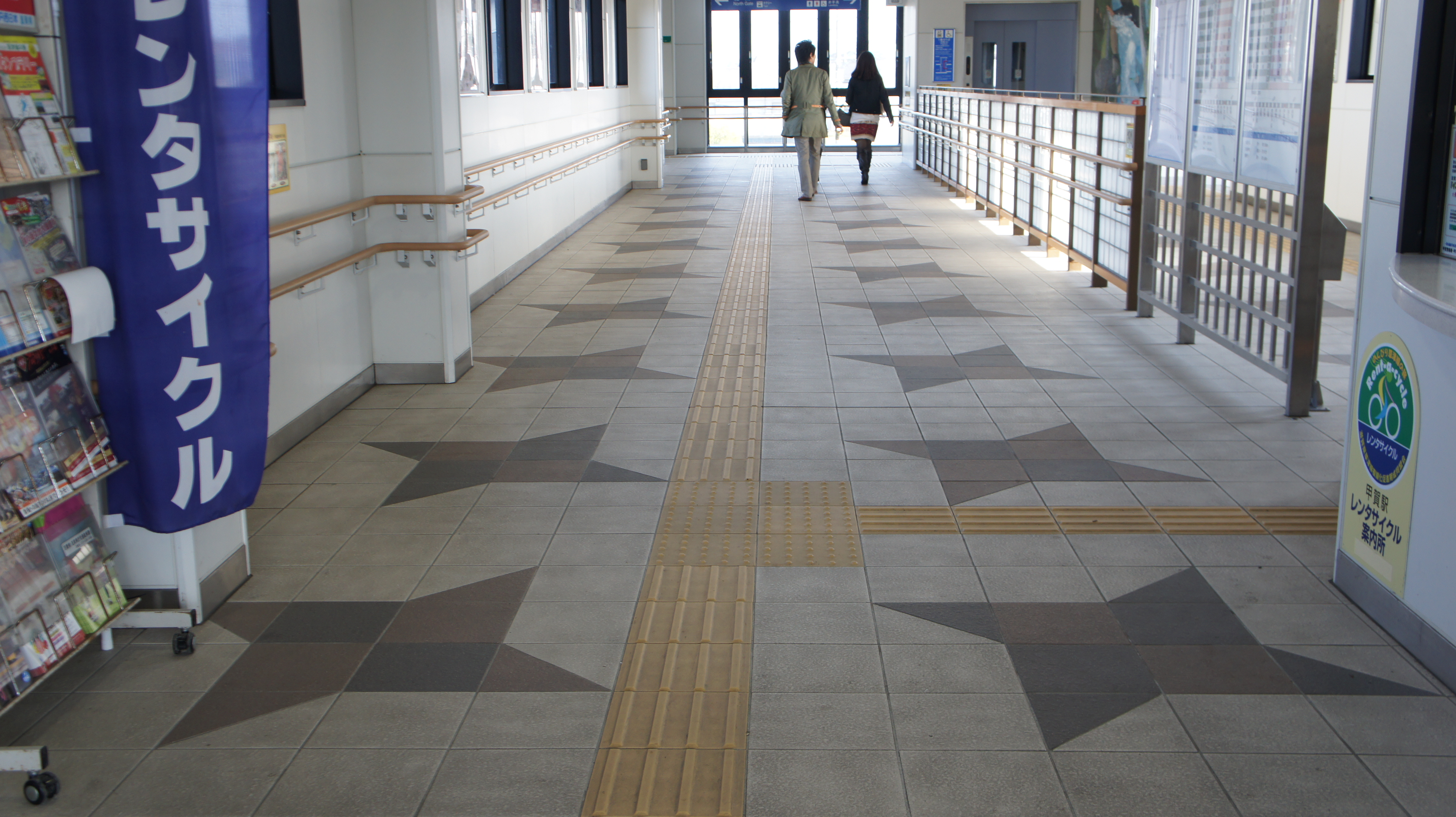
Shuriken theme at one of the train stations in Kōka, 2011

=== Railway ===
JR West – Kusatsu Line

- Kibukawa - Kōnan - Terashō - Kōka - Aburahi

Ohmi Railway – Main Line

- Minakuchi Matsuo - Minakuchi - Minakuchi Ishibashi - Minakuchi Jōnan - Kibukawa

Shigaraki Kōgen Railway - Shigaraki Line

- Kibukawa - Shigarakigūshi - Kumoi - Chokushi - Gyokukeijimae - Shigaraki

=== Highway ===
- Shin-Meishin Expressway
- National Route 1
- National Route 307
- National Route 422
- National Route 477

== Sister cities ==
- DeWitt, Michigan, United States, renewed 2005
- Marshall, Michigan, United States, renewed 2005
- Traverse City, Michigan, United States, since 1969; renewed 2005

== Local attractions ==
- Miho Museum
- Minakuchi Castle
- Minakuchi-juku
- Minakuchi Okayama Castle ruins
- site of Shigaraki Palace, National Historic Site
- Tarumi Saiō Tongū Site, National Historic Site
- Tsuchiyama-juku

== Noted people ==
- Kaoruko Himeno, author
- Mineichi Iwanaga, politician
- Peanuts-kun, Musician
