= Tsuchiyama, Shiga =

Town in Kōka, Shiga, Japan

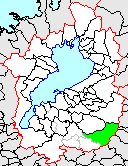
Location of Tsuchiyama

Tsuchiyama (土山町, Tsuchiyama-chō) was a town located in Kōka District, Shiga Prefecture, Japan.

As of 2004, the town had an estimated population of 9,007 and a density of 71.37 persons per km^{2}. The total area is 126.2 km^{2}.

On October 1, 2004, Tsuchiyama and the towns of Kōka, Kōnan, Minakuchi and Shigaraki (all from Kōka District), were merged to create the city of Kōka.

Tsuchiyama is famous for Tsuchiyama-juku, one of the 53 post stations along the Tokaido road and for its production of green tea. Kōka city produces 80% of all green tea in Shiga Prefecture.

The sister city of Tsuchiyama is Traverse City, Michigan, United States.

== Climate ==
Climate data for Tsuchiyama (1991−2020 normals, extremes 1978−present)
| Month | Jan | Feb | Mar | Apr | May | Jun | Jul | Aug | Sep | Oct | Nov | Dec | Year |
|---|---|---|---|---|---|---|---|---|---|---|---|---|---|
| Record high °C (°F) | 17.1 (62.8) | 20.0 (68.0) | 23.8 (74.8) | 29.1 (84.4) | 32.8 (91.0) | 33.9 (93.0) | 37.2 (99.0) | 37.0 (98.6) | 34.9 (94.8) | 30.7 (87.3) | 24.8 (76.6) | 20.7 (69.3) | 37.2 (99.0) |
| Mean daily maximum °C (°F) | 6.6 (43.9) | 7.5 (45.5) | 11.5 (52.7) | 17.2 (63.0) | 21.9 (71.4) | 25.1 (77.2) | 29.2 (84.6) | 30.5 (86.9) | 26.4 (79.5) | 20.8 (69.4) | 15.2 (59.4) | 9.4 (48.9) | 18.4 (65.2) |
| Daily mean °C (°F) | 2.2 (36.0) | 2.7 (36.9) | 6.0 (42.8) | 11.4 (52.5) | 16.4 (61.5) | 20.4 (68.7) | 24.5 (76.1) | 25.5 (77.9) | 21.7 (71.1) | 15.8 (60.4) | 9.8 (49.6) | 4.6 (40.3) | 13.4 (56.2) |
| Mean daily minimum °C (°F) | −1.6 (29.1) | −1.5 (29.3) | 1.0 (33.8) | 5.8 (42.4) | 11.4 (52.5) | 16.4 (61.5) | 21.0 (69.8) | 21.8 (71.2) | 17.9 (64.2) | 11.3 (52.3) | 4.9 (40.8) | 0.4 (32.7) | 9.1 (48.3) |
| Record low °C (°F) | −10.4 (13.3) | −9.7 (14.5) | −6.3 (20.7) | −3.1 (26.4) | 0.9 (33.6) | 4.9 (40.8) | 13.1 (55.6) | 12.4 (54.3) | 6.3 (43.3) | 0.1 (32.2) | −3.1 (26.4) | −9.2 (15.4) | −10.4 (13.3) |
| Average precipitation mm (inches) | 65.6 (2.58) | 74.7 (2.94) | 109.1 (4.30) | 112.5 (4.43) | 150.1 (5.91) | 197.0 (7.76) | 207.3 (8.16) | 181.8 (7.16) | 233.2 (9.18) | 156.8 (6.17) | 73.9 (2.91) | 62.6 (2.46) | 1,640.3 (64.58) |
| Average precipitation days (≥ 1.0 mm) | 10.7 | 10.7 | 11.8 | 11.0 | 10.8 | 12.8 | 13.2 | 10.6 | 11.7 | 10.2 | 7.9 | 9.7 | 131.1 |
| Mean monthly sunshine hours | 96.1 | 106.1 | 147.8 | 174.9 | 183.4 | 133.2 | 149.8 | 186.3 | 138.0 | 145.5 | 129.2 | 109.1 | 1,710 |
Source: JMA
