= Kōka District, Shiga =

Former district in Shiga prefecture, Japan

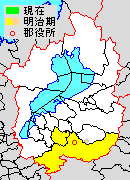
Map of Koka District with Meiji period (1890) area in yellow.

Kōka (甲賀郡, Kōka-gun) was a district located in Shiga Prefecture, Japan.

As of 2003, the district had an estimated population of 147,928 and a density of 267.90 persons per km^{2}. The total area was 552.18 km^{2}.

From circa 1460 until 1574, during the Sengoku period, the district was effectively independent of centralized state control and operated as the Kōka-gun Chūsō, a military confederacy of jizamurai and other warrior families that became known as ninja. During this period it formed an alliance with its southern neighbor, the Iga Sokoku Ikki, a similar independent confederacy of ninja families. Both alliance and the ikki ended when Oda Nobunaga defeated Kōka and compelled it to be a vassal.

== Towns and villages ==
Before the dissolution in 2004, the district had seven towns as listed below. Each municipality is now a part of the city noted in the parentheses.

- Ishibe (Konan)
- Kōsei (Konan)
- Kōka (Kōka)
- Kōnan (Kōka)
- Minakuchi (Kōka)
- Shigaraki (Kōka)
- Tsuchiyama (Kōka)

== Mergers ==
- On October 1, 2004:
  - the towns of Kōsei and Ishibe were merged to create the city of Konan.
  - the former town of Kōka absorbed the towns of Kōnan, Minakuchi, Shigaraki and Tsuchiyama to create the city of Kōka. Kōka District was dissolved as a result of this merger.
