= Kōsatsu =

Japanese public proclamation, to 1873

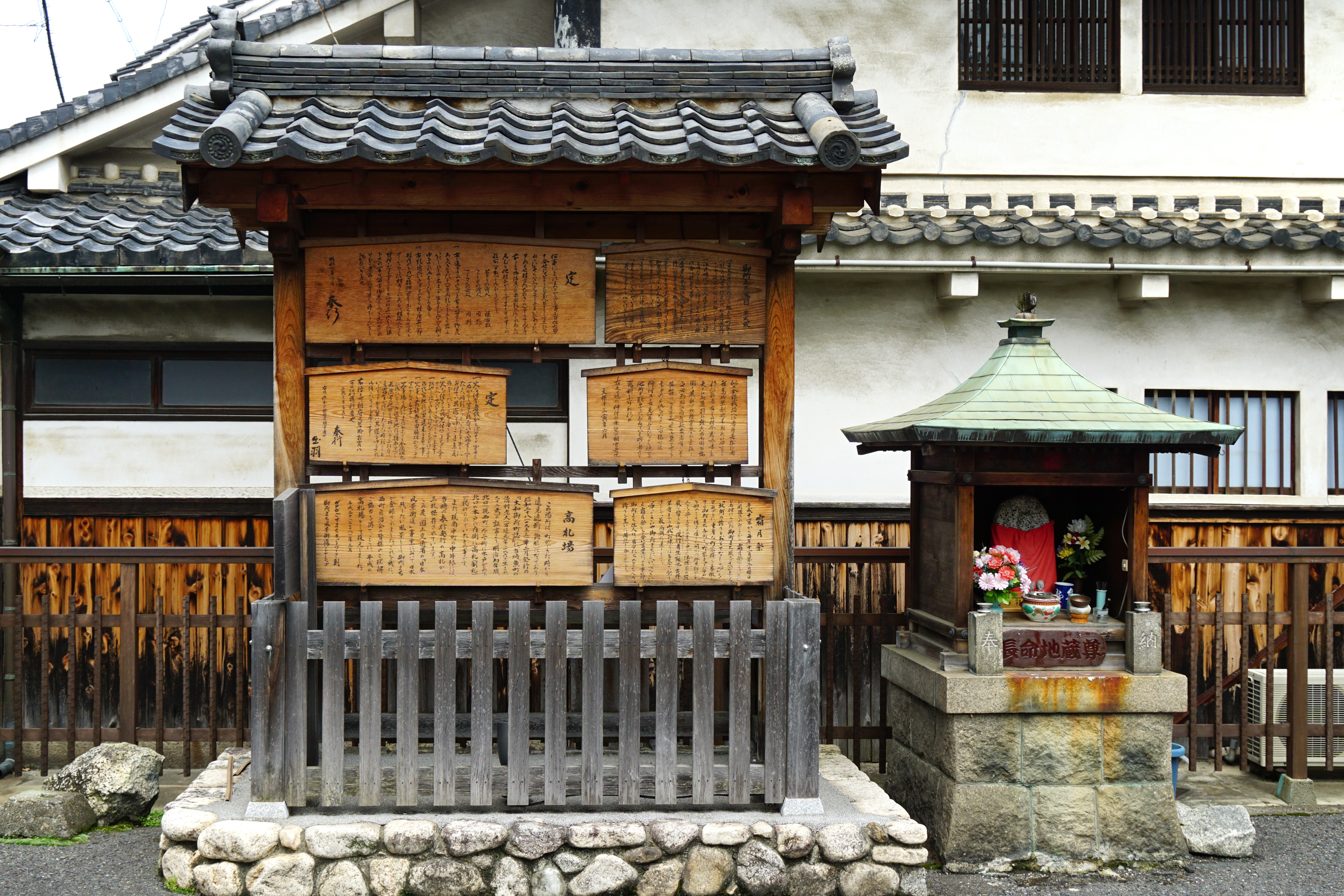
Several kōsatsu were placed at the kōsatsu-ba in Gose-chō (御所町), Nara Prefecture, Japan

From the late Nara Period of Japan until the early Meiji period, the kōsatsu (Japanese: 高札, literally "High plaque"), also called Seisatsu (Japanese: 制札, literally "Controlling plaque"), were used as a public notice of the proclamations of the relevant han-lord or shogun. They were local or nationwide laws written on a wooden plate, which was placed on a structure known as a kōsatsu-ba adjacent to the area's shukuba or sekisho (関所). Being on the borders between han, these waystations were frequently trafficked.

One of the kosatsu in the Edo Period was on prohibiting Christianity.

As literacy rates improved and modern Japan emerged, the kōsatsu became less necessary. They were abolished in 1873, replaced by the Kanpō (Japanese government gazette) and other means of public notice.

== See also ==
- Public notice
- Kanpō
- Bulletin board
- Wall newspaper
