= Shigaraki train disaster =

1991 railway accident in Japan

Coordinates: 34°55′14″N 136°05′16″E

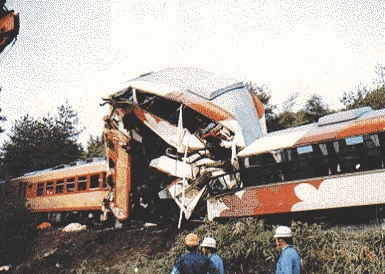
- SKR train (right) crumpled up against the JR West train.

Details
- Date: May 14, 1991; 35 years ago 10:35
- Location: Shigaraki, Shiga
- Country: Japan
- Line: SKR Shigaraki Line
- Operator: JR West, SKR
- Incident type: Collision
- Cause: Signal passed at danger

Statistics
- Trains: 2
- Deaths: 42
- Injured: 614

The Shigaraki train disaster (信楽高原鐵道衝突事故, Shigaraki Kōgen Tetsudō shōtotsu jiko) was a railway accident that occurred in Shigaraki (now Koka), Shiga Prefecture, Japan on May 14, 1991. A Shigaraki Kōgen Railway (SKR) train and a West Japan Railway Company (JR West) train collided head-on, killing 42 people and injuring 614 others. Until the Amagasaki derailment in 2005, it was the deadliest railway disaster in Japan since the Tsurumi rail accident of 1963, which killed 161 people.

== Background ==
The Shigaraki Kōgen Railway is a 14.7-kilometer single-track line that runs south from Kibukawa to Shigaraki. The unprofitable line was split from JR West shortly after the privatisation of the Japanese National Railways in 1987 and transferred to a third-sector railway company owned and subsided by local governments.

With the holding of the World Ceramic Festival in Shigaraki, planned to run from April 20th to May 26th 1991, plans were made to increase the capacity of the single-track line to accommodate more trains, including direct trains from Osaka and Kyoto, to handle the expected heavy crowds during the festival. A passing loop, Onotani Signal Station (小野谷信号場, Onotani Shingōjō), was added to the line and the signalling system upgraded.

JR West was concerned about the potential for through trains waiting at Kibukawa for northbound trains to arrive to hold up other trains. They requested the installation of a direction priority lever controlled by JR West signallers that would set signal 12L, controlling departure of northbound trains from Onotani, to red, and set signal 13R, controlling departure of southbound trains from Onotani, to green if the line was clear. Despite failing to reach an agreement with the SKR on the precise nature of the lever and who should operate it, JR West went ahead and independently installed the lever (labelled 65R) without informing the SKR or the Ministry of Transport.

== Accident ==
At 10:18 (1:18 UTC) local time on May 14, 1991, a three-car special JR West rapid service train (501D) from Kyoto bound for Shigaraki entered the Shigaraki Line at Kibukawa from the Kusatsu Line, transporting 714 passengers to the World Ceramic Festival that was being held in Shigaraki at the time.

In the opposite direction, a four-car SKR local train (534D) with fifteen people on board, including passengers and crew, was scheduled to depart Shigaraki towards Kibukawa at 10:15. The stationmaster attempted to clear signal 22L, which controlled departure from Shigaraki station, from red to green, but was unable to. This was because the direction priority lever had been operated, and signal 22L was interlocked with signal 13R to prevent two trains being signalled into the same section at once. A signal technician sent by the manufacturer was also unable to clear the signal, as they were unaware of the existence of the direction priority lever. The operations manager instructed the stationmaster to give the departure signal to the train via flag anyway, which was done at 10:24. The staff at Shigaraki should have informed all involved personnel about the change in operations and sent a staff member to Onotani to ensure the line between Shigaraki and Onotani was clear, but failed to do so due to lack of staff.

Onotani Signal Station was the only point on the single-track line where two trains could safely pass, but the JR West train passed through Onotani at 10:31, as it was given a green signal despite the approaching SKR train. A safety device installed in case trains passed a signal at danger should have detected the departure of the SKR train and set the southbound signals at Onotani to red, but it failed to operate.

The two trains collided at 10:35 between Onotani Signal Station and Shigarakigūshi station. The SKR driver was killed in the crash, but the JR West driver survived.

== Aftermath ==
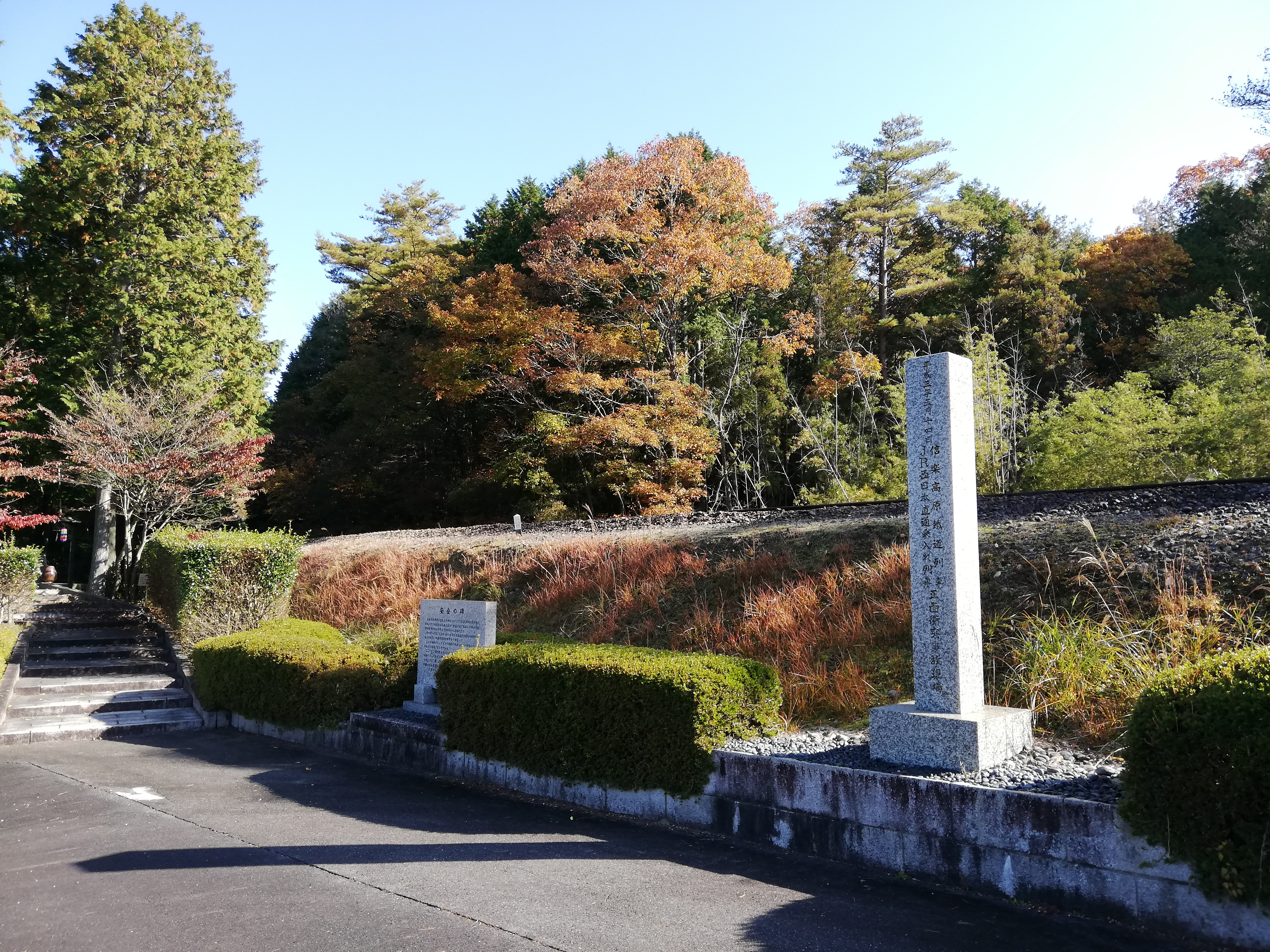
Memorial at the crash site

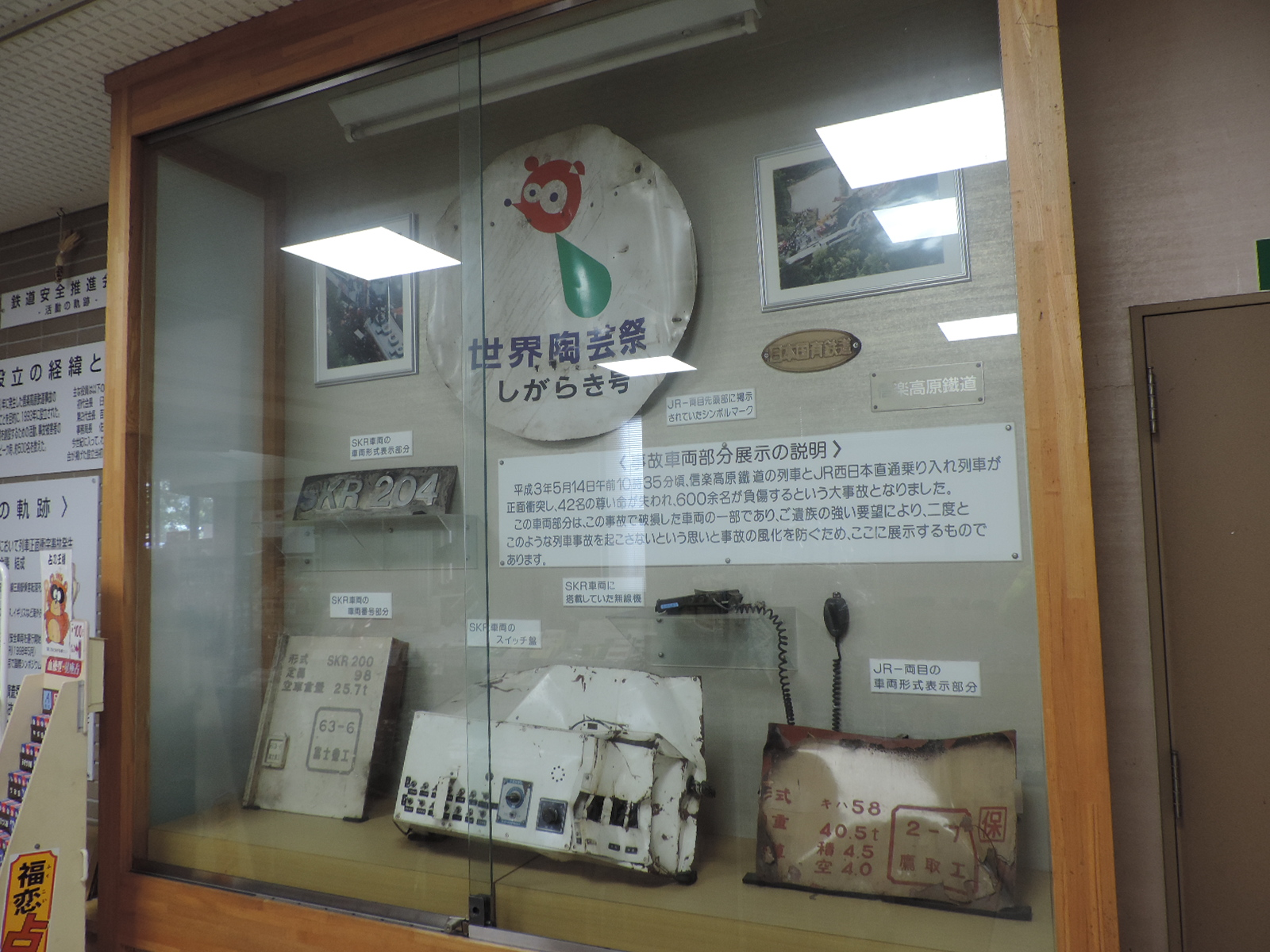
Display of artefacts from the crash at Shigaraki station

SKR suspended passenger service while the Shiga Prefecture and Ministry of Transport conducted investigations, and service did not reopen until December 1991. When service resumed, the use of Onotani Signal Station as a passing point was discontinued. As a result, service frequency was reduced from twice an hour to once an hour, with operation in only one direction at any time.

The two companies were sued for negligence in the Ōtsu District Court in 1993, which found them both guilty in 1999. JR West appealed to the Osaka High Court, but their appeal was rejected in 2002. The cost of the compensation the SKR was required to pay led to Shiga Prefecture and Koka City taking ownership of the line's infrastructure to prevent the railway's bankruptcy.

JR West discontinued through train operations to the Shigaraki Line, while other Japan Railways Group companies similarly discontinued non-regular through train operations to private and third-sector railway lines.

The World Ceramic Festival, which was to continue until May 26, was cancelled the day following the accident.

== See also ==
- Lists of rail accidents
