= Chokushi Station =

Railway station in Kōka, Shiga Prefecture, Japan

Chokushi Station 勅旨駅
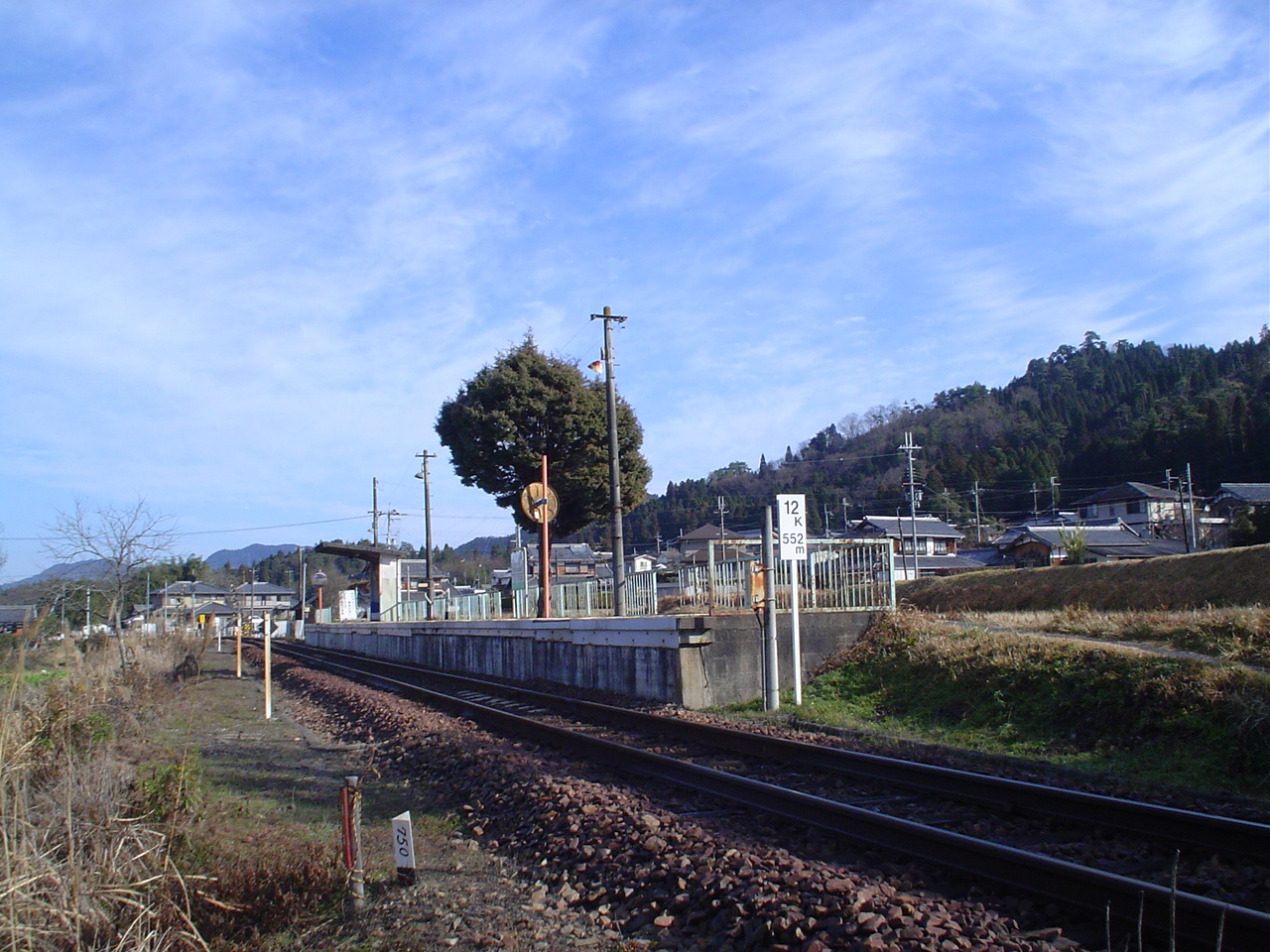
- Chokushi Station, December 2008

General information
- Location: Shigarakicho Chokushi, Kōka-shi, Shiga-ken 529-1804; Japan
- Coordinates: 34.8939°N 136.0733°E
- Operator: Shigaraki Kohgen Railway
- Line: Shigaraki Line
- Distance: 12.4 km from Kibukawa
- Platforms: 1 side platform

Construction
- Structure type: At-grade

Other information
- Status: Unstaffed

History
- Opened: 1 June 1963

Passengers
- 152 per day (2017)
Location
- Location within Shiga Prefecture Location within Japan

Chokushi Station (勅旨駅, Chokushi eki) is a passenger railway station located in the city of Kōka, Shiga, Japan operated by the third-sector Shigaraki Kohgen Railway.

== Lines ==
Chokushi Station is a station on the Shigaraki Line, and is 12.4 kilometers from the starting point of the line at Kibukawa.

== Station layout ==
The station consists of one side platform serving single bi-directional track. There is no station building, and the station is unattended.

== Adjacent stations ==
«	Service	»
Shigaraki Line
Kumoi	Local	Gyokukeijimae

== History ==
Chokushi Station opened on June 1, 1963.

== Passenger statistics ==
Ridership per day
Year	Ridership
2011	198
2012	200
2013	176
2014	160
2015	172
2016	214
2017	152

== Surrounding area ==
- Yawata Jinja
- Tenjin Jinja
- Japan National Route 307

== See also ==
- List of railway stations in Japan
