= Gyokukeijimae Station =

Railway station in Kōka, Shiga Prefecture, Japan

Gyokukeijimae Station 玉桂寺前駅
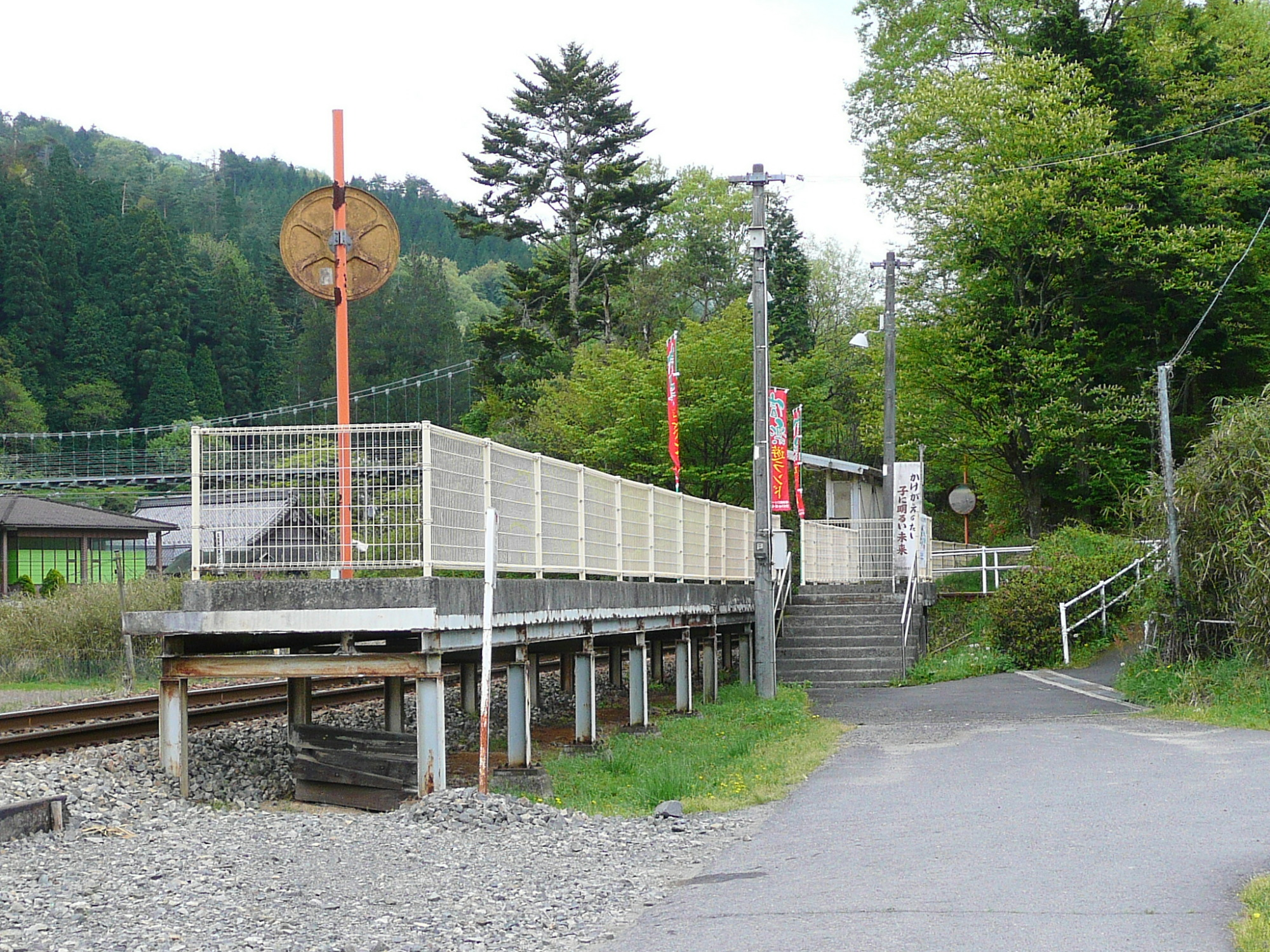
- Gyokukeijimae Station, May 2008

General information
- Location: Shigarakicho Chokushi, Kōka-shi, Shiga-ken 529-1804; Japan
- Coordinates: 34.8857°N 136.0695°E
- Operator: Shigaraki Kohgen Railway
- Line: Shigaraki Line
- Distance: 13.4 km from Kibukawa
- Platforms: 1 side platform

Construction
- Structure type: At-grade

Other information
- Status: Unstaffed

History
- Opened: 13 July 1987

Passengers
- 13 per day (2017)
Location
- Location within Shiga Prefecture Location within Japan

Gyokukeijimae Station (玉桂寺前駅, Gyokukeijimae eki) is a passenger railway station located in the city of Kōka, Shiga, Japan operated by the third-sector Shigaraki Kohgen Railway.

== Lines ==
Gyokukeijimae Station is a station on the Shigaraki Line, and is 13.4 kilometers from the starting point of the line at Kibukawa.

== Station layout ==
The station consists of one side platform serving single bi-directional track. There is no station building, and the station is unattended.

== Adjacent stations ==
«	Service	»
Shigaraki Line
Chokushi	Local	Shigaraki

== History ==
Gyokukeijimae Station opened on July 13, 1987.

== Passenger statistics ==
With a ridership of 13 passengers a day, Gyokukeijimae Station has the lowest ridership on the Shigaraki Line.

Ridership per day
Year	Ridership
2011	20
2012	20
2013	14
2014	13
2015	14
2016	2
2017	13

== Surrounding area ==
- Gyokukei-ji
- Koka City Shigaraki Library
- Shigaraki Gymnasium

== See also ==
- List of railway stations in Japan
