= Kumoi Station =

Railway station in Kōka, Shiga Prefecture, Japan

Kumoi Station 雲井駅
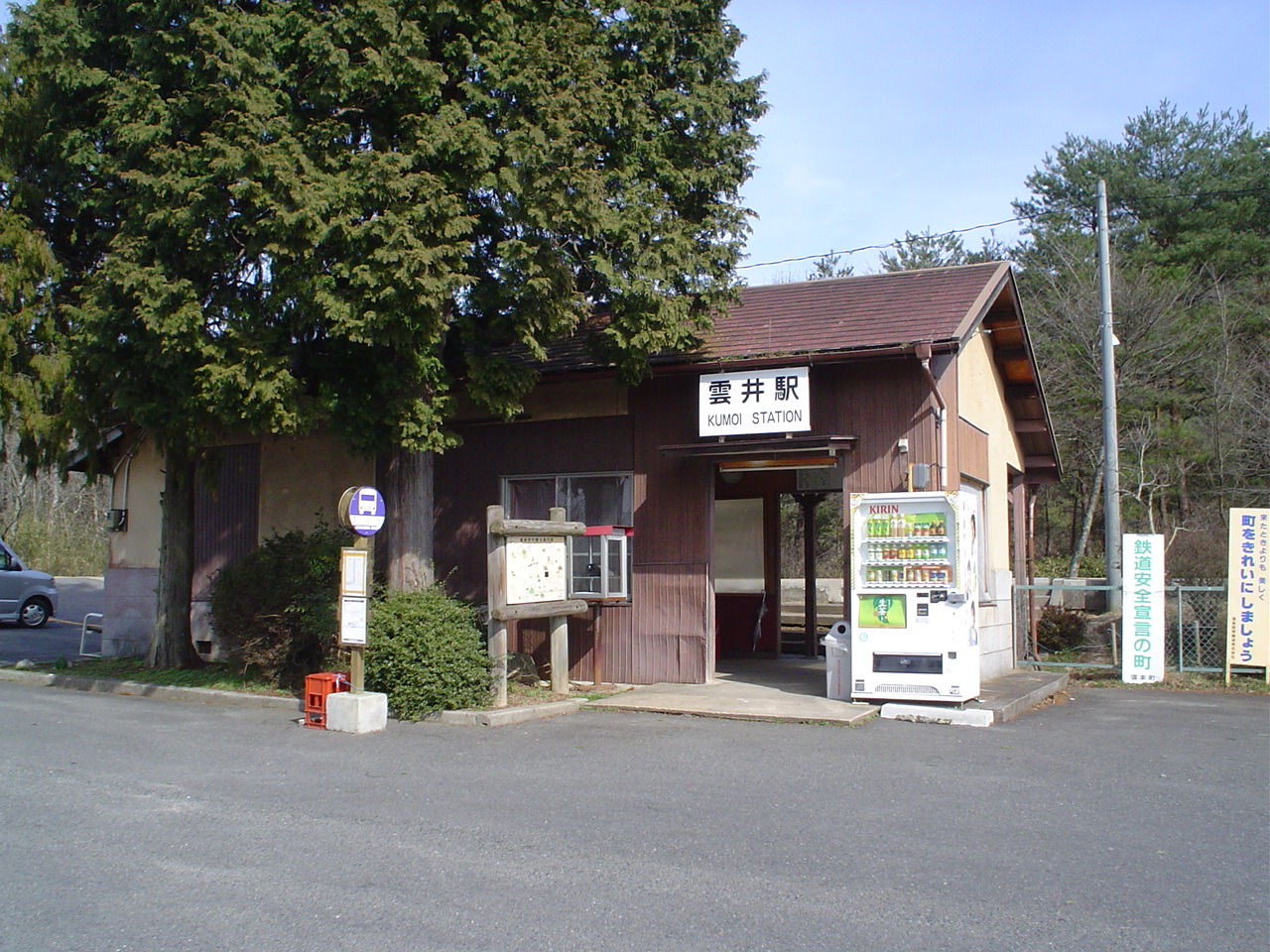
- Station entrance

General information
- Location: Shigarakichomaki, Kōka-shi, Shiga-ken 529-1803; Japan
- Coordinates: 34.9112°N 136.0843°E
- Operator: Shigaraki Kohgen Railway
- Line: Shigaraki Line
- Distance: 10.2 km from Kibukawa
- Platforms: 1 side platform

Construction
- Structure type: At-grade

Other information
- Status: Unstaffed

History
- Opened: 8 May 1933

Passengers
- 294 per day (2017)
Location
- Location within Shiga Prefecture Location within Japan

Kumoi Station (雲井駅, Kumoi eki) is a passenger railway station located in the city of Kōka, Shiga, Japan operated by the third-sector Shigaraki Kohgen Railway.

== Lines ==
Kumoi Station is a station on the Shigaraki Line, and is 10.2 kilometers from the starting point of the line at Kibukawa.

== Station layout ==
The station consists of one side platform serving single bi-directional track. The station's building dates from the Shigaraki Line's opening in 1933, making it the oldest structure on the line. The station is unattended.

== Adjacent stations ==
«	Service	»
Shigaraki Line
Shigarakigūshi	Local	Chokushi

== History ==
Kumoi Station opened on May 8, 1933 as a station of the Japanese Government Railway (JGR). The station was closed from October 1, 1943 to July 25, 1947, when it reopened as a station of the Japan National Railway (JNR). The station became part of the West Japan Railway Company on April 1, 1987 due to the privatization and dissolution of the JNR and was transferred to the Shigaraki Kohgen Railway on July 13, 1987.

== Passenger statistics ==
Ridership per day
Year	Ridership
2011	370
2012	373
2013	339
2014	309
2015	332
2016	360
2017	294

== Surrounding area ==
- Kumoi Elementary School
- Japan National Route 307

== See also ==
- List of railway stations in Japan
