= 雲井駅 =

雲井駅 or 雲井驛 may refer to:

- Kumoi Station
- Unjeong Station
