= Shigaraki Kohgen Railway =

Railway line in Shiga Prefecture, Japan

Shigaraki Kohgen Railway Co., Ltd.
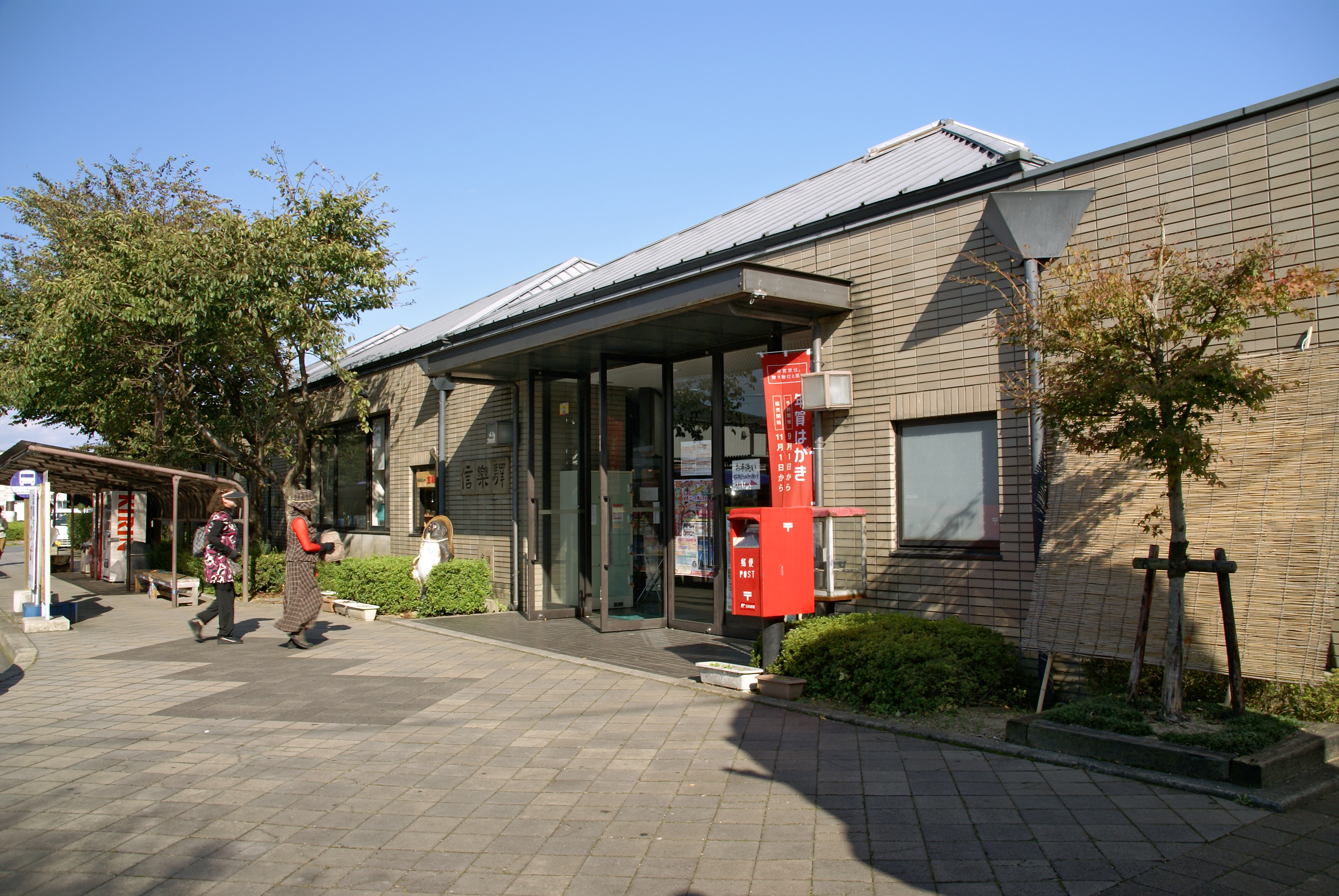
- Headquarters adjacent to Shigaraki Station

Overview
- Main regions: Shiga Prefecture, Japan
- Stations called at: 6
- Parent company: Kōka 55.1%); Shiga Prefecture (34.5%); Ohmi Railway (5.3%); Kōka City Mayor Liaison Council Shigaraki Area Mayor Association (2.9%); Shiga Bank (1.0%); As of 31 March 2019
- Dates of operation: February 10, 1987–present
- Predecessor: Japanese National Railways (JNR)

Technical
- Track gauge: 1,067 mm (3 ft 6 in)
- Electrification: not electrified
- Length: 14.7 km (9.1 miles)

Other
- Website: koka-skr.co.jp

Shigaraki Kohgen Railway Co., Ltd. (信楽高原鐵道株式会社, Shigaraki Kōgen Tetsudō Kabushiki-gaisha) is a Japanese third-sector railway company funded by Shiga Prefecture and the city of Koka.

The railway operates the Shigaraki Line (信楽線), a former JR West line that was transferred to the third sector in 1987. The Shigaraki Line connects Kibukawa on the JR West Kusatsu Line with Shigaraki.

== Route data ==
- Operating Company:
  - Shigaraki Kohgen Railway Co.
- Distance:
  - Kibukawa — Shigaraki: 14.7 km
- Gauge: 1,067 mm (3 ft 6 in)
- Stations: 6
- Double-track: None
- Electrification: Not electrified

== Stations ==
Shigaraki Kohgen Railway network.

| Station | Japanese | Distance (km) | | Transfers | Location | |
| Station | Japanese | Between stations | Total | Transfers | Location | |
|---|---|---|---|---|---|---|
| Kibukawa | 貴生川 | - | 0.0 | JR West Kusatsu Line ■ Ohmi Railway Main Line | Kōka | Shiga; Prefecture |
| Shigarakigūshi | 紫香楽宮跡 | 9.6 | 9.6 | | Kōka | Shiga; Prefecture |
| Kumoi | 雲井 | 0.6 | 10.2 | | Kōka | Shiga; Prefecture |
| Chokushi | 勅旨 | 2.2 | 12.4 | | Kōka | Shiga; Prefecture |
| Gyokukeijimae | 玉桂寺前 | 1.0 | 13.4 | | Kōka | Shiga; Prefecture |
| Shigaraki | 信楽 | 1.3 | 14.7 | | Kōka | Shiga; Prefecture |

== Rolling stock ==
- SKR310 series (since 2001)
- SKR400 series (since 2015)
- SKR500 series (since 5 February 2017)

As of February 2017, the company operates a fleet of four diesel railcars: SKR310 series cars SKR311 and SKR312, SKR400 series car SKR401, and SKR500 series car SKR501. The two SKR310 series diesel railcars were introduced in 2001, based on the earlier SKR300 series design but with more powerful engines. SKR400 series diesel railcar SKR401 was delivered to the line in September 2015. This replaced car SKR301, which was withdrawn from service on 3 October 2015. New SKR500 series diesel railcar SKR501 entered revenue service on the line from 5 February 2017. This replaced SKR205, which made its last run on 4 February 2017. While similar in design to the earlier SKR400 series car SKR401, SKR501 has transverse seating, whereas SKR401 has longitudinal bench seating.

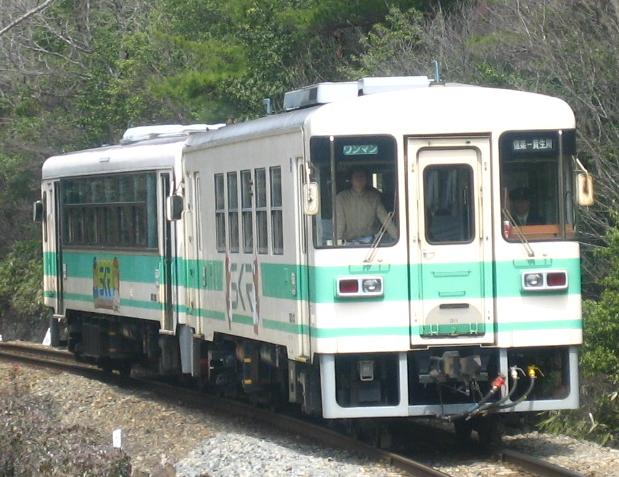
An SKR310 series diesel car

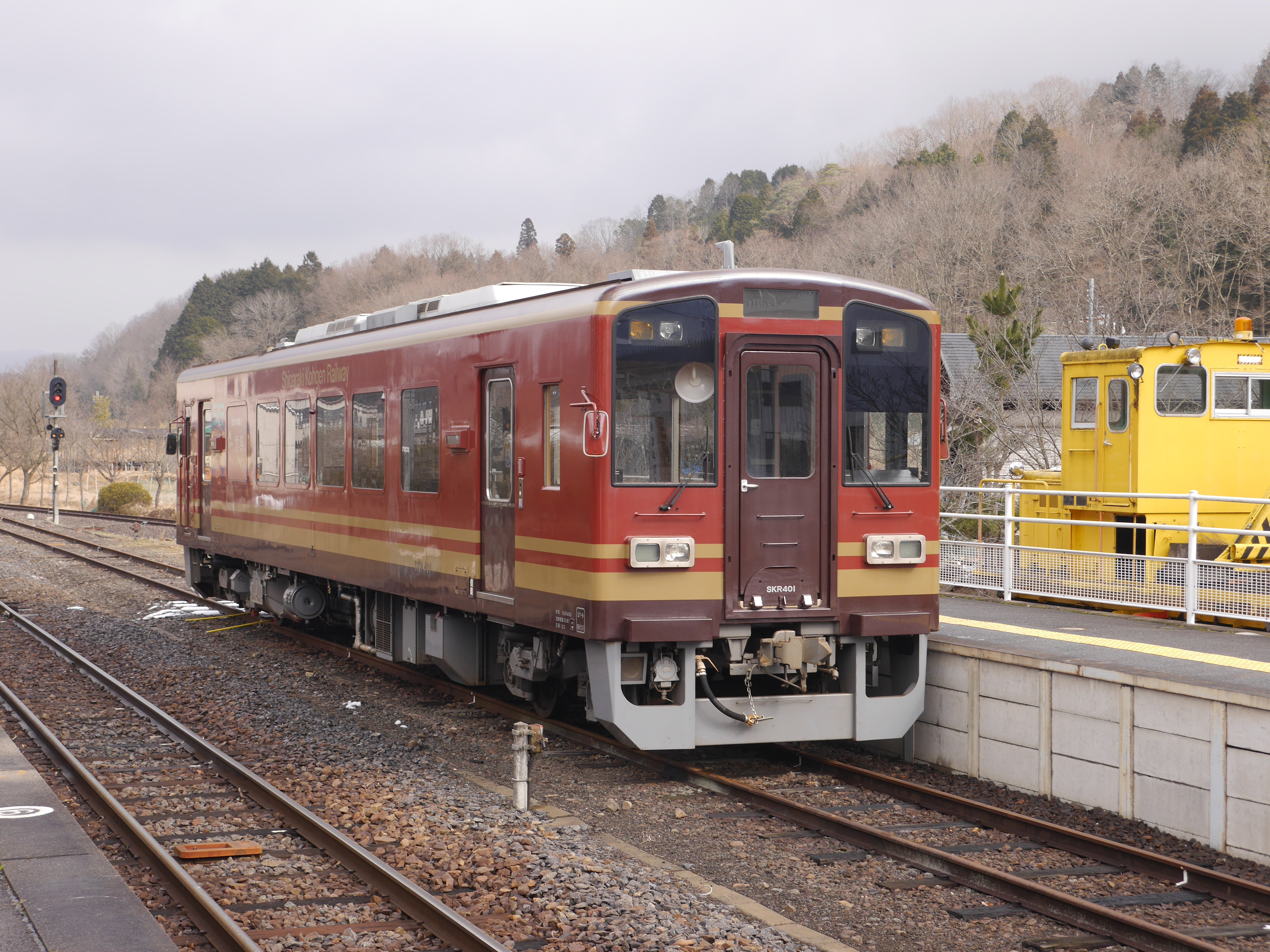
SKR401 in January 2017

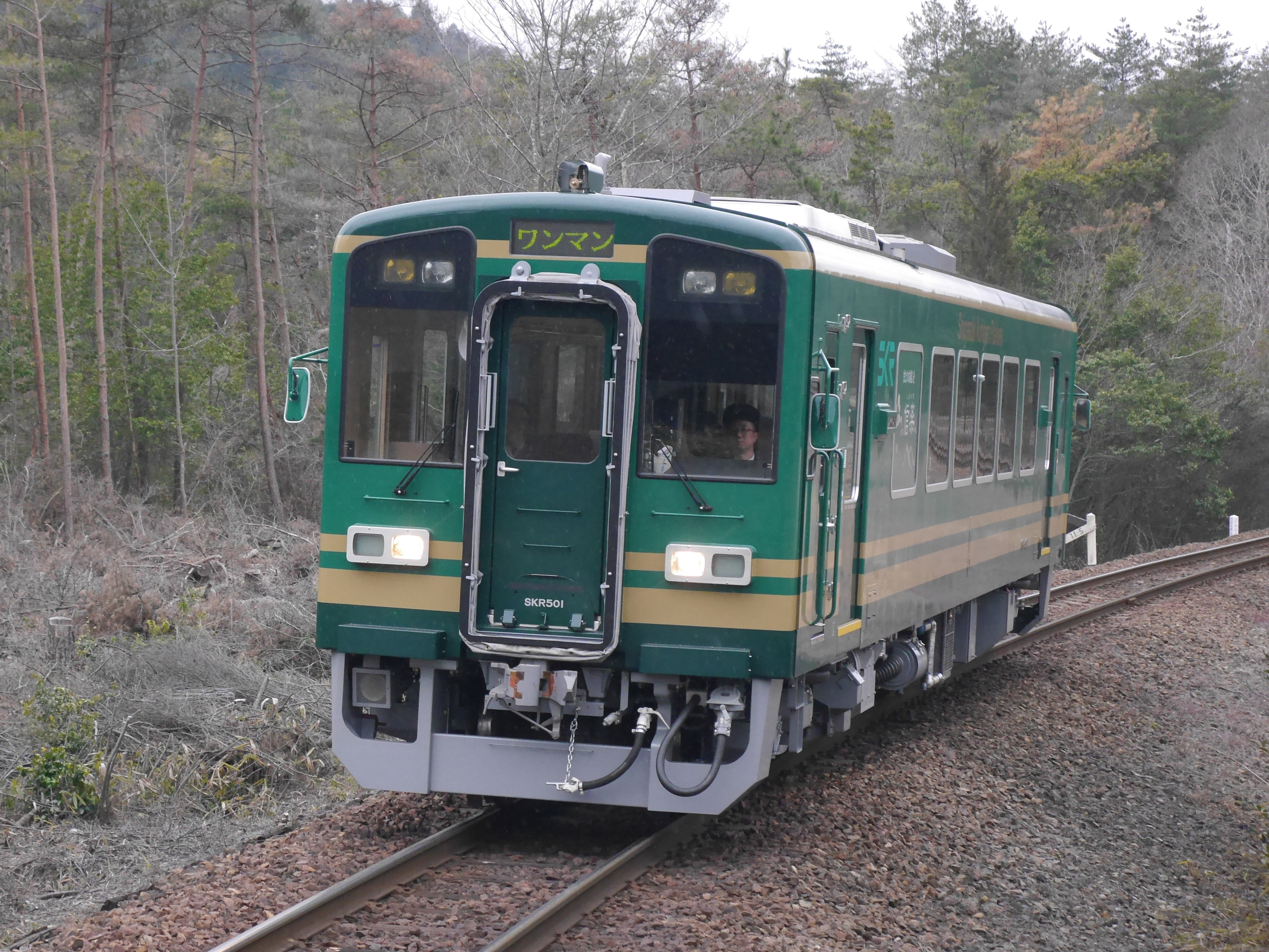
SKR501 in March 2017

=== Former rolling stock ===
- SKR200 series (x5, from 1987 until February 2017)
- SKR300 series (x1, from 1995 until October 2015)

Five SKR200 series railcars were introduced between 1987 and 1992. One SKR300 series car was introduced in 1995.

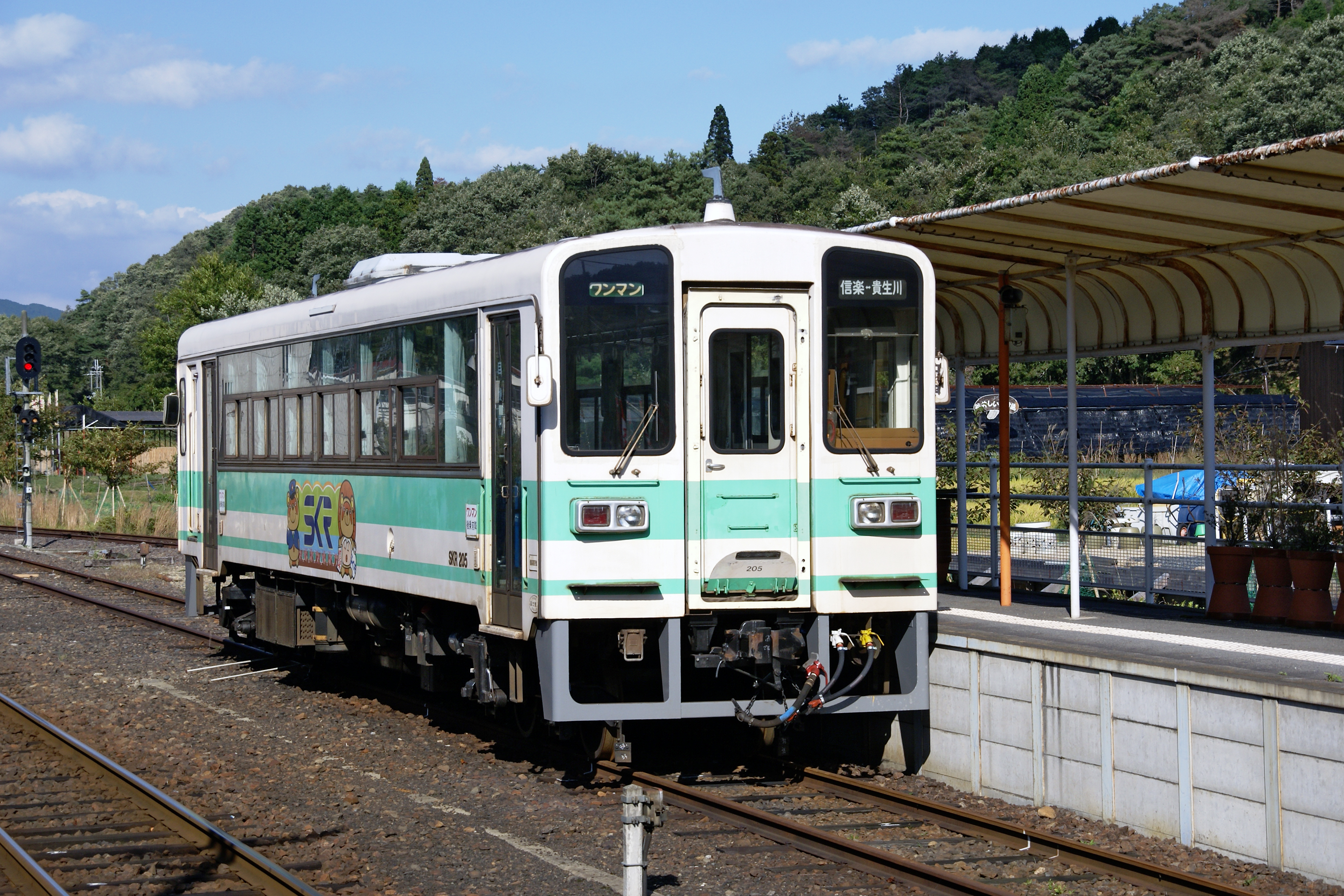
SKR200 series diesel railcar SKR205 in October 2007

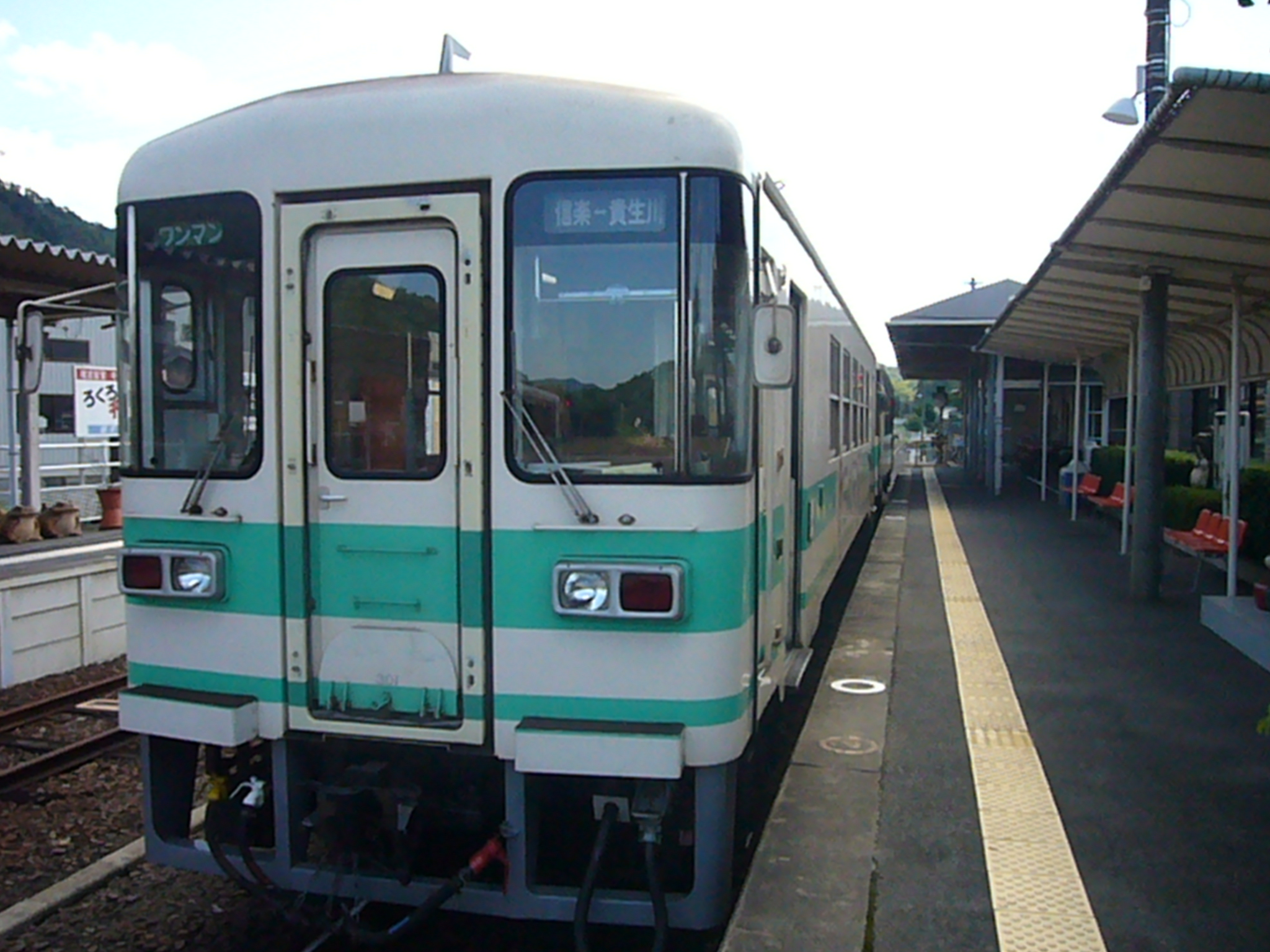
SKR301 in September 2006

== History ==
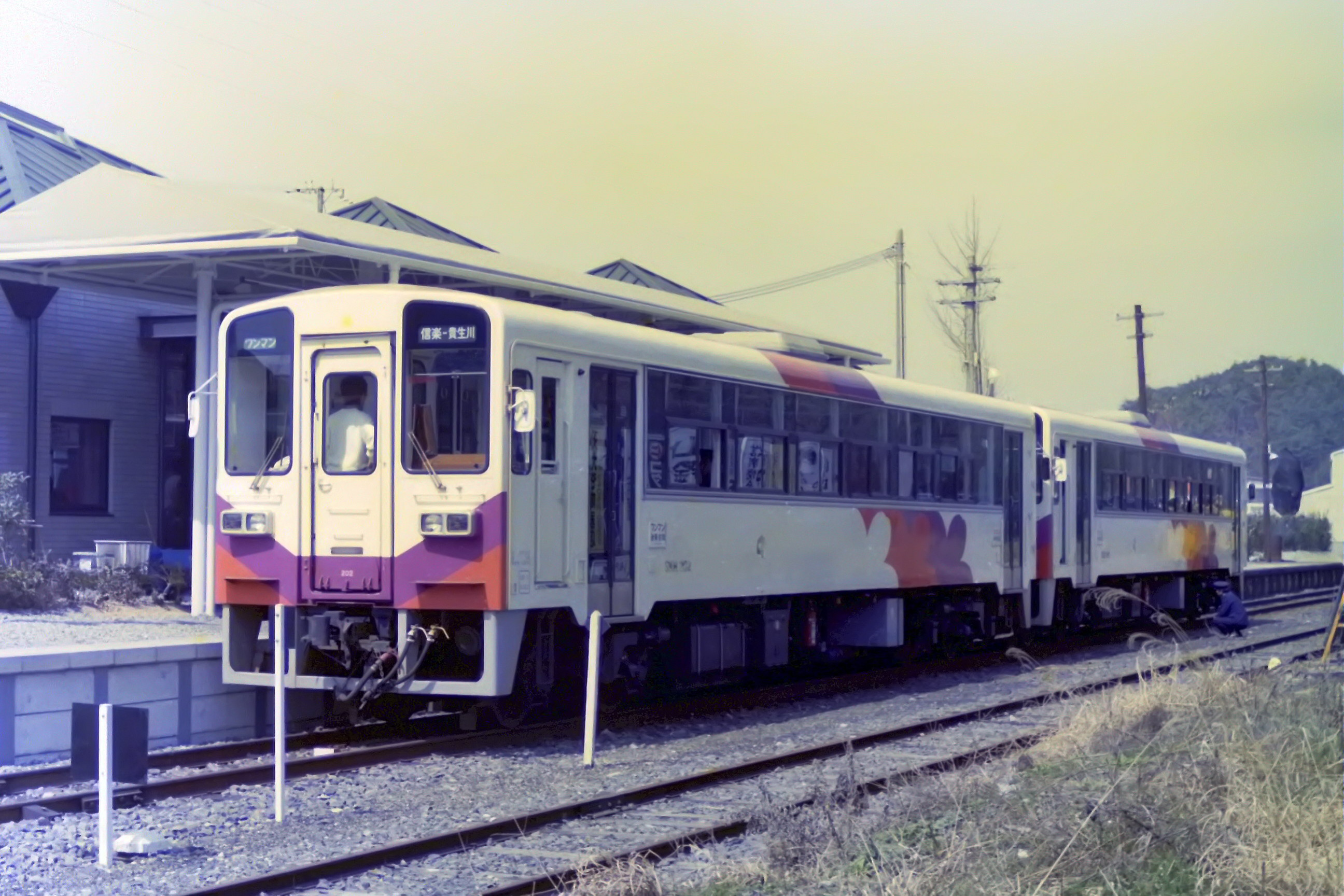
A pair of SKR200 series diesel railcars in 1988

The line was opened by the Japanese Government Railways on May 8, 1933. Freight services ceased in 1982.

The company was established on February 10, 1987, and started the railway operation on July 13, 1987, following the end of the operation by JR West the day before. Originally the company owned the railway facilities, but on April 1, 2013, the asset was transferred to the city of Kōka for 10-year free lease to the company as a part of the restructuring.

=== Service disruptions ===
The line has an unfortunate record in this regard, with services suspended between 1943 and 1947 due to being deemed non-essential during World War II and the track removed. The citizens' volunteer work contributed to the reopening of the line on July 25, 1947.

A bridge was washed out in 1953, and the line was out of service for a year whilst it was rebuilt.

The 1991 collision (see below) resulted in the suspension of services for six months.

The line was out of service from September 16, 2013, to November 29, 2014, as a result of another bridge washout caused by Typhoon Man-yi.

=== Accidents ===
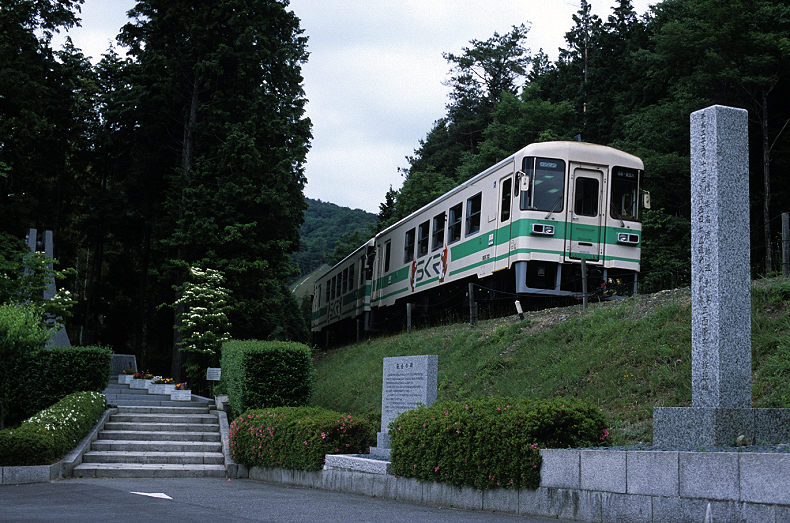
A train passing the memorial at the site of the 1991 crash

The Shigaraki train disaster happened on the line in May 1991, when a through train from JR West collided head-on with a Shigaraki Kohgen Railway train, killing 42 people.

== See also ==
- List of railway lines in Japan
