= Shigaraki Station =

Railway station in Kōka, Shiga Prefecture, Japan

Shigaraki Station 信楽駅
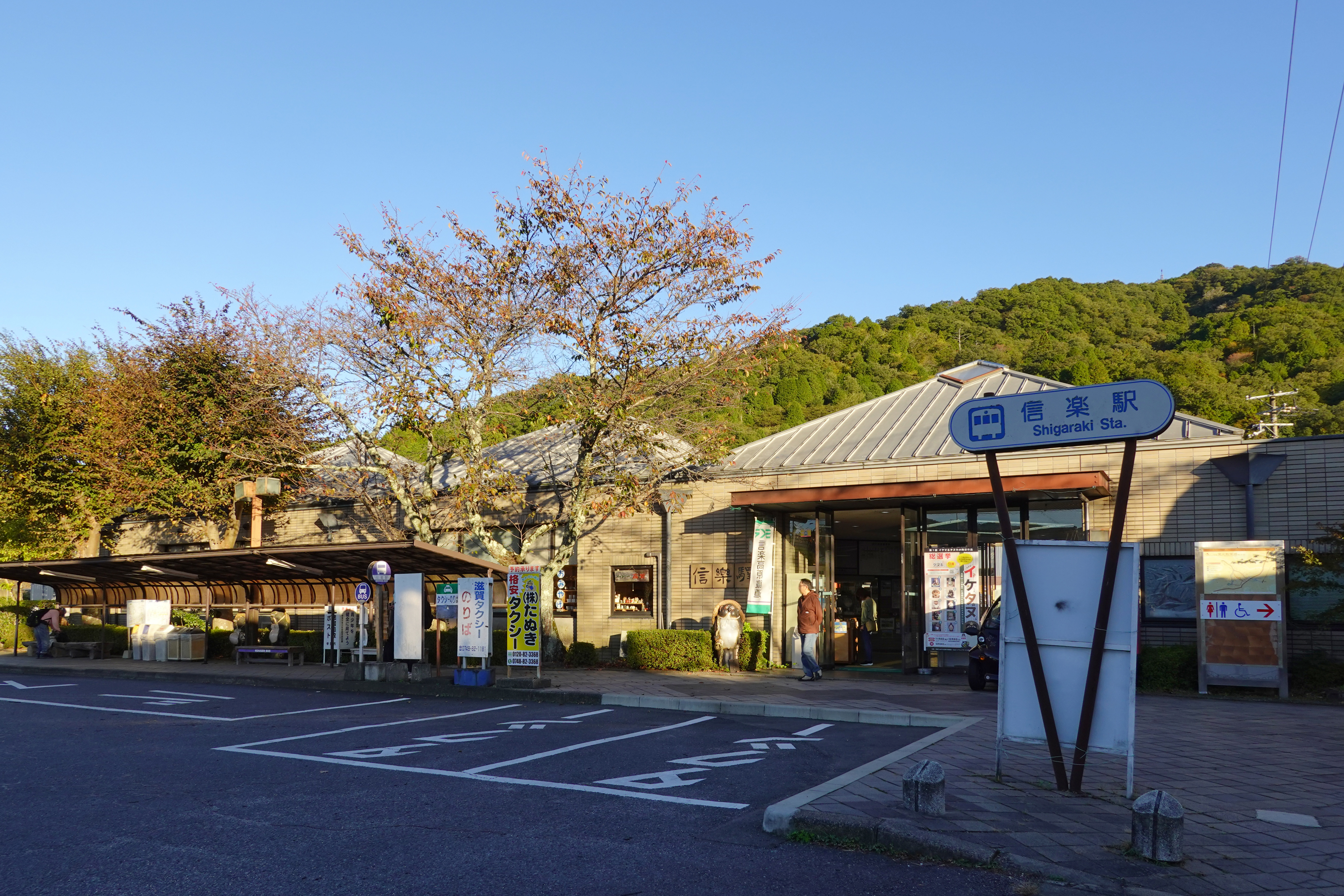
- Shigaraki Station

General information
- Location: 192 Shigarakicho Nagano, Kōka-shi, Shiga-ken 529-1851; Japan
- Coordinates: 34.8768°N 136.0610°E
- Operator: Shigaraki Kohgen Railway
- Line: Shigaraki Line
- Distance: 14.7 km from Kibukawa
- Platforms: 2 side platforms

Construction
- Structure type: At-grade

History
- Opened: 8 May 1933

Passengers
- 658 per day (2017)
Location
- Location within Shiga Prefecture Location within Japan

Shigaraki Station (信楽駅, Shigaraki eki) is a passenger railway station located in the city of Kōka, Shiga, Japan operated by the third-sector Shigaraki Kohgen Railway.

== Lines ==
Shigaraki Station is a terminal station of the Shigaraki Line, and is 14.7 kilometers from the opposing terminus of the line at Kibukawa.

== Station layout ==
The station consists of two opposed side platforms connected by a level crossing, of which only the platform adjacent to the station is in use. The station is staffed. Directly outside of the station, there is 5.3 m tall statue of a bake-danuki, which is a well-known product of the area. The statue's clothes are changed depending on the season. Items recovered from Shigaraki train disaster are on display within the station building.

== Adjacent stations ==
«	Service	»
Shigaraki Line
Gyokukeijimae	Local	Terminus

== History ==
Shigaraki Station opened on May 8, 1933 as a station of the Japanese Government Railway (JGR). The station was closed from October 1, 1943 to July 25, 1947, when it reopened as a station of the Japan National Railway (JNR). The station became part of the West Japan Railway Company on April 1, 1987 due to the privatization and dissolution of the JNR and was transferred to the Shigaraki Kohgen Railway on July 13, 1987.

== Passenger statistics ==
Ridership per day
Year	Ridership
2011	852
2012	861
2013	759
2014	691
2015	742
2016	864
2017	658

== Surrounding area ==
- former Shigaraki town hall
- Shigaraki Traditional Industry Center
- Shigaraki Central Hospital

== Gallery ==
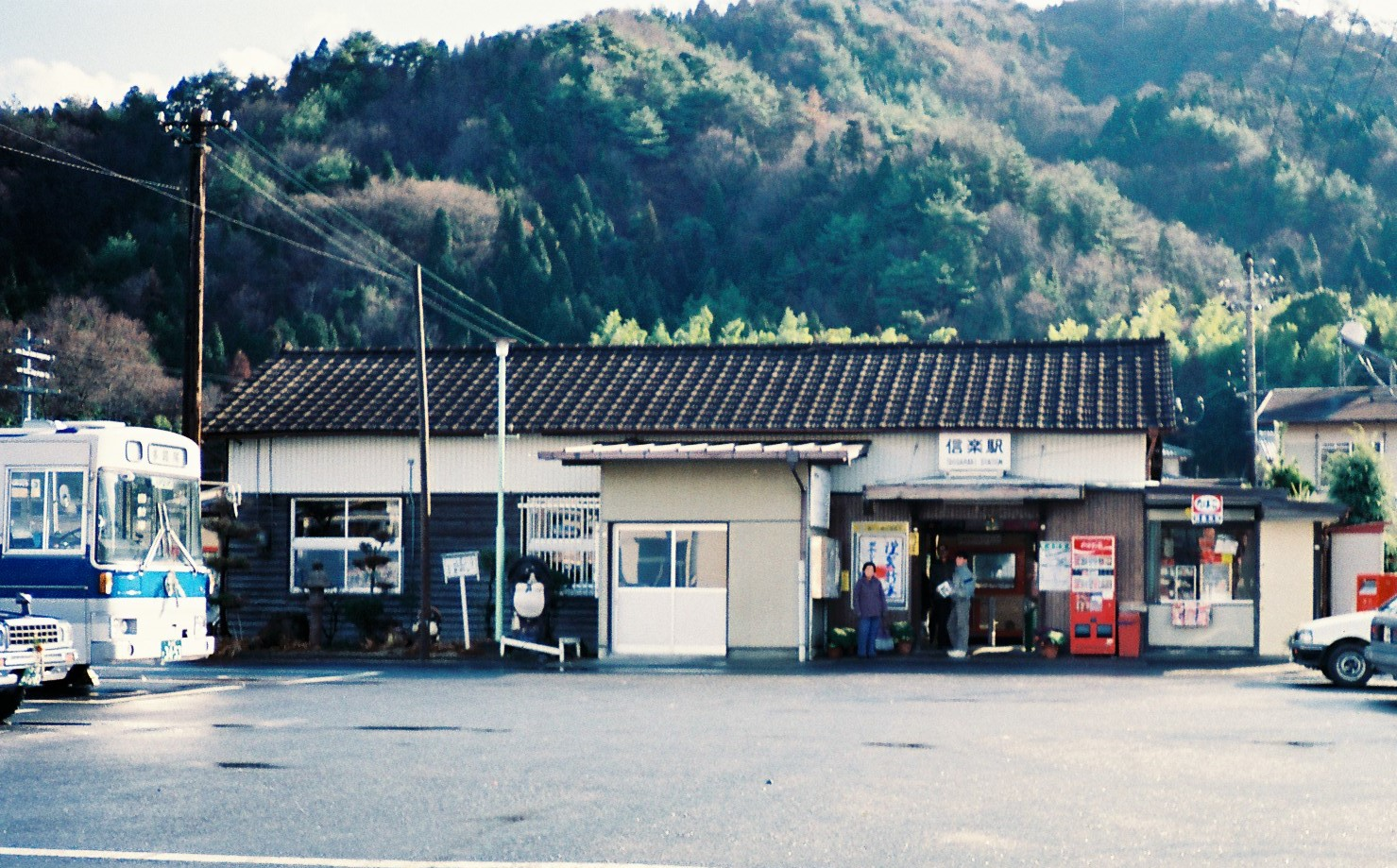
Shigaraki Station prior to its renovation

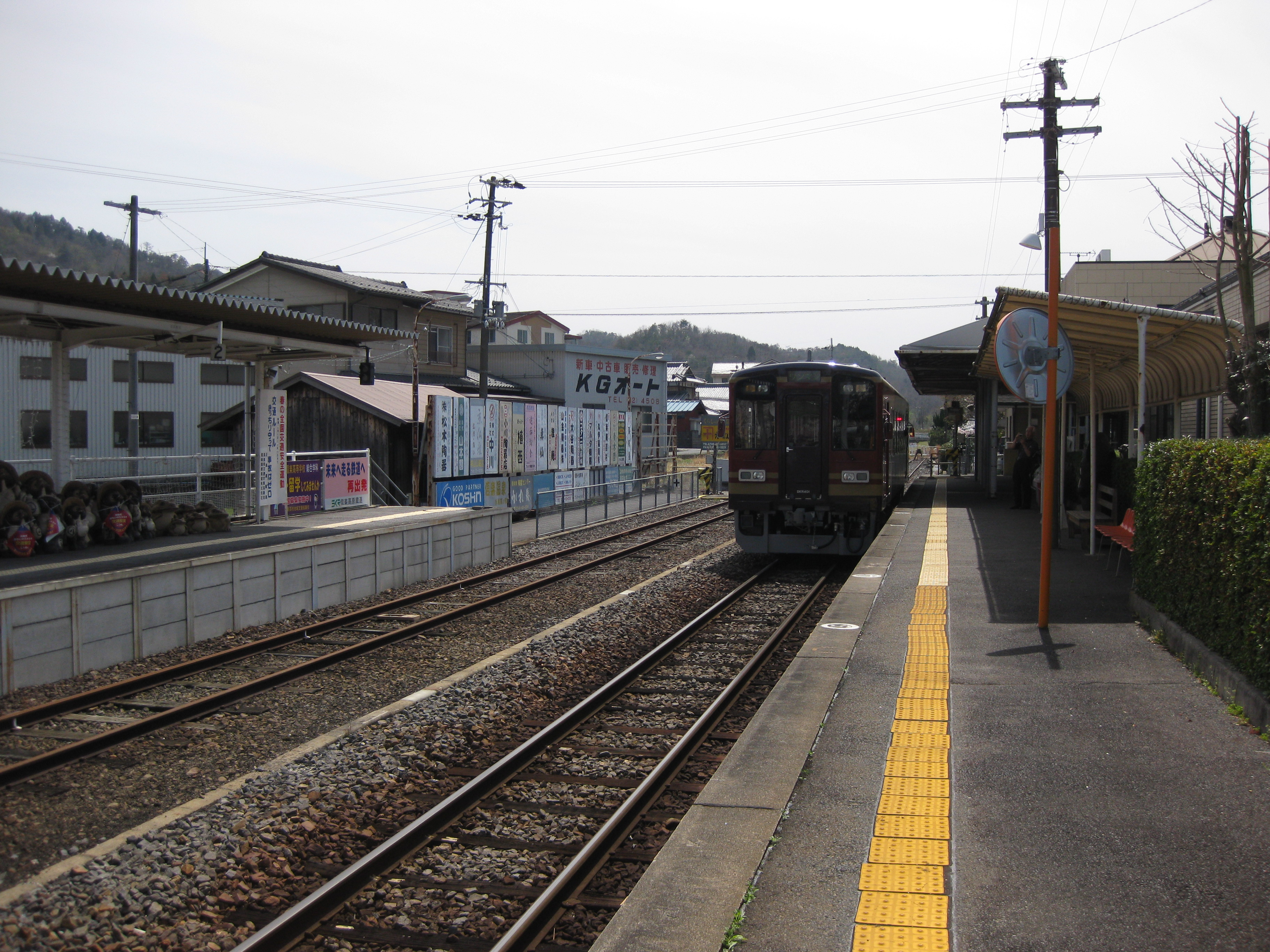
A SKR400 series train approaching Shigaraki Station

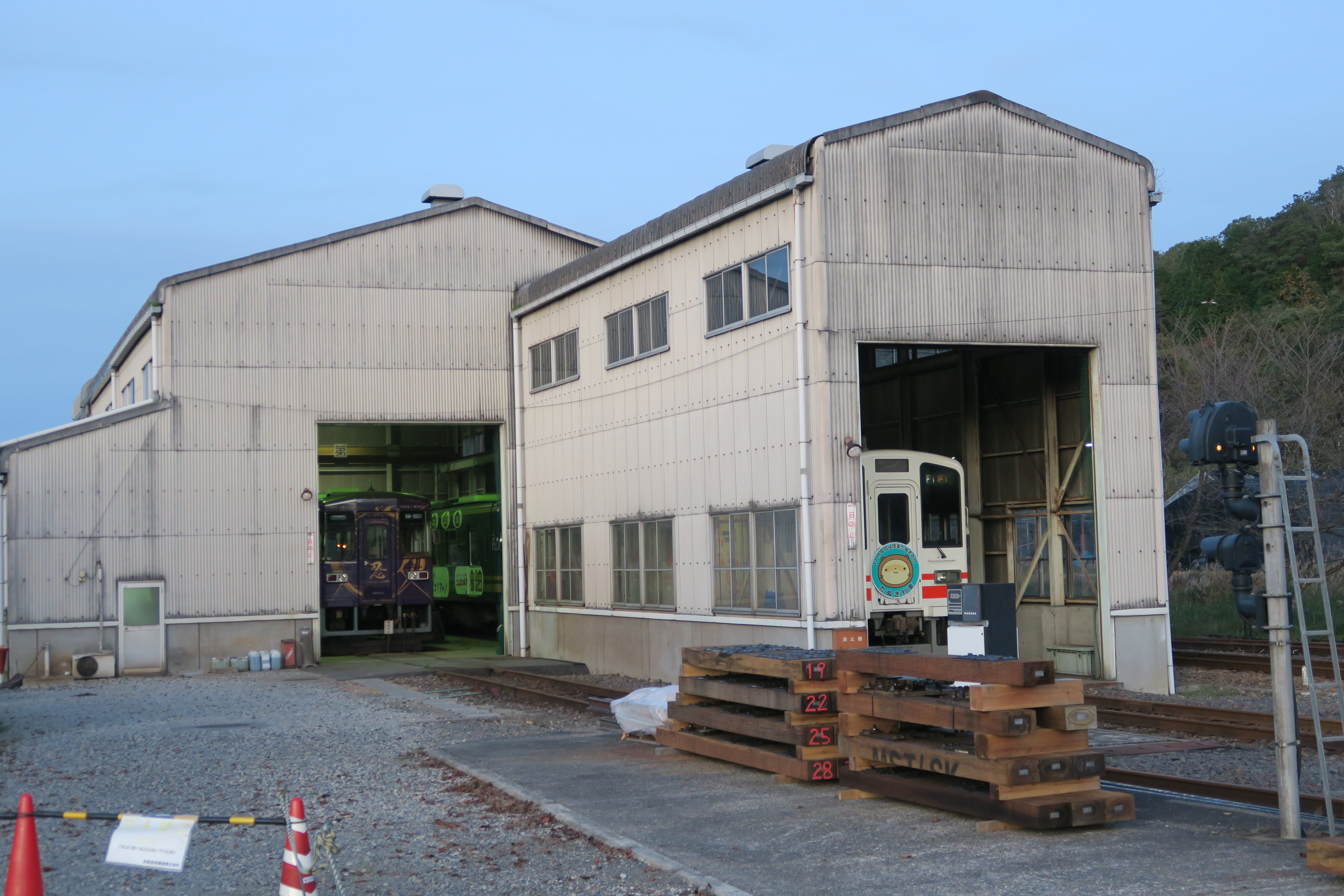
Trains at the maintenance depot north of the station

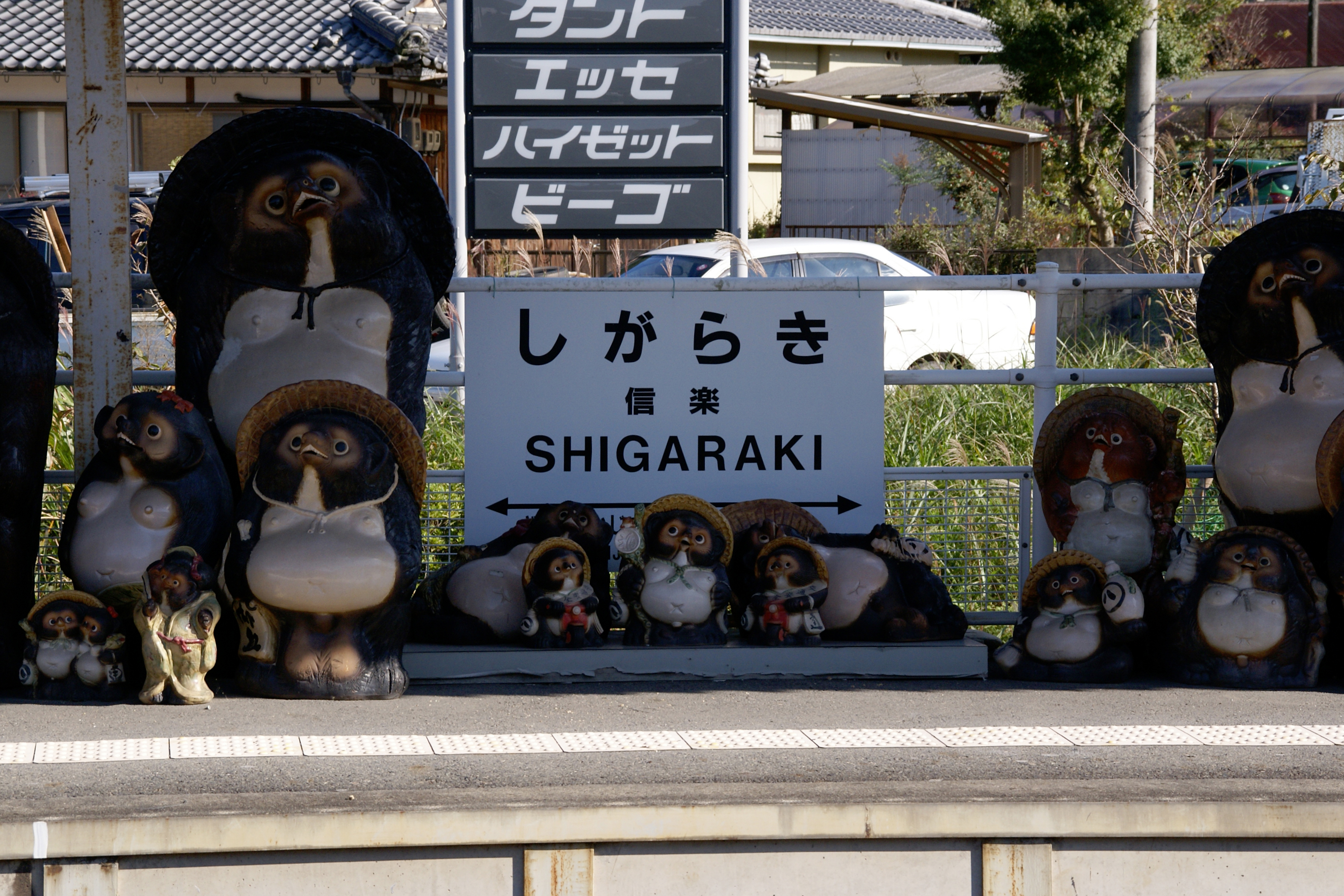
Some of the many Shigaraki ware bake-danuki statues decorating the station

== See also ==
- List of railway stations in Japan
