= Shigarakigūshi Station =

Railway station in Kōka, Shiga Prefecture, Japan

Shigarakigūshi Station 紫香楽宮跡駅
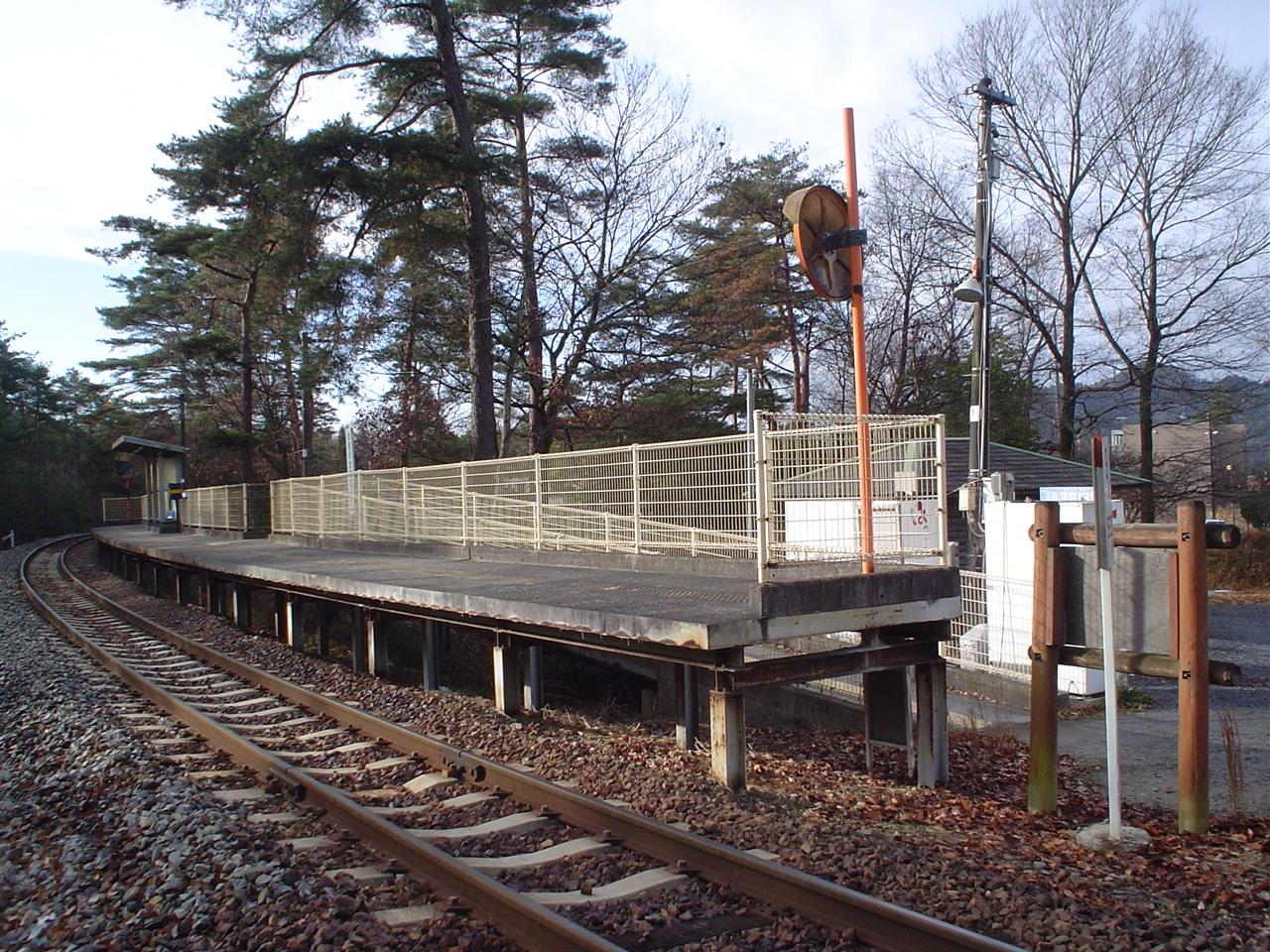
- Shigarakigūshi Station, December 2008

General information
- Location: Shigarakichomaki, Kōka-shi, Shiga-ken 529-1803; Japan
- Coordinates: 34.9164°N 136.0879°E
- Operator: Shigaraki Kohgen Railway
- Line: Shigaraki Line
- Distance: 9.6 km from Kibukawa
- Platforms: 1 side platform

Construction
- Structure type: At-grade

Other information
- Status: Unstaffed

History
- Opened: 13 July 1987

Passengers
- 60 per day (2017)
Location
- Location within Shiga Prefecture Location within Japan

Shigarakigūshi Station (紫香楽宮跡駅, Shigarakigūshi eki) is a passenger railway station located in the city of Kōka, Shiga, Japan operated by the third-sector Shigaraki Kohgen Railway. The station name is derived from the ruins of Shigaraki Palace, located nearby.

== Lines ==
Shigarakigūshi Station is a station on the Shigaraki Line, and is 9.6 kilometers from the starting point of the line at Kibukawa.

== Station layout ==
The station consists of one side platform serving single bi-directional track. There is no station building, and the station is unattended.

== Adjacent stations ==
«	Service	»
Shigaraki Line
Kibukawa	Local	Kumoi

== History ==
Shigarakigūshi Station opened on July 13, 1987.

== Passenger statistics ==
Ridership per day
Year	Ridership
2011	78
2012	78
2013	68
2014	62
2015	67
2016	72
2017	60

== Surrounding area ==
- Shigaraki Palace ruins
- Shigaraki Hospital
- Japan National Route 307
- Tokai Nature Trail

== See also ==
- List of railway stations in Japan
