= Kibukawa Station =

Railway station in Kōka, Shiga Prefecture, Japan

Kibukawa Station 貴生川駅
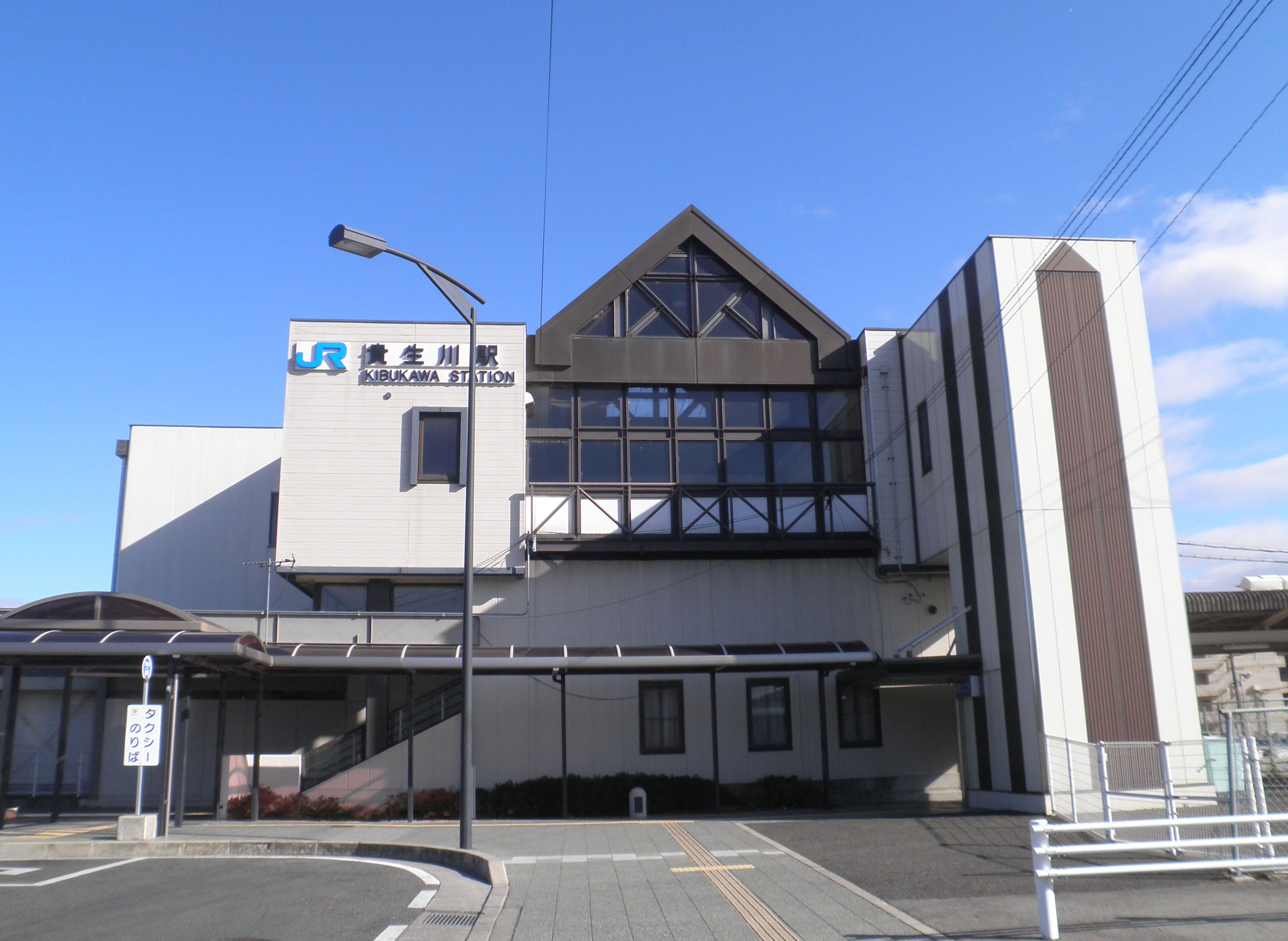
- Kibukawa Station in January 2011

General information
- Location: Minakuchichō Mushono, Kōka-shi, Shiga-ken 528-0041; Japan
- Coordinates: 34°57′08″N 136°09′14″E
- Operator: JR West; Ohmi Railway; Shigaraki Kohgen Railway
- Lines: C Kusatsu Line; ■ Ohmi Railway Main Line; ■ Shigaraki Line
- Distance: 47.7 km from Maibara
- Platforms: 2 island + 1 side platforms

Other information
- Station code: OR37
- Website: Official website

Passengers
- FY 2023: 7,140 (JR West); 825 (Ohmi, FY 2016)
Location
- Location within Shiga Prefecture Location within Japan

Kibukawa Station (貴生川駅, Kibukawa-eki) is an interchange passenger railway station located in the city of Kōka, Shiga, Japan. It is operated by West Japan Railway Company (JR West), the private Ohmi Railway, and the third sector Shigaraki Kohgen Railway.

== Lines ==
Kibukawa Station is served by the JR Kusatsu Line and is 15.3 kilometers from the starting point of that line at Tsuge. It is also served by the Ohmi Railway Main Line and is 47.7 kilometers from the terminus of that line at Maibara. The station is also a terminus for the Shigaraki Line, and is 14.7 kilometers from the opposing terminus of the line at Shigaraki.

== Layout ==
=== JR West, Shigaraki Kohgen Railway ===
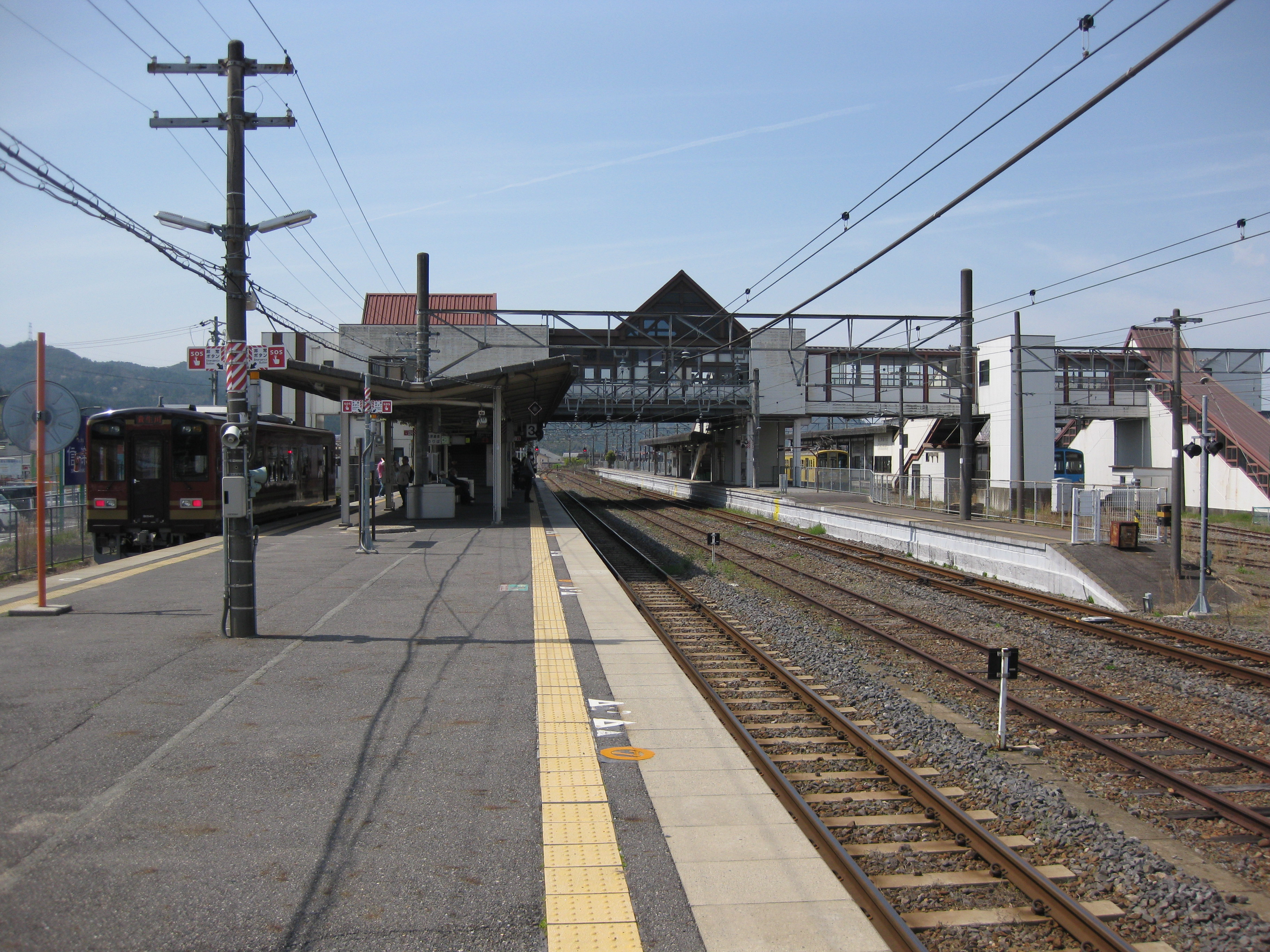
The JR West and Shigaraki Kohgen Railway platforms in April 2016

JR West uses one island platform serving two tracks. The Shigaraki Line uses one side platform serving one track. The station building is elevated and above the tracks, and the station is attended.

1	■ Kusatsu Line	for Tsuge (usually used)
3	■ Kusatsu Line	for Kusatsu and Kyoto (usually used)
Shigaraki Line	■ Shigaraki Kohgen Railway Shigaraki Line	for Shigaraki

=== Ohmi Railway ===
The Ohmi Railway uses an island platform serving two tracks on the ground.

1, 2	■ Main Line (Minakuchi Gamono Line)	for Yōkaichi, Hikone and Maibara

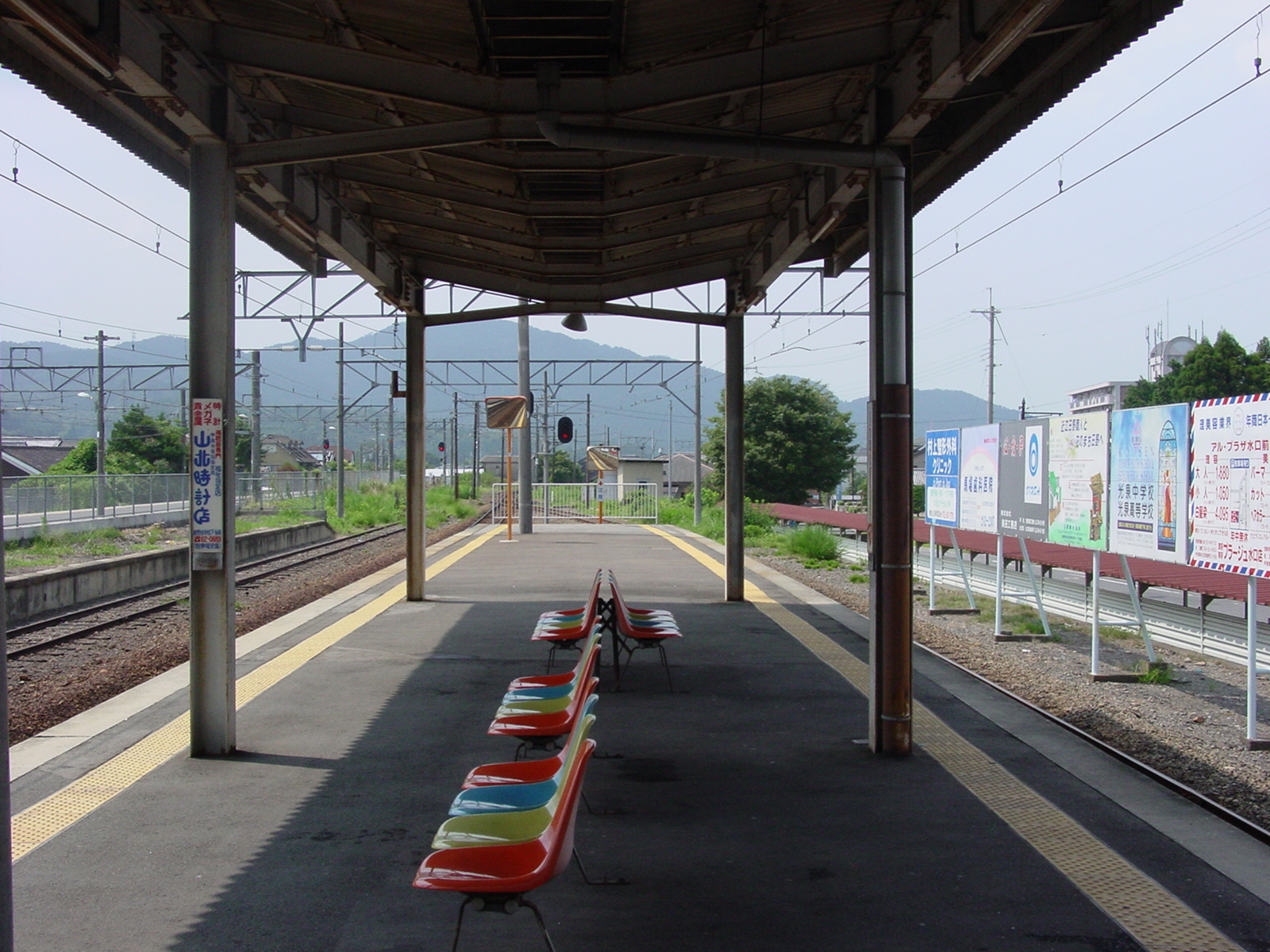
The Ohmi Railway platform in August 2004

== Adjacent stations ==
«	Service	»
Kusatsu Line
Kōnan	-	Mikumo
Shigaraki Kohgen Railway Shigaraki Line
Terminus	-	Shigarakigūshi
Ohmi Railway Main Line (Minakuchi Gamono Line)
Minakuchi Jōnan	-	Terminus

== History ==
Kibukawa Station opened on December 28, 1900 for both the Kusatsu Line and the Ohmi Main Line. The Shigaraki Line began operations on May 8, 1933. The Kusatsu Line and Shigaraki Line portions of the station became part of the West Japan Railway Company on April 1, 1987 due to the privatization and dissolution of the JNR and the Shigaraki Line portion was transferred to the Shigaraki Kohgen Railway on July 13, 1987.

== Passenger statistics ==
In fiscal 2018, the JR / Shigaraki portion of the station was used by an average of 4,121 passengers daily (boarding passengers only). The Ohmi Railway portion of the station was used by 825 passengers daily in 2016.

== Surrounding area ==
- Koka City Mizuguchi Medical Care Center
- Koka City Kibukawa Community Center
- Kibukawa Post Office
- Japan National Route 307
- Somagawa Sports Park

== See also ==
- List of railway stations in Japan
