= Japan National Route 307 =

National highway in Japan

National Route 307
- 国道307号
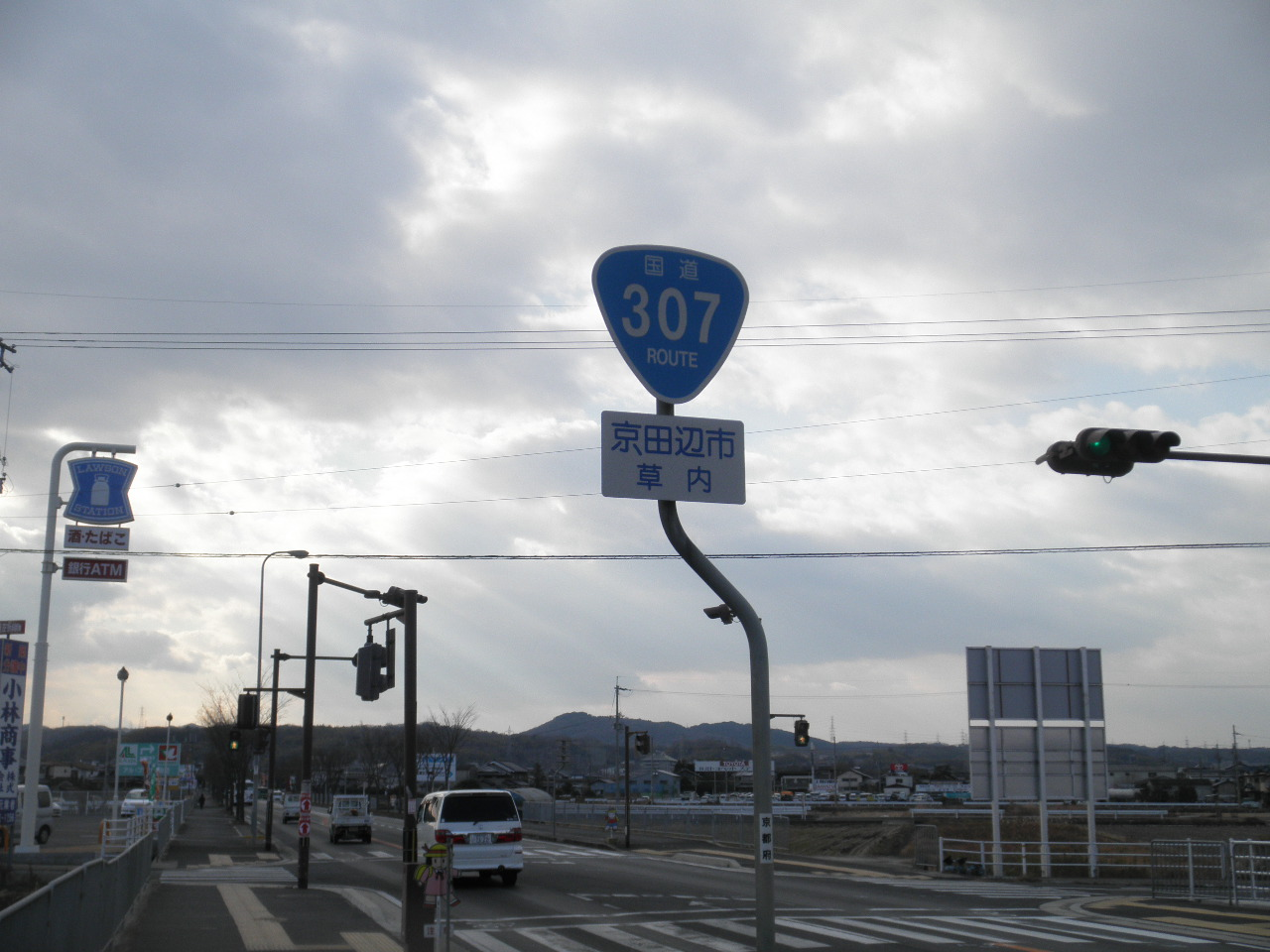

Route information
- Length: 103.7 km (64.4 mi)

Location
- Country: Japan

Highway system
- National highways of Japan; Expressways of Japan
← National Route 306	→ National Route 308

National Route 307 is a national highway of Japan connecting Hikone, Shiga and Hirakata, Osaka in Japan, with a total length of 103.7 km (64.44 mi).
