= List of cities in Kyoto Prefecture by population =

The following list sorts all cities (including towns) in the Japanese prefecture of Kyoto with a population of more than 5,000 according to the 2020 Census. As of October 1, 2020, 22 places fulfill this criterion and are listed here. This list refers only to the population of individual cities, towns and villages within their defined limits, which does not include other municipalities or suburban areas within urban agglomerations.

== List ==
The following table lists the 22 cities and towns in Kyoto with a population of at least 5,000 on October 1, 2020, according to the 2020 Census. The table also gives an overview of the evolution of the population since the 1995 census.

Rank (2020)	Name	Status	2020	2015	2010	2005	2000	1995
1	Kyoto	City	1,464,890	1,475,183	1,474,015	1,474,811	1,474,471	1,470,902
2	Uji	City	179,783	184,678	189,609	189,591	189,112	184,830
3	Kameoka	City	86,197	89,479	92,399	93,996	94,555	92,398
4	Nagaokakyō	City	80,649	80,090	79,844	78,335	77,846	78,697
5	Maizuru	City	80,383	83,990	88,669	91,733	94,050	94,784
6	Kizugawa	City	77,960	72,840	69,761	63,649	58,809	52,436
7	Fukuchiyama	City	77,349	78,935	79,652	81,977	83,120	82,555
8	Jōyō	City	74,643	76,869	80,037	81,636	84,346	85,398
9	Kyōtanabe	City	73,773	70,835	67,910	64,008	59,577	53,040
10	Yawata	City	70,479	72,664	74,227	74,252	73,682	75,779
11	Mukō	City	56,882	53,380	54,328	55,041	53,425	53,290
12	Kyōtango	City	50,867	55,054	59,038	62,723	65,578	67,208
13	Seika	Town	36,220	36,376	35,630	34,236	26,357	22,691
14	Ayabe	City	31,878	33,821	35,836	37,755	38,881	39,981
15	Nantan	City	31,650	33,145	35,214	36,736	37,617	37,841
16	Yosano	Town	20,107	21,834	23,454	24,906	25,593	25,939
17	Miyazu	City	16,769	18,426	19,948	21,512	23,276	24,937
18	Ōyamazaki	Town	15,970	15,181	15,121	15,191	15,736	15,879
19	Kumiyama	Town	15,280	15,805	15,914	16,610	17,080	18,133
20	Kyōtamba	Town	12,913	14,453	15,732	16,893	17,929	18,785
21	Ujitawara	Town	8,923	9,319	9,711	10,060	9,840	9,122
22	Ide	Town	7,411	7,910	8,447	8,951	9,102	9,438

== Gallery ==
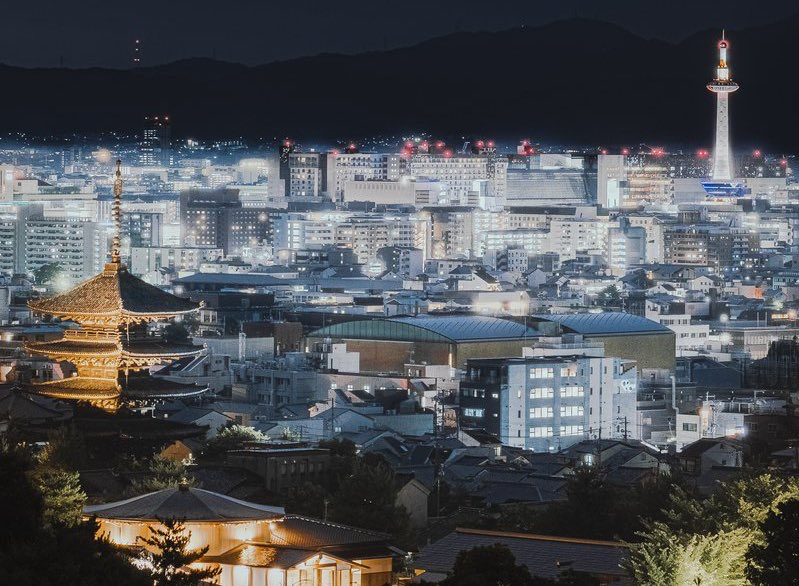
01.Kyoto

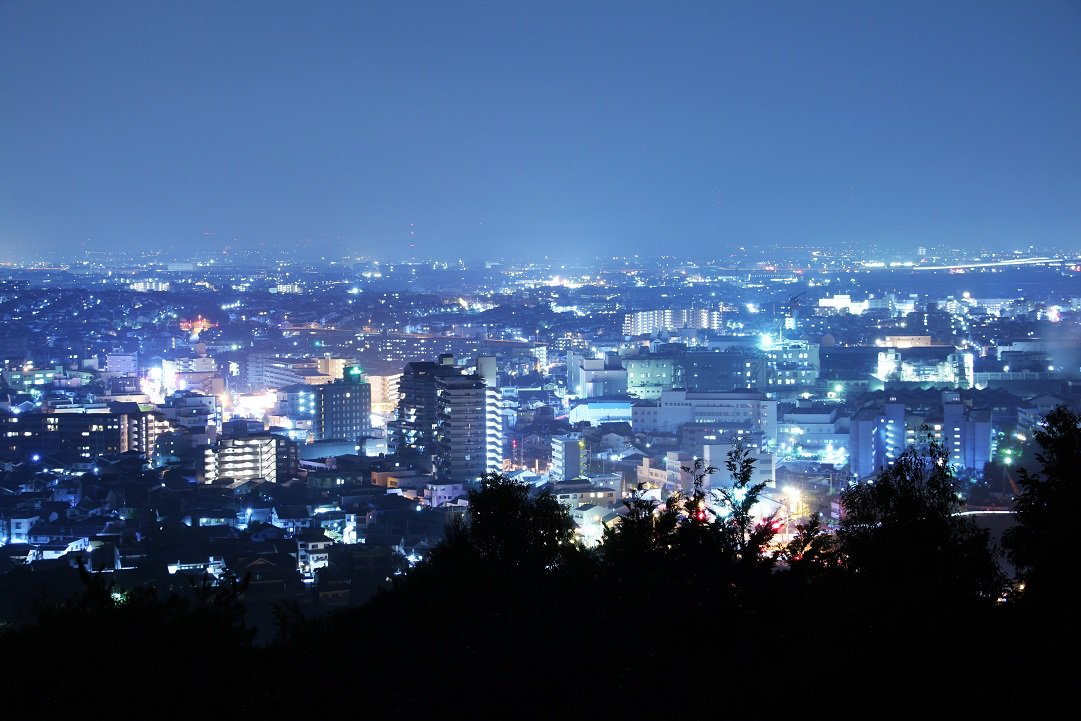
02.Uji

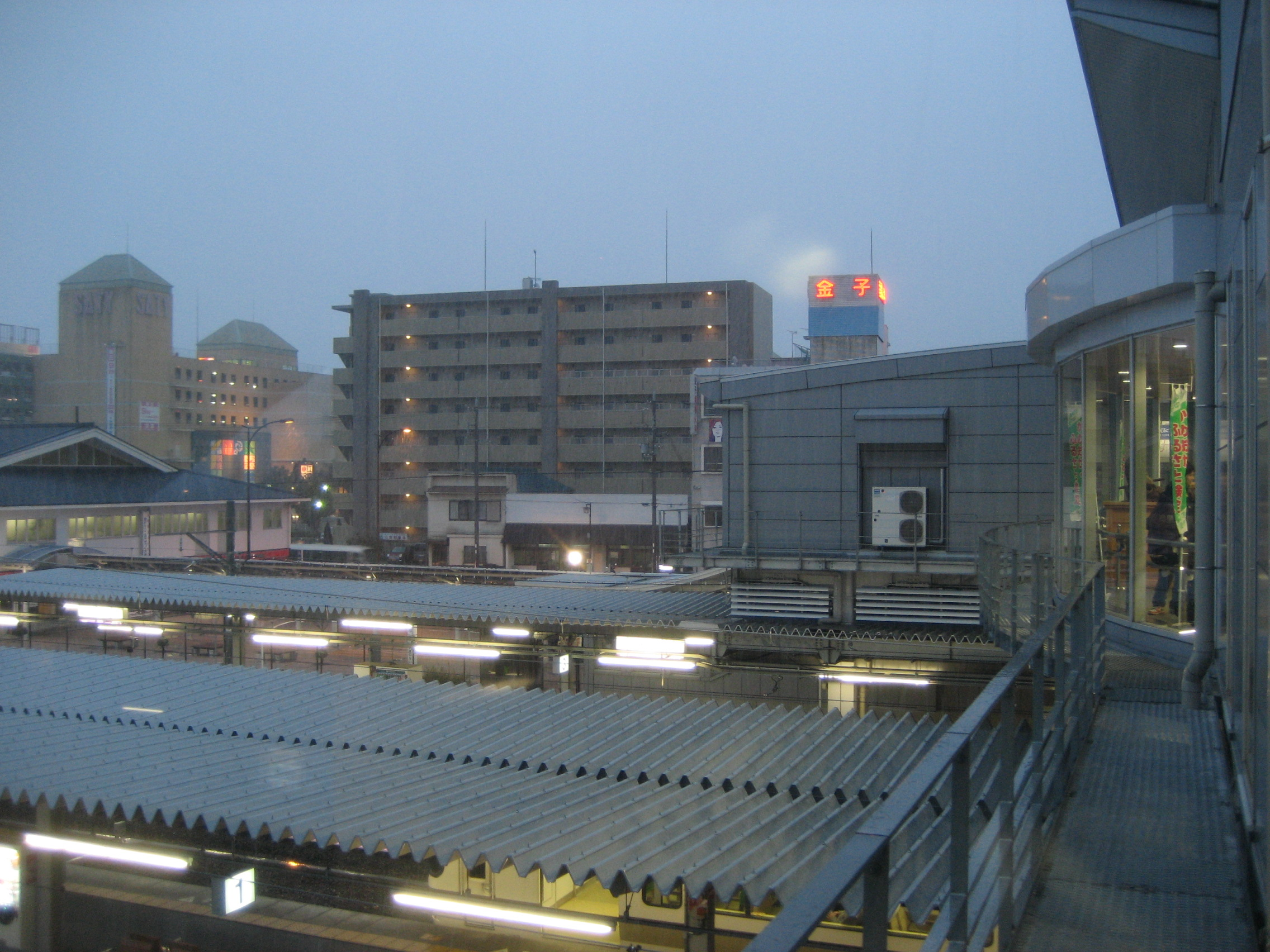
03.Kameoka

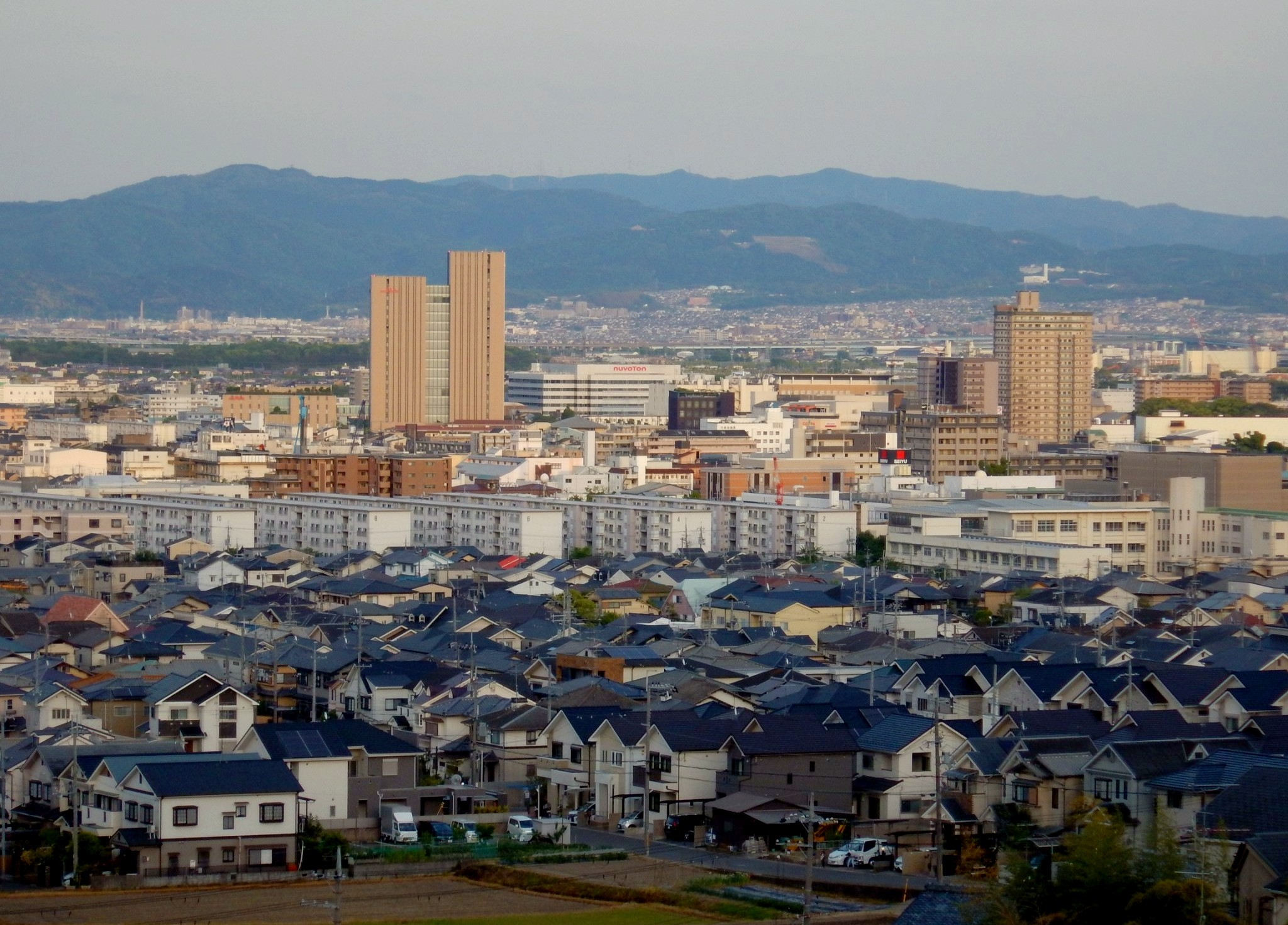
04.Nagaokakyō

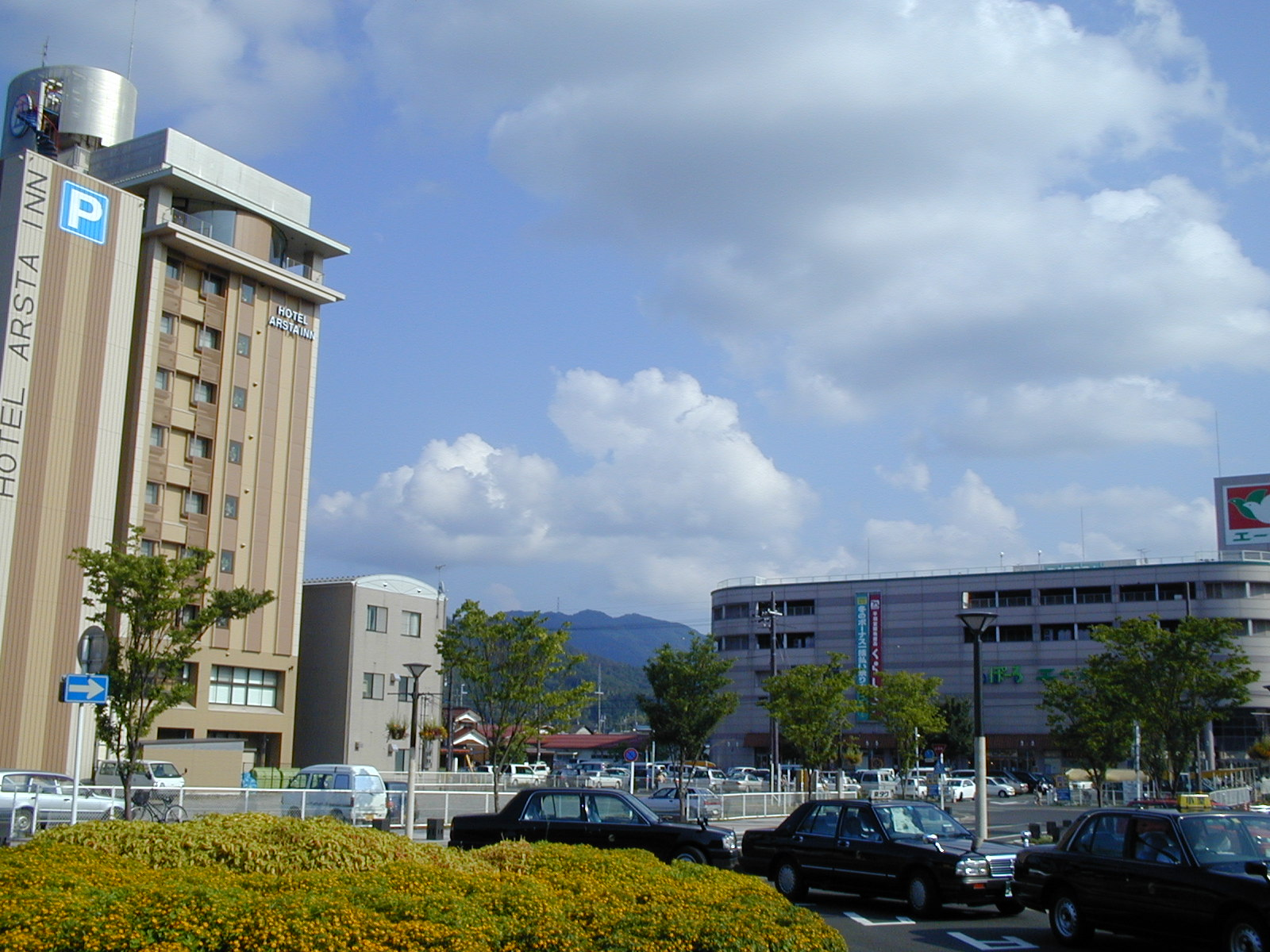
05.Maizuru

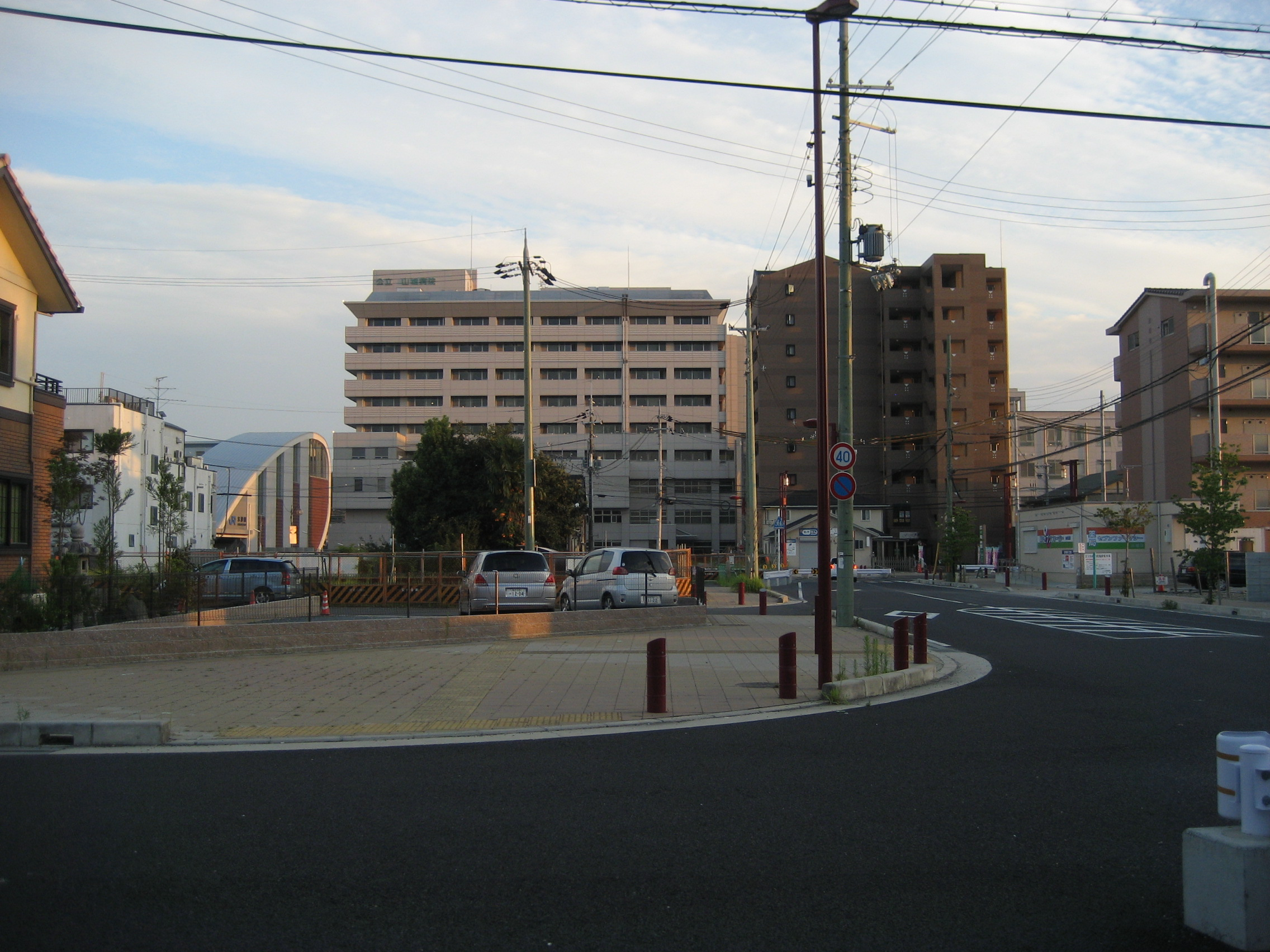
06.Kizugawa

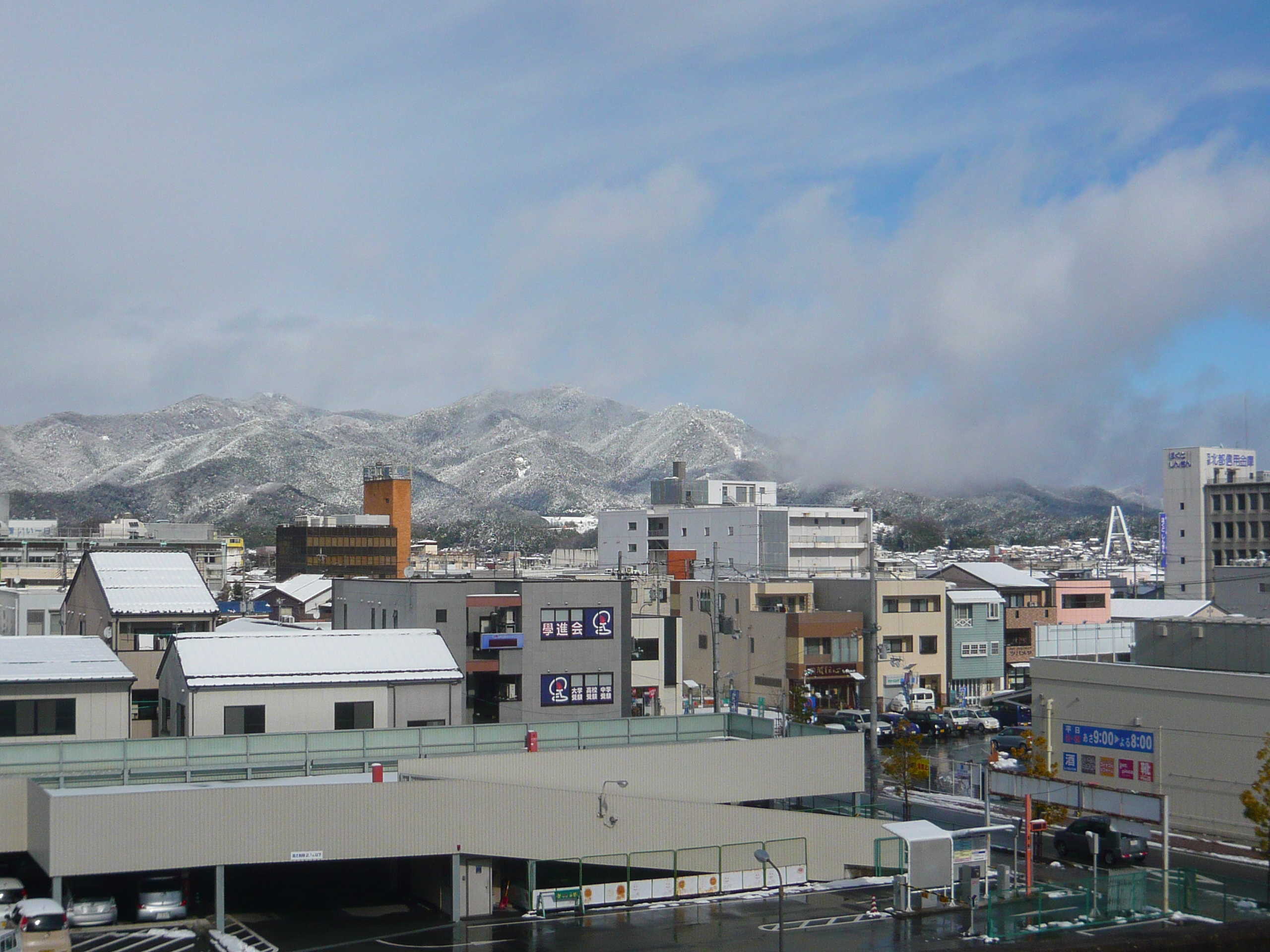
07.Fukuchiyama

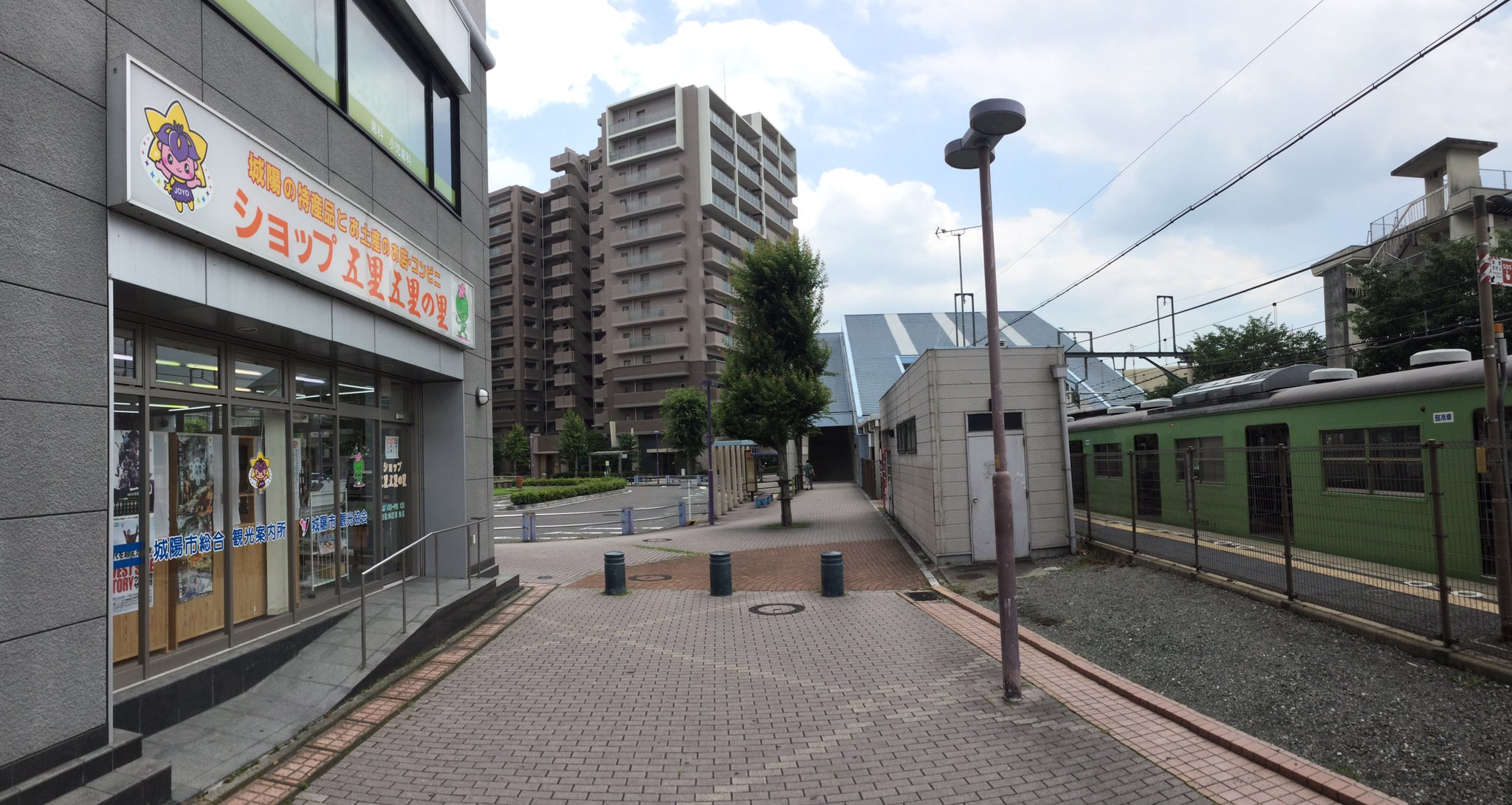
08.Jōyō

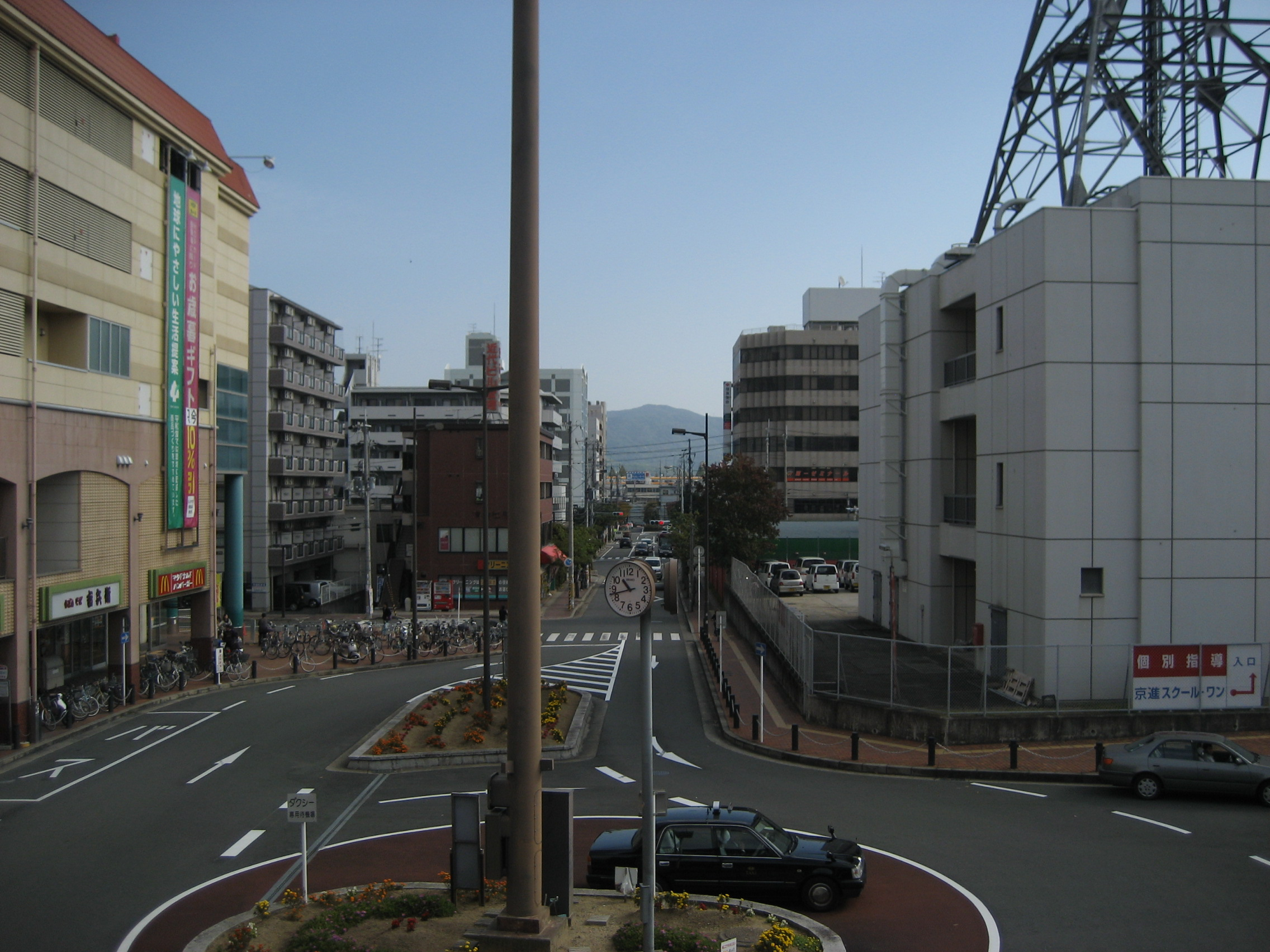
9.Kyōtanabe

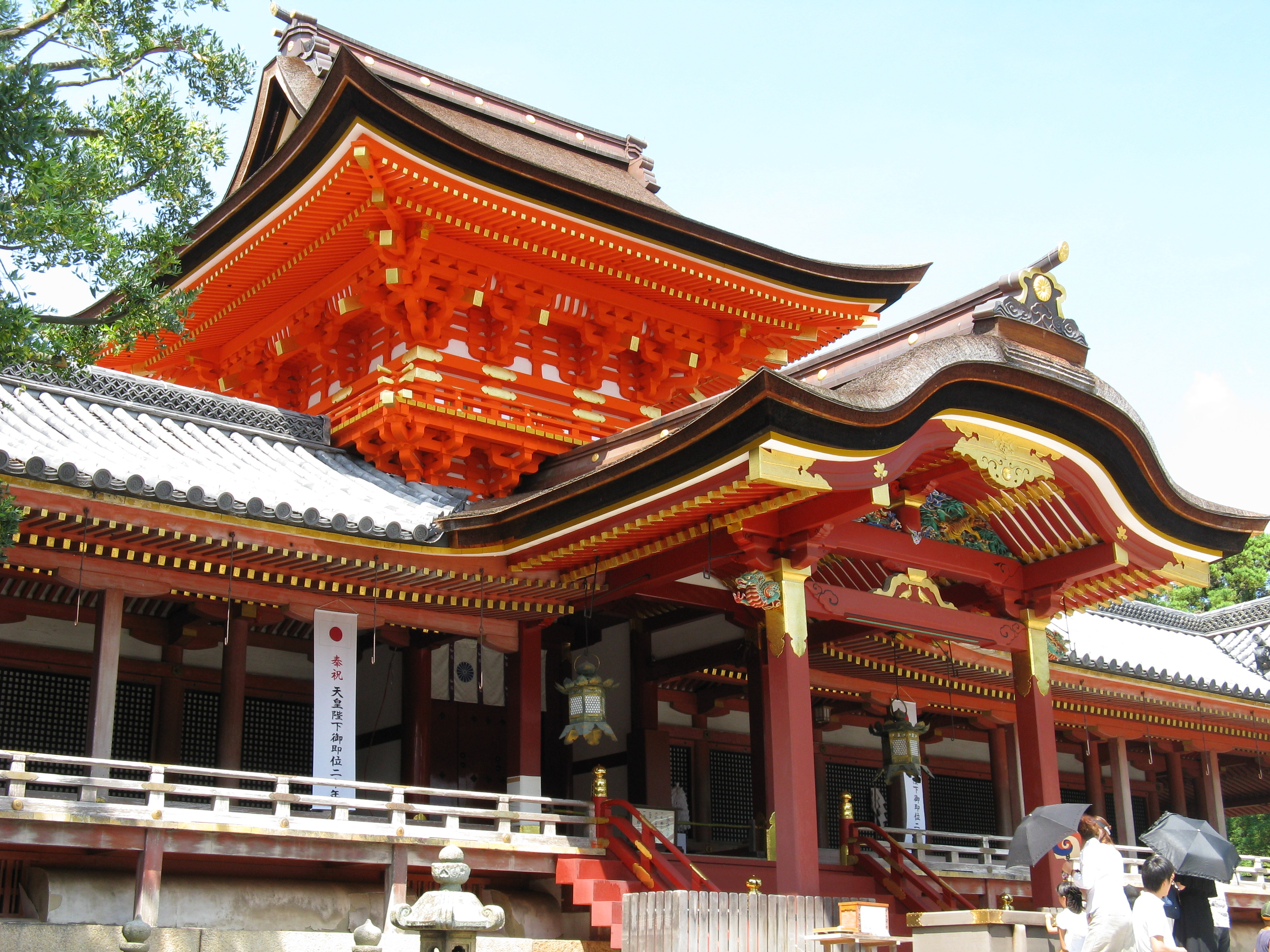
10.Yawata

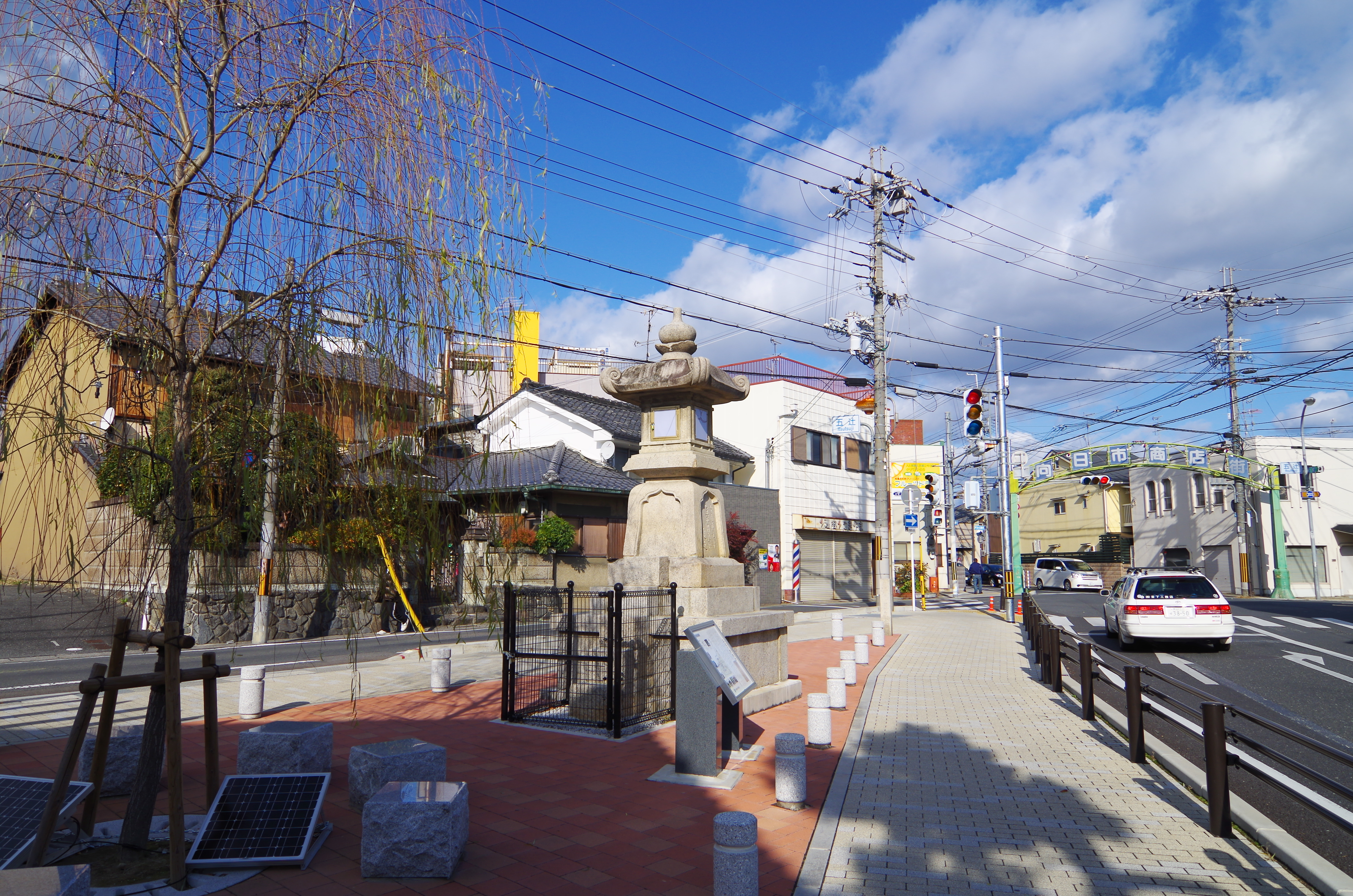
11.Mukō

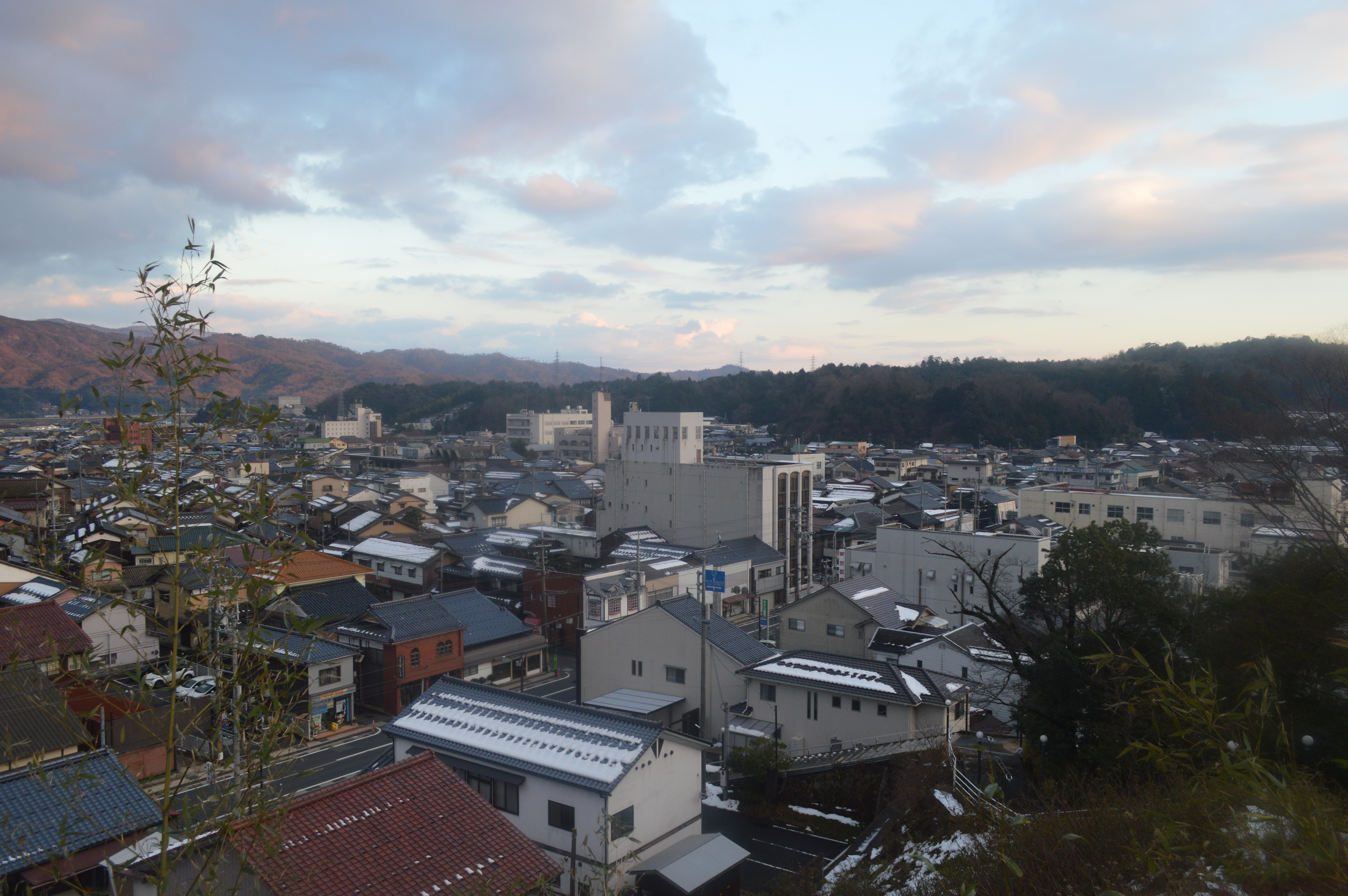
12Kyōtango

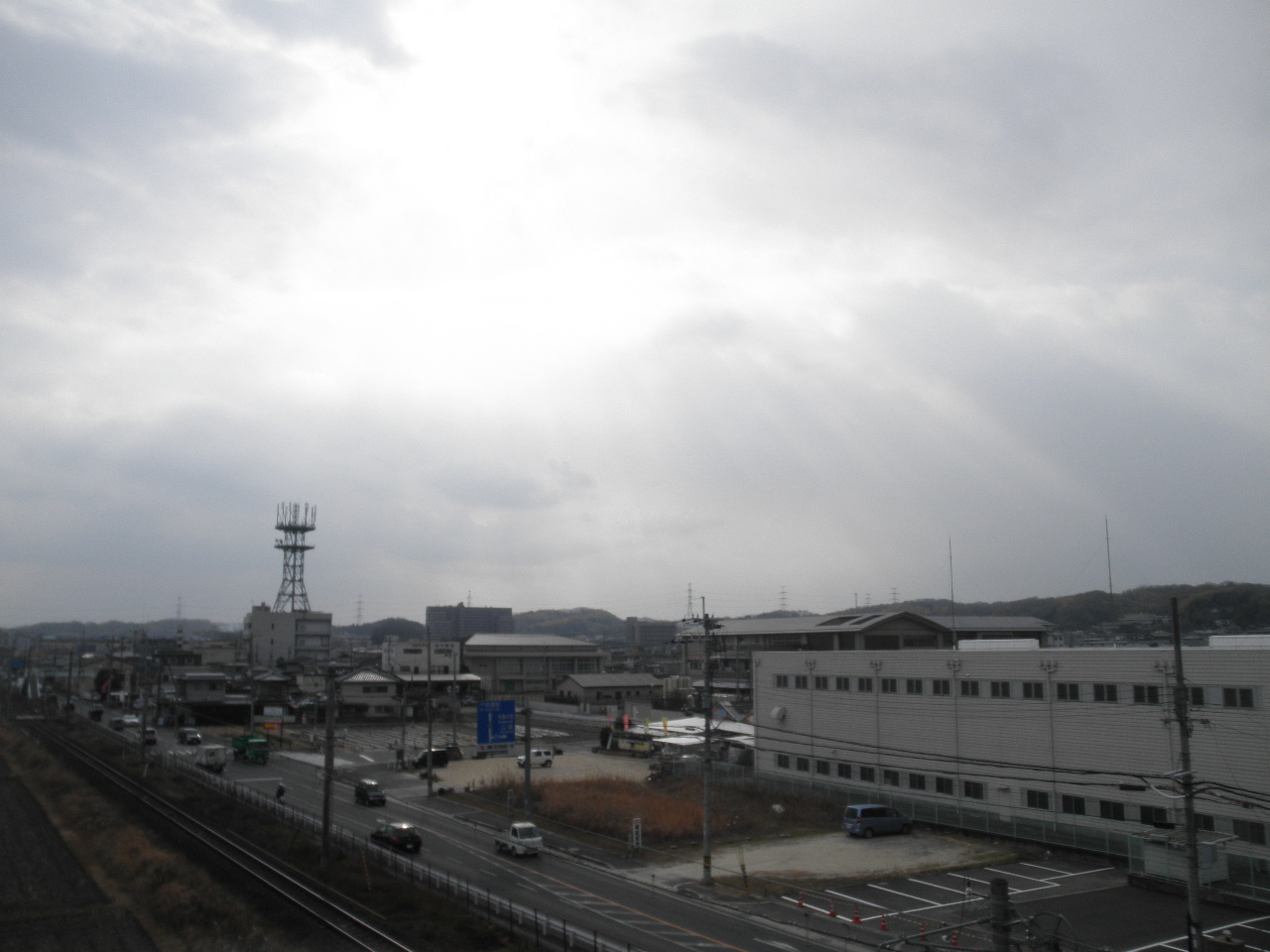
13.Seika

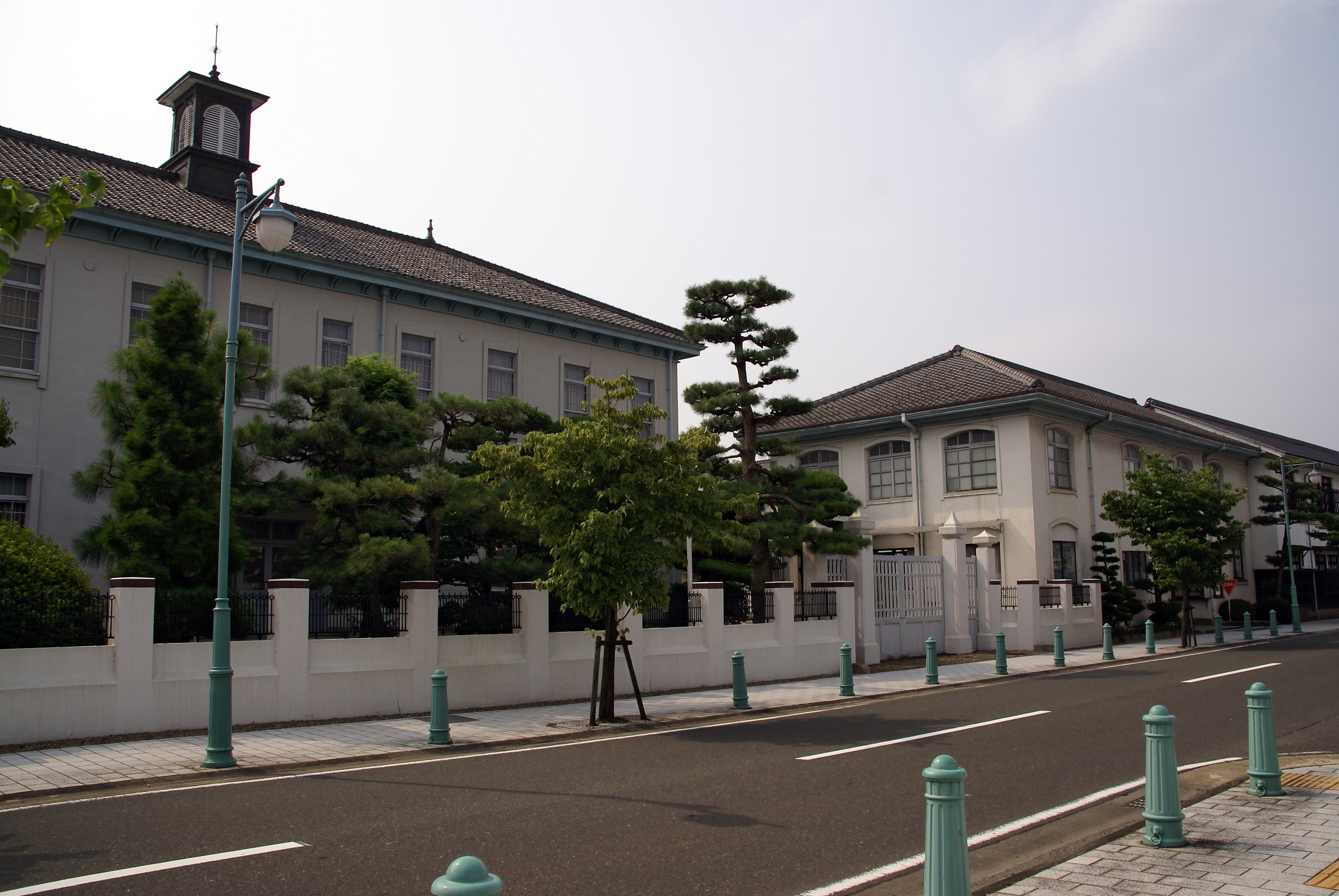
14.Ayabe

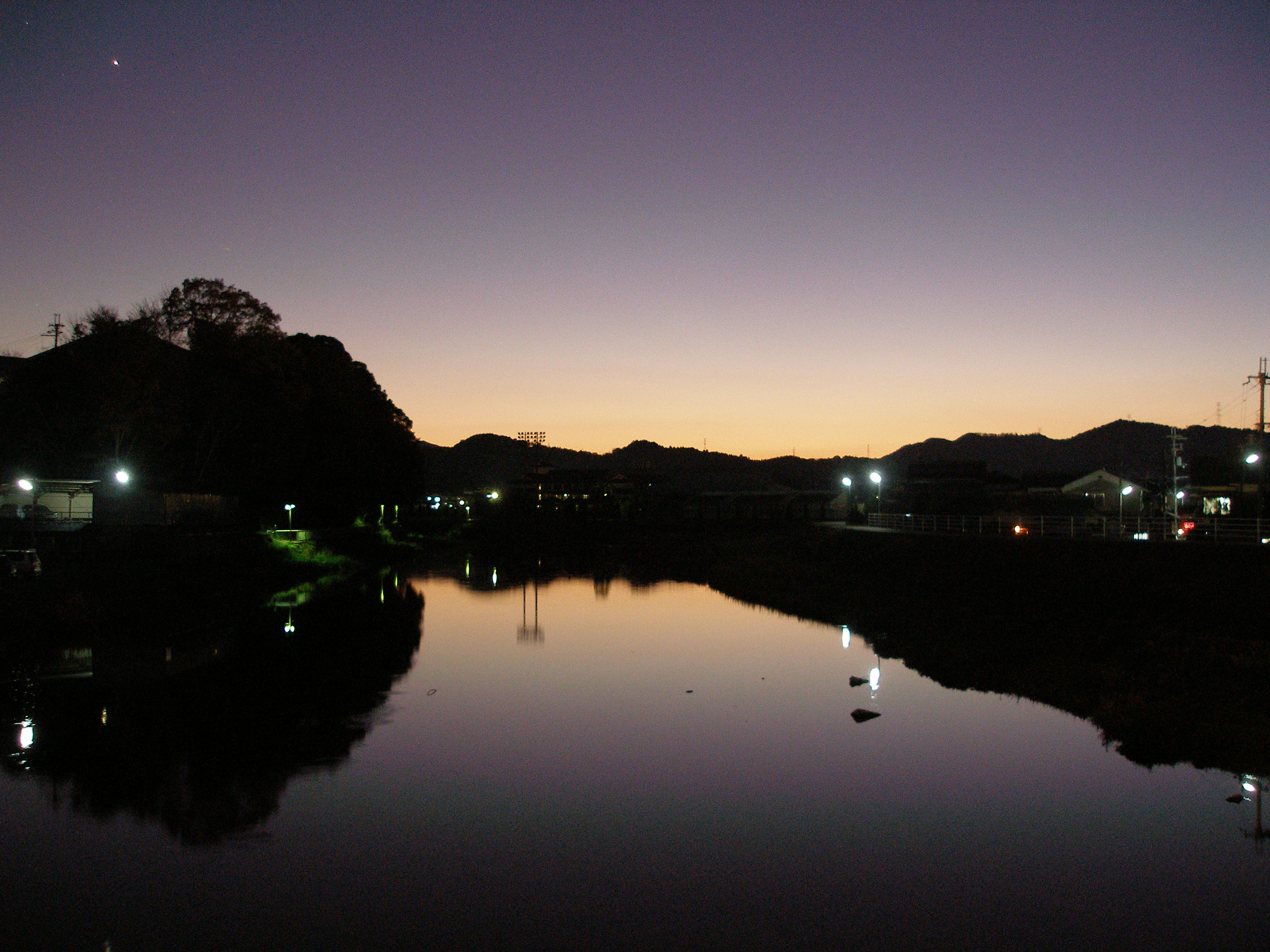
15.Nantan

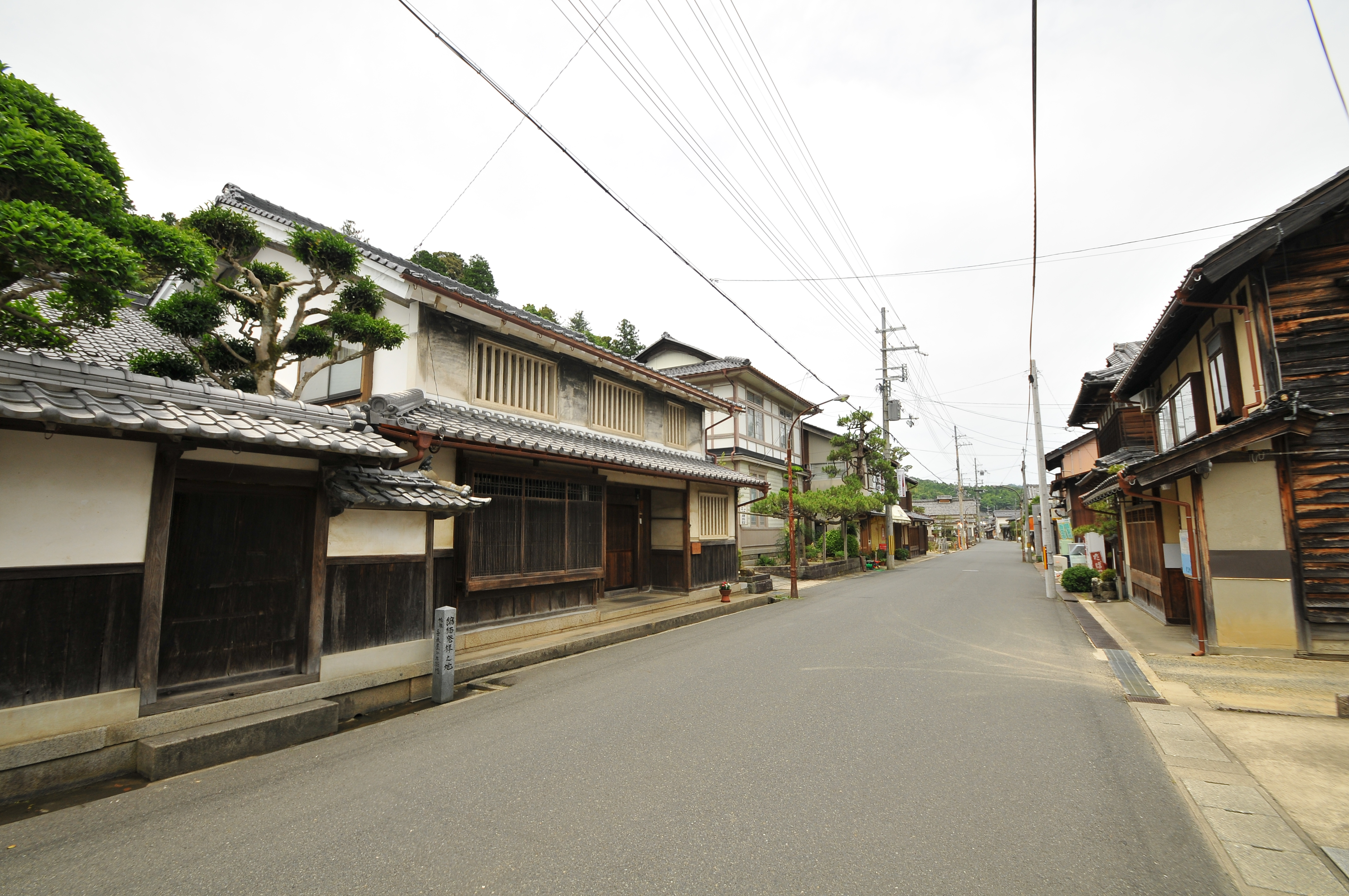
16.Yosano

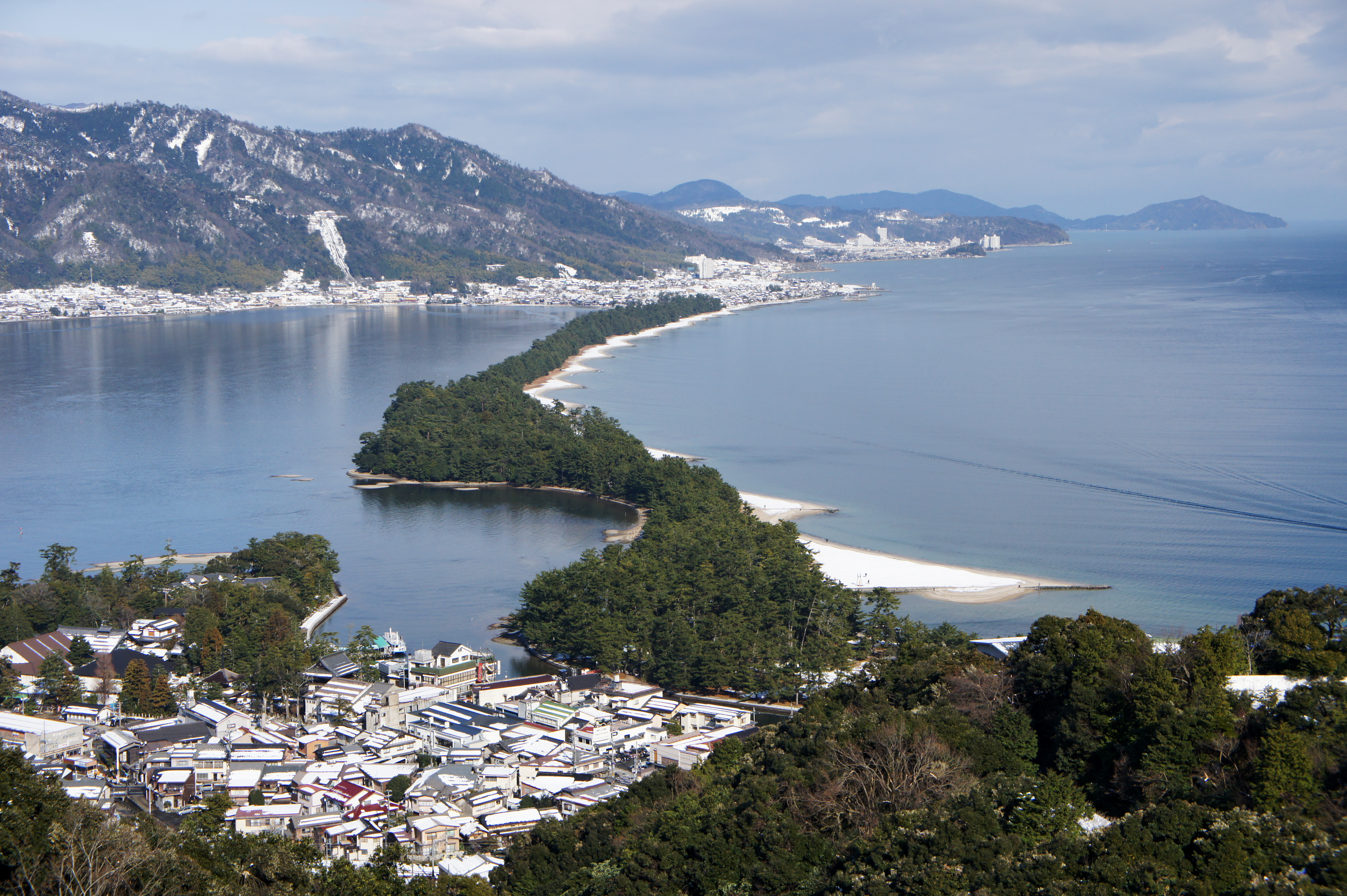
17.Miyazu

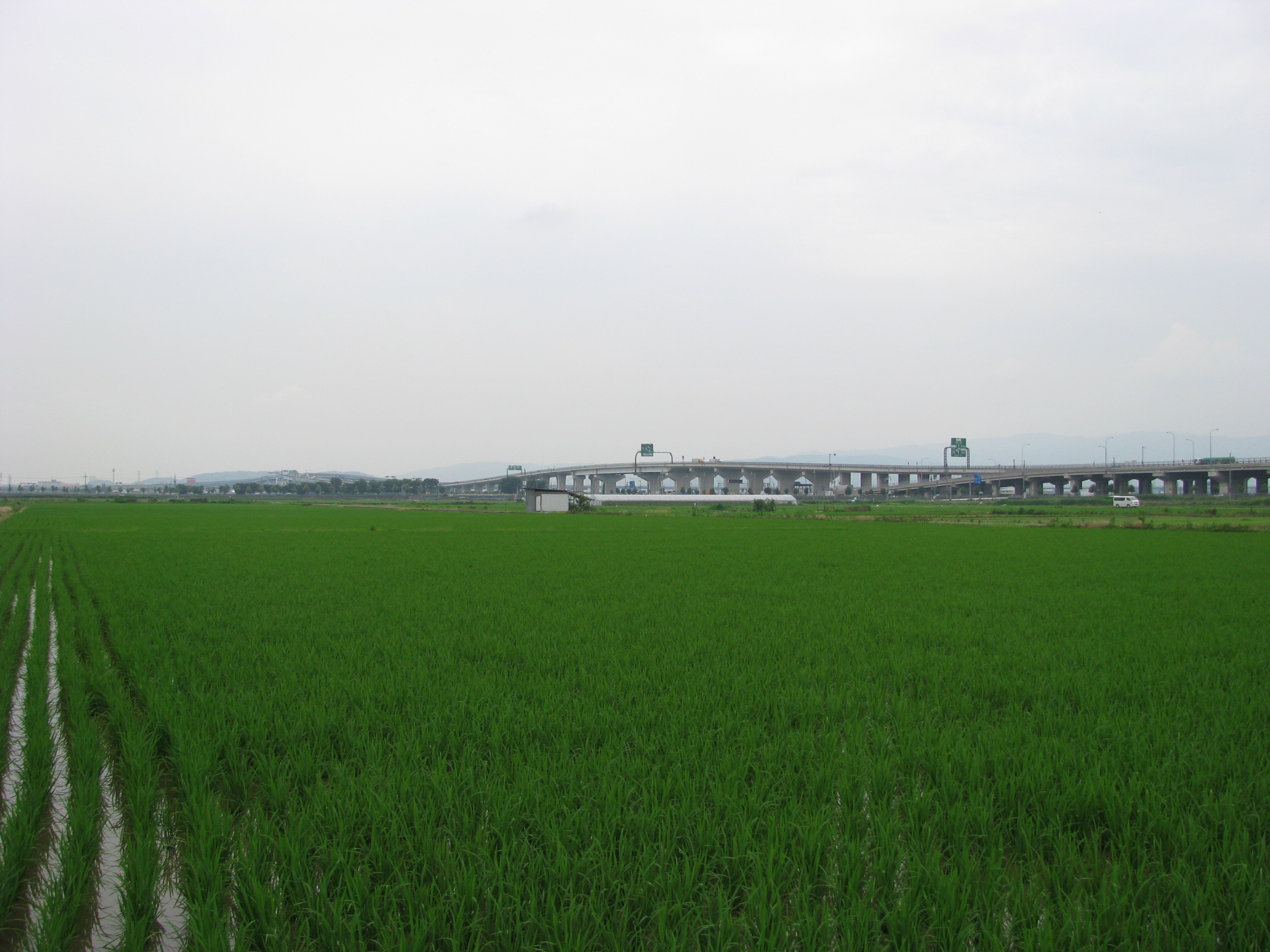
18.Kumiyama

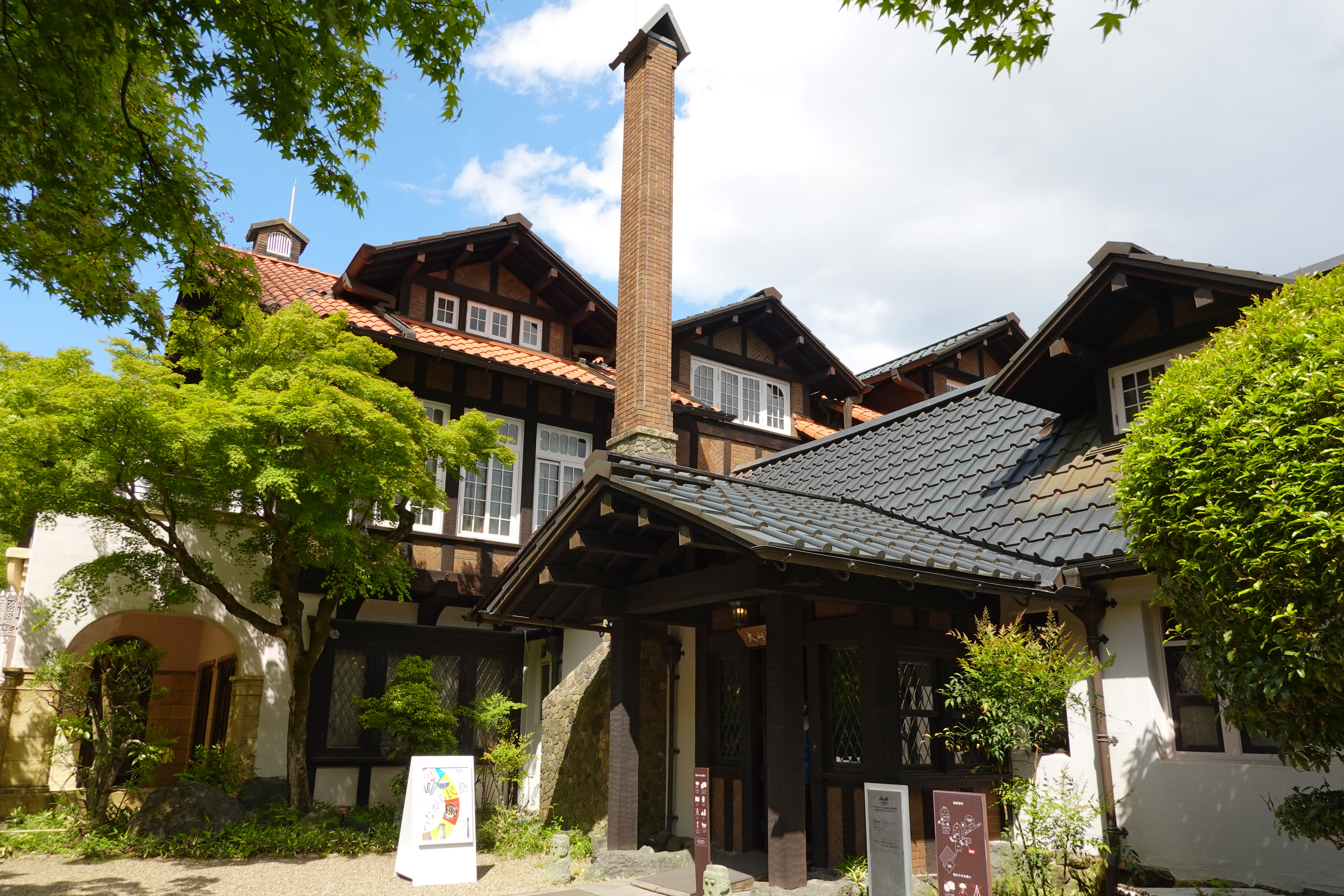
19.Ōyamazaki

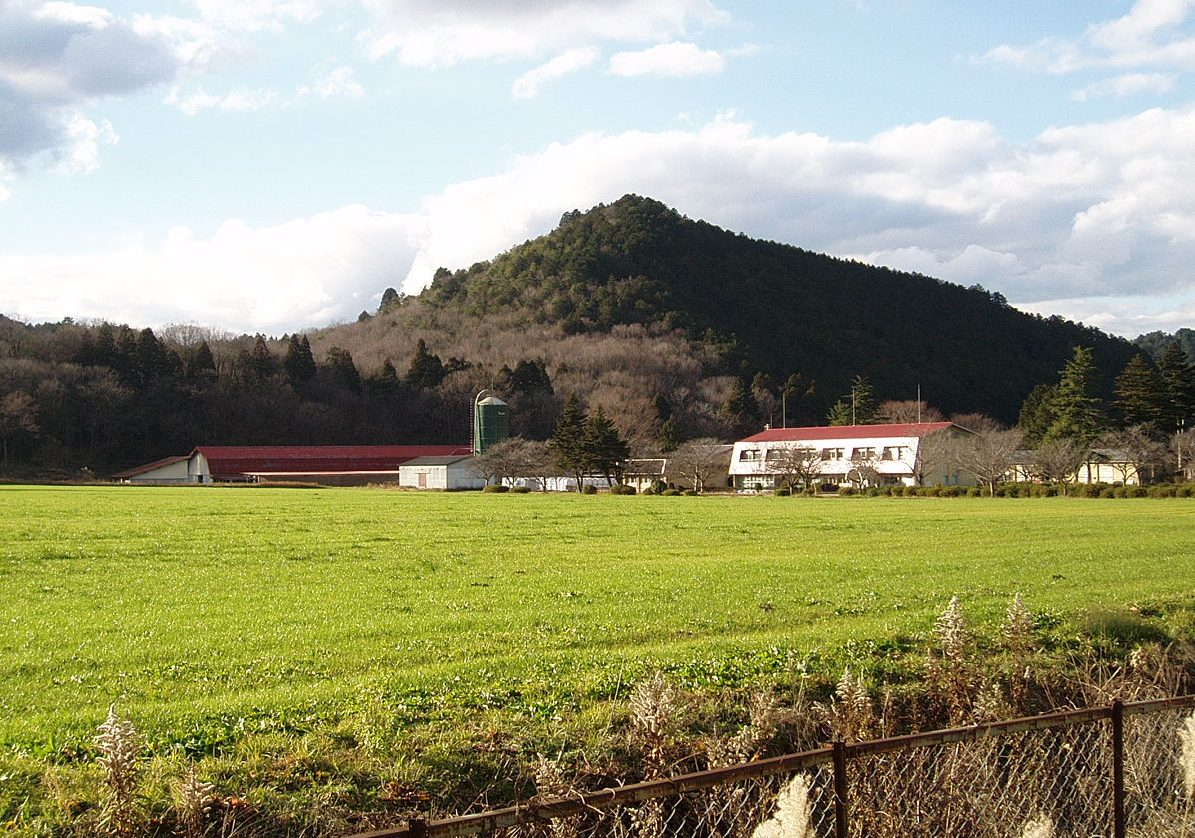
20.Kyōtamba

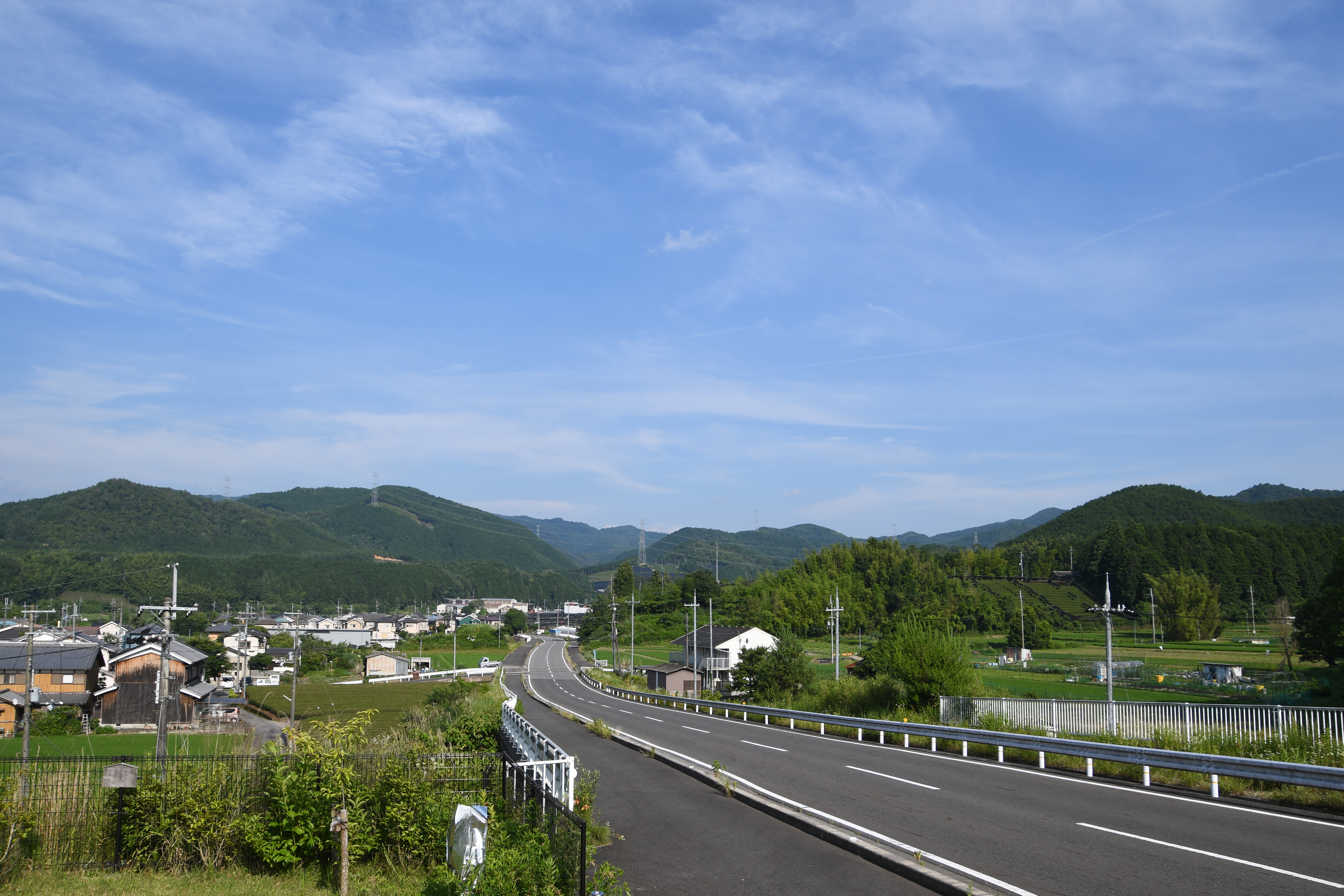
21.Ujitawara

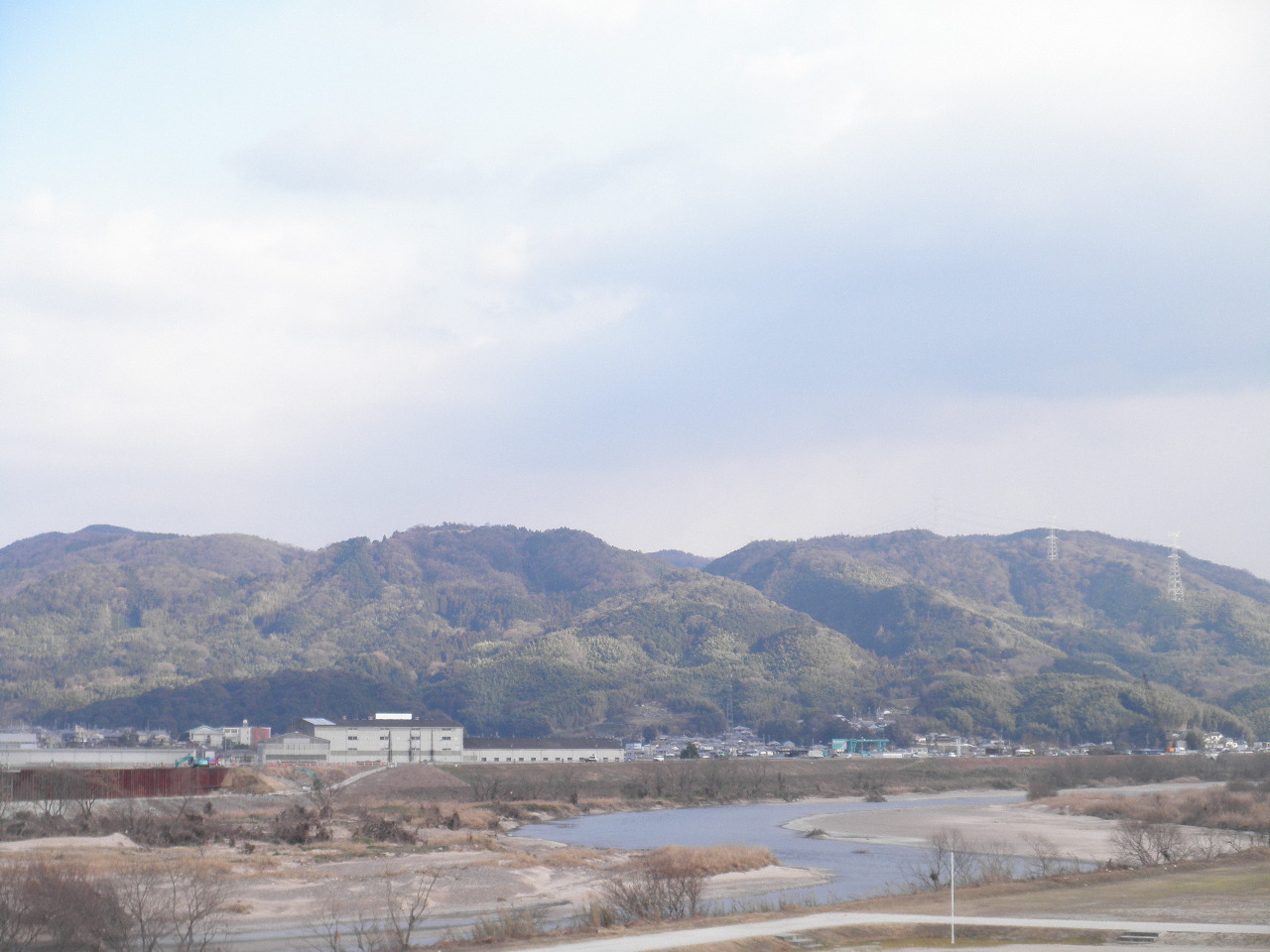
22.Ide
