= Wazuka =

Wazuka 和束町
- Town
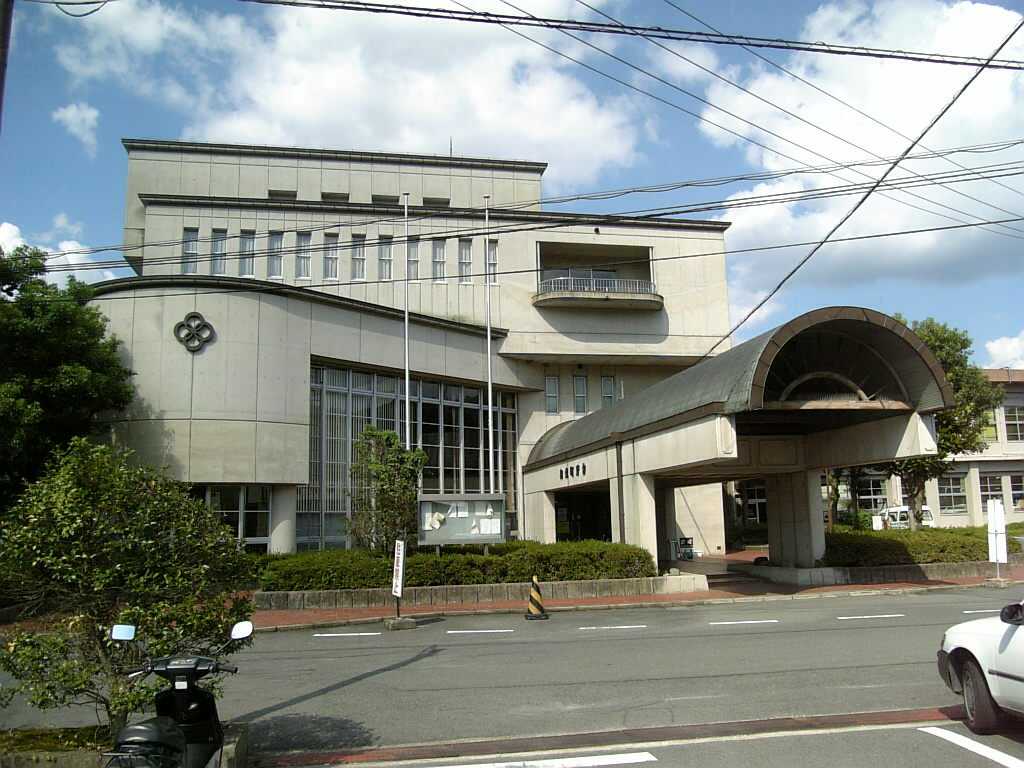
- Wazuka Town Hall

- Flag Seal
- Location of Wazuka in Kyoto Prefecture

- Location in Japan
- Coordinates: 34°47′44″N 135°54′18″E
- Country: Japan
- Region: Kansai
- Prefecture: Kyoto
- District: Sōraku

Area
  - Total: 64.93 km^{2} (25.07 sq mi)

Population (April 1, 2023)
  - Total: 3,478
  - Density: 53.57/km^{2} (138.7/sq mi)
- Time zone: UTC+09:00 (JST)
- City hall address: 14-2 Ikusui, Oaza Kamazuka, Wazuka-machi, Soraku-gun, Kyoto-fu 619-1295
- Website: Official website
- Symbols
- Bird: Green pheasant
- Flower: Camellia sinensis
- Tree: Cryptomeria

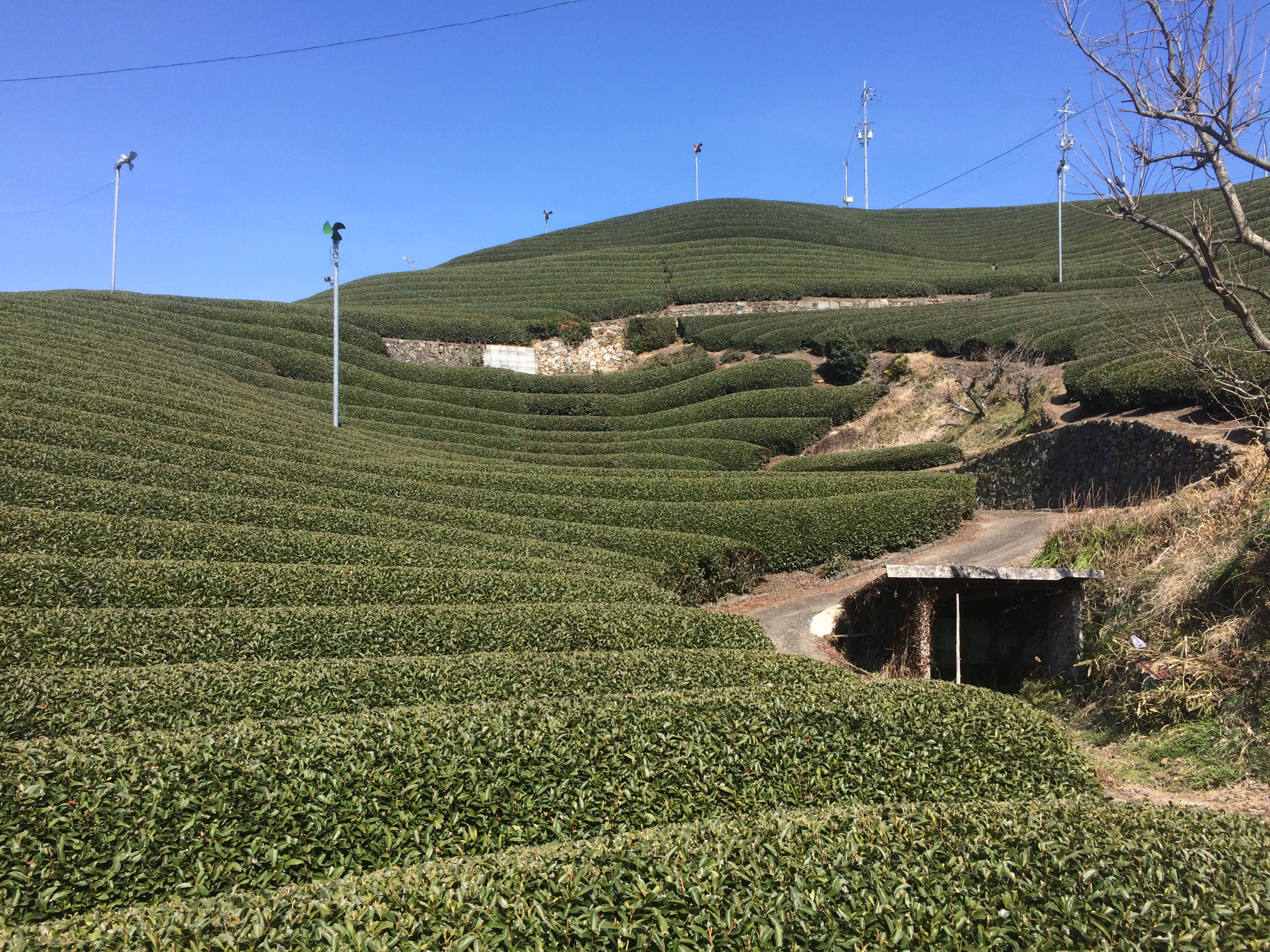
Tea plantations in Wazuka

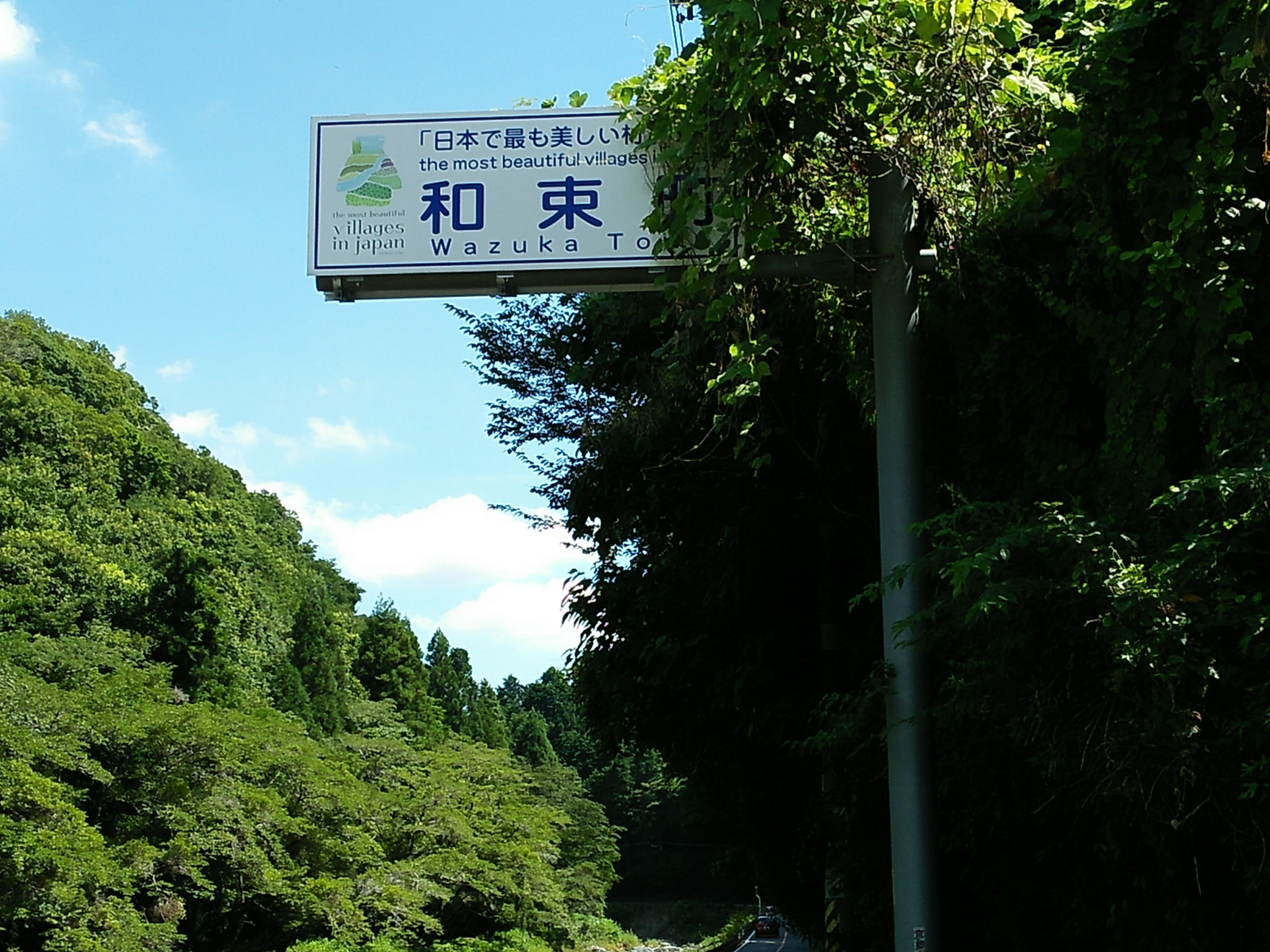
Wazuka Town Kyoto

Wazuka (和束町, Wazuka-chō) is a town located in Sōraku District, Kyoto Prefecture, Japan. As of 1 April 2023, the town has an estimated population of 3,571. and a population density of 54 persons per km^{2}. The total area is 64.93 km^{2}.

== Geography ==
Wazuka is located in the hills of far southeastern of Kyoto Prefecture.

=== Neighboring municipalities ===
Kyoto Prefecture

- Kizugawa
- Sōraku District (Kasagi・Minamiyamashiro)
- Tsuzuki District (Ide・Ujitawara)

Shiga Prefecture

- Kōka

=== Climate ===
Wazuka has a humid subtropical climate (Köppen Cfa) characterized by warm summers and cool winters with light to no snowfall. The average annual temperature in Wazuka is 13.7 °C. The average annual rainfall is 1439 mm with September as the wettest month. The temperatures are highest on average in August, at around 25.7 °C, and lowest in January, at around 2,1 °C.

== Demographics ==
Per Japanese census data, the population of Wazuka has declined in recent decades.

Historical population
Year	Pop.	±%
1940	6,186	—
1950	7,489	+21.1%
1960	6,889	−8.0%
1970	6,316	−8.3%
1980	6,290	−0.4%
1990	6,079	−3.4%
2000	5,457	−10.2%
2010	4,482	−17.9%
2020	3,478	−22.4%

== History ==
The area of Wazuka was part of ancient Yamashiro Province. During the Edo Period, the area was part of the holdings of the Imperial family. The villages of Nishiwazuka, Nakawazuka and Higashiwazuka were merged to form the town of Wazuka on December 15, 1954.

== Government ==
Wazuka has a mayor-council form of government with a directly elected mayor and a unicameral town council of ten members. Wazuka, collectively with the other municipalities of Sōraku District and the city of Kizugawa, contributes two members to the Kyoto Prefectural Assembly. In terms of national politics, the town is part of the Kyoto 6th district of the lower house of the Diet of Japan.

== Economy ==
Wazuka is a rural area, with an economy based on agriculture, with the area noted for its production of green tea. Wazuka is home to roughly 300 tea growing families. The area was selected in the Kamakura period (1192–1333) for tea production and has enjoyed an 800-year history as one of the main production areas of Uji tea. Today Uji tea comprises only about 4% of the tea produced in Japan, and Wazuka tea only half of that. Also a considerable crop of rice is produced among other agricultural products. The local community is in cooperation with NICE, a major volunteer program, and together hold a large annual work camp at the end of August lasting 2 weeks. The program is open to about 12 foreigners per year and an equal number of Japanese work campers.

In addition, Wazuka is home to Obubu Tea Farm, one of the biggest tea producers in the country. Obubu Tea farm offers interesting activities such as tea harvesting events, tea tours for tourists and professionals, visits to the tea fields and production facilities, tea tasting and production, in addition to mochi making and pottery classes and events.

Wazuka is also home to Blodge Lodge, a guesthouse established in September 2016 that offers accommodation and cultural experiences for visitors. Activities include walking tours, cooking classes, Japanese tea tastings, and Japanese tea ceremonies conducted in English.

=== Wazuka tea history ===
Kaijūsen-ji temple is often credited with bringing tea to Wazuka village. Shonin Jishin, a Zen Buddhist monk of the temple, was the first person to begin cultivation of tea there. He began cultivation on Mt. Jubu, where the practice began to spread to the village of Wazuka below. The original function of tea that was grown in Wazuka was grown for medicinal use for Zen Buddhist monks. The monks in the area used it for training at their temples.

The type of tea grown in Wazuka, Uji tea, was first introduced on to the world stage when Commodore Perry, head of the United States East Indian Squadron, influenced Japan to open up trade in the Edo Bay in 1853.

Later, the village of Wazuka itself, along with former villages Kamo-Mura and Koma-Mura, began to reach acclaim within Japan when it won a prize in a national tea exposition in Ueno Park, Tokyo in 1890.

== Education ==
Wazuka has one public elementary school and one public junior high school operated by the Sōraku Tōbu kōiki rengō. The town does not have a high school

== Transportation ==
=== Railways ===
Wazuka does not have any passenger railway service. The nearest train station is Kamo Station on the JR West Kansai Main Line.

=== Highways ===
- National Route 163

== Local attractions ==
- Asakasinnoryobo
- Kontaiji Temple
- Sakajiri Tomb
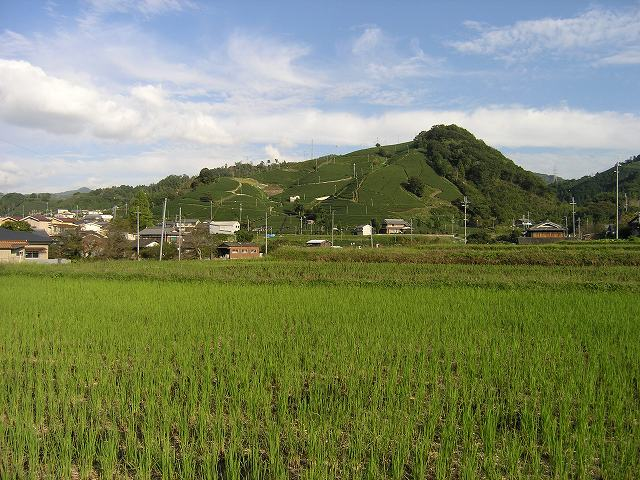
Farmland in Wazuka

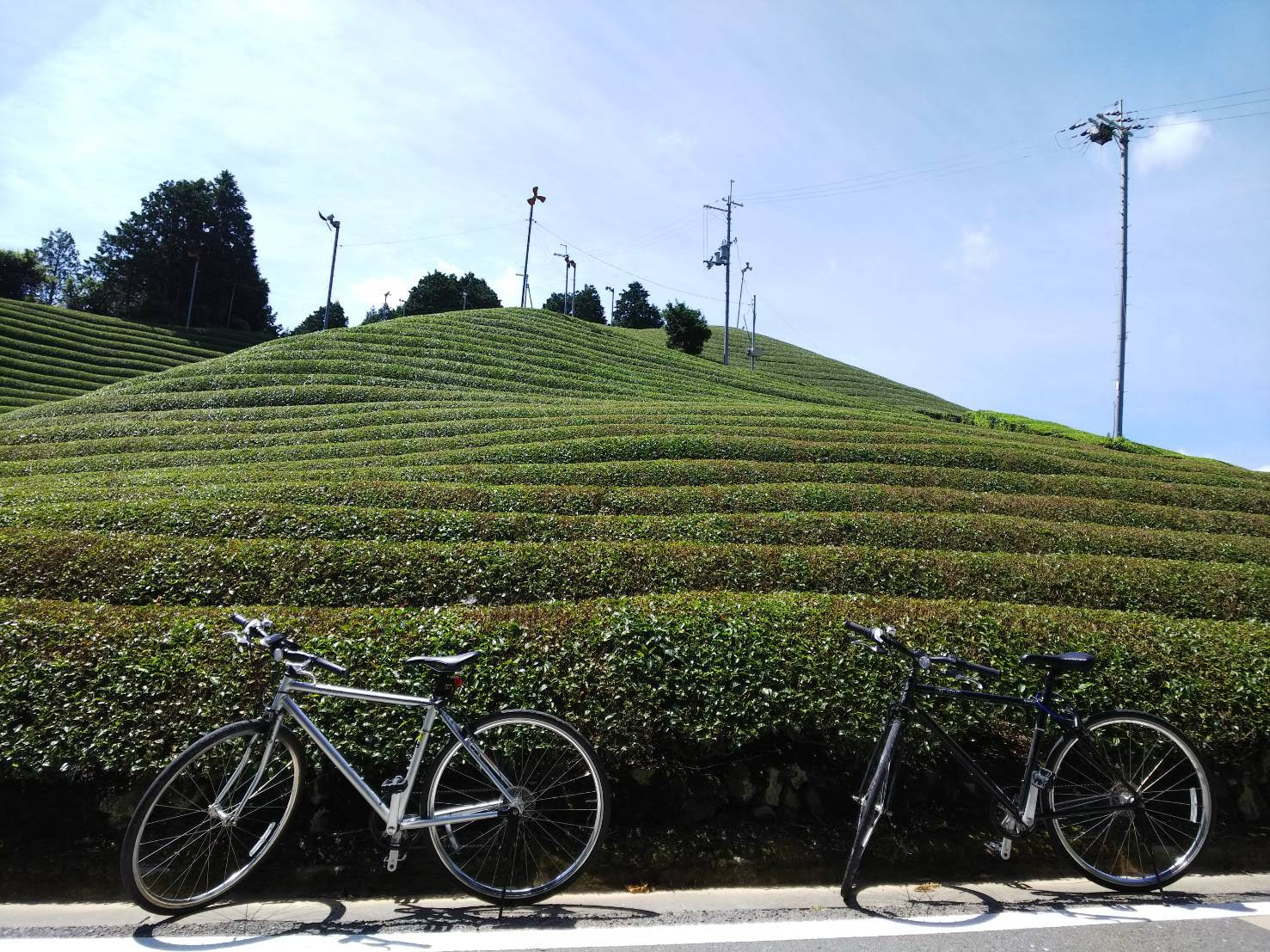
Cycling in Tea plantation in Wazuka, Kyoto

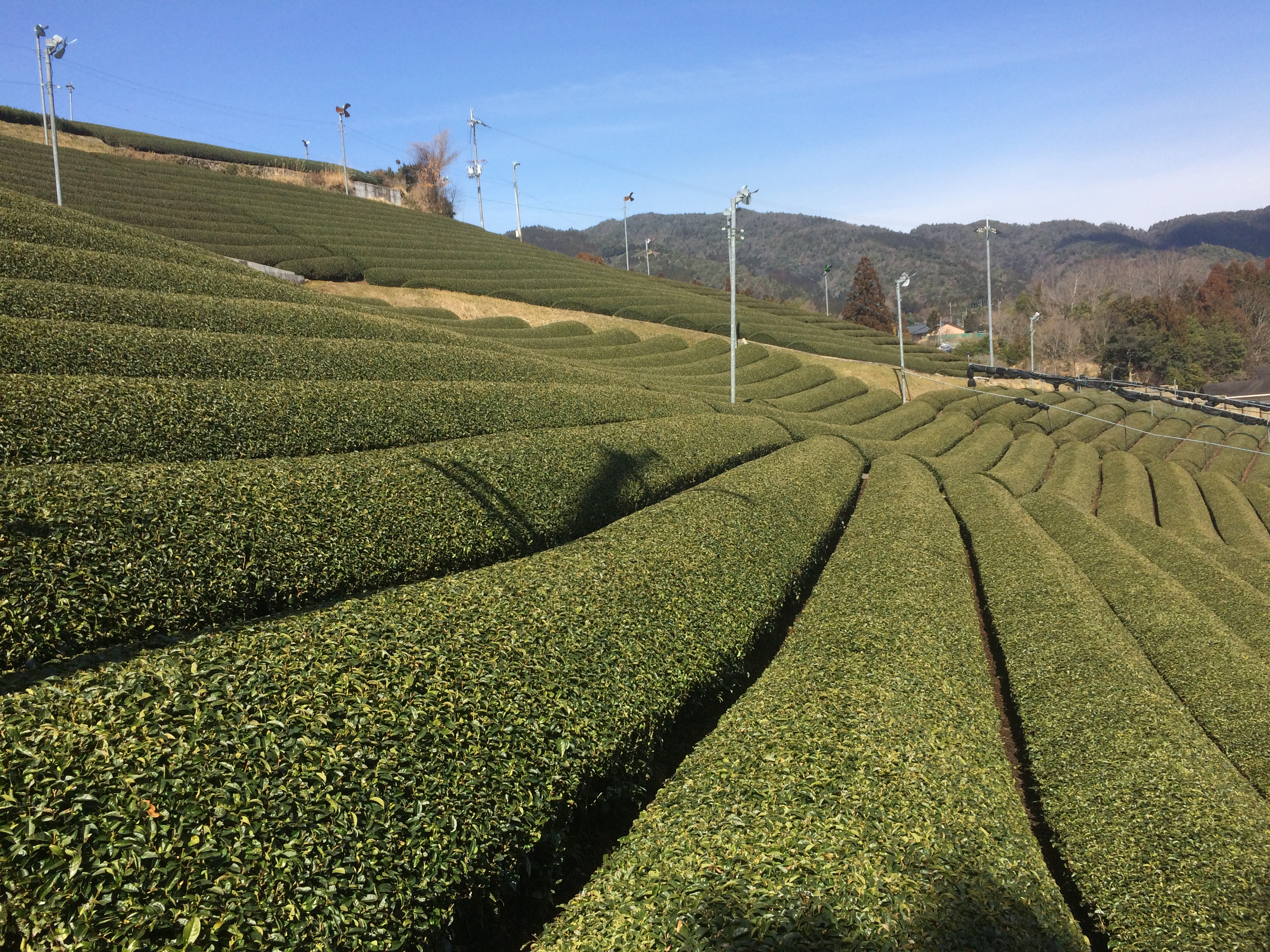
Scenery of the tea plantation in Wazuka Town

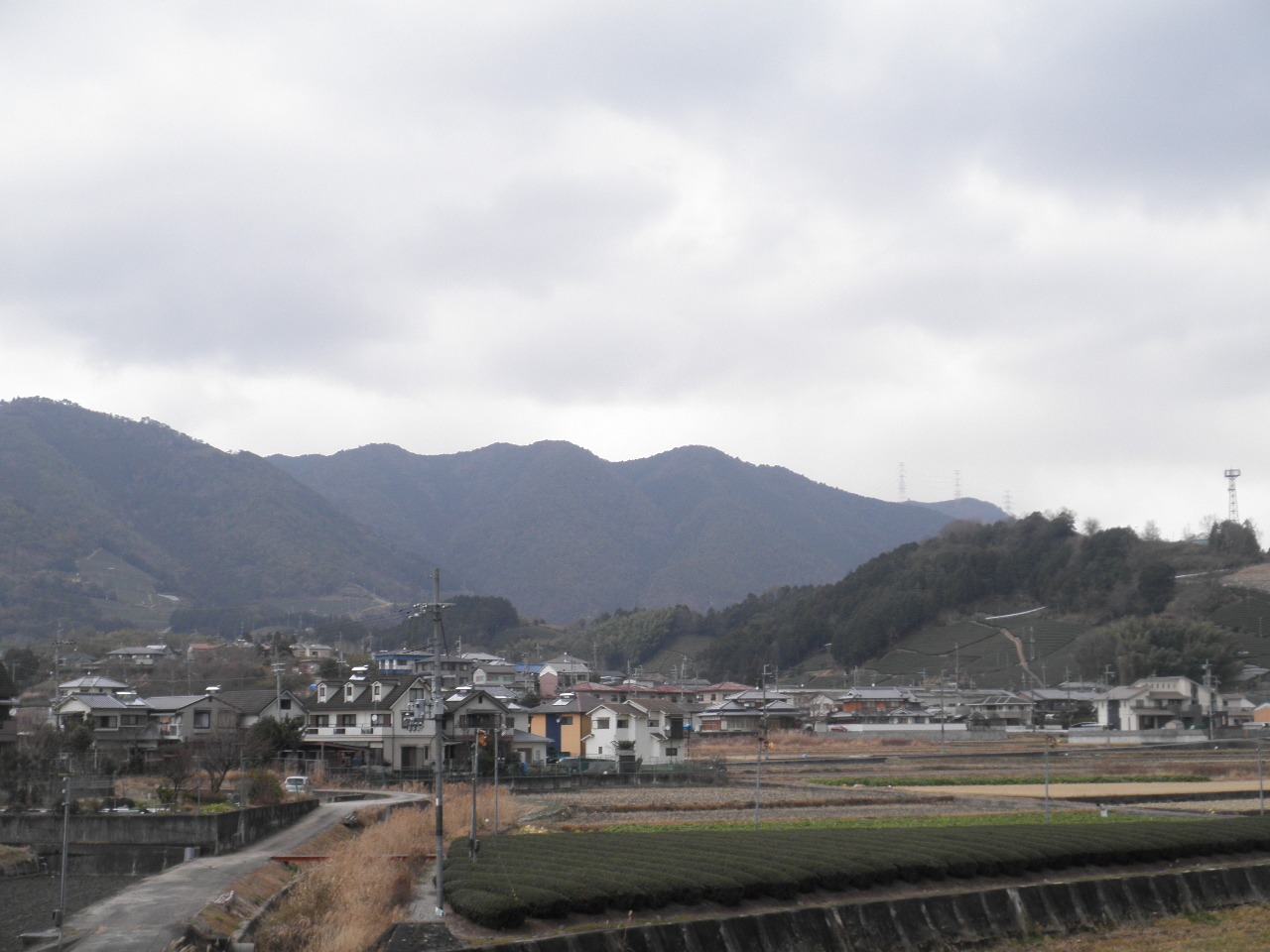
Wazukatown center area

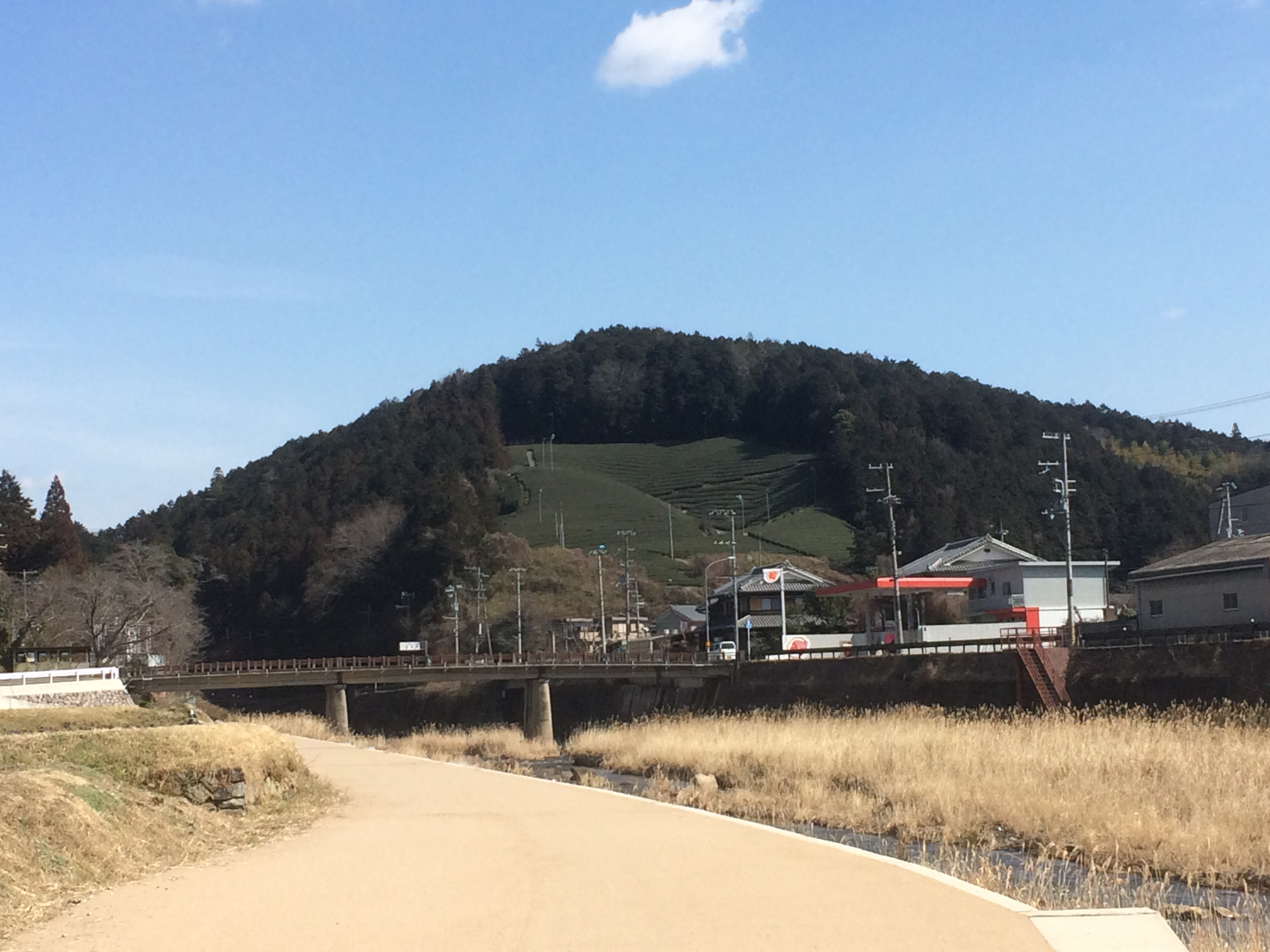
Syohoujisan mountain in Wazuka Town

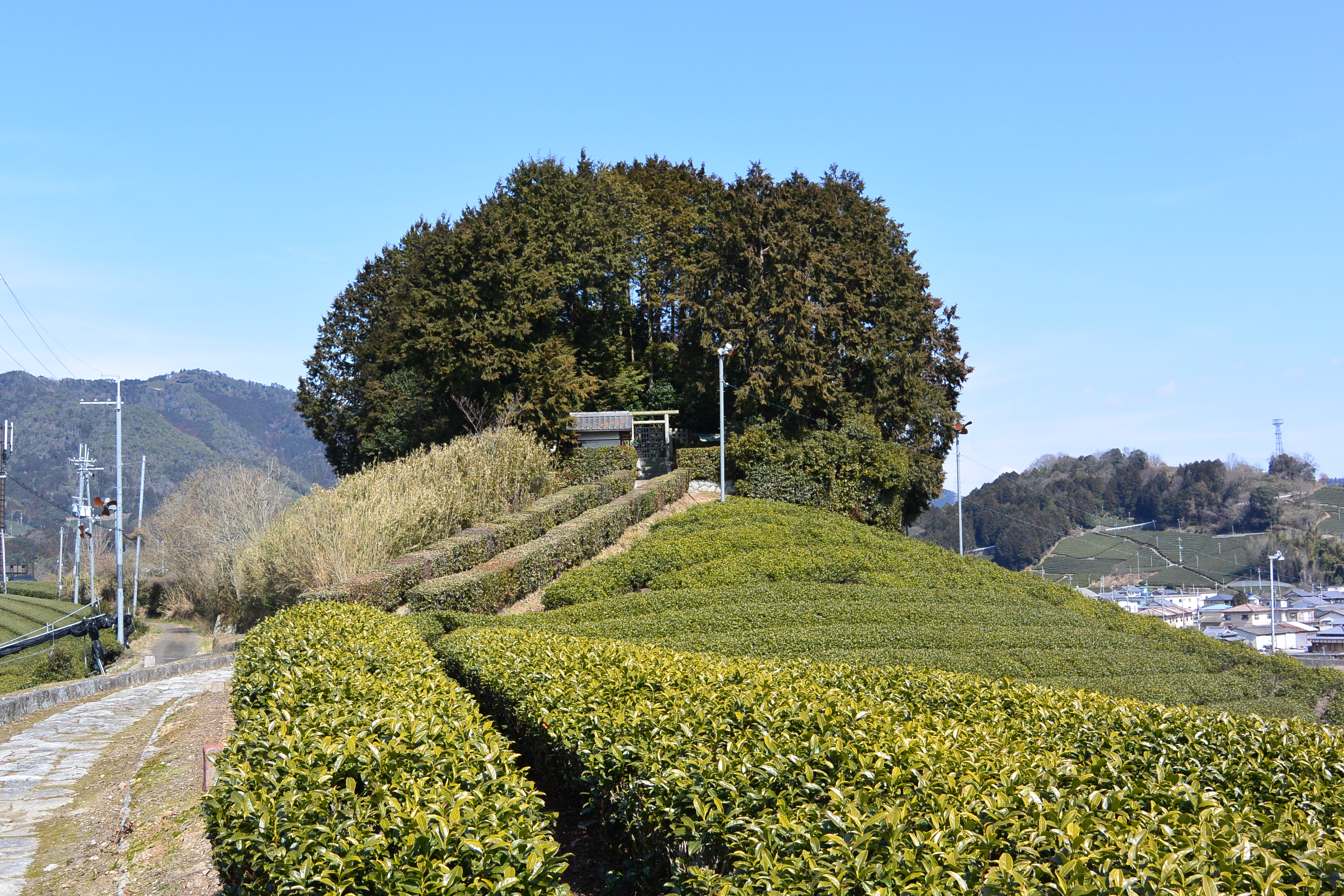
Asakasinnou tomb

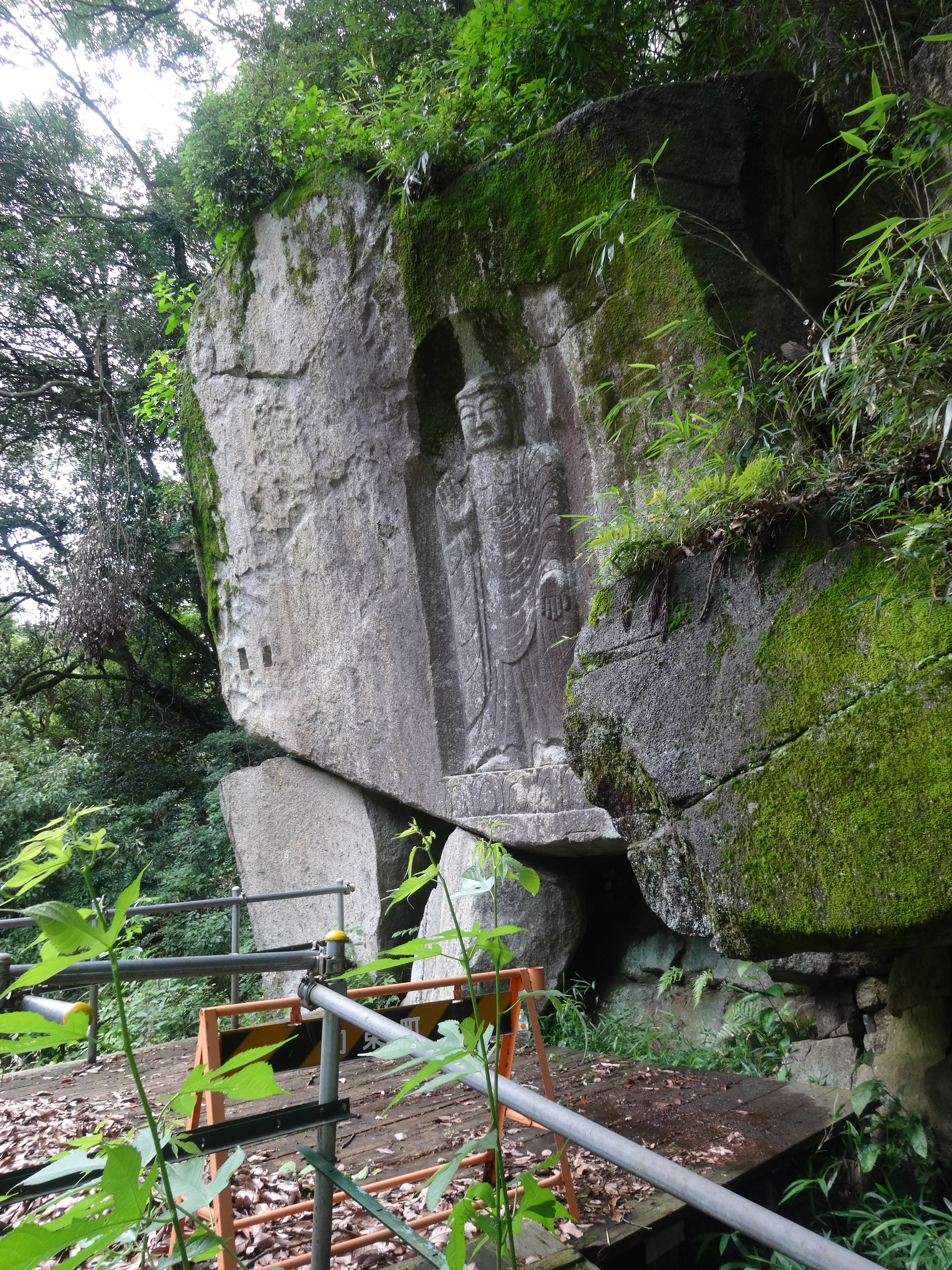
Wazuka Magaibutsu

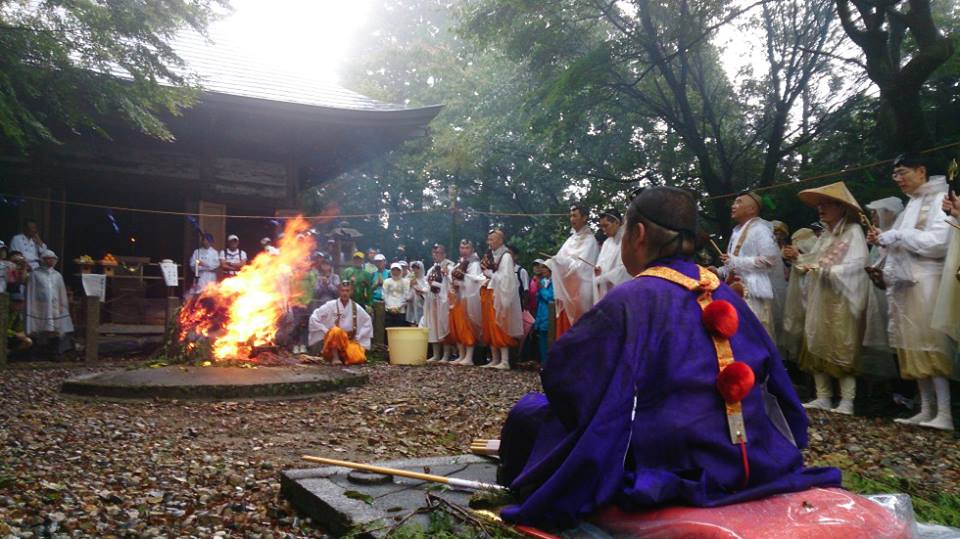
Kontaiji Temple Goma Houyou

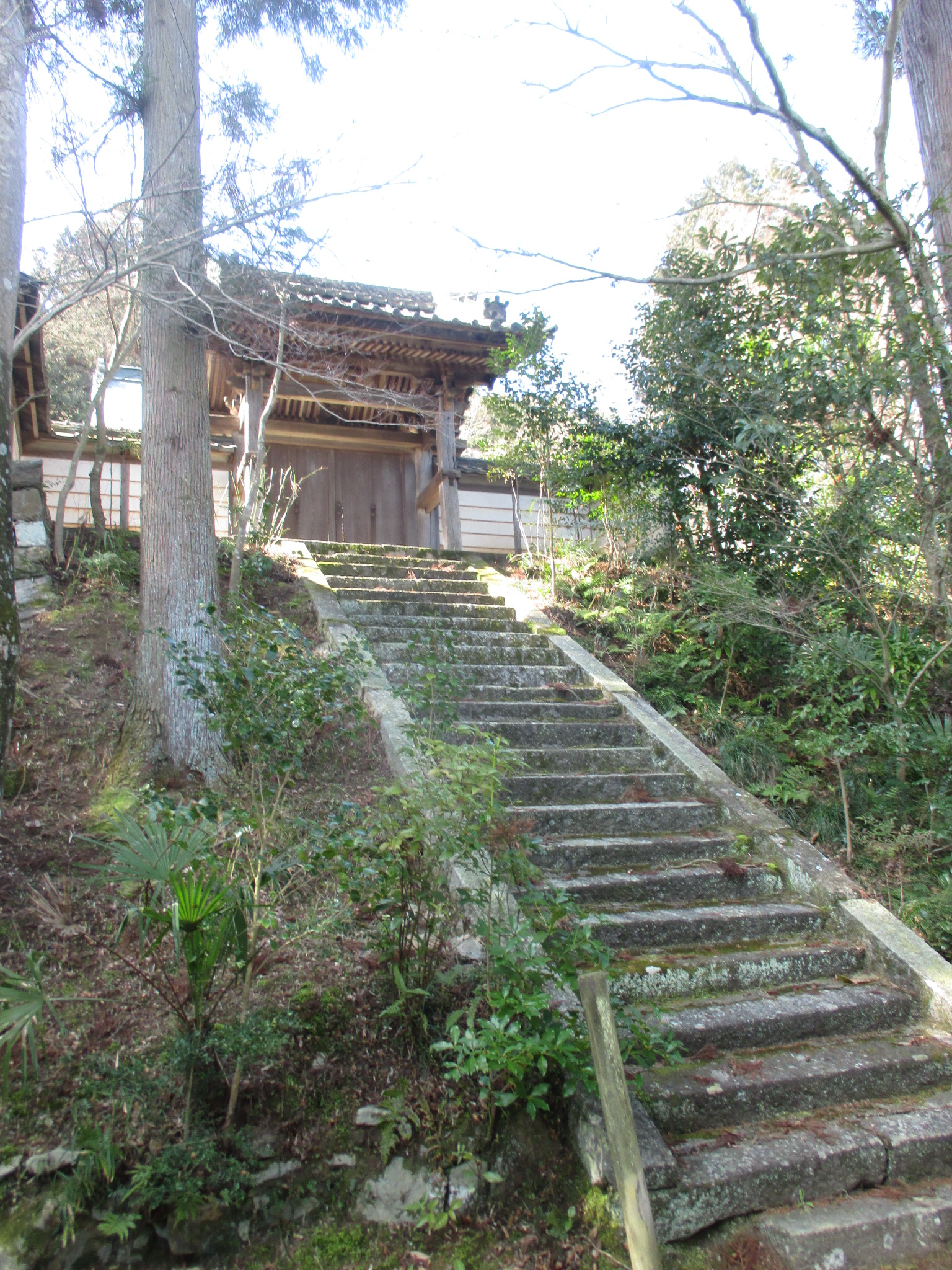
Syohoji temple

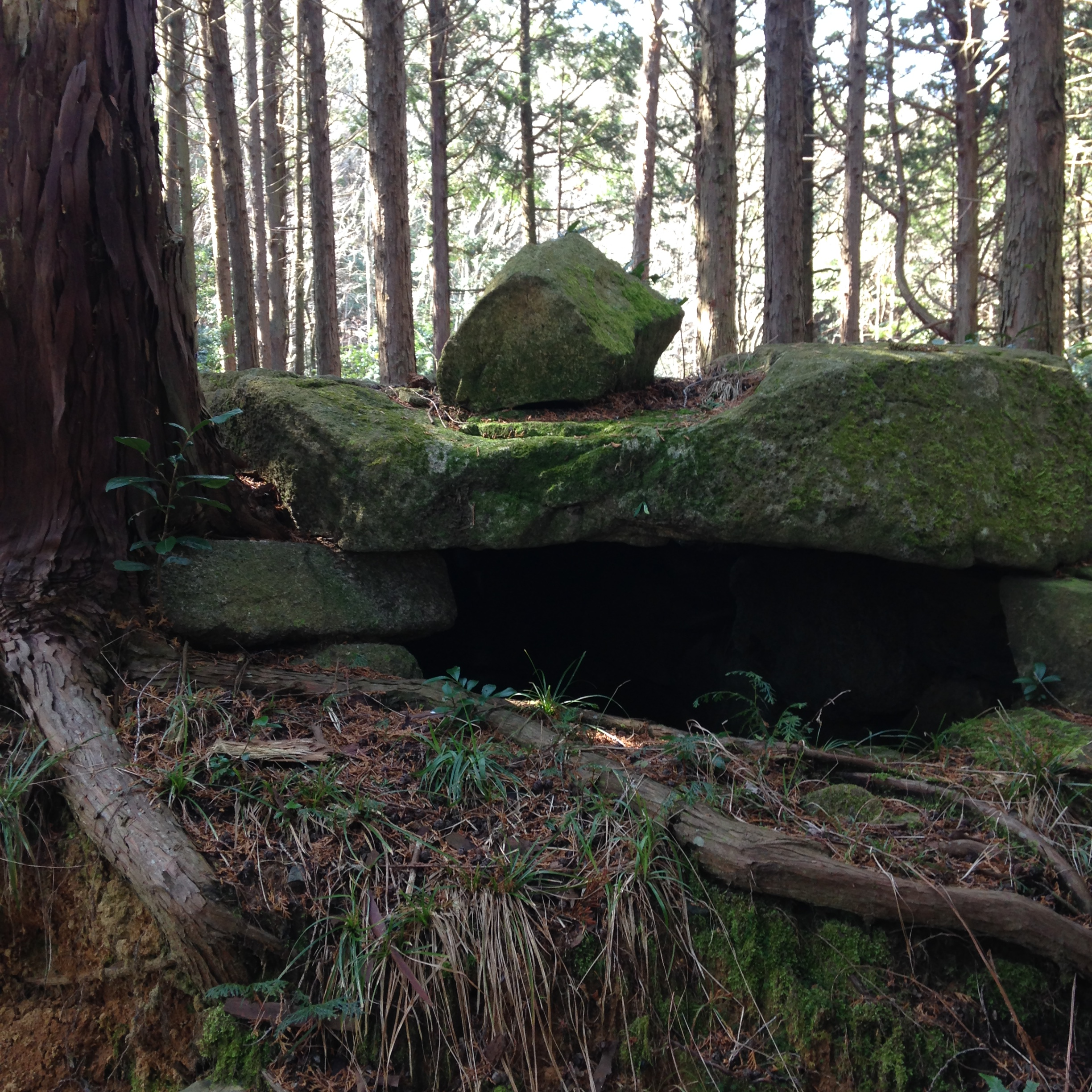
Sakajiri Tomb No1

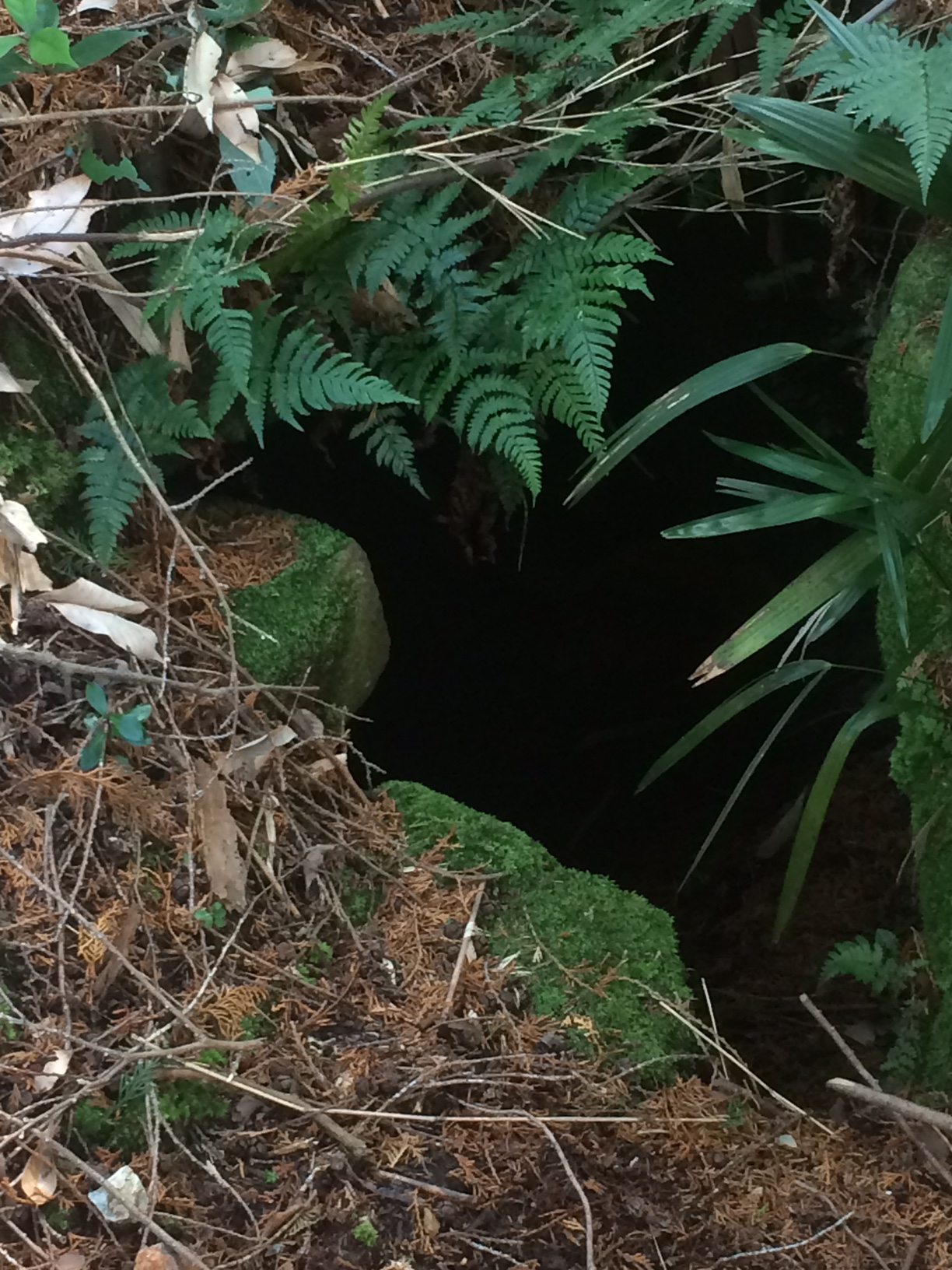
Sakajiri Tomb No2 entrance
