= Tsuzuki District =

District in Japan

Coordinates: 34.8465°N 135.874°E

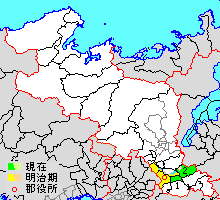
Location of Tsuzuki in Kyoto district

Tsuzuki (綴喜郡, Tsuzuki-gun) is a district located in Kyoto Prefecture, Japan.

As of 2003, the district has an estimated population of 19,200 and a density of 251.74 persons per km^{2}. The total area is 76.27 km^{2}.

== Towns and villages ==
- Ide
- Ujitawara
