= Ide, Kyoto =

Ide 井手町
- Town
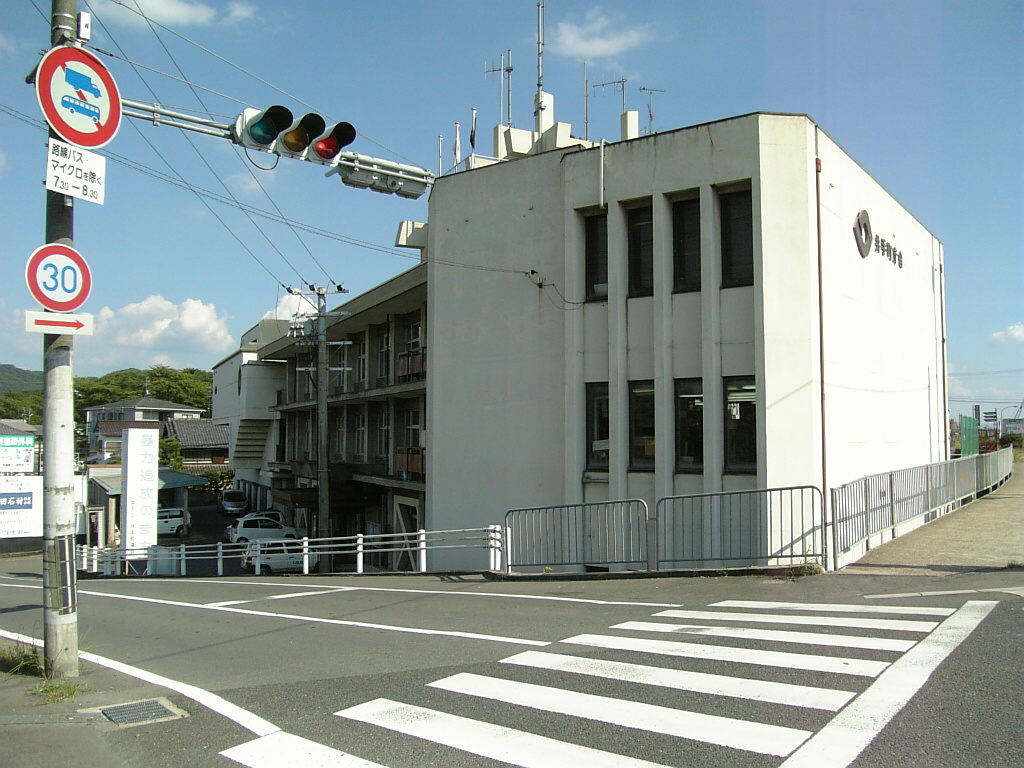
- Ide Town Hall

- Flag Emblem
- Interactive map of Ide
- Location in Japan
- Coordinates: 34°48′02″N 135°48′52″E
- Country: Japan
- Region: Kansai
- Prefecture: Kyoto
- District: Tsuzuki

Area
  - Total: 18.04 km^{2} (6.97 sq mi)

Population (September 1, 2022)
  - Total: 7,163
  - Density: 397.1/km^{2} (1,028/sq mi)
- Time zone: UTC+09:00 (JST)
- City hall address: 8, Ide Higashi Takatsuki, Ide-cho, Tsuzuki-gun, Kyoto-fu 610-0302
- Website: Official website
- Symbols
- Flower: Kerria japonica
- Tree: Chamaecyparis obtusa

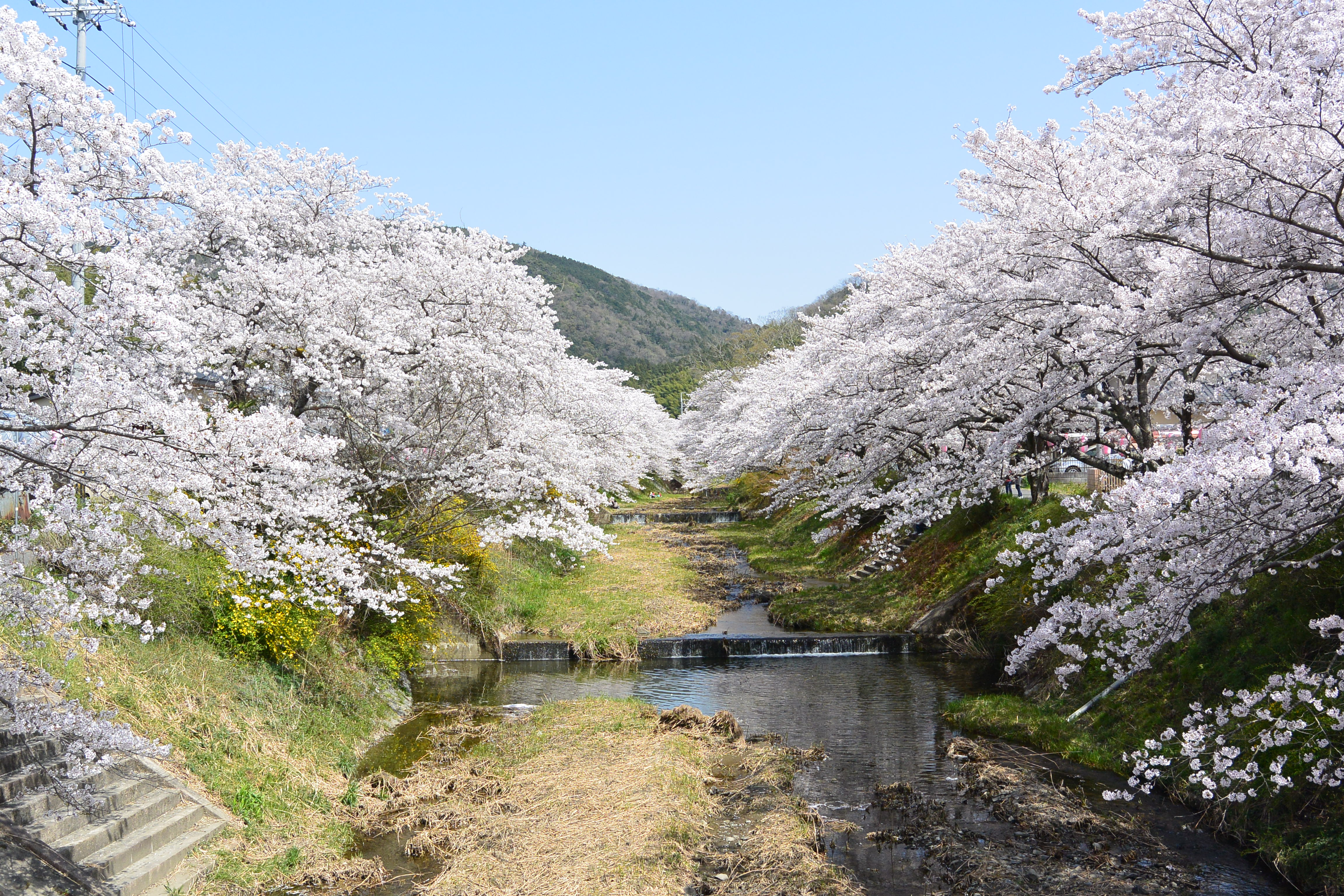
Tamagawa River at Sakura in Ide

Ide (井手町, Ide-chō) is a town located in Tsuzuki District, Kyoto Prefecture, Japan. As of September 1, 2022 the town had an estimated population of 7,163. The total area of the town is 18.04 square kilometres (6.97 sq mi).

== Geography ==
Ide is located in southeastern Kyoto Prefecture. The Tamagawa River, a tributary of the Kizu River, runs through the town from east to west, and in spring it is crowded with people viewing cherry blossoms. The town is divided into the Taga, Ide, and Ario areas. Approximately 70% of the town area is forest. In the rural landscape, there are historical sites such as the ruins of Ide-ji temple and the remains of the Ishibashi Tile Kiln, which was used to fire the roof tiles of Daian-ji, one of the seven great temples in Heijō-kyō.

=== Neighboring municipalities ===
Kyoto Prefecture

- Jōyō
- Kyōtanabe
- Kizugawa
- Kuse District (Kumiyama)
- Sōraku District (Wazuka)
- Tsuzuki District (Ujitawara)

=== Climate ===
Ide has a humid subtropical climate (Köppen Cfa) characterized by warm summers and cool winters with light to no snowfall. The average annual temperature in Ujitawara is 13.6 °C. The average annual rainfall is 1439 mm with September as the wettest month. The temperatures are highest on average in August, at around 25.7 °C, and lowest in January, at around 2.0 °C.

== Demographics ==
Per Japanese census data, the population of Ide has declined in recent decades.

Historical population
Year	Pop.	±%
1940	6,421	—
1950	7,498	+16.8%
1960	7,633	+1.8%
1970	8,560	+12.1%
1980	9,258	+8.2%
1990	9,234	−0.3%
2000	9,102	−1.4%
2010	8,447	−7.2%
2020	7,406	−12.3%

== History ==
The area of Ide was part of ancient Yamashiro Province. There are numerous burial mounds from the Kofun period within the town borders. During the Nara period, Tachibana no Moroe, an influential aristocrat, built a villa and a temple (Ide-ji) in this area. The region is frequently mentioned in poetry of the Heian period During the Edo Period, the area was part of the direct holdings of the Tokugawa shogunate. The village of Ide was established on April 1, 1889 with the creation of the modern municipalities system, and was raised to town status on January 1, 1927. Massive flooding on August 15, 1953 resulted in 109 fatalities in the town. Ide annexed the neighboring village of Taga on April 1, 1958.

== Government ==
Ide has a mayor-council form of government with a directly elected mayor and a unicameral village council of 10 members. Ide, collectively with the other municipalities of Tsuzuki District and the city of Kyōtamba, contributes two members to the Kyoto Prefectural Assembly. In terms of national politics, the village is part of the Kyoto 6th district of the lower house of the Diet of Japan.

== Economy ==
Ide is a rural area, with an economy based on agriculture and forestry.

== Education ==
Ide has two public elementary schools and one public junior high school operated by town government. The town does not have a high school

== Transportation ==
=== Railway ===
JR West - Nara Line

- Yamashiro-Taga - Tamamizu

=== Highways ===
- National Route 24
- National Route 307

== Local attractions ==
- Grave of Ono no Komachi

== Notable people from Ide ==
- Manabu Miyazaki, writer
