= Ujitawara =

Ujitawara 宇治田原町
- Town
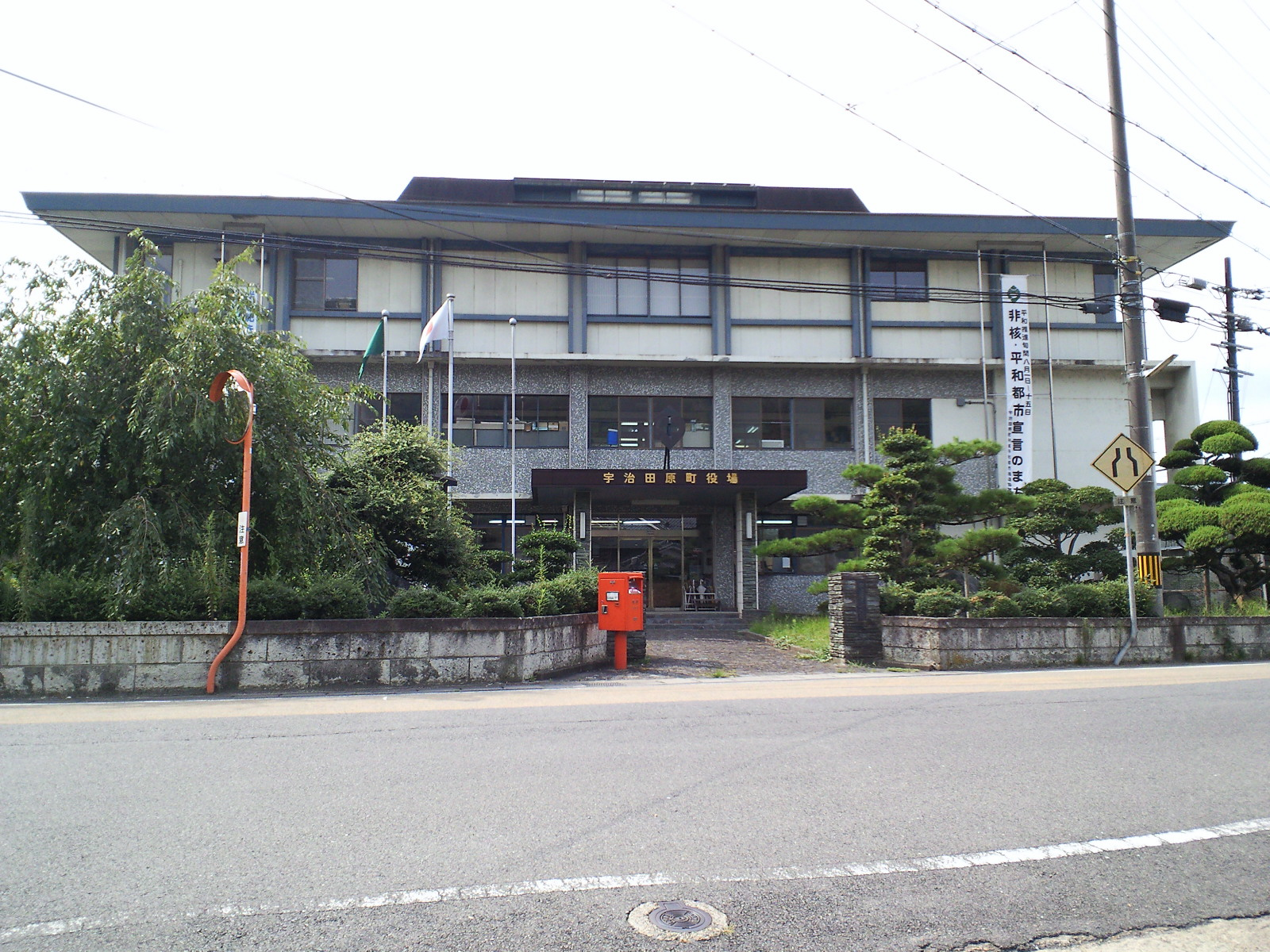
- Ujitawara Town Hall

- Flag Seal
- Location of Ujitawara in Kyoto Prefecture

- Location in Japan
- Coordinates: 34°50′41″N 135°52′05″E
- Country: Japan
- Region: Kansai
- Prefecture: Kyoto
- District: Tsuzuki

Area
  - Total: 58.16 km^{2} (22.46 sq mi)

Population (September 1, 2023)
  - Total: 8,911
  - Estimate (September 1, 2022): 8,845
  - Density: 153.2/km^{2} (396.8/sq mi)
- Time zone: UTC+09:00 (JST)
- City hall address: 18-1 Sakaguchi, Tachikawa, Ujitawara-cho, Tsuzuki-gun, Kyoto-fu 610-0289
- Website: Official website
- Symbols
- Bird: Warbling white-eye
- Flower: Camellia sasanqua
- Tree: Camellia sinensis

Ujitawara (宇治田原町, Ujitawara-chō) is a town located in Tsuzuki District, Kyoto Prefecture, Japan. As of 1 September 2023, the town has an estimated population of 8,845 in 3872 households and a population density of 39 persons per km^{2}. The total area of the town is 58.16 square kilometres (22.46 sq mi).

== Geography ==
Ujitawara is located in southeastern Kyoto Prefecture. The Uji River flows through the village. Approximately 70% of the town area of Ujitawara Town is forested, and more than 50% of this is artificially planted cedar and cypress trees.

=== Neighboring municipalities ===
Kyoto Prefecture

- Jōyō
- Kuse District (Kumiyama)
- Sōraku District (Wazuka)
- Tsuzuki District (Ide)
- Uji

Shiga Prefecture

- Kōka

=== Climate ===
Ujitawara has a humid subtropical climate (Köppen Cfa) characterized by warm summers and cool winters with light to no snowfall. The average annual temperature in Ujitawara is 13.6 °C (56.5 °F). The average annual rainfall is 1,439 mm (56.7 in) with September as the wettest month. The temperatures are highest on average in August, at around 25.7 °C (78.3 °F), and lowest in January, at around 2.0 °C (35.6 °F).

== Demographics ==
Per Japanese census data, the population of Ujitawara has fluctuated over the decades and is currently slightly declining.

Historical population
Year	Pop.	±%
1940	6,386	—
1950	8,366	+31.0%
1960	7,937	−5.1%
1970	6,991	−11.9%
1980	7,180	+2.7%
1990	8,316	+15.8%
2000	9,840	+18.3%
2010	9,711	−1.3%
2020	8,911	−8.2%

== History ==
The area of Ujitawara was part of ancient Yamashiro Province. During the Edo Period, the area was part of the direct holdings of the Tokugawa shogunate. The villages of Tawara and Ujitawara were established on April 1, 1889, with the creation of the modern municipalities system. The two villages merged on September 30, 1956, to form the town of Ujitawara.

== Government ==
Ujitawara has a mayor-council form of government with a directly elected mayor and a unicameral town council of 12 members. Ujitawara, collectively with the other municipalities of Tsuzuki District and the city of Kyōtamba, contributes two members to the Kyoto Prefectural Assembly. In terms of national politics, the town is part of the Kyoto 6th district of the lower house of the Diet of Japan.

== Economy ==
Ujitawara is a rural area, with an economy based on agriculture and forestry, with the area noted for its production of green tea and dried persimmons. The town has two industrial parks developed and sold by the private sector, Ujitawara Industrial Park and Midorienzaka Techno Park, and nearly 60 companies are located and operating there.

== Education ==
Ujitawara has two public elementary schools and one public junior high school operated by town government. The town does not have a high school.

== Transportation ==
=== Railways ===
Ujitawara does not have any passenger railway service. The nearest train stations are Yamashiro-Aodani Station (Jōyō) and Yamashiro-Taga Station (Ide) on the JR West Nara Line.

=== Highways ===
- Shin-Meishin Expressway
- National Route 307
