= Sanmon-Santō Sakamoto Sōezu =

Two Japanese maps

Sanmon-Santō Sakamoto Sōezu 1st volume (Yokawa area in Enryakuji Temple on Mount Hiei and Sakamoto area)

Sanmon-Santō Sakamoto Sōezu 2nd volume (Tō-dō area and Sai-tō area in Enryakuji Temple on Mount Hiei)

Sanmon-Santō Sakamoto Sōezu (Japanese: 山門三塔坂本惣絵図; The Whole Maps of the three Areas of Enryakuji Temple on Mount Hiei and the Area of Sakamoto) is the two old maps that shows the precincts of Enryakuji Temple (Japanese: 延暦寺, Hepburn: Enryakuji) on Mount Hiei (Japanese: 比叡山, Hepburn: Hieizan) and Sakamoto area (Japanese: 坂本, Hepburn: Sakamoto) at the foot of Mount Hiei, Otsu City, Shiga Prefecture, Japan. The maps was made in 1767 (the middle of the Edo period, Japan). The author is unknown.

- The 1st volume of the maps shows Yokawa area (Hoku-tō area) (Japanese: 横川地区 (北塔地区); The North Pagoda area) in the precincts of Enryakuji Temple on Mount Hiei and Sakamoto area at the foot of Mount Hiei.
- The 2nd volume of the maps shows Tō-dō area (Japanese: 東塔地区; The East Pagoda area) and Sai-tō area (Japanese: 西塔地区; The West Pagoda area) in the precincts of Enryakuji Temple on Mount Hiei.

== Meaning of the title ==
The meaning of the title, Sanmon-Santō Sakamoto Sōezu, is "the whole map of the three areas of Enryakuji Temple on Mount Hiei and the area of Sakamoto".

The meanings of the words that make up the title, Sanmon-Santō Sakamoto Sōezu, are as follows.

- The word "sanmon" (Japanese: 山門) is another name of Enryakuji Temple on Mount Hiei.
- The word "santō" (Japanese: 三塔) is a generic term used to refer to the three areas in the precincts of Enryakuji Temple: Tō-dō area (Japanese: 東塔地区; The East Pagoda area), Sai-tō area (Japanese: 西塔地区; The West Pagoda area), and Yokawa area (Hoku-tō area) (Japanese: 横川地区 (北塔地区); The North Pagoda area).
- The word "Sakamoto" (Japanese: 坂本) refers to the Sakamoto area at the eastern foot of Mount Hiei (present-day Sakamoto, Otsu City, Shiga Prefecture, Japan).
- The word "sō" (Japanese: 惣) means "whole" or "all".
- The word "ezu" (Japanese: 絵図) had used before the Meiji era (Japanese: 明治時代) to mean what we call a "map" today.

== As a historical document ==
Enryakuji Temple is registered as a UNESCO World Heritage Site as one of the 17 temples and shrines that make up the Historic Monuments of Ancient Kyoto (Kyoto, Uji and Otsu Cities). In addition, Enryakuji Temple possesses several Japanese national treasures, including Konpon-chūdō (Japanese: 根本中堂; The largest central main hall of Enryakuji Temple), and numerous Japanese important cultural properties. Therefore, Enryakuji Temple is a historically and culturally important place, and it once had possessed far more cultural properties and historical documents than are still in existence.

But the enormous cultural properties and historical documents of Enryakuji Temple suffered damage from the Siege of Mount Hiei in 1571 and much of these were lost. Currently, there are only a few historical documents that can tell us what the precincts of Enryakuji Temple in the past looked like.

Sanmon-Santō Sakamoto Sōezu is probably the most detailed pictorial old maps of the precincts of Enryakuji Temple in existence and also shows the halls of temples and shrines that may have existed before 1571. Therefore, these maps are valuable historical documents to know about what the precincts in the past looked like.

== Repository ==
Currently, these maps are one of the collections in the National Archives of Japan (NAJ). (These maps were formerly one of the collections in the Japanese Cabinet Library.)

== Dimensions ==
- 1st volume size : Width 280 cm x Height 187.5 cm
- 2nd volume size : Width 279 cm x Height 187.5 cm

== See also ==
- Enryakuji Temple
- Mount Hiei
- Take Kakuchō (Japanese: 武覚超)
  Ph.D. in Buddhist Studies and a Japanese Buddhist monk of the Tendai sect.

== Gallery ==
=== Sanmon-Santō Sakamoto Sōezu 1st volume ===
Sanmon-Santō Sakamoto Sōezu 1st volume (Yokawa area in Enryakuji Temple on Mount Hiei and Sakamoto area)

==== JPEG (.jpg) ====
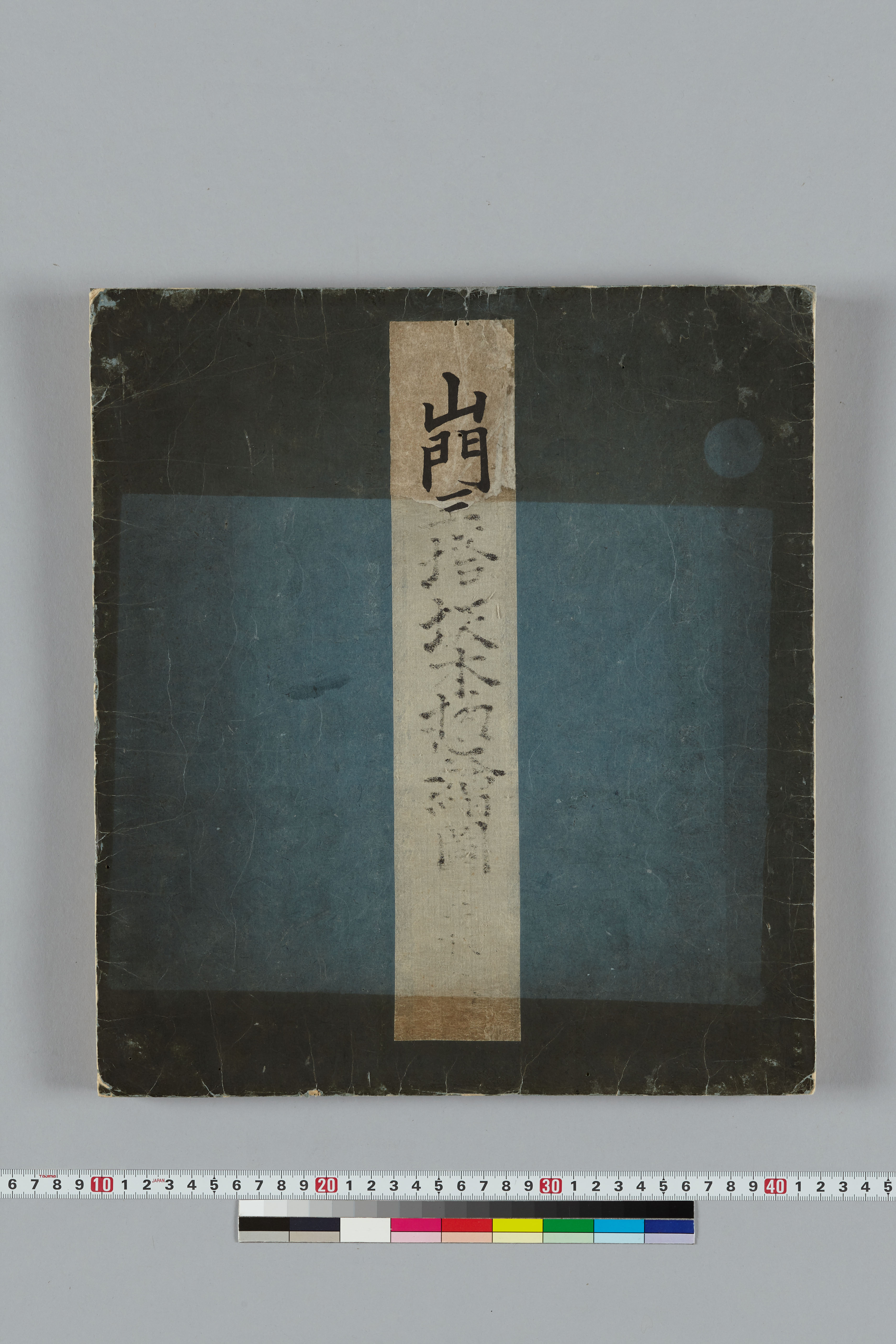
Sanmon-Santō Sakamoto Sōezu (front cover of the 1st volume)

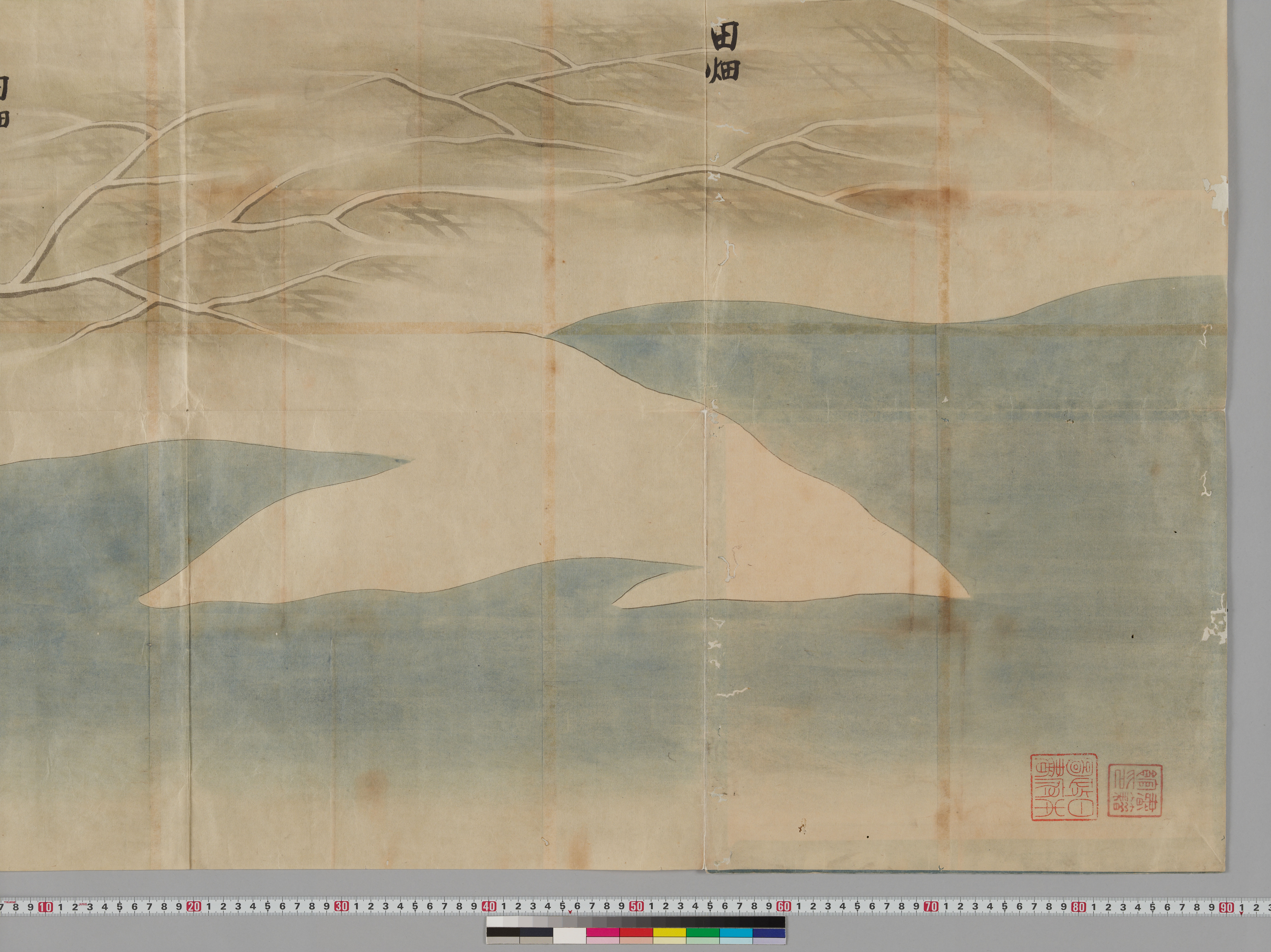
Sanmon-Santō Sakamoto Sōezu (part 1 of the 1st volume)

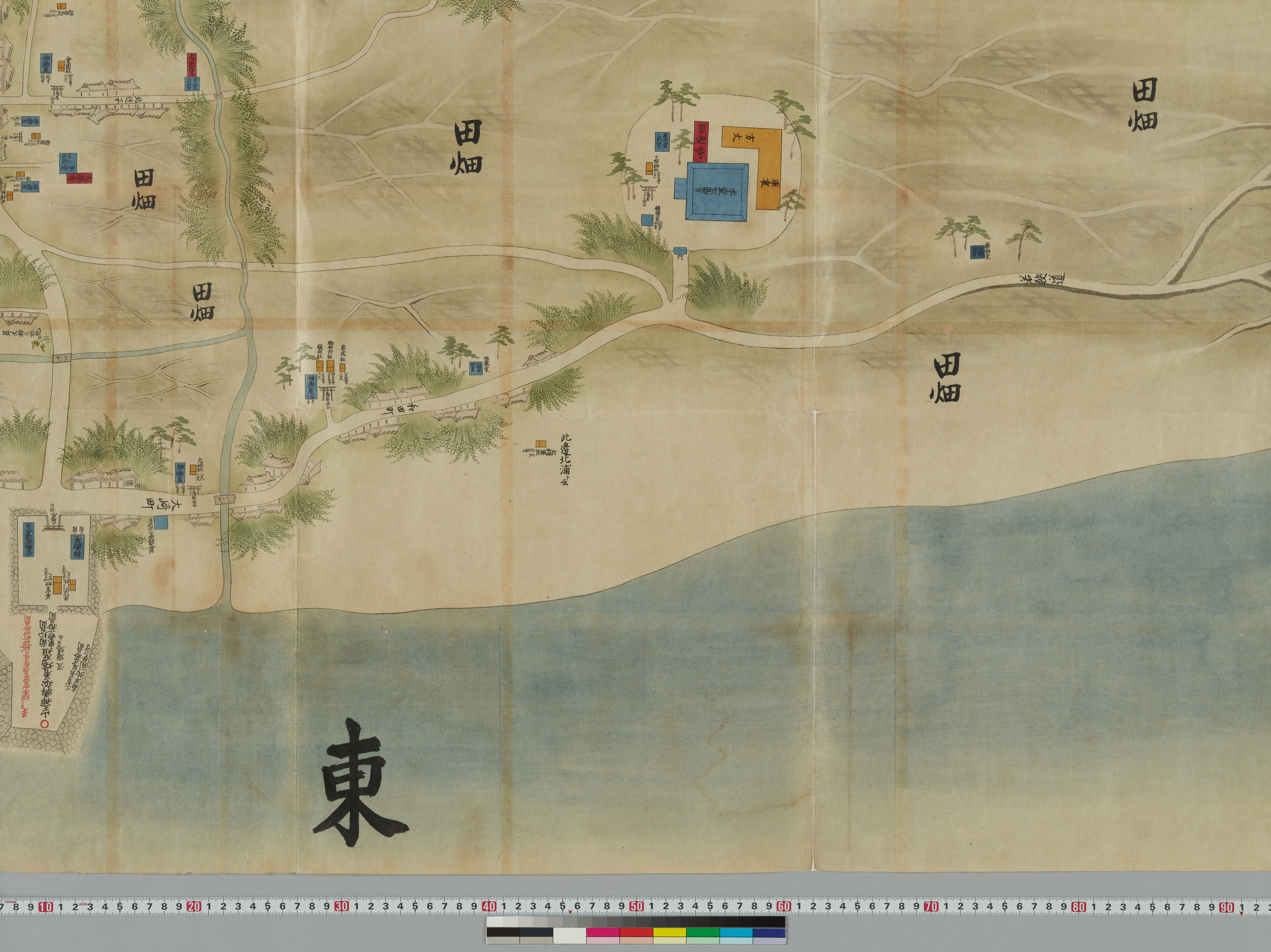
Sanmon-Santō Sakamoto Sōezu (part 2 of the 1st volume)

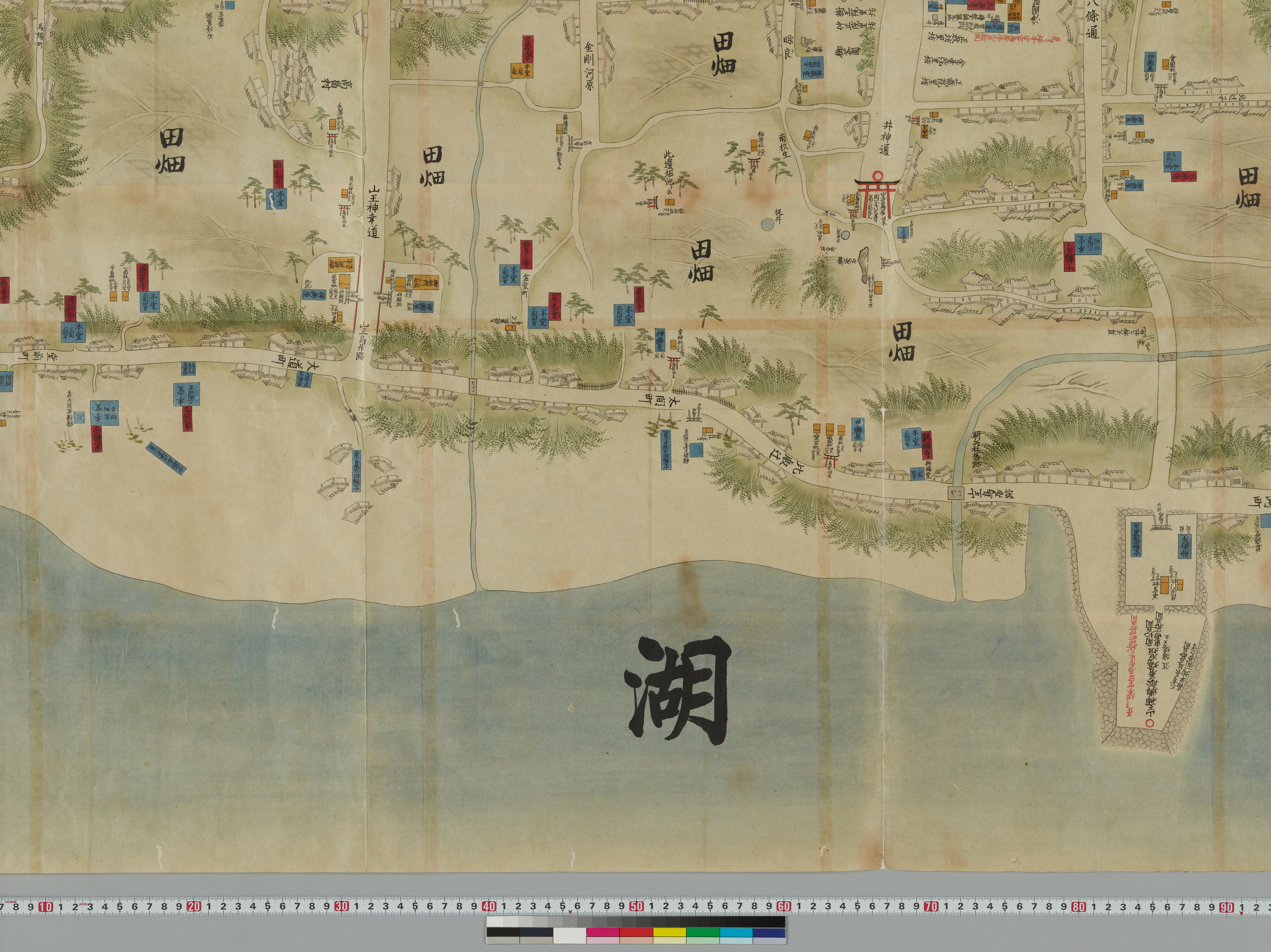
Sanmon-Santō Sakamoto Sōezu (part 3 of the 1st volume)

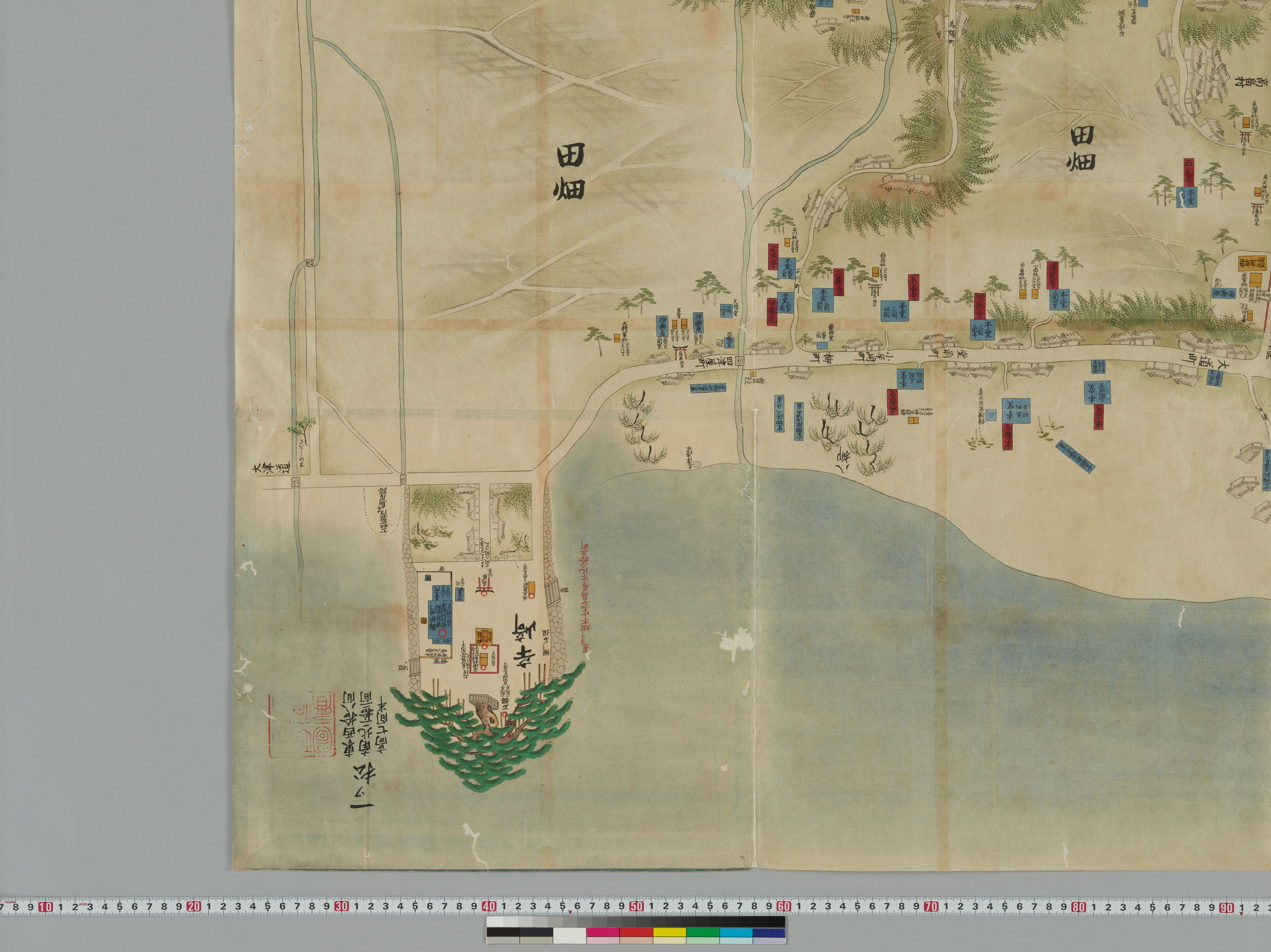
Sanmon-Santō Sakamoto Sōezu (part 4 of the 1st volume)

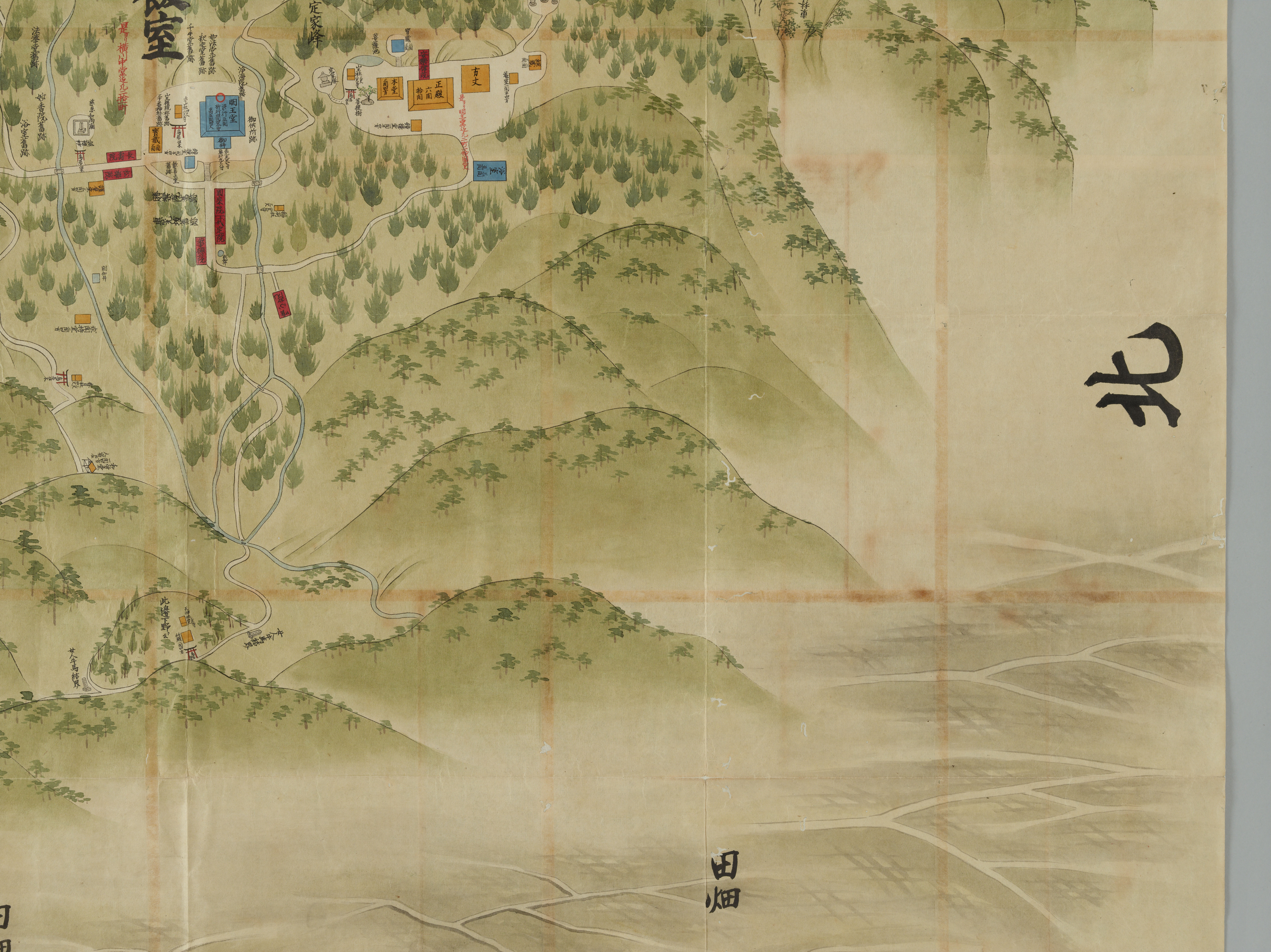
Sanmon-Santō Sakamoto Sōezu (part 5 of the 1st volume)

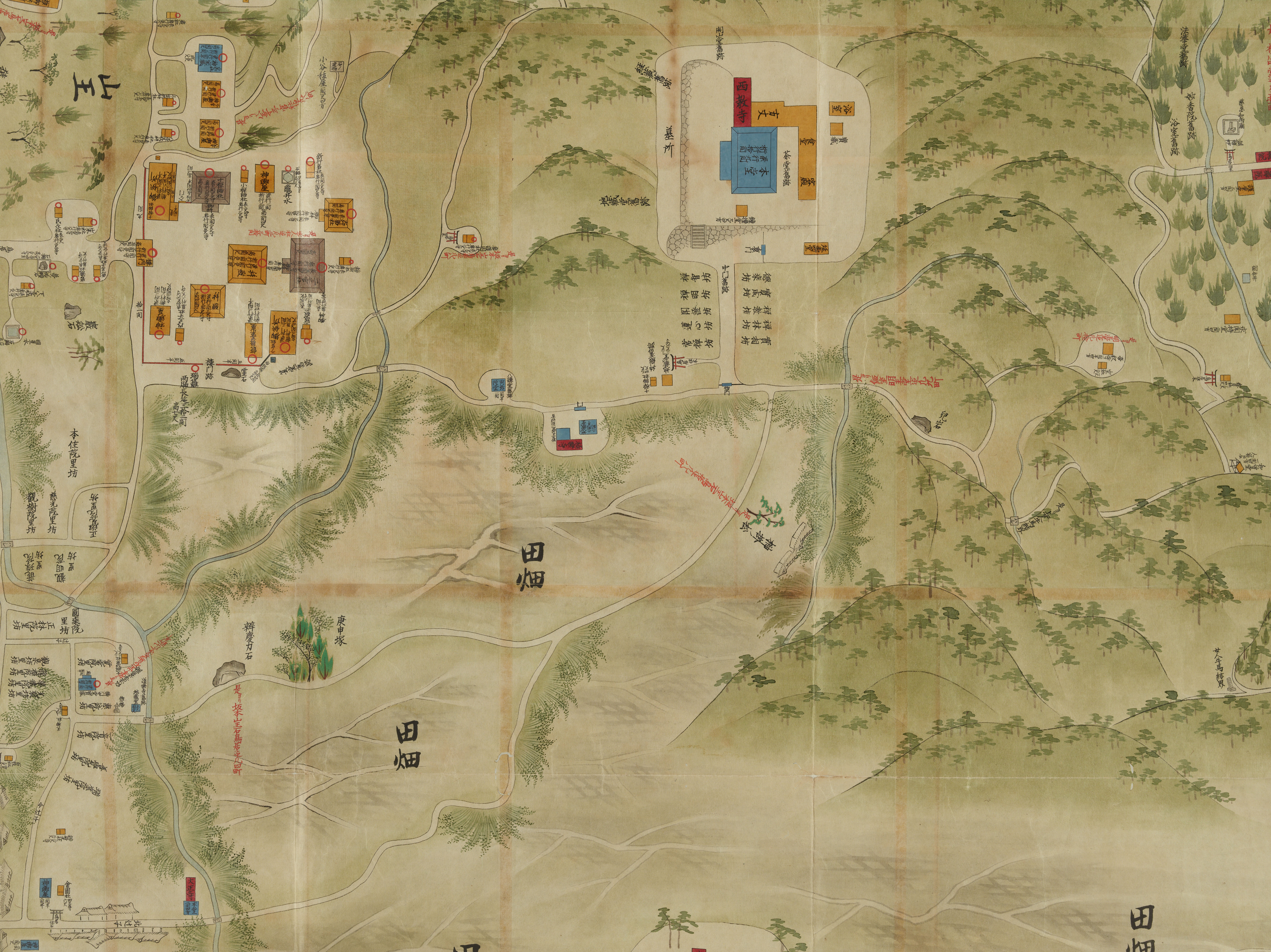
Sanmon-Santō Sakamoto Sōezu (part 6 of the 1st volume)

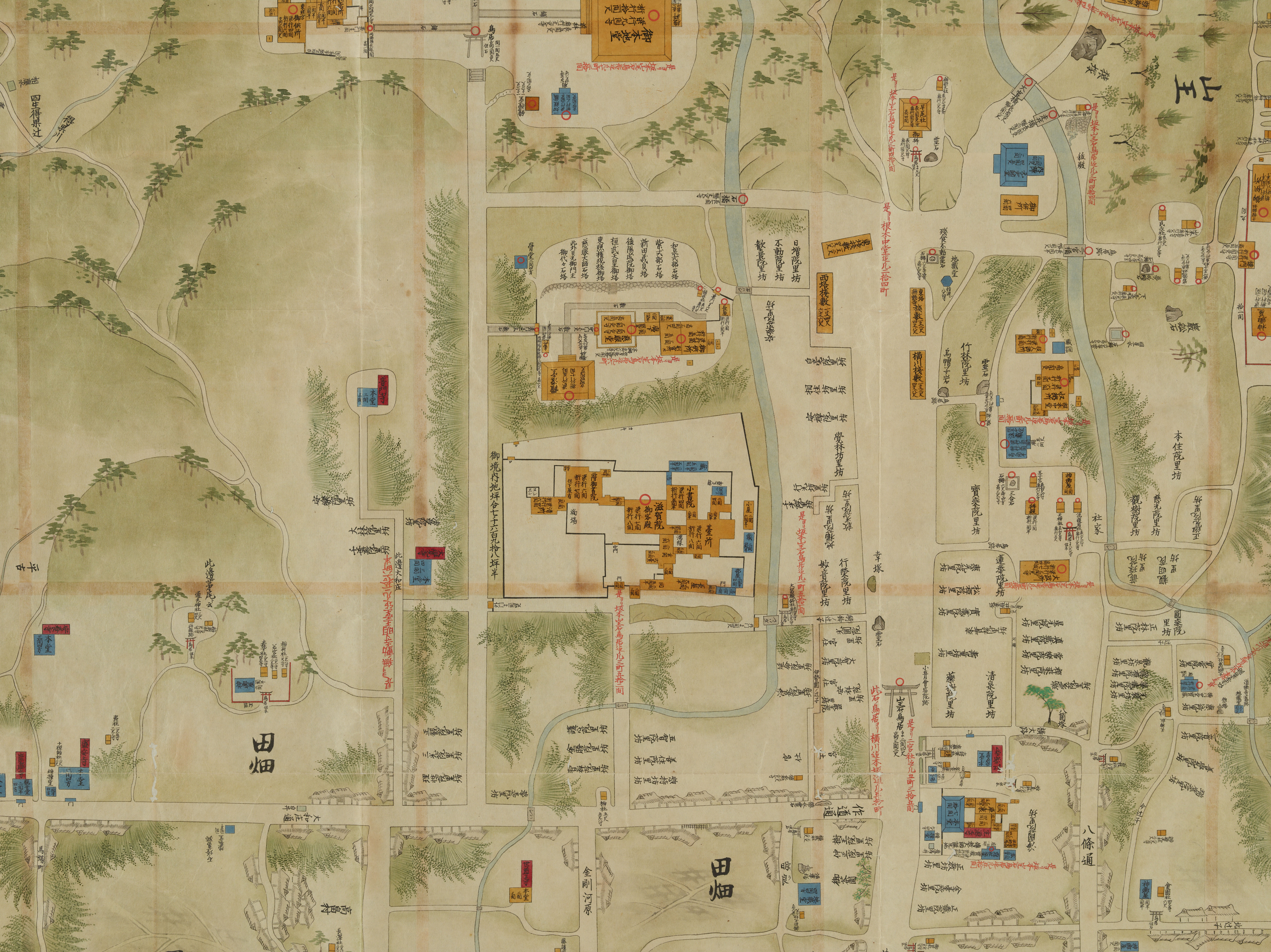
Sanmon-Santō Sakamoto Sōezu (part 7 of the 1st volume)

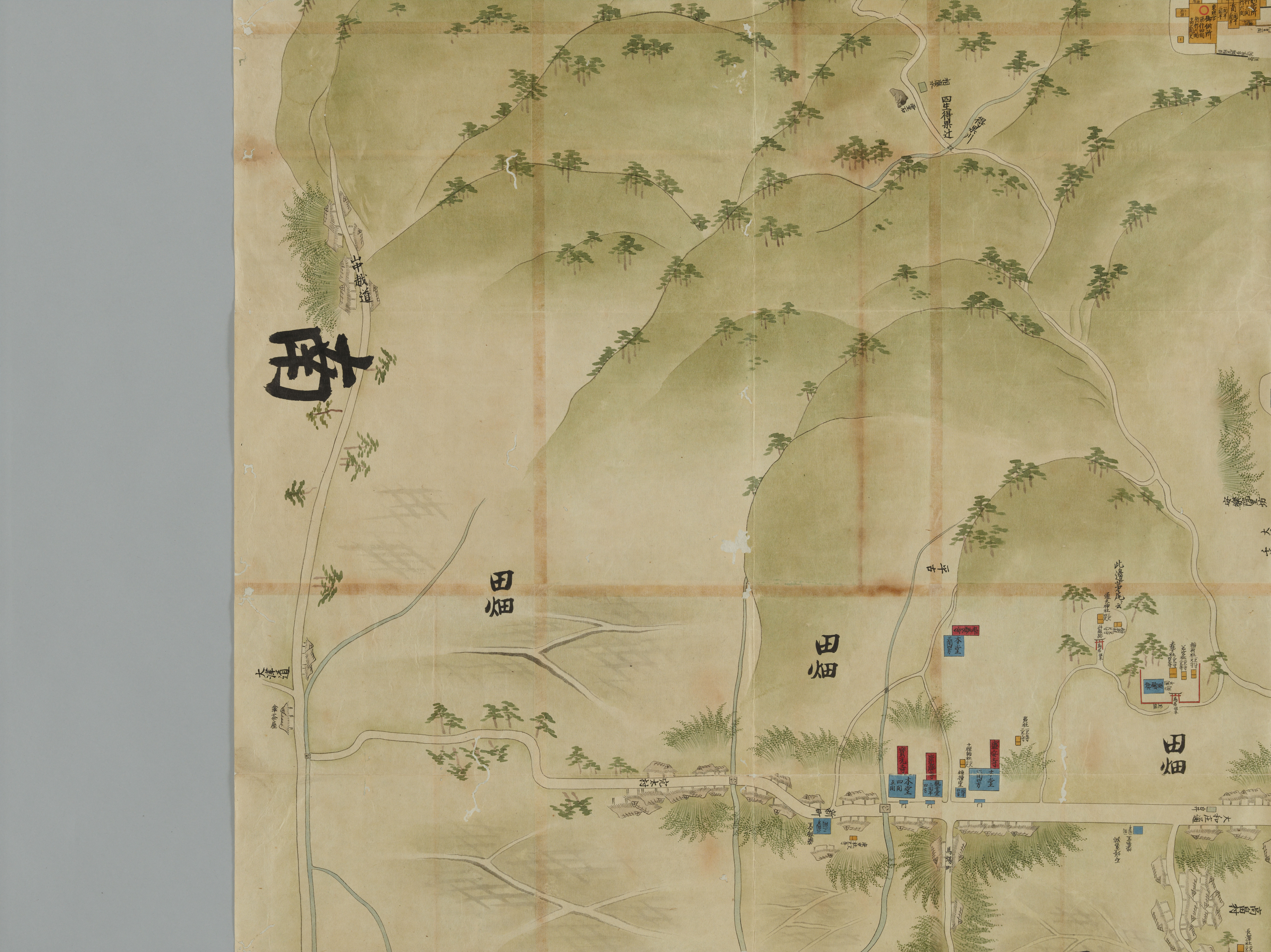
Sanmon-Santō Sakamoto Sōezu (part 8 of the 1st volume)

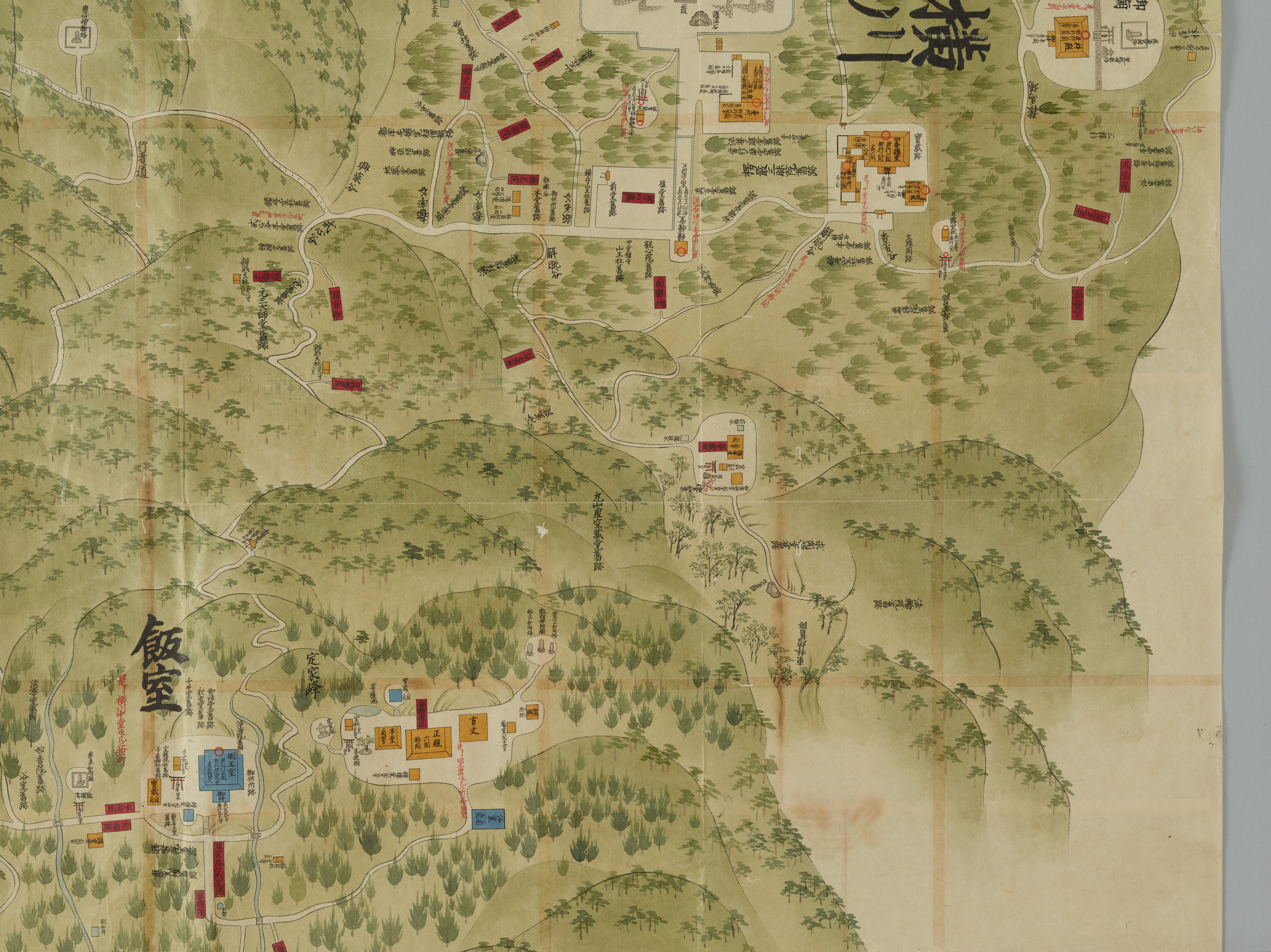
Sanmon-Santō Sakamoto Sōezu (part 9 of the 1st volume)

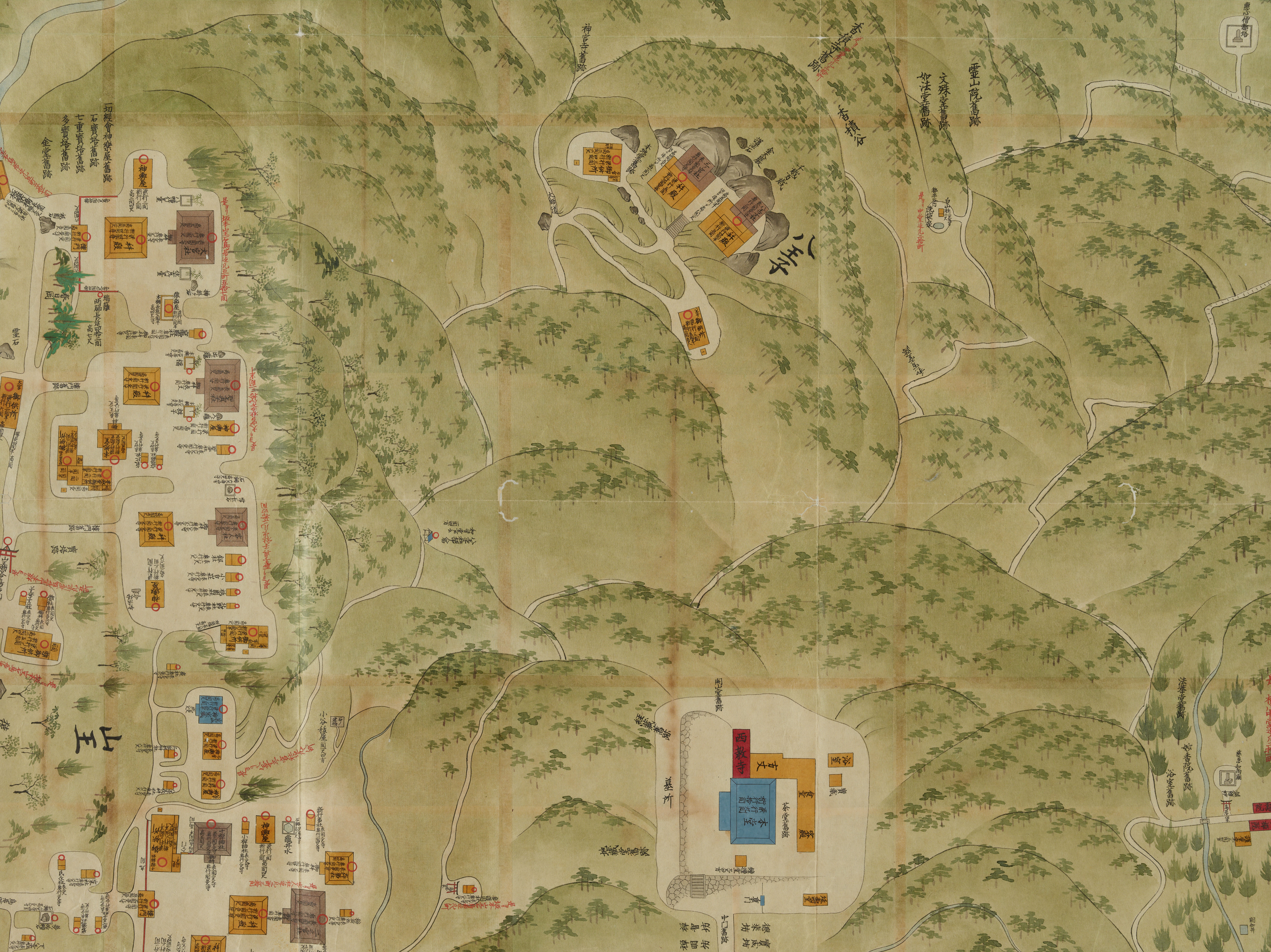
Sanmon-Santō Sakamoto Sōezu (part 10 of the 1st volume)

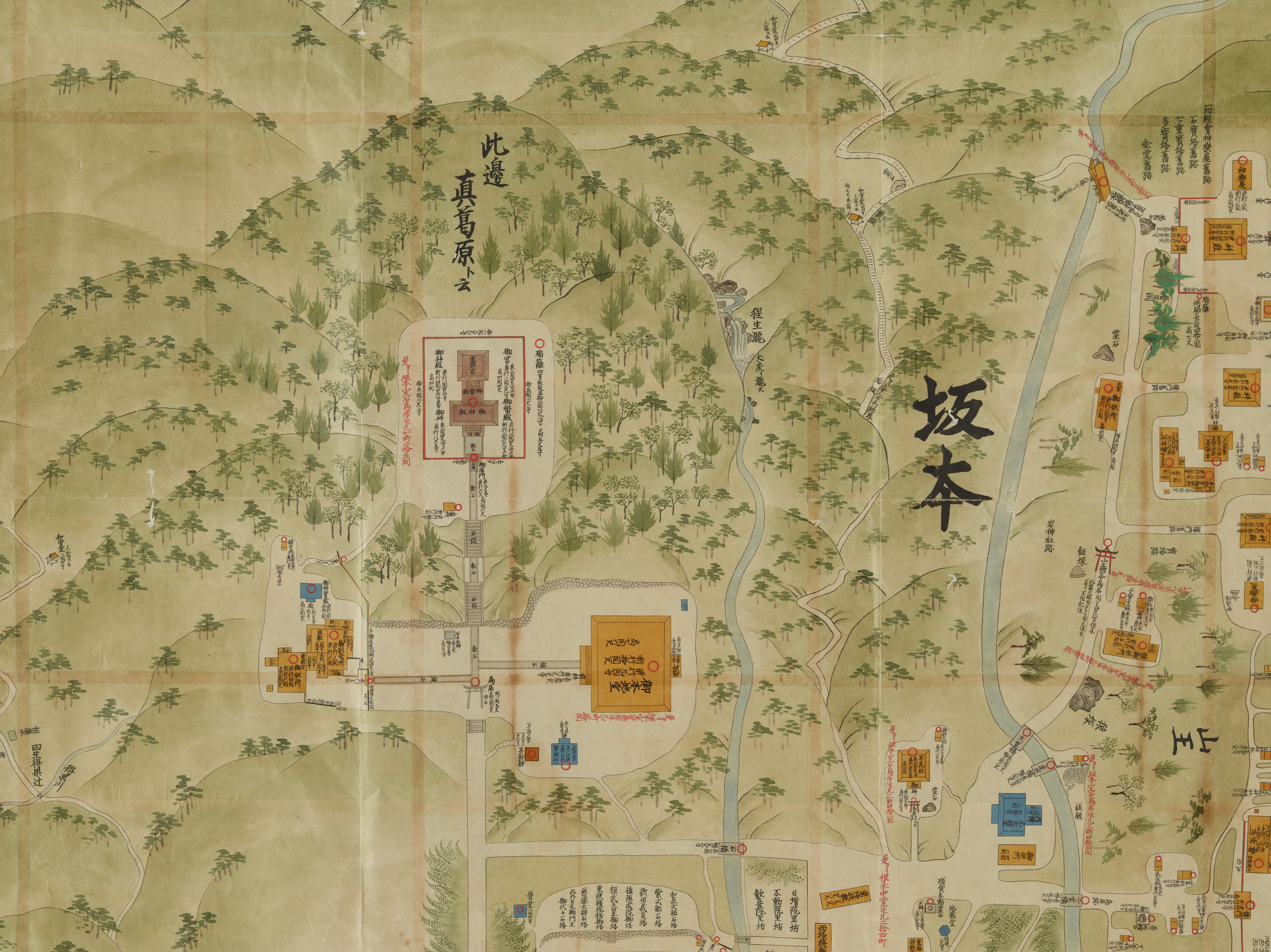
Sanmon-Santō Sakamoto Sōezu (part 11 of the 1st volume)

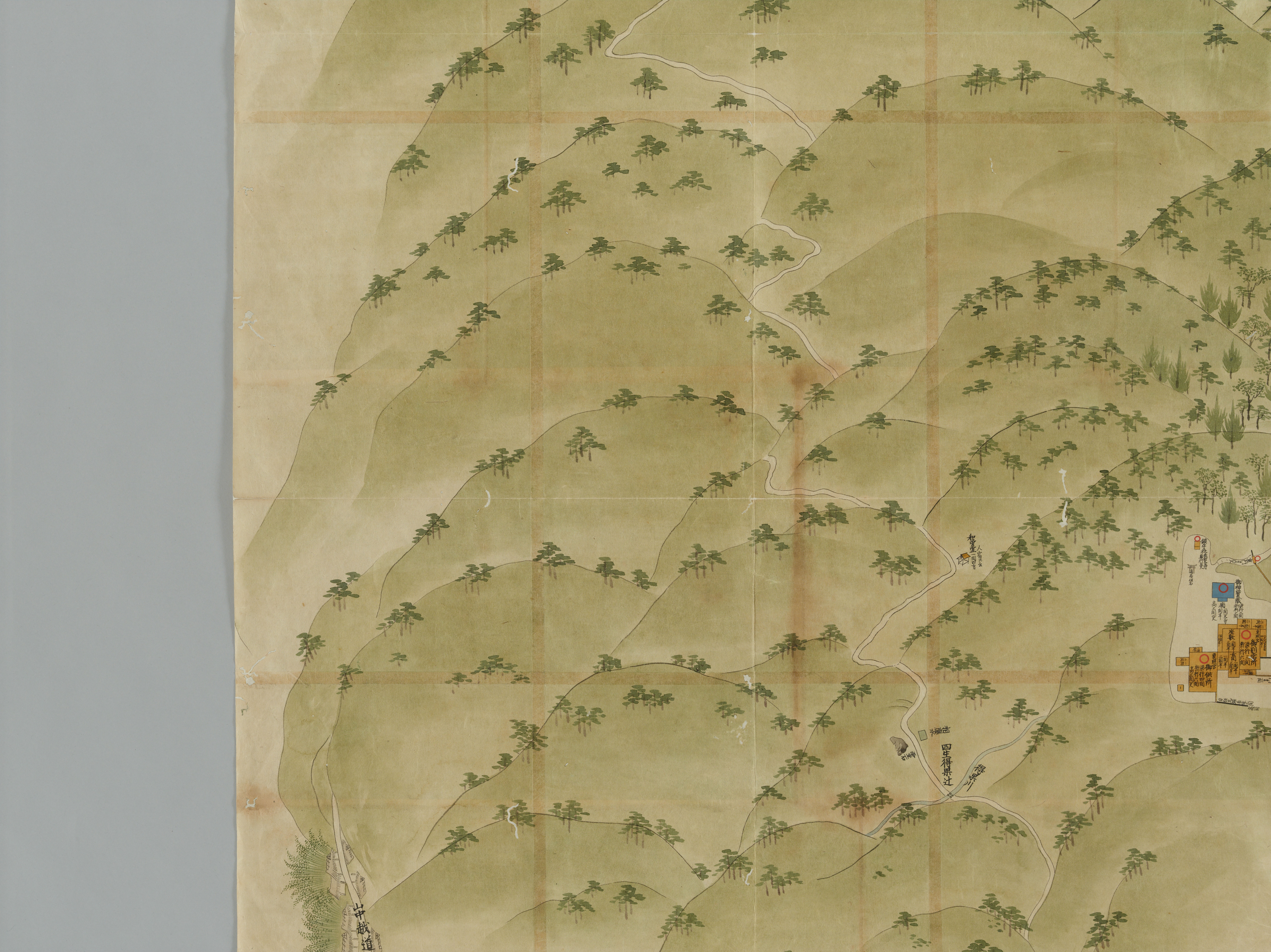
Sanmon-Santō Sakamoto Sōezu (part 12 of the 1st volume)

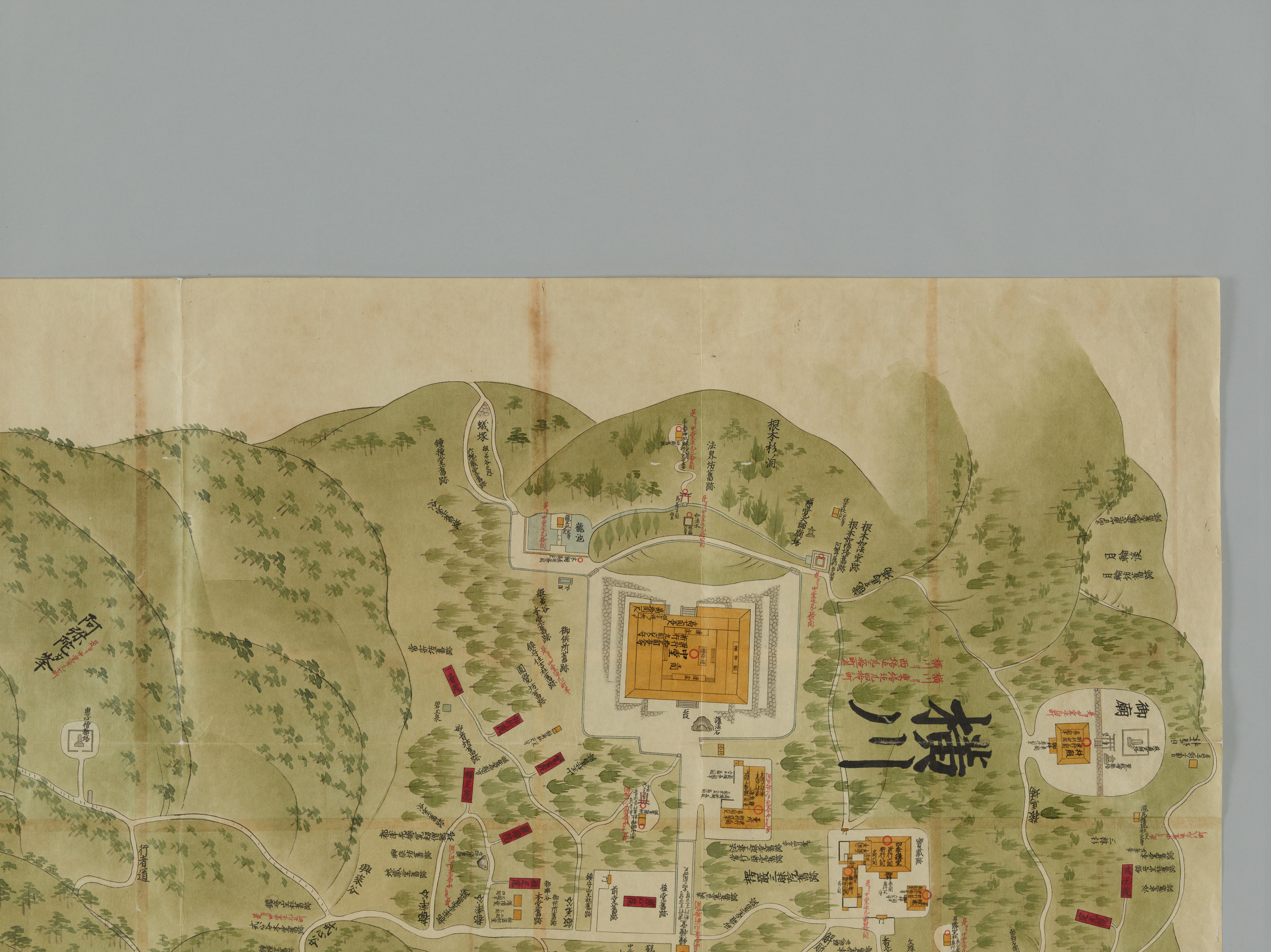
Sanmon-Santō Sakamoto Sōezu (part 13 of the 1st volume)

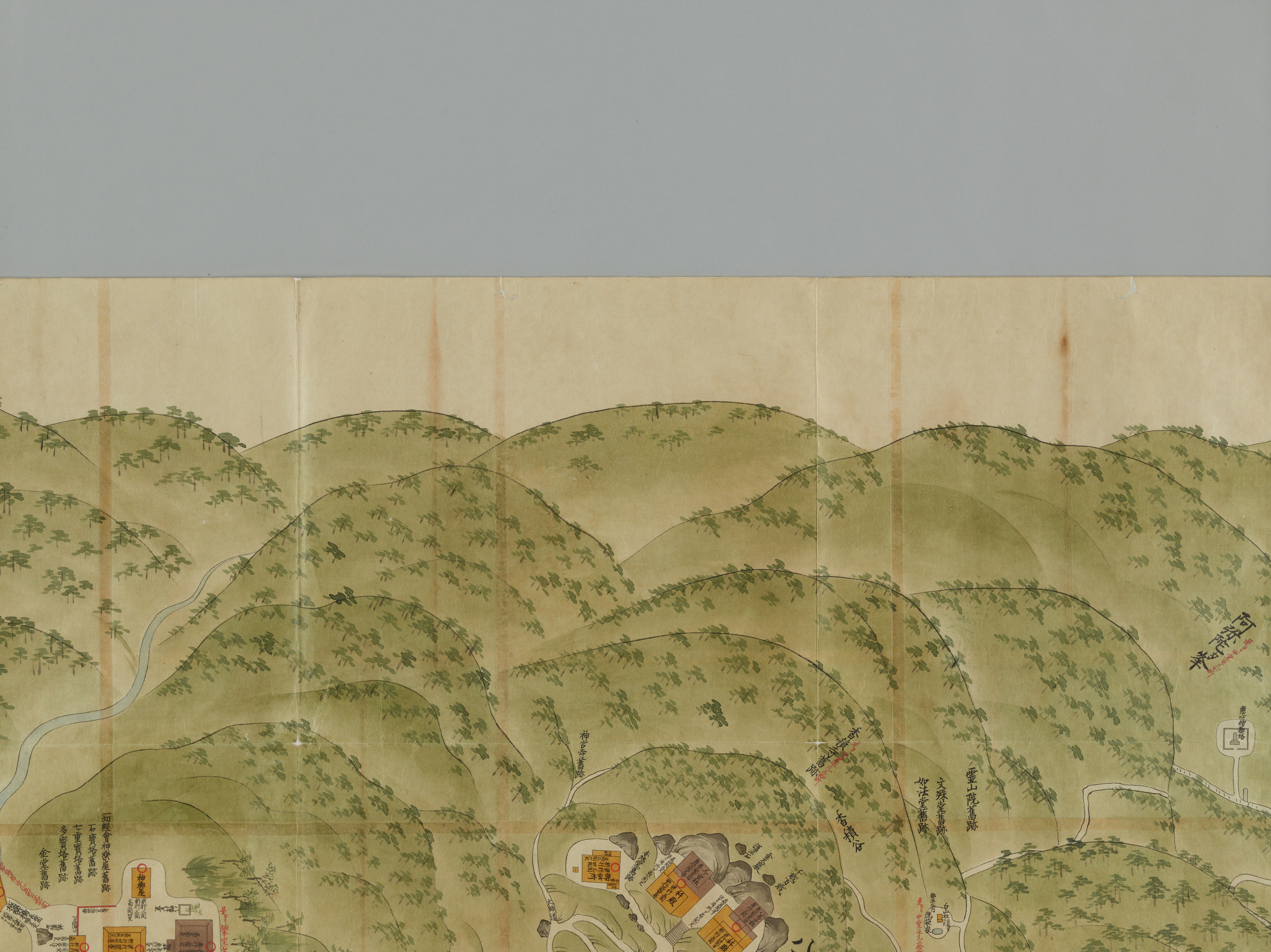
Sanmon-Santō Sakamoto Sōezu (part 14 of the 1st volume)

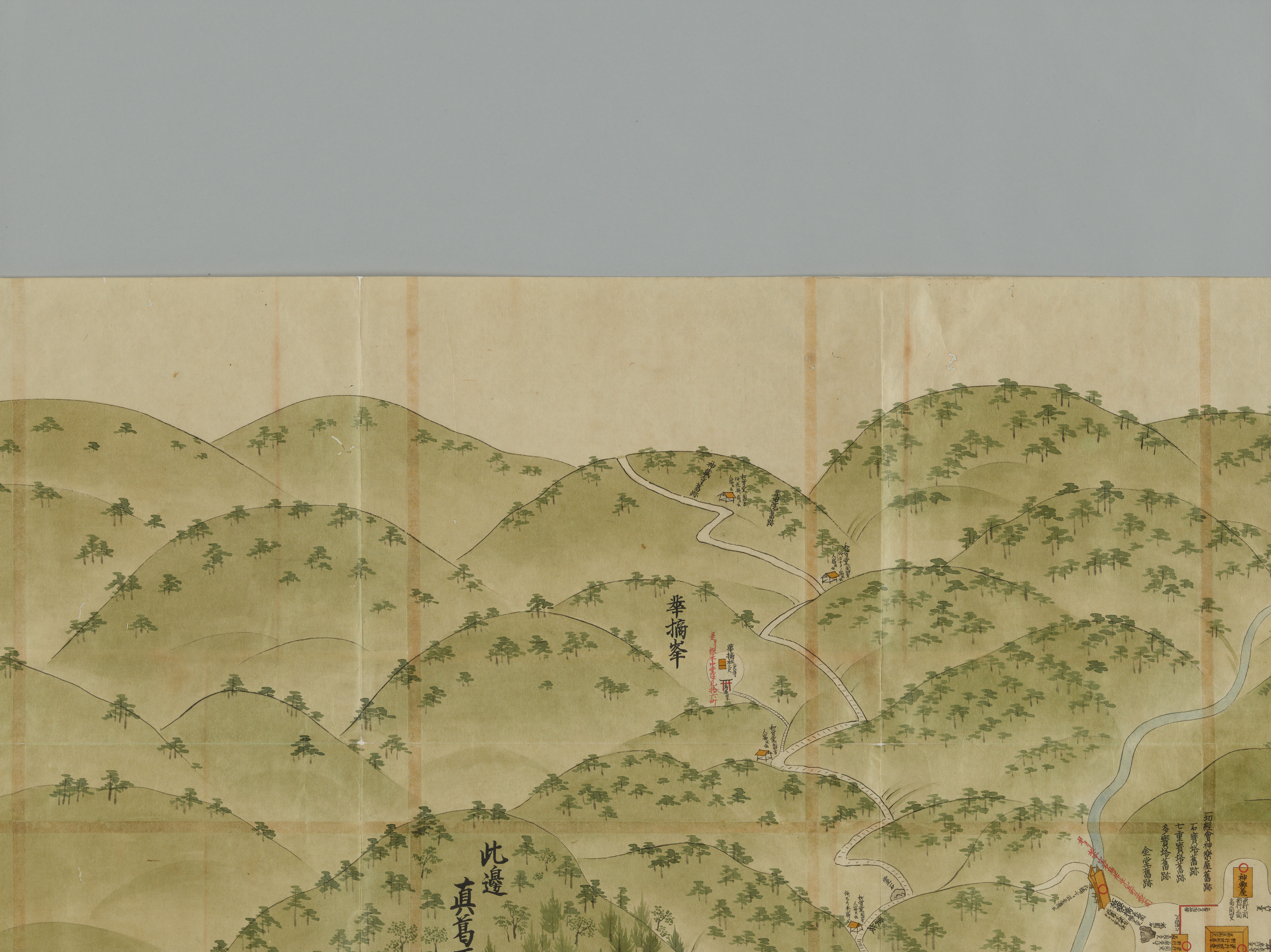
Sanmon-Santō Sakamoto Sōezu (part 15 of the 1st volume)

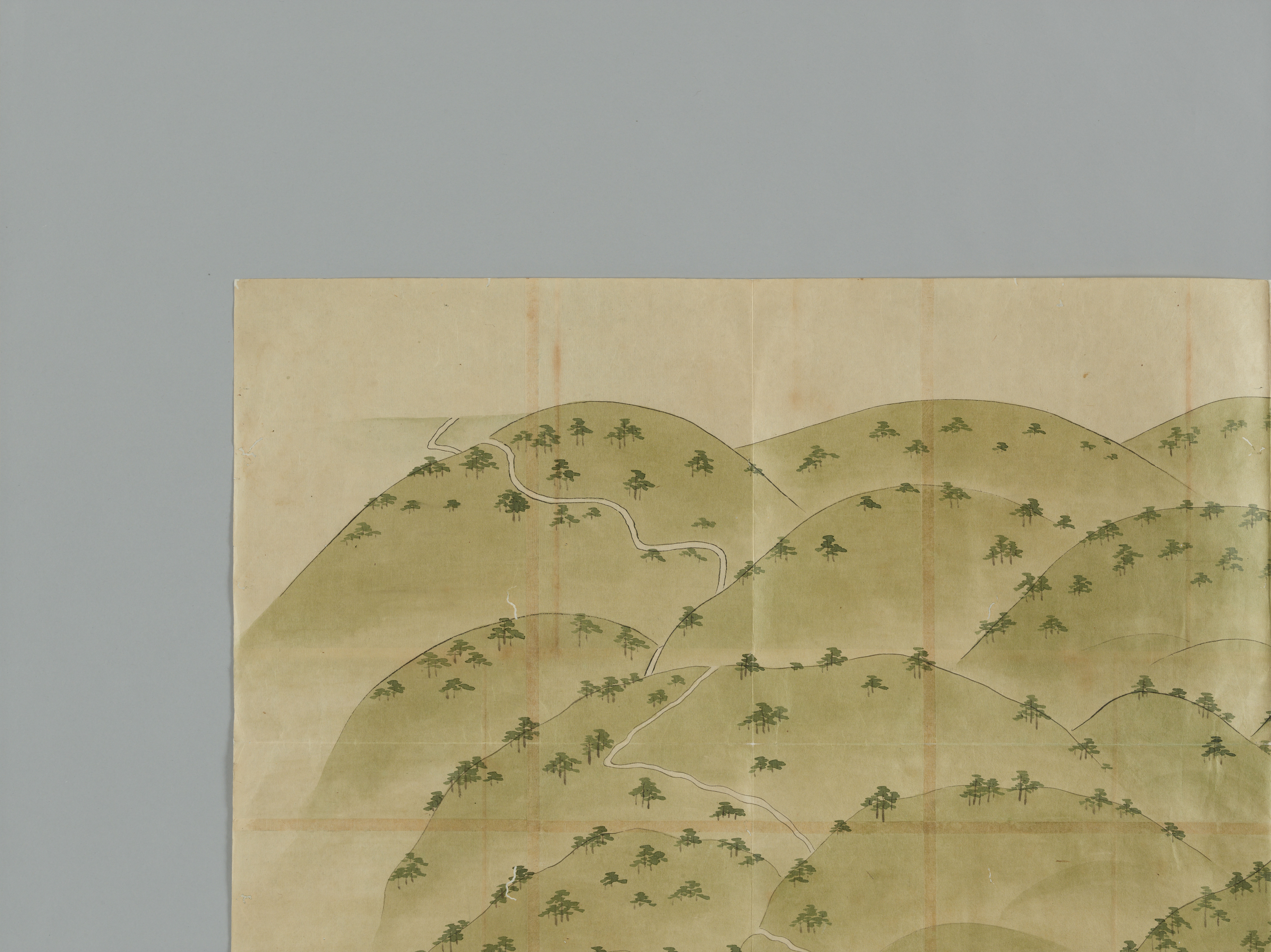
Sanmon-Santō Sakamoto Sōezu (part 16 of the 1st volume)

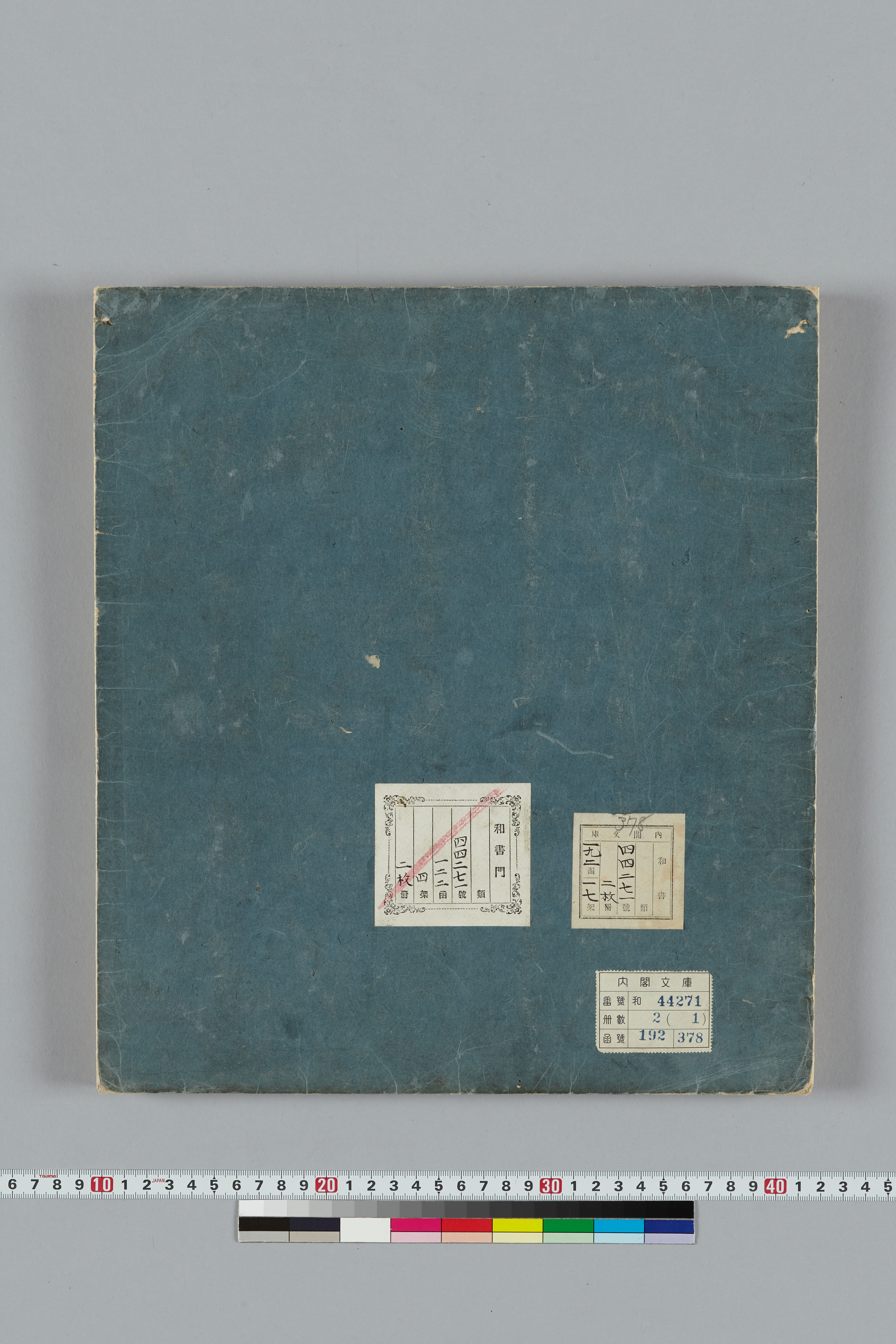
Sanmon-Santō Sakamoto Sōezu (back cover of the 1st volume)

==== TIFF (.tif) ====
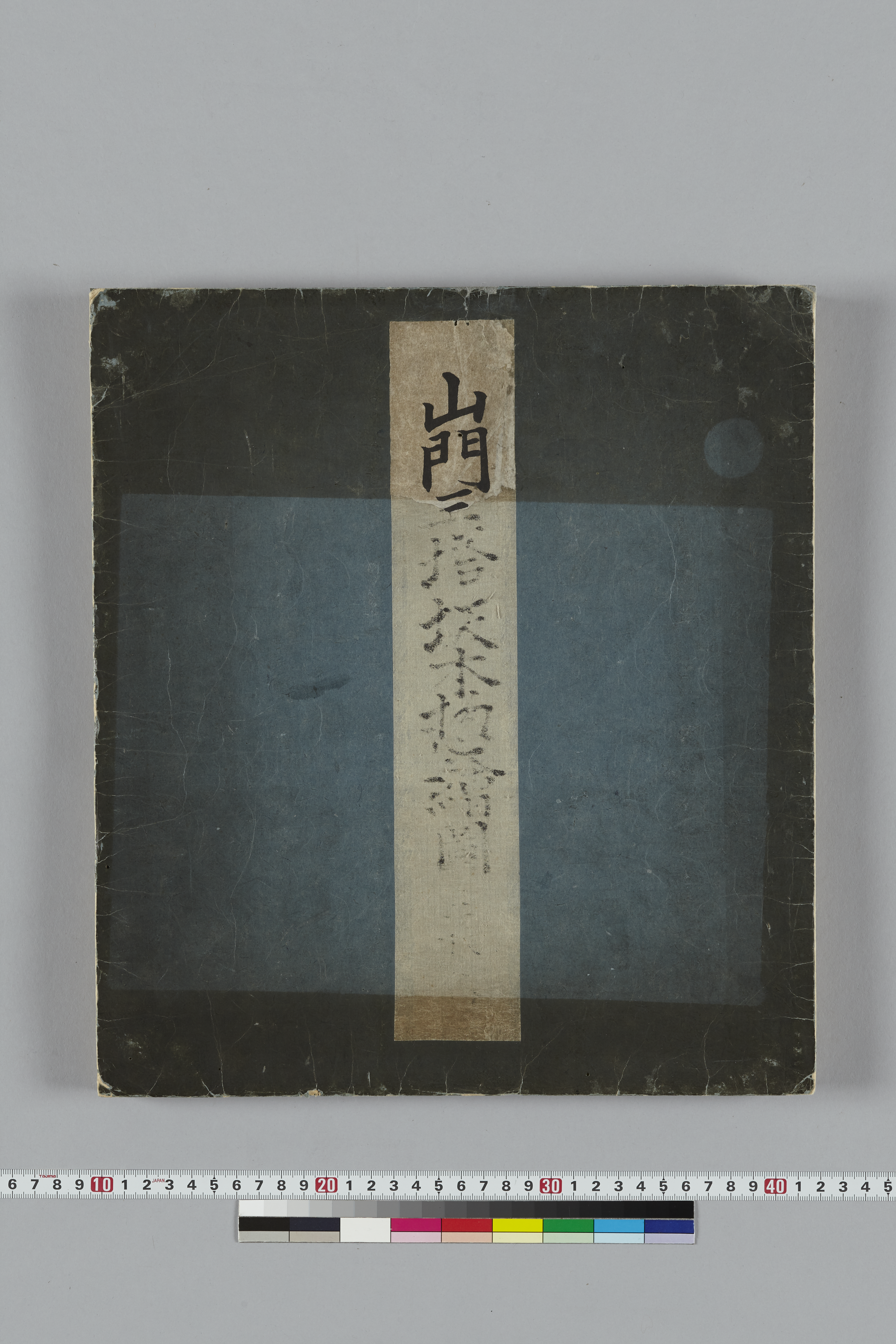
Sanmon-Santō Sakamoto Sōezu (front cover of the 1st volume)

Sanmon-Santō Sakamoto Sōezu (part 1 of the 1st volume)

Sanmon-Santō Sakamoto Sōezu (part 2 of the 1st volume)

Sanmon-Santō Sakamoto Sōezu (part 3 of the 1st volume)

Sanmon-Santō Sakamoto Sōezu (part 4 of the 1st volume)

Sanmon-Santō Sakamoto Sōezu (part 5 of the 1st volume)

Sanmon-Santō Sakamoto Sōezu (part 6 of the 1st volume)

Sanmon-Santō Sakamoto Sōezu (part 7 of the 1st volume)

Sanmon-Santō Sakamoto Sōezu (part 8 of the 1st volume)

Sanmon-Santō Sakamoto Sōezu (part 9 of the 1st volume)

Sanmon-Santō Sakamoto Sōezu (part 10 of the 1st volume)

Sanmon-Santō Sakamoto Sōezu (part 11 of the 1st volume)

Sanmon-Santō Sakamoto Sōezu (part 12 of the 1st volume)

Sanmon-Santō Sakamoto Sōezu (part 13 of the 1st volume)

Sanmon-Santō Sakamoto Sōezu (part 14 of the 1st volume)

Sanmon-Santō Sakamoto Sōezu (part 15 of the 1st volume)

Sanmon-Santō Sakamoto Sōezu (part 16 of the 1st volume)

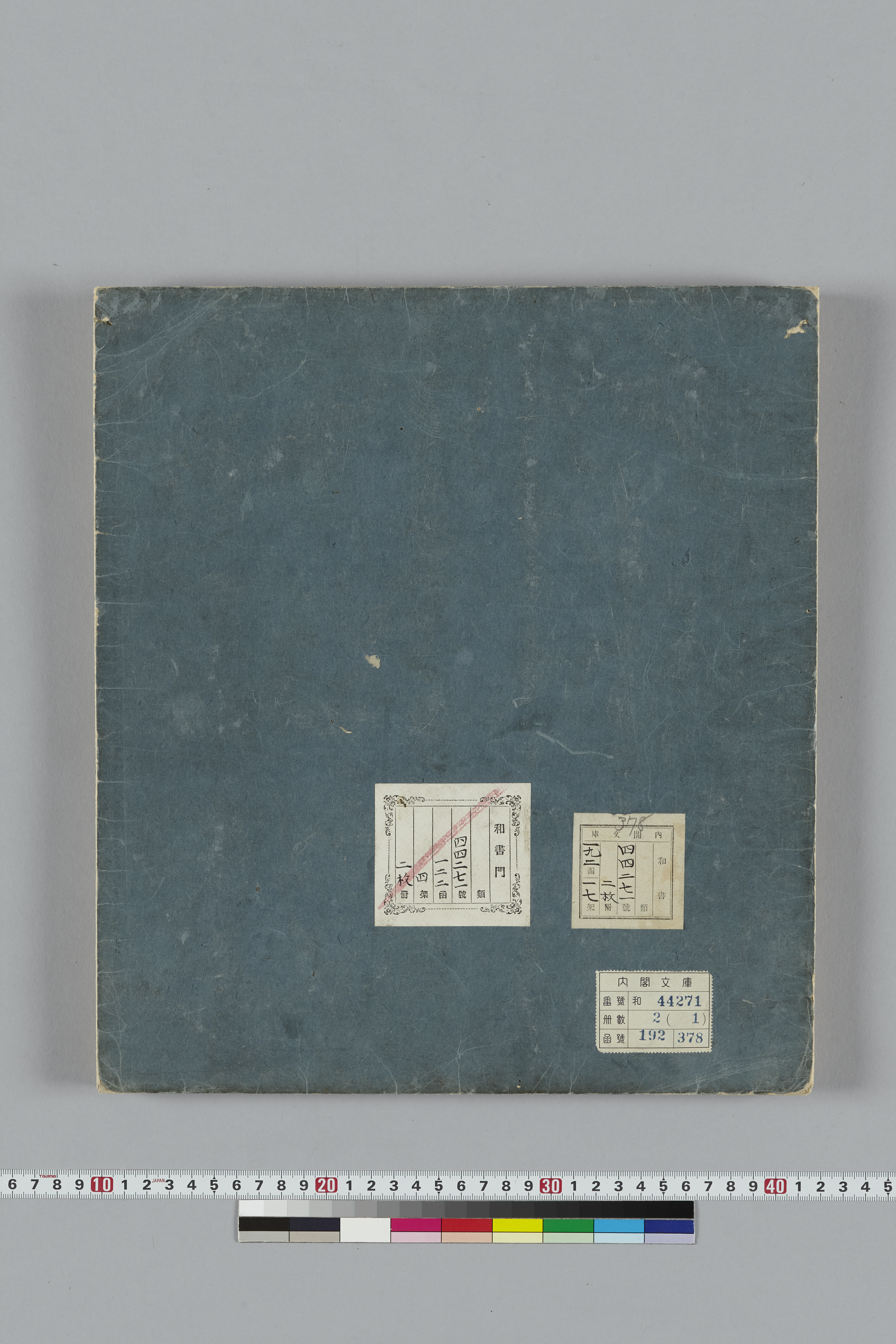
Sanmon-Santō Sakamoto Sōezu (back cover of the 1st volume)

=== Sanmon-Santō Sakamoto Sōezu 2nd volume ===
Sanmon-Santō Sakamoto Sōezu 2nd volume (Tō-dō area and Sai-tō area in Enryakuji Temple on Mount Hiei)

==== JPEG (.jpg) ====
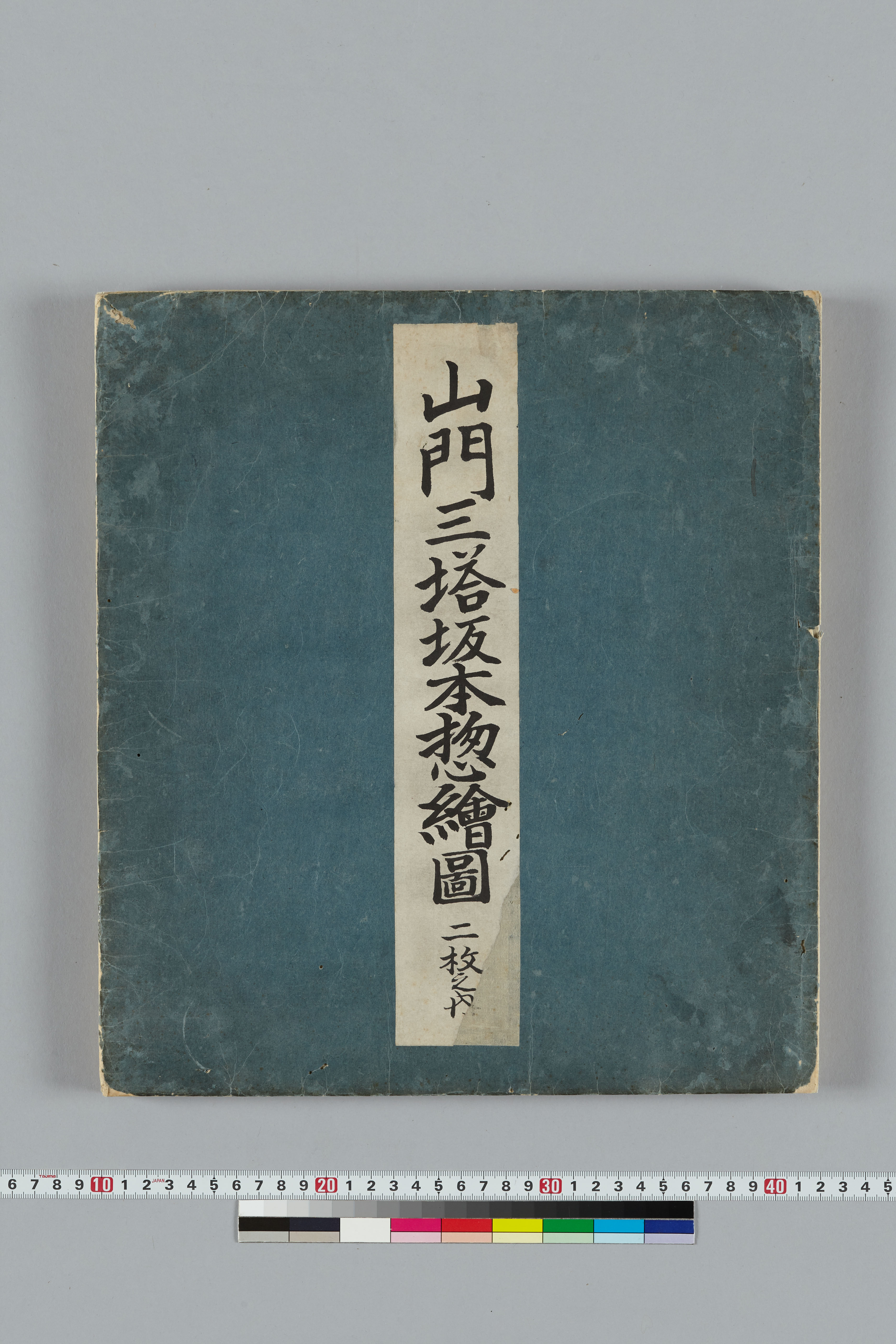
Sanmon-Santō Sakamoto Sōezu (front cover of the 2nd volume)

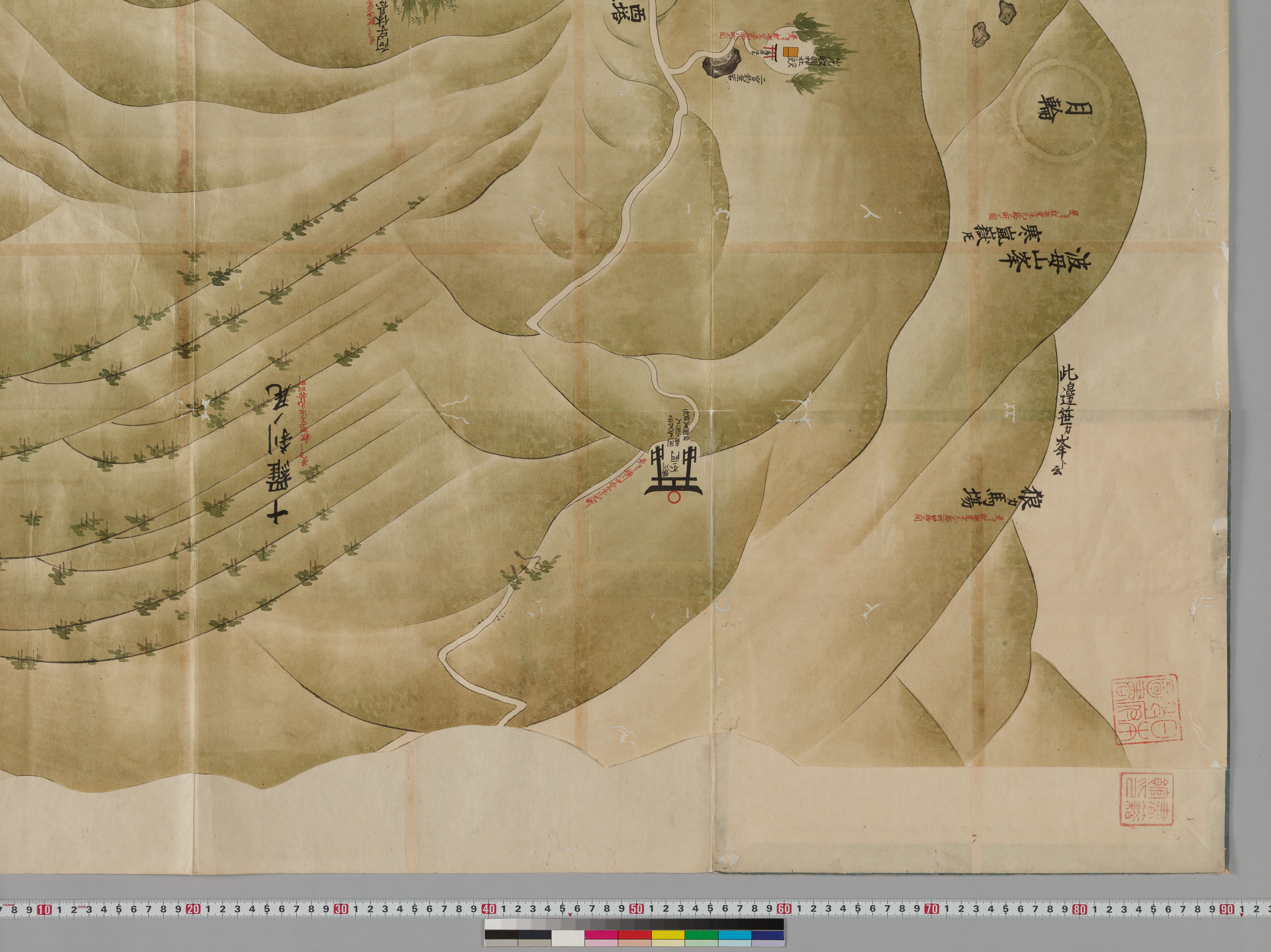
Sanmon-Santō Sakamoto Sōezu (part 1 of the 2nd volume)

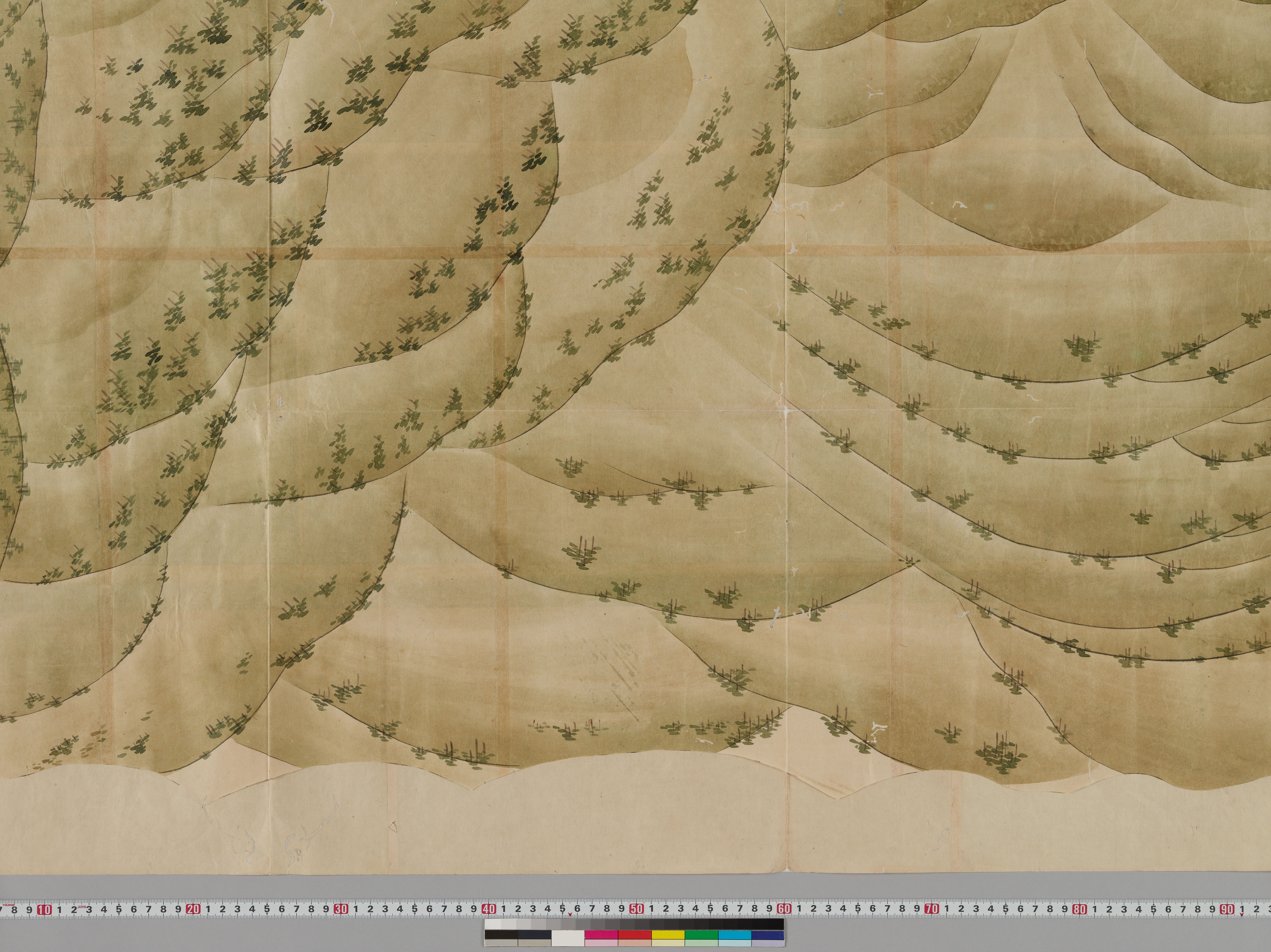
Sanmon-Santō Sakamoto Sōezu (part 2 of the 2nd volume)

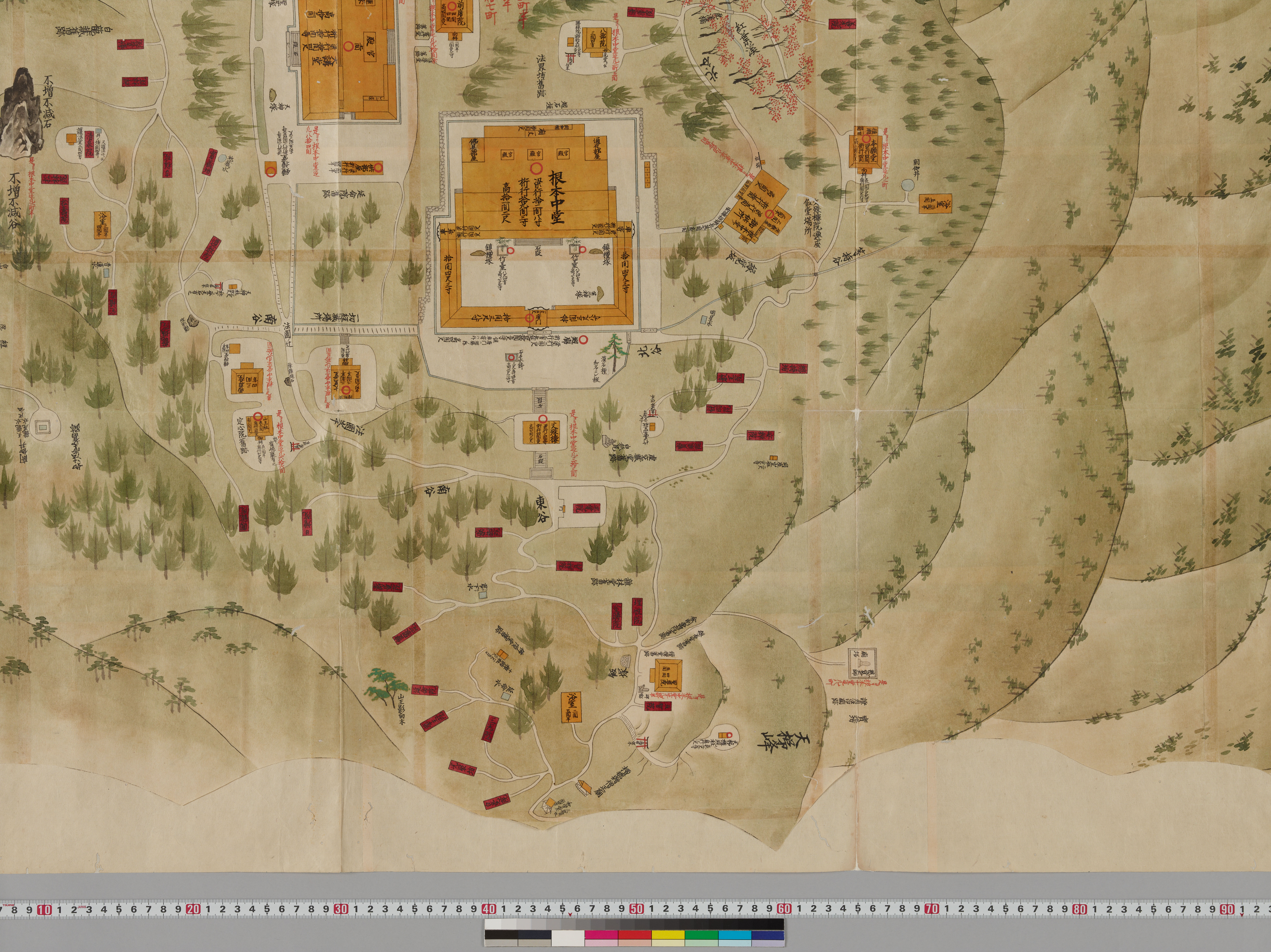
Sanmon-Santō Sakamoto Sōezu (part 3 of the 2nd volume)

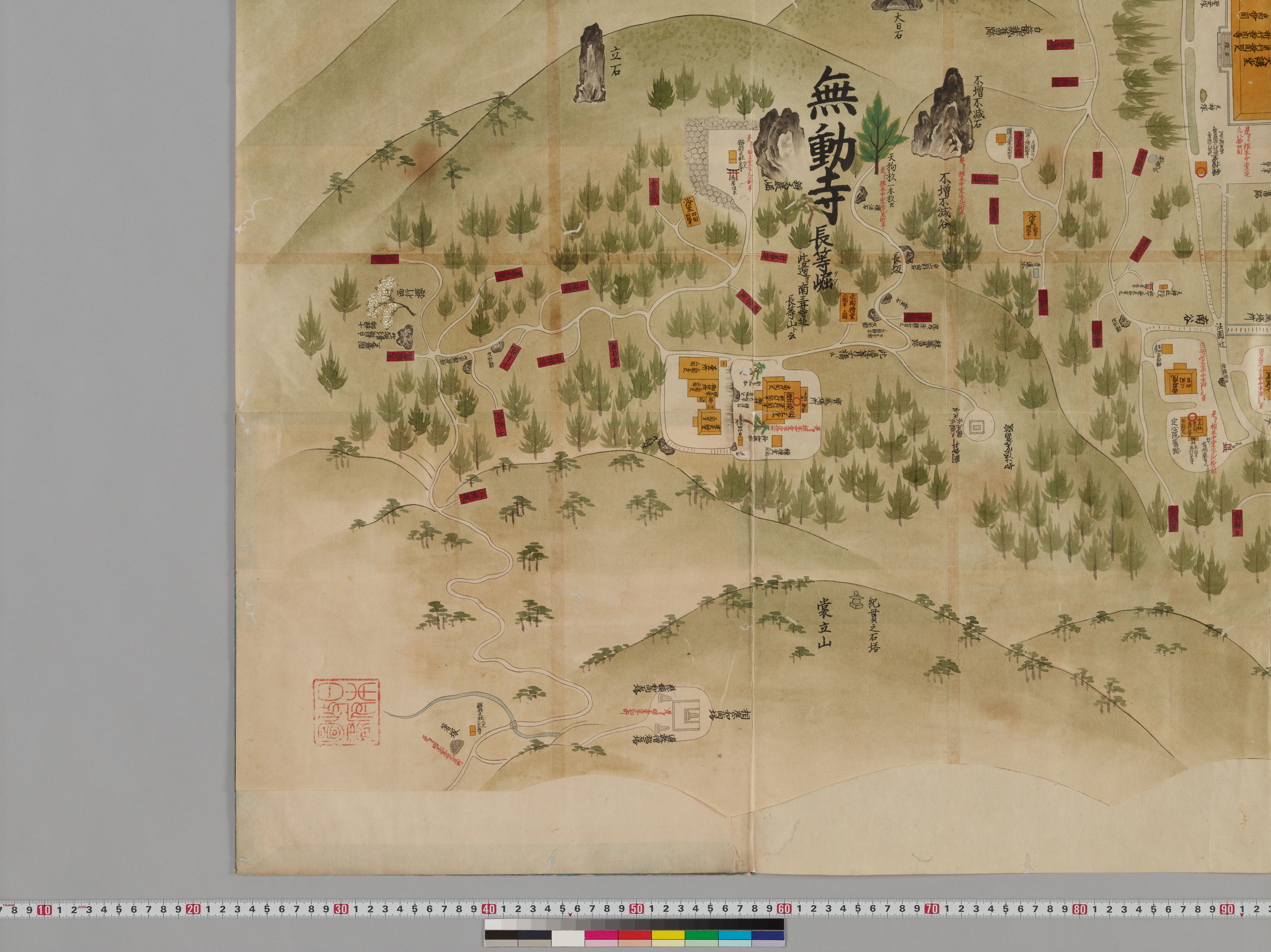
Sanmon-Santō Sakamoto Sōezu (part 4 of the 2nd volume)

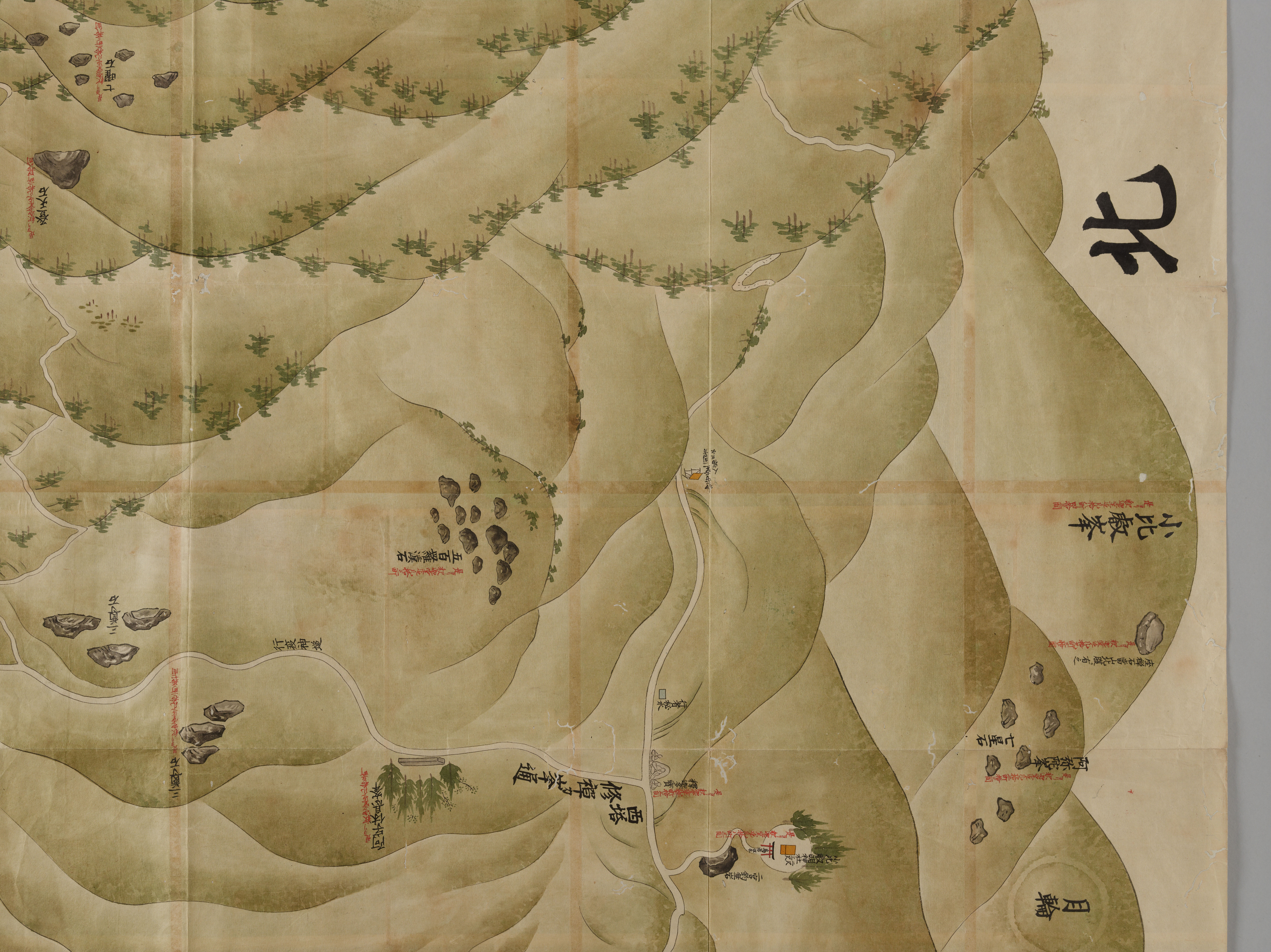
Sanmon-Santō Sakamoto Sōezu (part 5 of the 2nd volume)

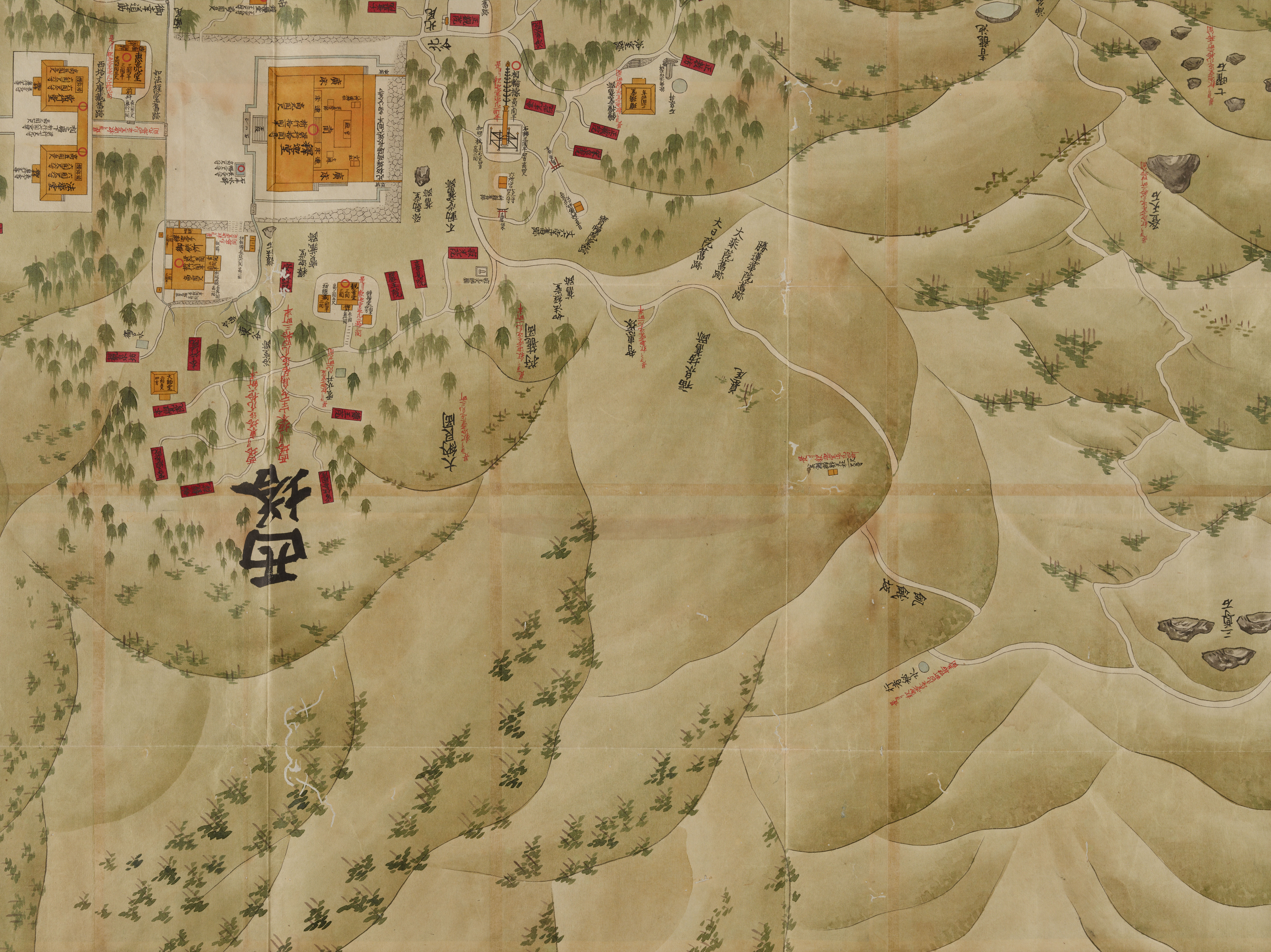
Sanmon-Santō Sakamoto Sōezu (part 6 of the 2nd volume)

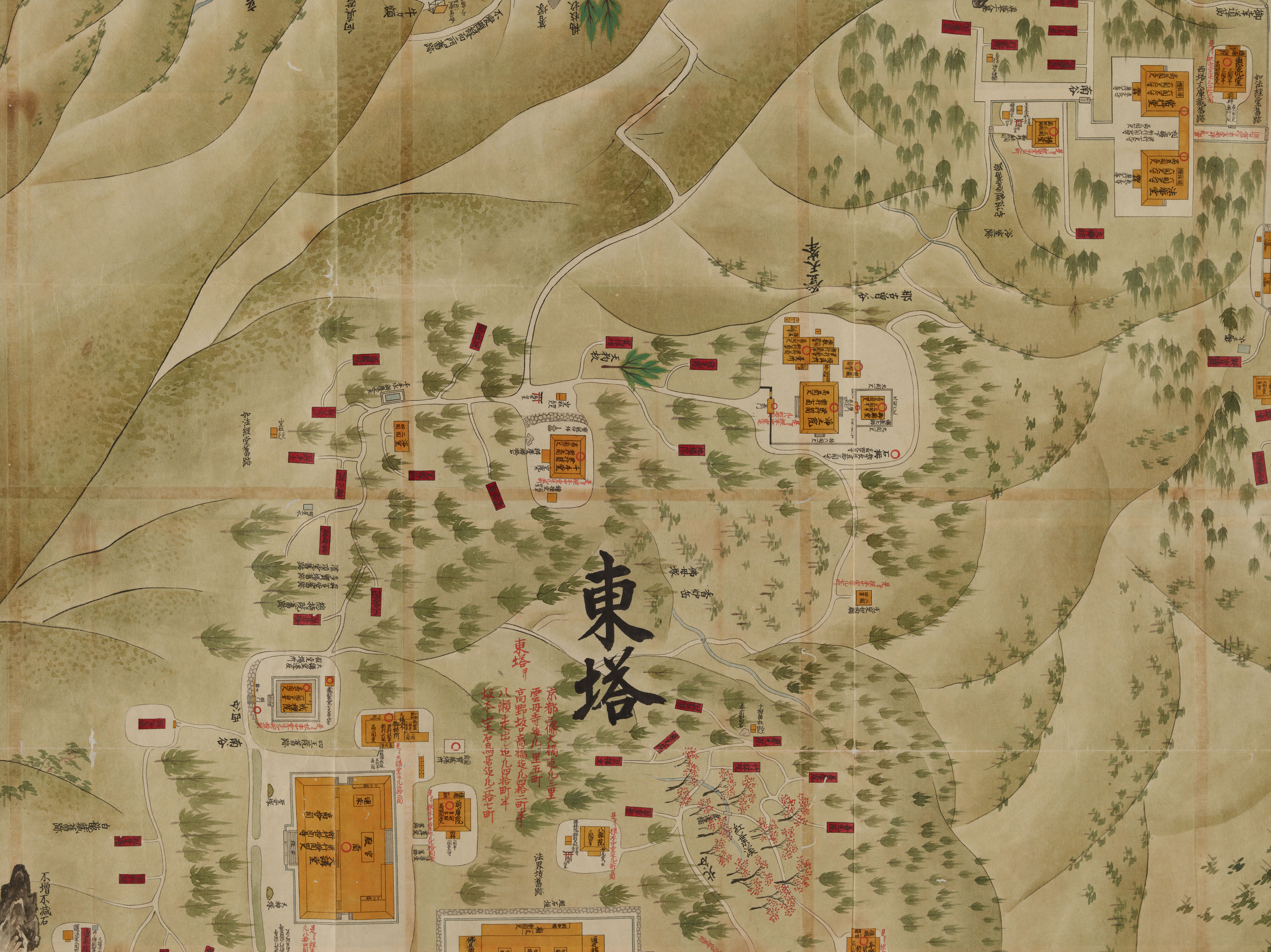
Sanmon-Santō Sakamoto Sōezu (part 7 of the 2nd volume)

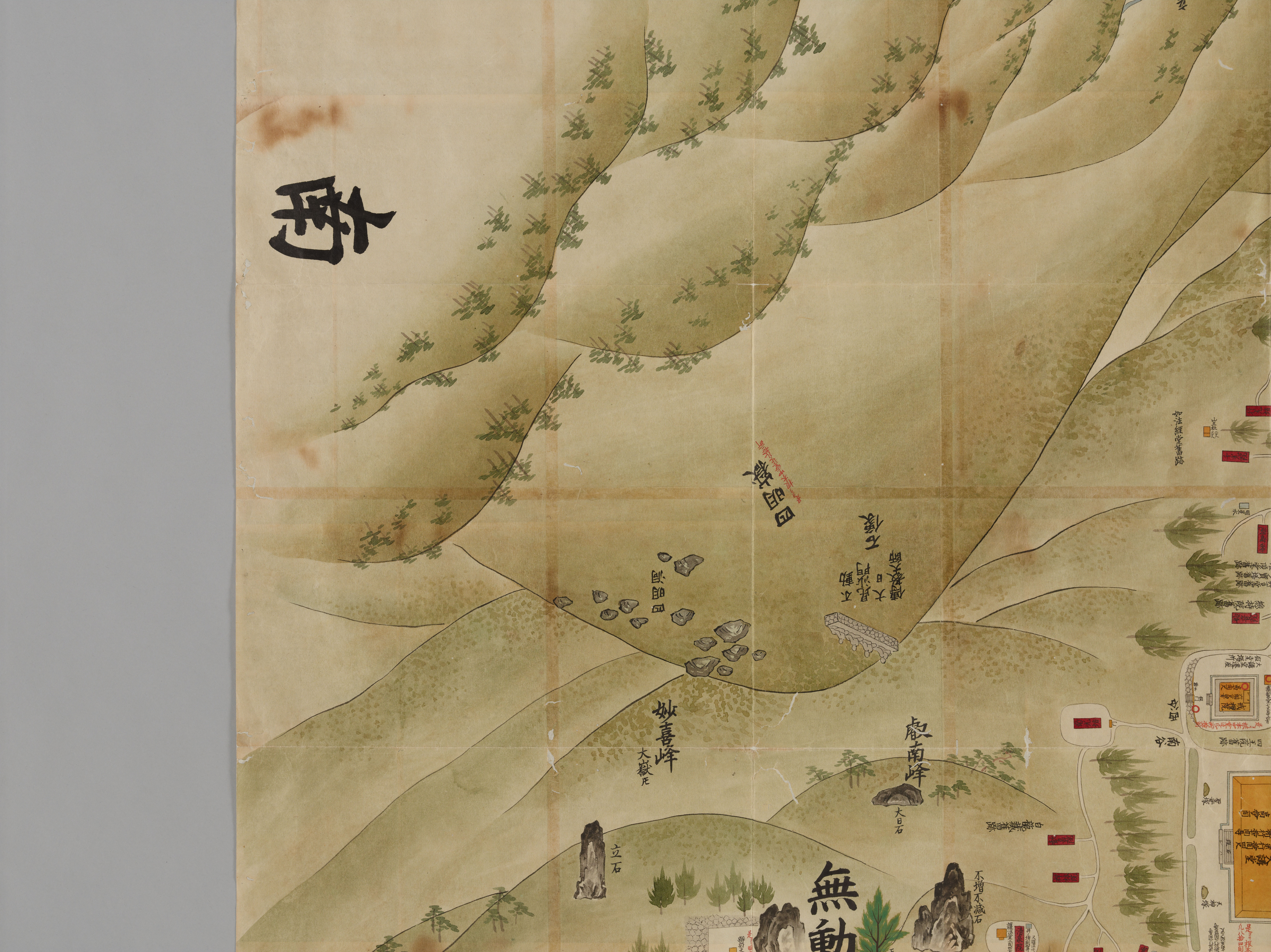
Sanmon-Santō Sakamoto Sōezu (part 8 of the 2nd volume)

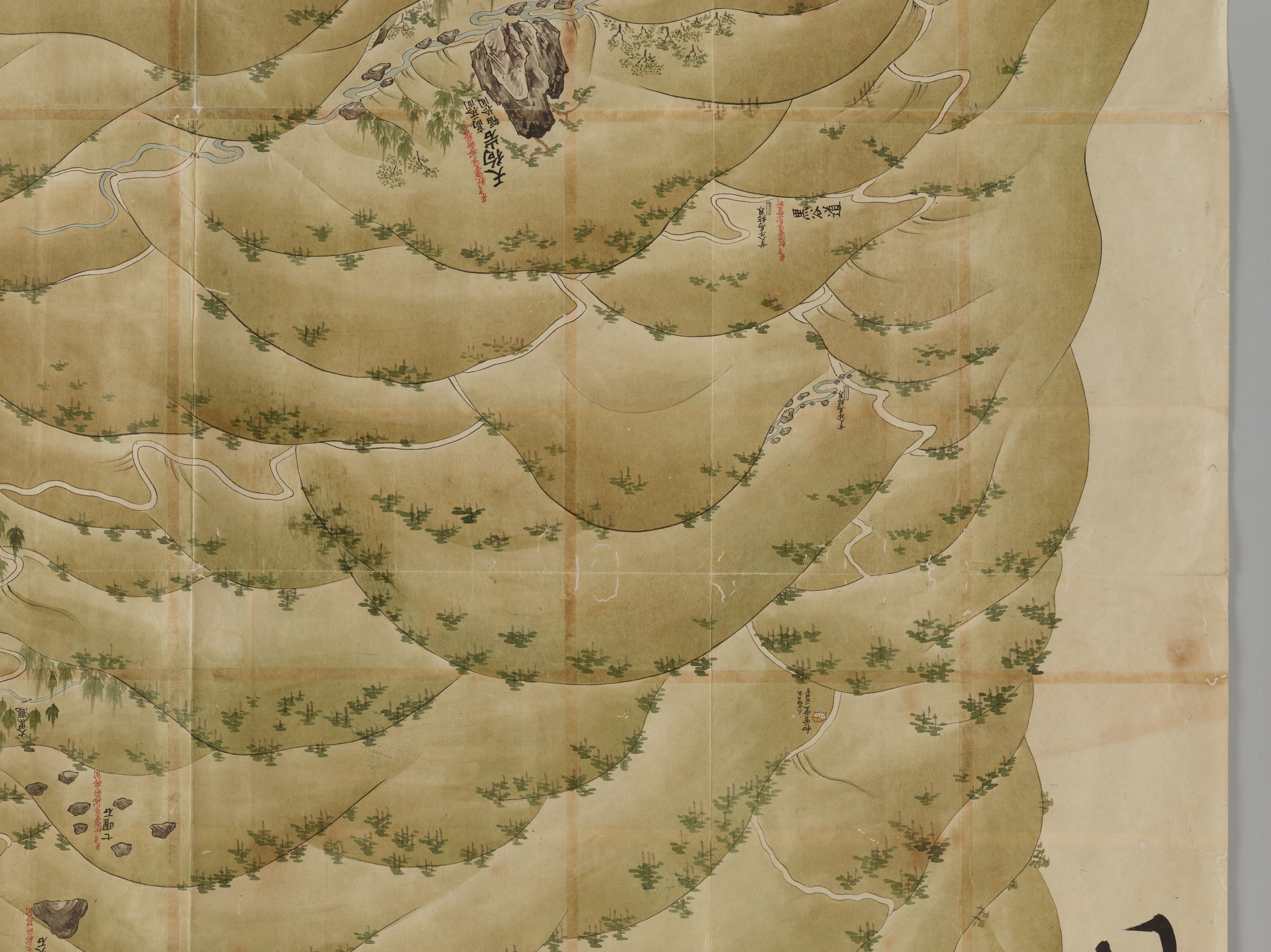
Sanmon-Santō Sakamoto Sōezu (part 9 of the 2nd volume)

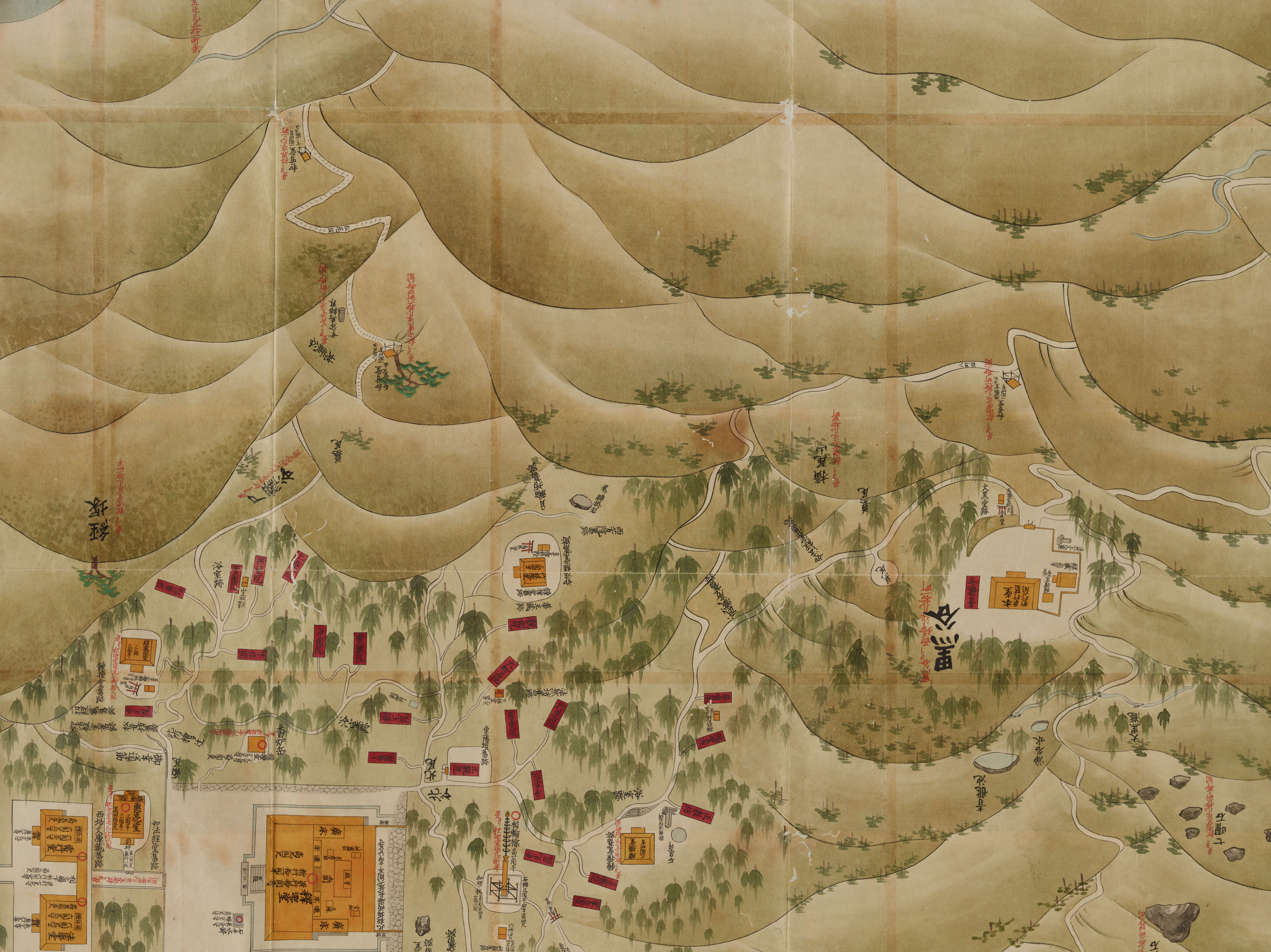
Sanmon-Santō Sakamoto Sōezu (part 10 of the 2nd volume)

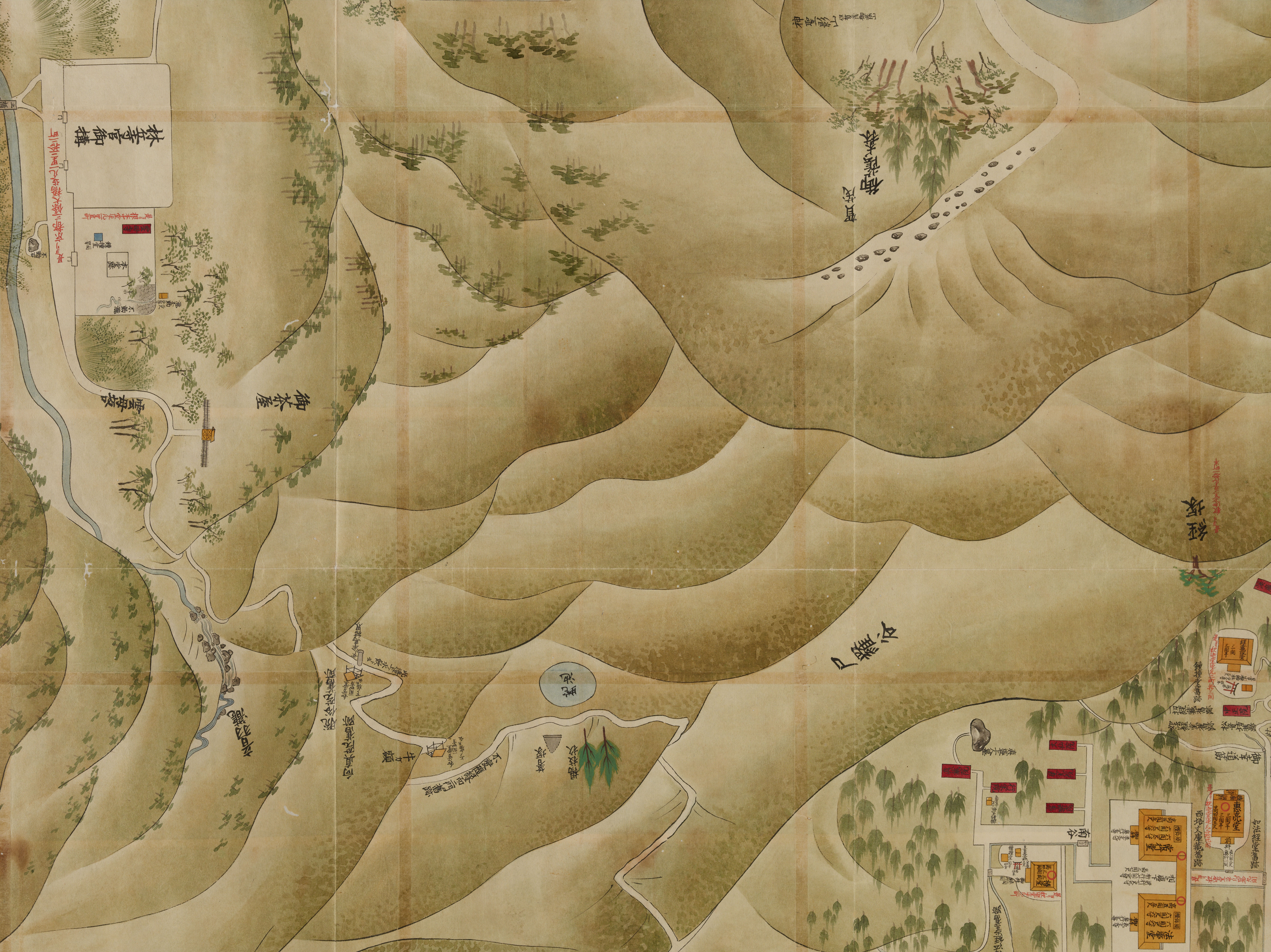
Sanmon-Santō Sakamoto Sōezu (part 11 of the 2nd volume)

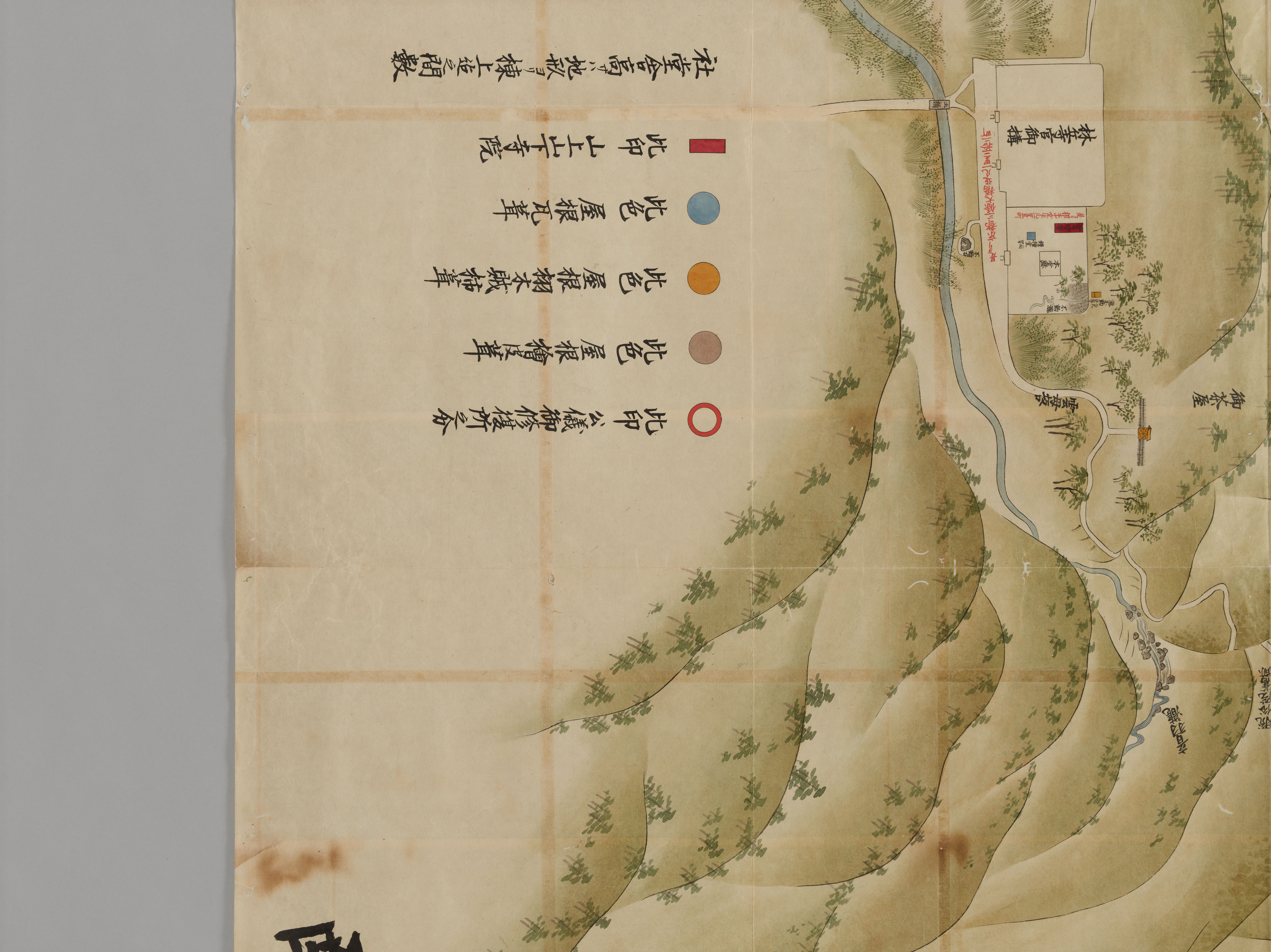
Sanmon-Santō Sakamoto Sōezu (part 12 of the 2nd volume)

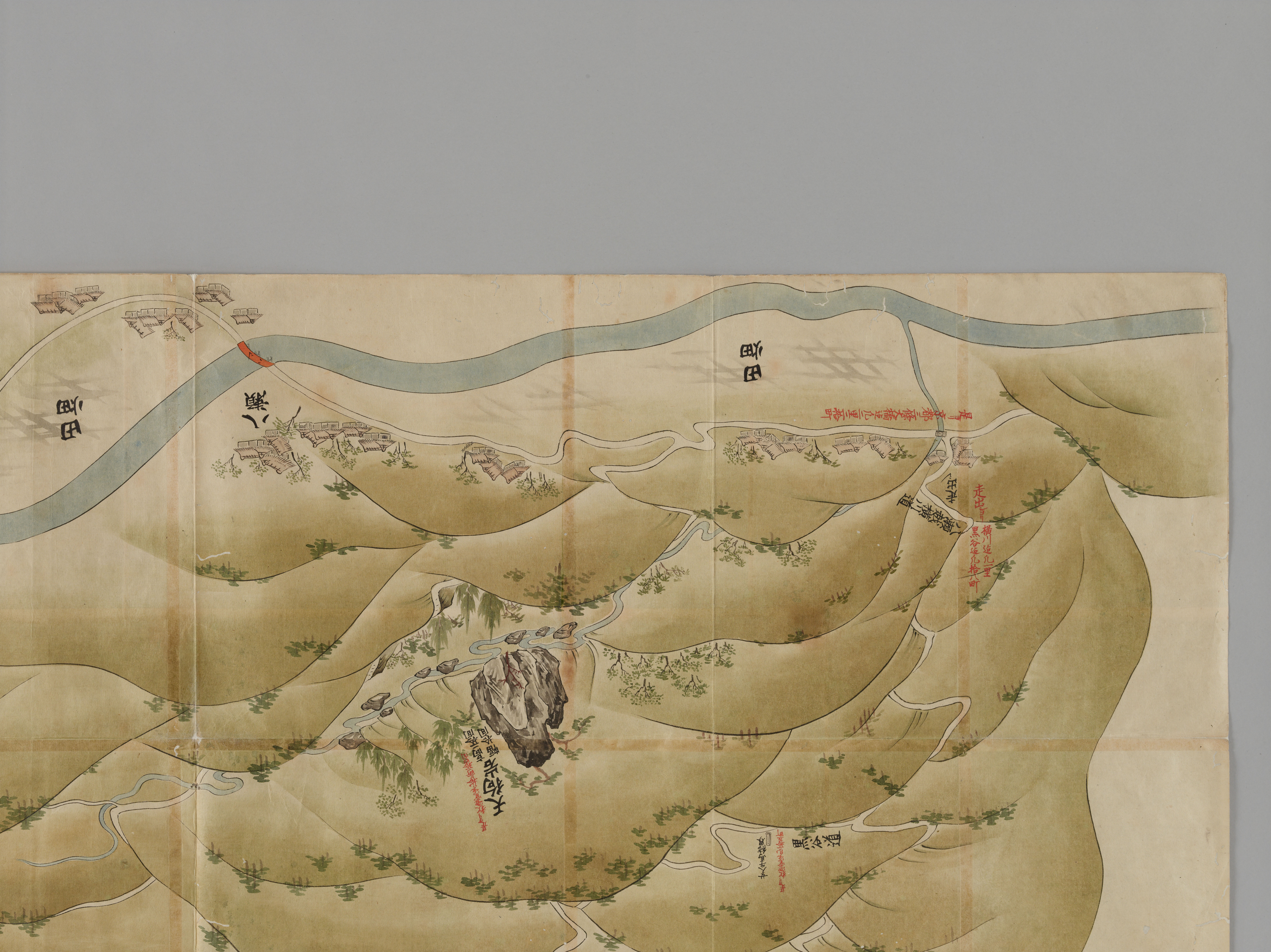
Sanmon-Santō Sakamoto Sōezu (part 13 of the 2nd volume)

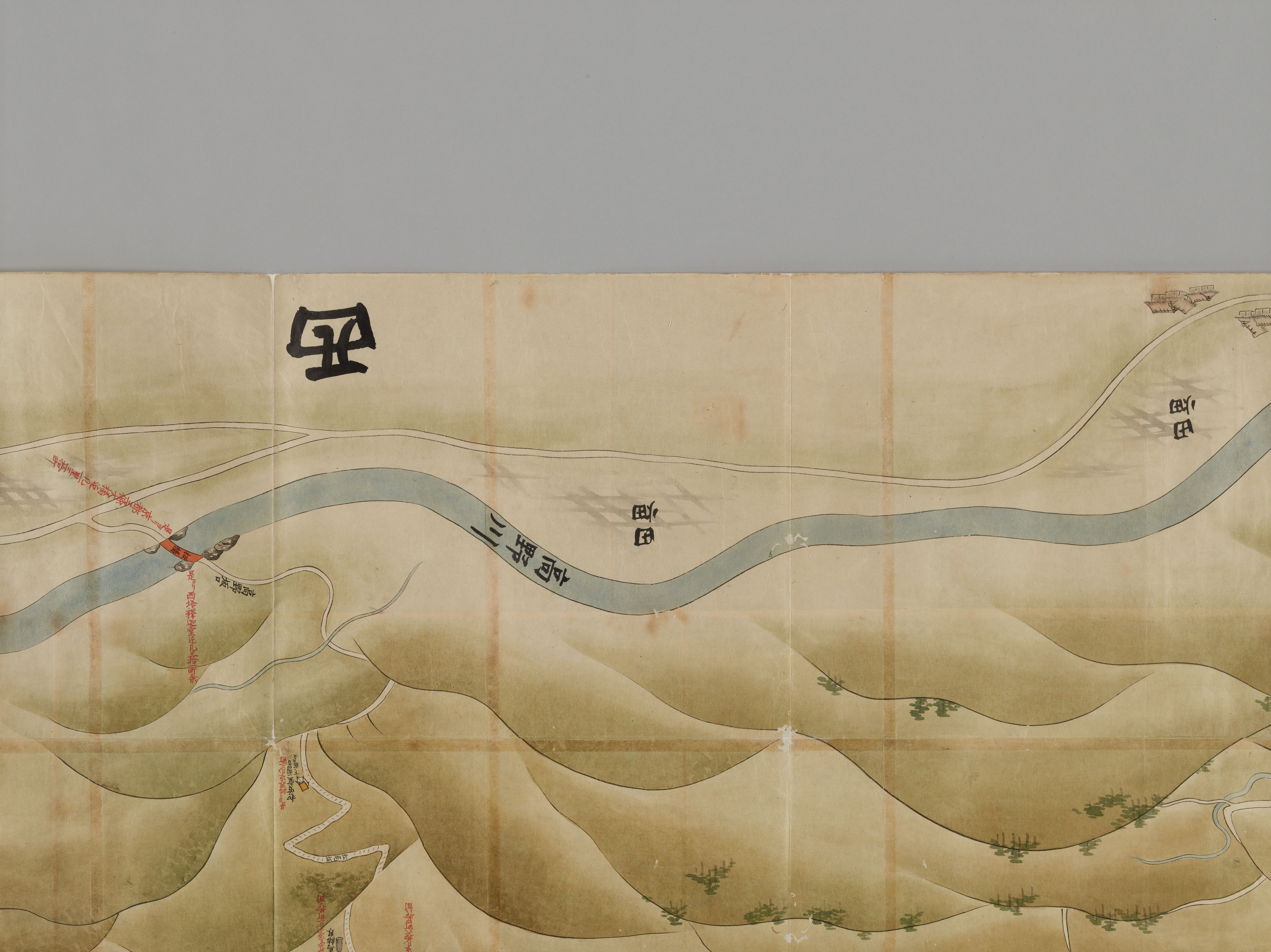
Sanmon-Santō Sakamoto Sōezu (part 14 of the 2nd volume)

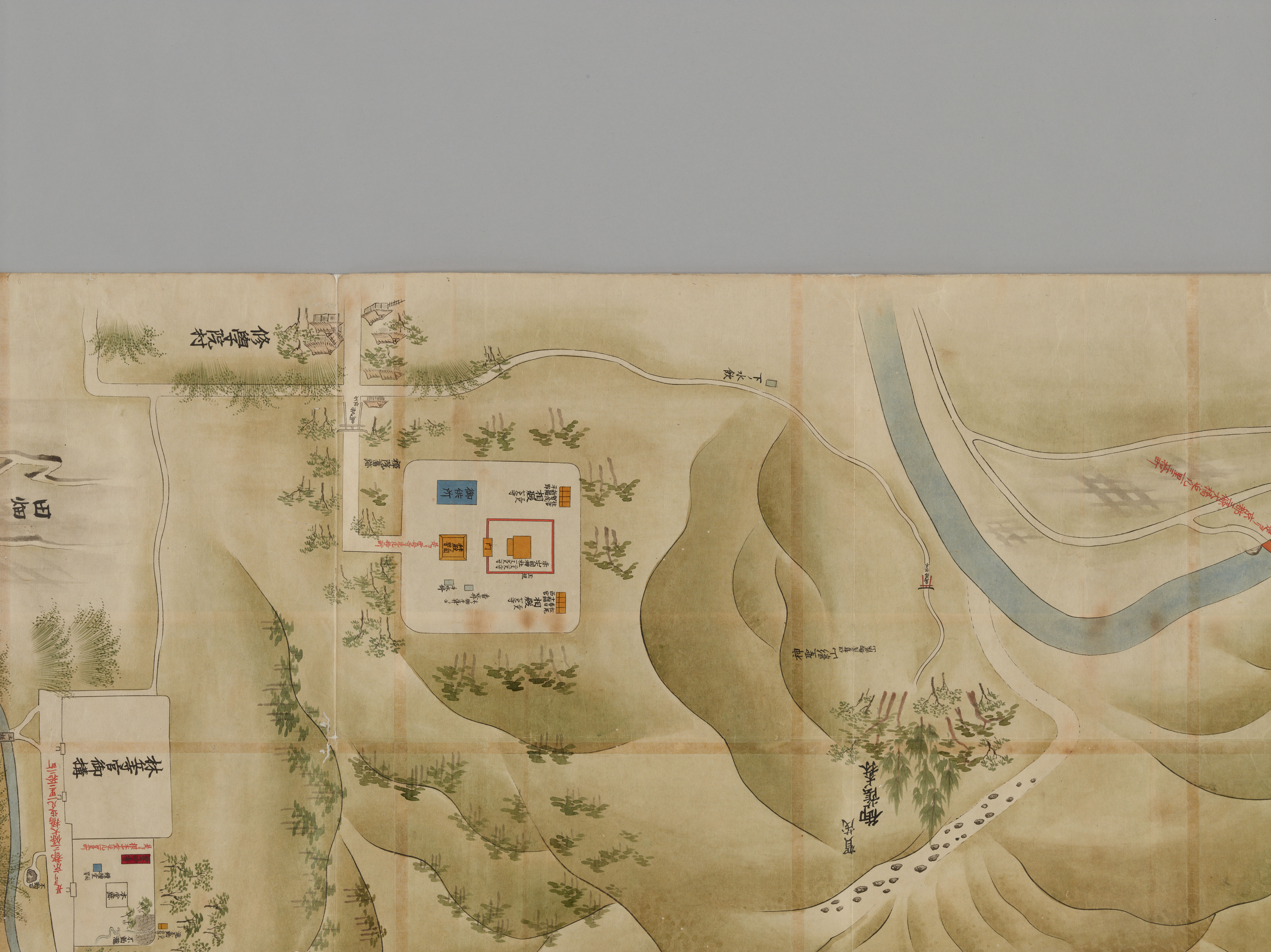
Sanmon-Santō Sakamoto Sōezu (part 15 of the 2nd volume)

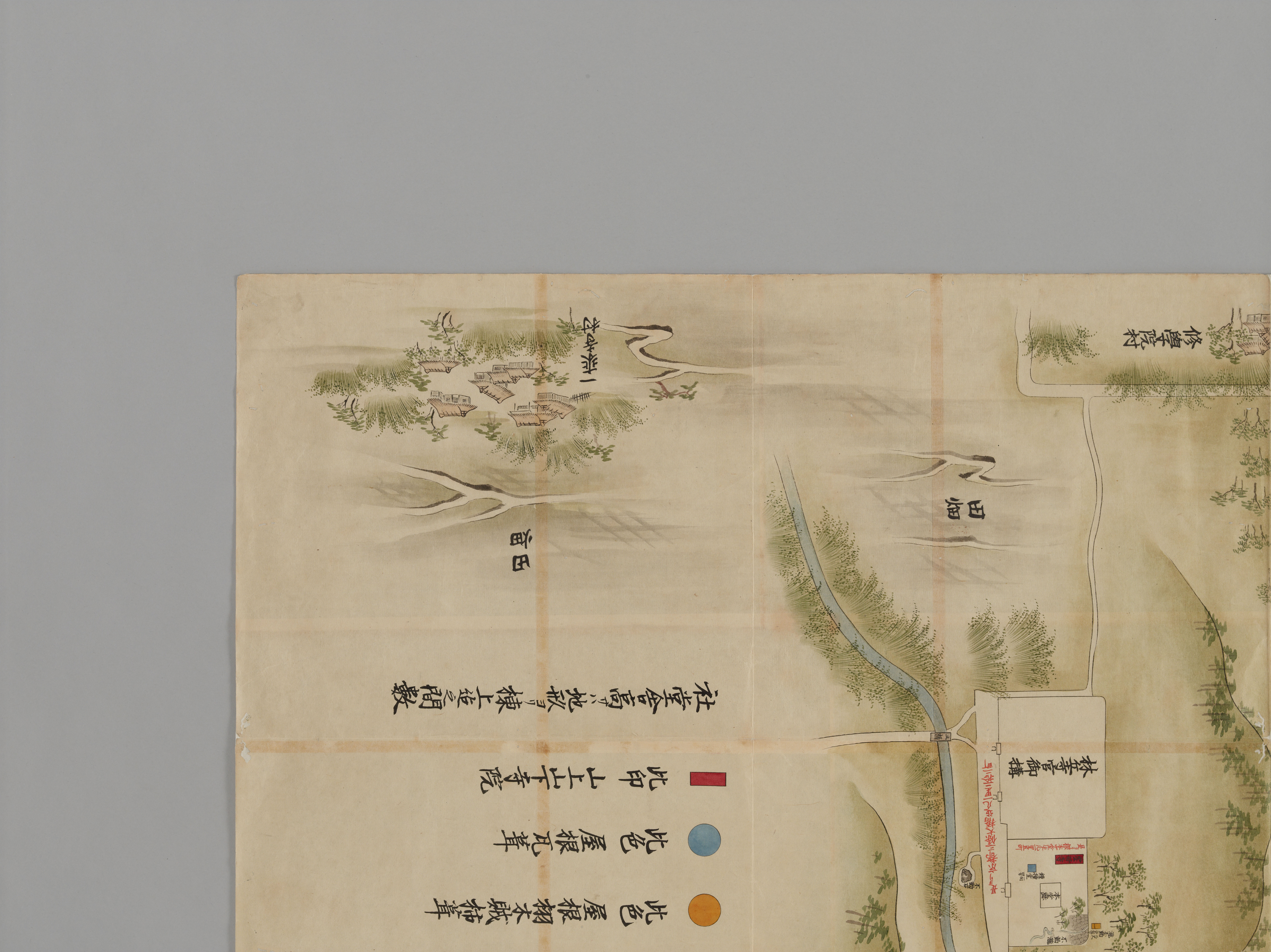
Sanmon-Santō Sakamoto Sōezu (part 16 of the 2nd volume)

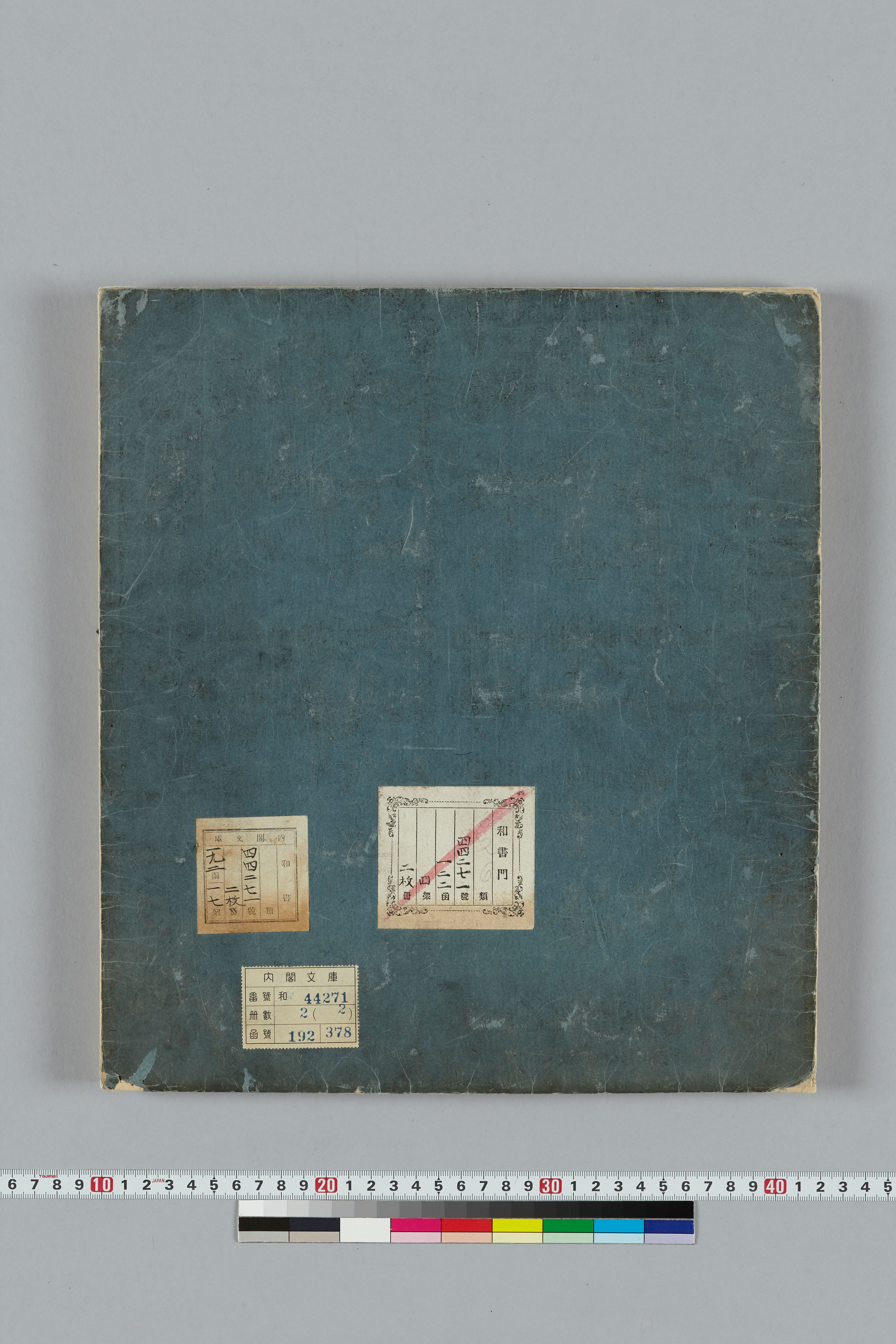
Sanmon-Santō Sakamoto Sōezu (back cover of the 2nd volume)

==== TIFF (.tif) ====
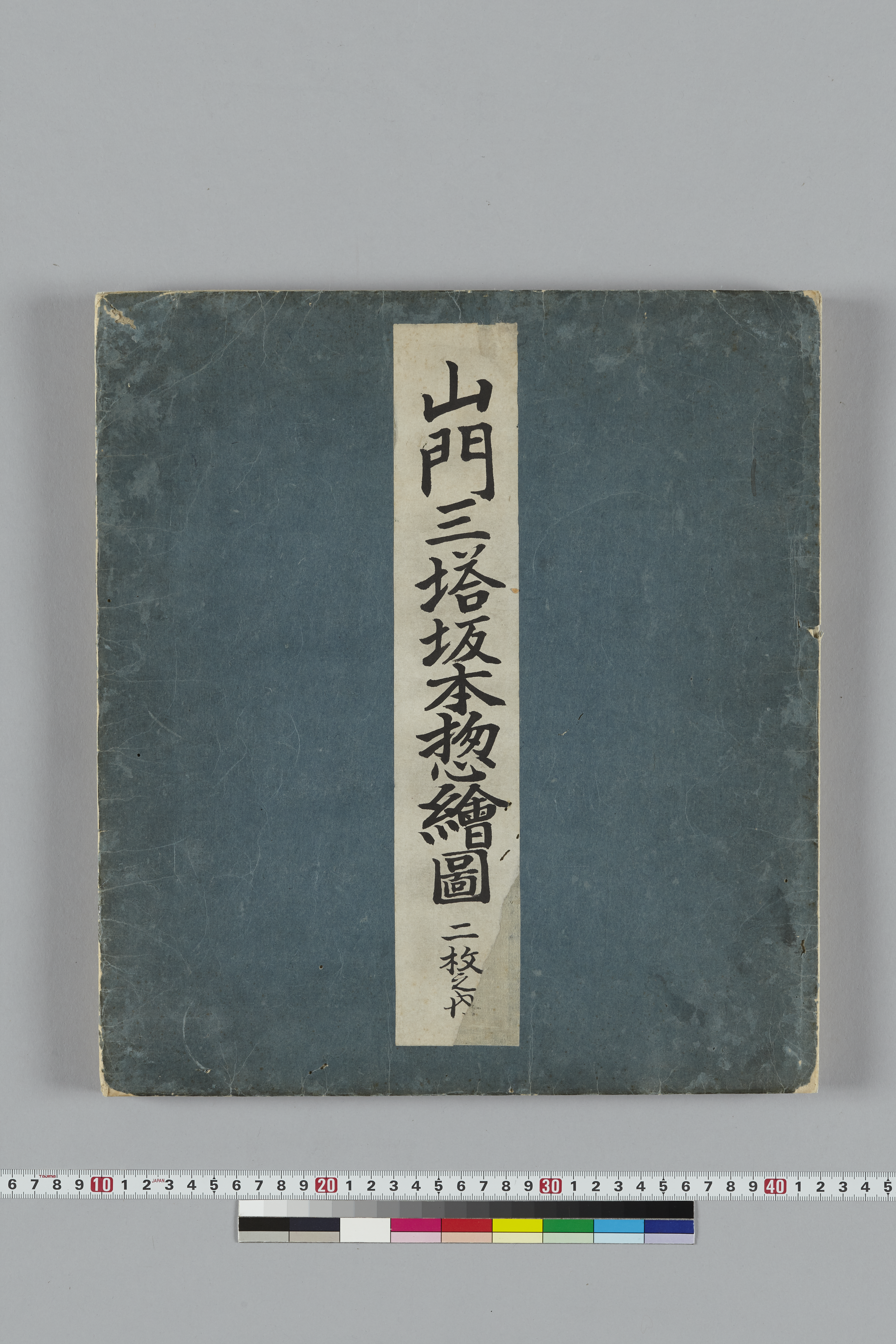
Sanmon-Santō Sakamoto Sōezu (front cover of the 2nd volume)

Sanmon-Santō Sakamoto Sōezu (part 1 of the 2nd volume)

Sanmon-Santō Sakamoto Sōezu (part 2 of the 2nd volume)

Sanmon-Santō Sakamoto Sōezu (part 3 of the 2nd volume)

Sanmon-Santō Sakamoto Sōezu (part 4 of the 2nd volume)

Sanmon-Santō Sakamoto Sōezu (part 5 of the 2nd volume)

Sanmon-Santō Sakamoto Sōezu (part 6 of the 2nd volume)

Sanmon-Santō Sakamoto Sōezu (part 7 of the 2nd volume)

Sanmon-Santō Sakamoto Sōezu (part 8 of the 2nd volume)

Sanmon-Santō Sakamoto Sōezu (part 9 of the 2nd volume)

Sanmon-Santō Sakamoto Sōezu (part 10 of the 2nd volume)

Sanmon-Santō Sakamoto Sōezu (part 11 of the 2nd volume)

Sanmon-Santō Sakamoto Sōezu (part 12 of the 2nd volume)

Sanmon-Santō Sakamoto Sōezu (part 13 of the 2nd volume)

Sanmon-Santō Sakamoto Sōezu (part 14 of the 2nd volume)

Sanmon-Santō Sakamoto Sōezu (part 15 of the 2nd volume)

Sanmon-Santō Sakamoto Sōezu (part 16 of the 2nd volume)

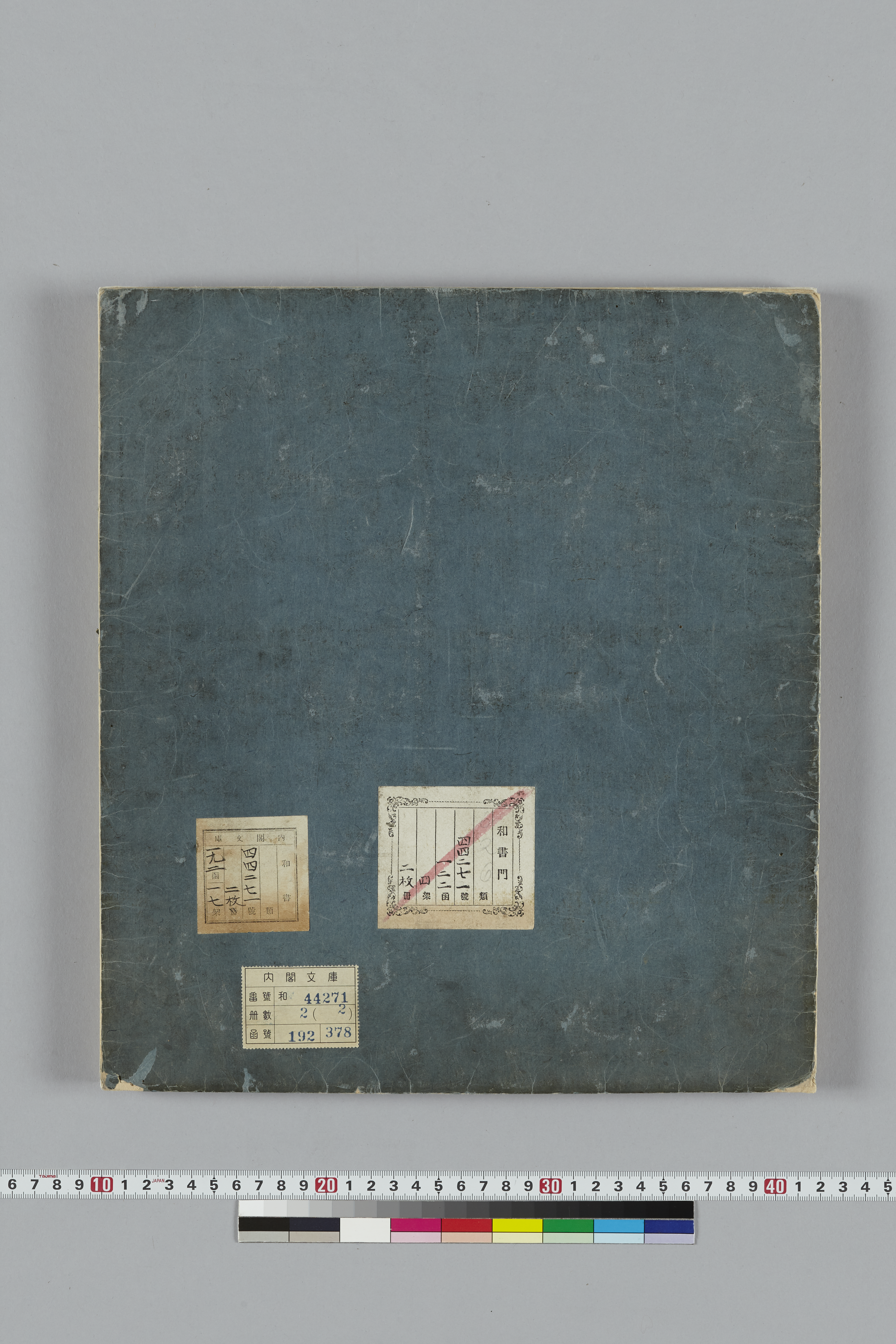
Sanmon-Santō Sakamoto Sōezu (back cover of the 2nd volume)
