= Tendai =

School of Mahayana Buddhism in Japan

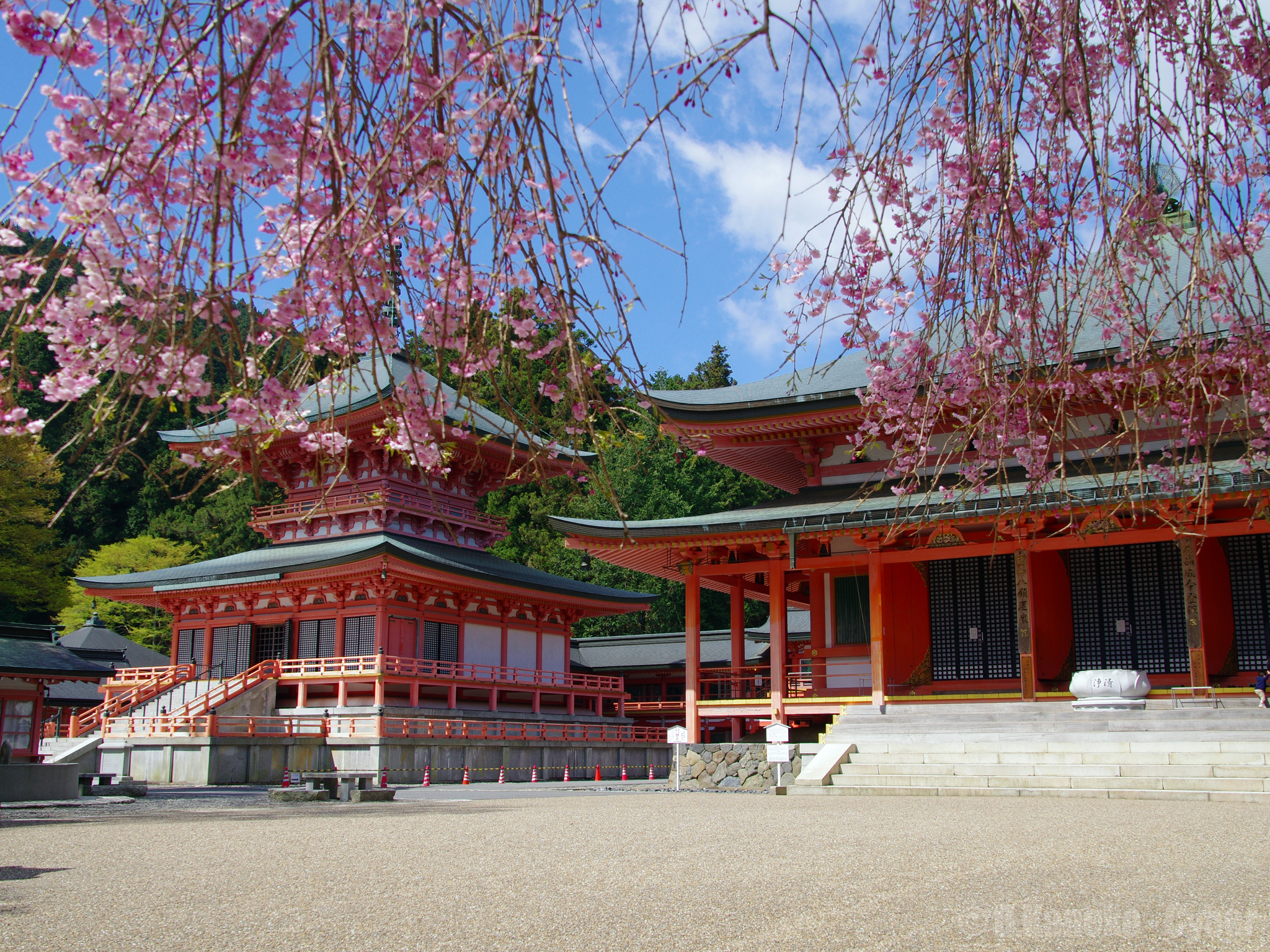
Enryaku-ji, the head temple of Tendai at Mount Hiei

Tendai (天台宗, Tendai-shū), also known as the Tendai Dharma Flower School (天台法華宗, Tendai hokke shū, sometimes just Hokkeshū), is a Mahāyāna Buddhist tradition with significant esoteric elements that was officially established in Japan in 806 by the Japanese monk Saichō. The Tendai school, which has been based on Mount Hiei since its inception, rose to prominence during the Heian period (794–1185). It gradually eclipsed the powerful Hossō school and competed with the rival Shingon school to become the most influential sect at the Imperial court.

By the Kamakura period (1185–1333), Tendai had become one of the dominant forms of Japanese Buddhism, with numerous temples and vast landholdings. During the Kamakura period, various monks left Tendai to found new Buddhist schools such as Jōdo-shū, Jōdo Shinshū, Nichiren-shū and Sōtō Zen. The destruction of the head temple of Enryaku-ji by Oda Nobunaga in 1571, as well as the geographic shift of the capital away from Kyoto to Edo, ended Tendai's dominance, though it remained influential.

In Chinese and Japanese, its name is identical to Tiantai (meaning "Celestial Platform"), its parent Chinese Buddhist tradition. Both traditions emphasize the importance of the Lotus Sutra and revere the teachings of the Tiantai patriarchs, especially Zhiyi. In English, the Japanese romanization Tendai is used to refer specifically to the Japanese school. According to Hazama Jikō, the main characteristic of Tendai is its comprehensive and universalist spirit, which is based on the "One Great Perfect Teaching", the idea that "all the teachings of the Buddha are ultimately without contradiction and can be unified in one comprehensive and perfect system."

Other unique elements include an exclusive use of the bodhisattva precepts for ordination (without the Pratimokṣa), a practice tradition based on the "Four Integrated Schools": (Shikan (meditation), Pure Land, Tantra and Precepts), and an emphasis on the study of Chinese Esoteric Buddhist sources. David W. Chappell sees Tendai as "the most comprehensive and diversified" Buddhist tradition which provides a religious framework that is "suited to adapt to other cultures, to evolve new practices, and to universalize Buddhism."

== History ==
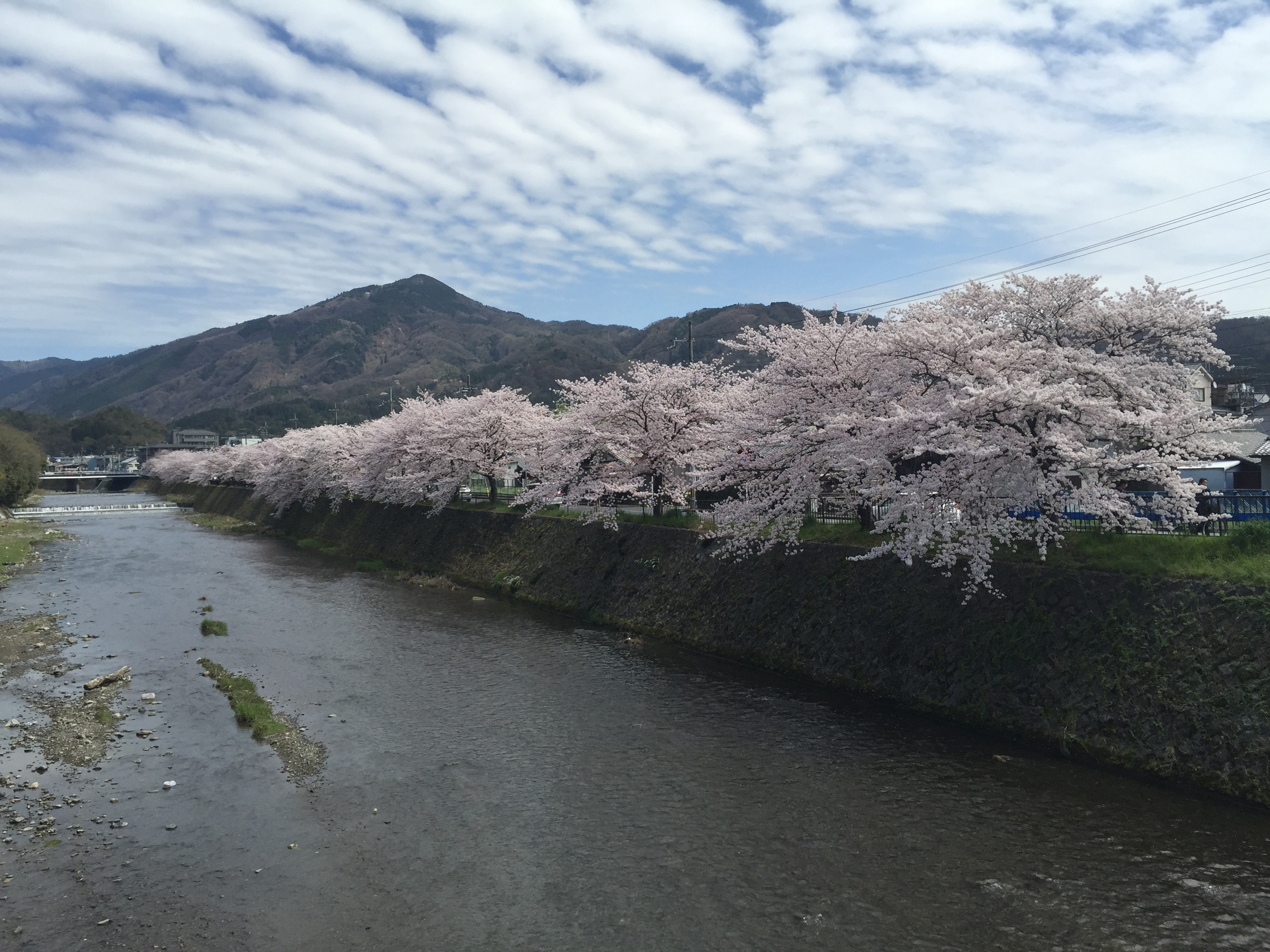
Mount Hiei in Spring from Umahashi over the Takano river

=== Foundation by Saichō ===
The teachings of the Chinese Tiantai school founded by Zhiyi (538–597 CE) had been brought to Japan as early as 754 by Jianzhen (Jp. Ganjin). However, Tiantai teachings did not take root in a formal organized school until generations later, when the monk Saichō (767–822) joined the Japanese missions to Imperial China in 804 and founded Enryaku-ji on Mount Hiei. The future founder of Shingon Buddhism, Kūkai, also travelled on the same mission; however, the two were on separate ships, and there is no evidence they met in this period.

From the city of Ningbo (then called 明州 Míngzhōu), Saichō was introduced by the governor to Dàosuì, the seventh Tiantai patriarch, and later he journeyed to Tiantai Mountain for further study. After receiving teachings and initiations on Chan, Precepts and Chinese Esoteric Buddhism, Saichō devoted much of his time to making accurate copies of Tiantai texts and studying under Dàosuì. By the sixth month of 805, Saichō had returned to Japan along with the official mission to China. Saichō was also influenced by his study of Huayan (Jp. Kegon) philosophy under Gyōhyō (行表) (720–797), and this was his initial training before going to China.

Because of the Japanese imperial court's interest in Tiantai as well as esoteric Buddhism, Saichō quickly rose in prominence upon his return. He was asked by Emperor Kanmu (735–806) to perform various esoteric rituals. Saichō also sought recognition from the Emperor for a new, independent Tendai school in Japan. Because the emperor sought to reduce the power of the Hosso sect, he granted this request, but with the stipulation that the new Tendai school would have two programs: one for esoteric Buddhism and one for exoteric Buddhist practice.

The new Tendai school was therefore based on a combination of Zhiyi's doctrinal and meditative system with esoteric practice and texts. Tendai learning at Mount Hiei traditionally followed two curricula:

- Exoteric practice (止觀業, Shikan-gō), mainly based on Zhiyi's Mohe Zhiguan
- Esoteric Buddhism (遮那業, Shana-gō) , focused on the Vairocanābhisaṃbodhi Sūtra and other tantric works

However, Emperor Kanmu died shortly thereafter, and Saichō was not allocated any ordinands until 809 with the reign of Emperor Saga. Saichō's choice of establishing his community at Mount Hiei also proved fortuitous because it was located at the northeast of the new capital of Kyoto and thus was auspicious in terms of feng shui (geomancy) as the city's protector.

==== Disagreements with other schools ====
The remainder of Saichō's life was spent in heated debates with notable Yogācārins, particularly Tokuitsu, and maintaining an increasingly strained relationship with Kūkai, from whom he received initiations to broaden his understanding of esoteric Buddhism. The debates with Yogācārins were primarily centered on the doctrine of Ekayāna, 'the One School', found in the Lotus Sutra, which the Yogācārins saw as not being an ultimate teaching. This was known as the "Ekayāna–Three Vehicle debate" (San-Itsu Gon-Jitsu Ronsō), and it had a great influence on Japanese Buddhism.

Saichō also studied Mikkyō, esoteric practices, under Kūkai, the founder of Shingon Buddhism. Saichō borrowed esoteric texts from Kūkai for copying, and they also exchanged letters for some time. However, they eventually had a falling out around 816 over their understanding of esotericism. This was because Saichō attempted to integrate Mikkyō into his broader Tendai schema, seeing it as equal to the Tendai's Lotus Sutra teaching. Saichō would write that Tendai and Mikkyo "interfuse with one another" and that "there should be no such thing as preferring one to the other." Kūkai saw Mikkyō as different from and fully superior to exoteric practices (顕教, kengyo) and was concerned that Saichō had not fully finished his Mikkyō training under him.

Saichō's efforts were also devoted to developing a Mahāyāna ordination platform that required the Bodhisattva Precepts of the Brahmajala Sutra only, and not the pratimokṣa of the Dharmaguptaka vinaya, which was traditionally used in East Asian monasticism. Saichō saw the precepts of the so-called Hinayana ('Small Vehicle') as no longer necessary for Tendai's ordination platform. Despite this, he also argued that vinaya lineages should continue and did not seek to abolish it. Nevertheless, he sought to establish a new kind of ordination framework based on his Tendai vision. His ideas were attacked as unorthodox by the more traditional Nara schools, as well as the Sōgō (the Office of Monastic Affairs), and they were not initially approved by the Imperial Court. Saichō wrote the Kenkairon, "On promoting the Mahāyāna precepts" (顕戒論), to respond to their criticisms. By the time that Saichō died in 822, his yearly petition was finally granted, and the traditional "Four-Part Vinaya" (Chinese: 四分律) was replaced by the Tendai Bodhisattva Precepts as the basis for Tendai ordination.

Saichō's petitions to the court also outlined a more engaged vision for monastic service. Monks skilled in physical labor were to be sent to local government offices to build dikes, roads, and schools, while those versed in doctrine and classical Chinese were to establish educational institutions in provincial villages.

=== Development after Saichō ===
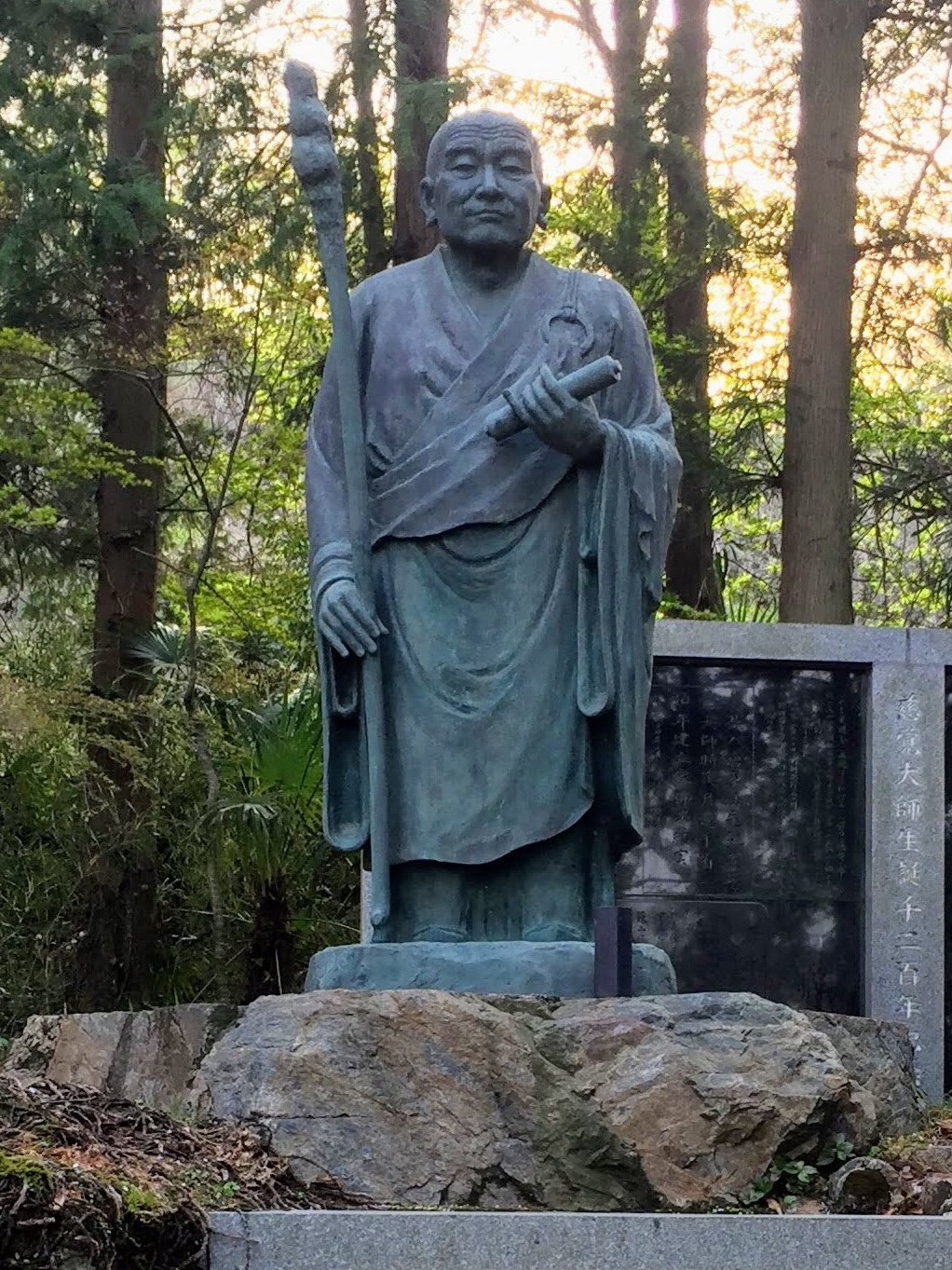
A statue of Ennin, an important disciple of Saicho

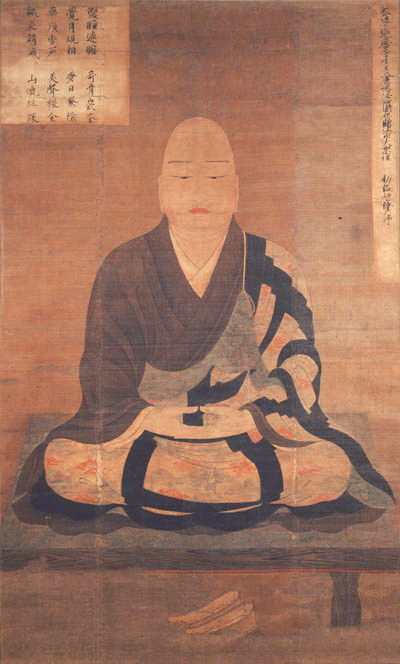
Chishō Daishi Enchin (814–891)

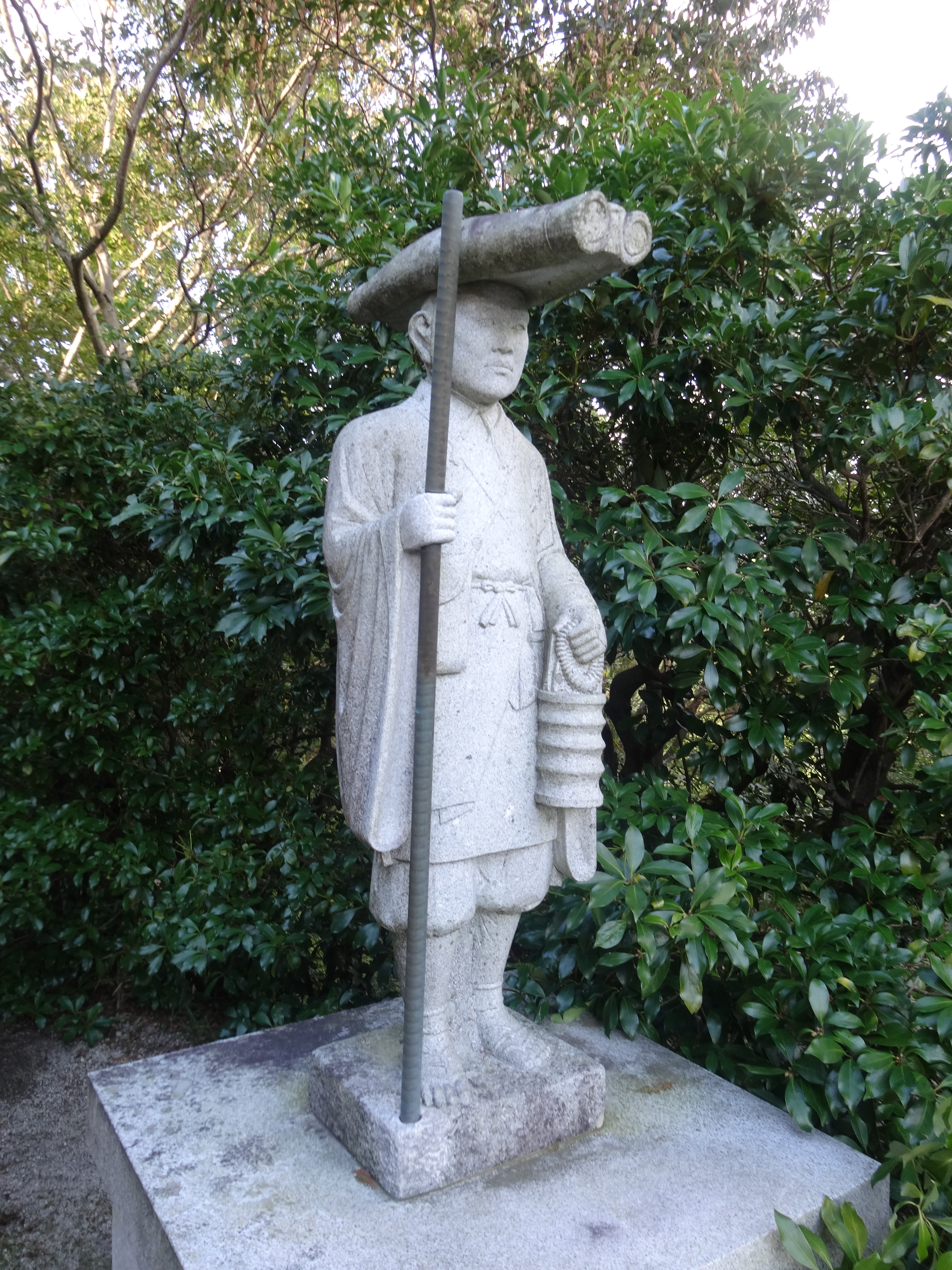
Statue of Konryū Daishi Sōō (831–918), the creator of the practice of circumambulating Mt. Hiei, called kaihōgyō (回峰行 "circling the mountain")

Seven days after Saichō died, the Imperial Court granted permission for the new Tendai Bodhisattva Precept ordination process which allowed Tendai to use an ordination platform separate from the powerful schools in Nara. Gishin, Saichō's disciple and the first "zasu" (座主; "Head of the Tendai Order"), presided over the first allotted ordinations in 827. The appointments of the zasu typically only lasted a few years, and therefore among the same generation of disciples, a number could be appointed zasu in one's lifetime. After Gishin, the next zasu of the Tendai school were: Enchō (円澄), Ennin 慈覺大師圓仁 (794–864), An'e (安慧), Enchin 智證大師圓珍 (814–891), Yuishu (惟首), Yūken (猷憲) and Kōsai (康済).

By 864, Tendai monks were now appointed to the powerful sōgō (僧綱; "Office of Monastic Affairs") with the naming of An'e (安慧) as the provisional vinaya master. Other examples include Enchin's appointment to the Office of Monastic Affairs in 883. While Saichō had opposed the Office during his lifetime, within a few generations his disciples were now gifted with positions in the Office by the Imperial Family, indicating its rise to prominence.

=== Development of Tendai practice traditions ===
Philosophically, the Tendai school did not deviate substantially from the beliefs developed by the Tiantai school in China. However, Saichō had also transmitted numerous teachings from China that were not exclusively Tiantai but also included Zen, Pure Land Buddhism, Mikkyō, and Kyeyul ('Vinaya school') elements. Saichō's successors, such as Ennin, Enchin and Annen contributed to the development of the Tendai school through their significant scholastic work and promotion of esoteric practices and texts.

After Saichō, the Tendai order underwent efforts to deepen its understanding of teachings collected by the founder, particularly esoteric Buddhism. Saichō had only received initiation in the Vajra Realm Mandala, and since the rival Shingon school under Kūkai had received deeper training, early Tendai monks felt it necessary to return to China for further initiation and instruction. Saichō's disciple Ennin went to China in 838 and returned ten years later with a more thorough understanding of esoteric, Pure Land, and Tiantai teachings. Ennin brought important esoteric texts and initiation lineages, such as the Susiddhikāra-sūtra, the Vairocanābhisaṃbodhi Sūtra and Vajraśekhara-sūtra.

However, in later years, this range of teachings began to give rise to sub-schools within Tendai. By the time of Ryōgen, there were two distinct groups on Mt. Hiei, the Jimon and Sanmon: the Sammon-ha "Mountain Group" followed Ennin and the Jimon-ha "Temple Group" followed Enchin.

Konryū Daishi Sōō (831–918), a student of Ennin, is another influential figure in Tendai. He is known for developing the ascetic practice of circumambulating Mount Hiei and living and practicing in the remote wilderness. This practice, which became associated with Acala (Fudō Myōō) and Sōō's hermitage at Mudō-ji, became quite influential in Tendai. A more elaborate and systematized practice based on Sōō's simple mountain asceticism developed over time, and came to be called kaihōgyō. This remains an important part of Tendai Buddhism today.

Annen (841–902?) is one of the most important post-Saichō Tendai thinkers. He wrote around a hundred works on Tendai doctrine and practice. According to Annen's theory of "the four ones" (四一教判, shiichi kyōhan), all Buddhas are ultimately a single Buddha, all temporal moments are one moment, all pure lands are also just one pure land, and all teachings are interfused into one teaching.

According to Lucia Dolce, Annen "systematized earlier and contemporary doctrines elaborated in both streams of Japanese esoteric Buddhism, Tōmitsu (i.e., Shingon) and Taimitsu (Tendai)", "critically reinterpreted Kūkai's thought, offering new understandings of crucial esoteric concepts and rituals", and he also "elaborated theories that were to become emblematic of Japanese Buddhism, such as the realization of buddhahood by grasses and trees (sōmoku jōbutsu)," as well as original enlightenment thought.

These various post-Saichō Tendai figures also developed the Tendai doctrine of "the identity of the purport of Perfect and Esoteric teachings" (enmitsu itchi 円密一致), which, according to Ōkubo Ryōshun, "refers to the harmony and agreement between the Perfect teachings of the Lotus Sutra and Esoteric Buddhism."

=== Later Heian ===
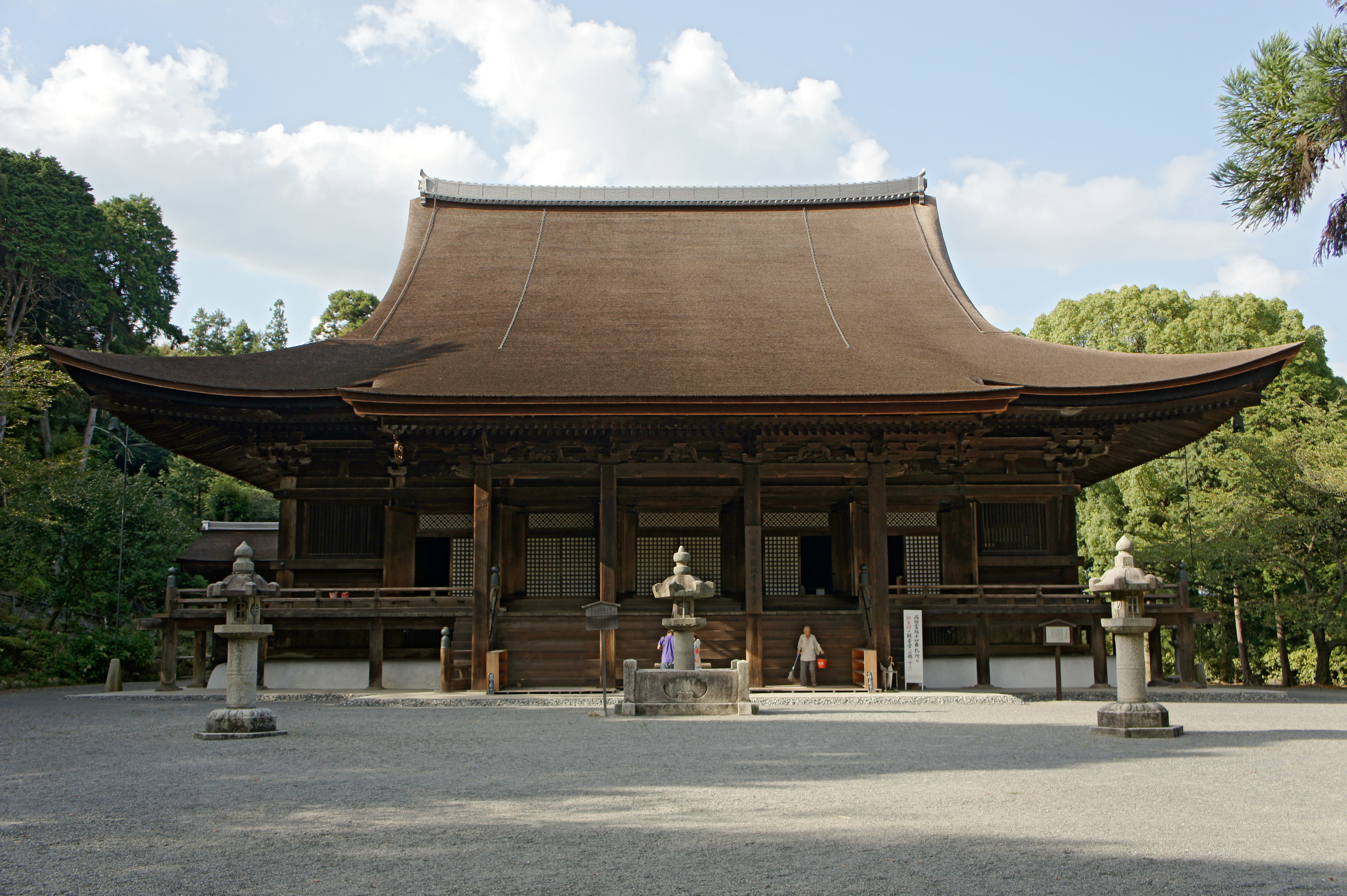
Golden Hall of Onjōji, also known as Mii-dera, a National Treasure of Japan

During the later Heian period, Ryōgen 良源 (912–985) was an influential figure. He was the 18th abbot of Enryaku-ji, the head temple on Mount Hiei, and was a politician with close ties to the Fujiwara clan, as well as a learned scholar. Due to his influence, the Tendai school became the dominant Buddhist tradition at the imperial court in Kyoto. Due to Ryōgen's influence, Fujiwara family members also came to occupy important positions at Tendai temples. Ryōgen is also said to have hired an army to protect Mt. Hiei, and some scholars see him as contributing the development of the warrior monk phenomenon (sōhei). However, other scholars argue that warrior monks developed due to various social and political pressures, such as the decline of the imperial bureaucratic state, the rise of temple estates, and the rise of noblemen joining the clergy.

Whatever the case, the late Heian age also saw increased violence among Buddhist schools and temples (and among sub-schools within Tendai), with armed groups resorting to violence to resolve disputes between temples and sects. During this period, the main Tendai temples of Enryakuji and Onjōji resorted to armed violence against each other on more than one occasion.

Ryōgen's most influential disciples were Genshin (Eshin sōzu, 942-1017) and Kakuun (Danna sōzu, 957-1007). The lineages established by Genshin and Kakuun developed into two main sects within Tendai, the Eshin school and the Danna school respectively. According to Shōshin Ichishima,

Genshin's Eshin school espoused the doctrine of the original enlightenment, while Kakuun's Danna school espoused that of acquired enlightenment. The Eshinryū school used the ninth consciousness as the basis of meditation, whereas the Dannaryū used the sixth consciousness in the yogācāra consciousness [system]. The Eshinryū school valued oral transmission of doctrine and meditative insight, while Dannaryū emphasized doctrine and texts. The Eshinryū school favored the "origin teaching" (honmon), and the latter fourteen chapters of the Lotus Sūtra over the "trace teaching" (shakumon), the first fourteen chapters, while the Dannaryū school regarded both sections as equally important. These differences distinguish the two schools.

=== Tendai Pure Land ===
During the Heian period, Tendai Pure Land practice also developed into a significant and influential tradition. Early Pure Land Buddhism emphasized spiritual cultivation aimed at achieving birth in Amida Buddha's Pure Land at the time of death as well as the constantly walking samadhi taught in Zhiyi's Mohe Zhiguan, in which one would circumambulate a Buddha statue while meditating on the features of Amitabha. Chinese Pure Land chanting methods, such as Fazhao's five tone nenbutsu (go-e nembutsu, 五会念仏) were also adopted into the Tendai tradition by figures like Ennin.

In early Japanese Tendai Pure Land discourse, monks such as Zenyu and Senkan (918–984) promoted nenbutsu (chanting Amida Buddha's name) as the most viable kind of practice for the age of mappo (Dharma Decline). These figures presented the nenbutsu as an accessible method for entering the Tendai path, especially for those who felt incapable of advanced spiritual cultivation. This interpretation allowed Pure Land devotion to align with the broader Tendai tradition, reinforcing the belief that all beings possess the potential for buddhahood.

Genshin (942–1017), an influential student of Ryōgen, wrote the famous Ōjōyōshū (Essentials of Birth in the Pure Land), which influenced later Pure Land Japanese figures. His work built upon the foundational ideas established by earlier monks like Senkan, emphasizing nenbutsu practice as a viable and effective path toward enlightenment in the era of Dharma decline. Genshin would later become a key figure for later Japanese Pure Land teachers like Hōnen.

=== Kamakura Period (1185–1333) ===
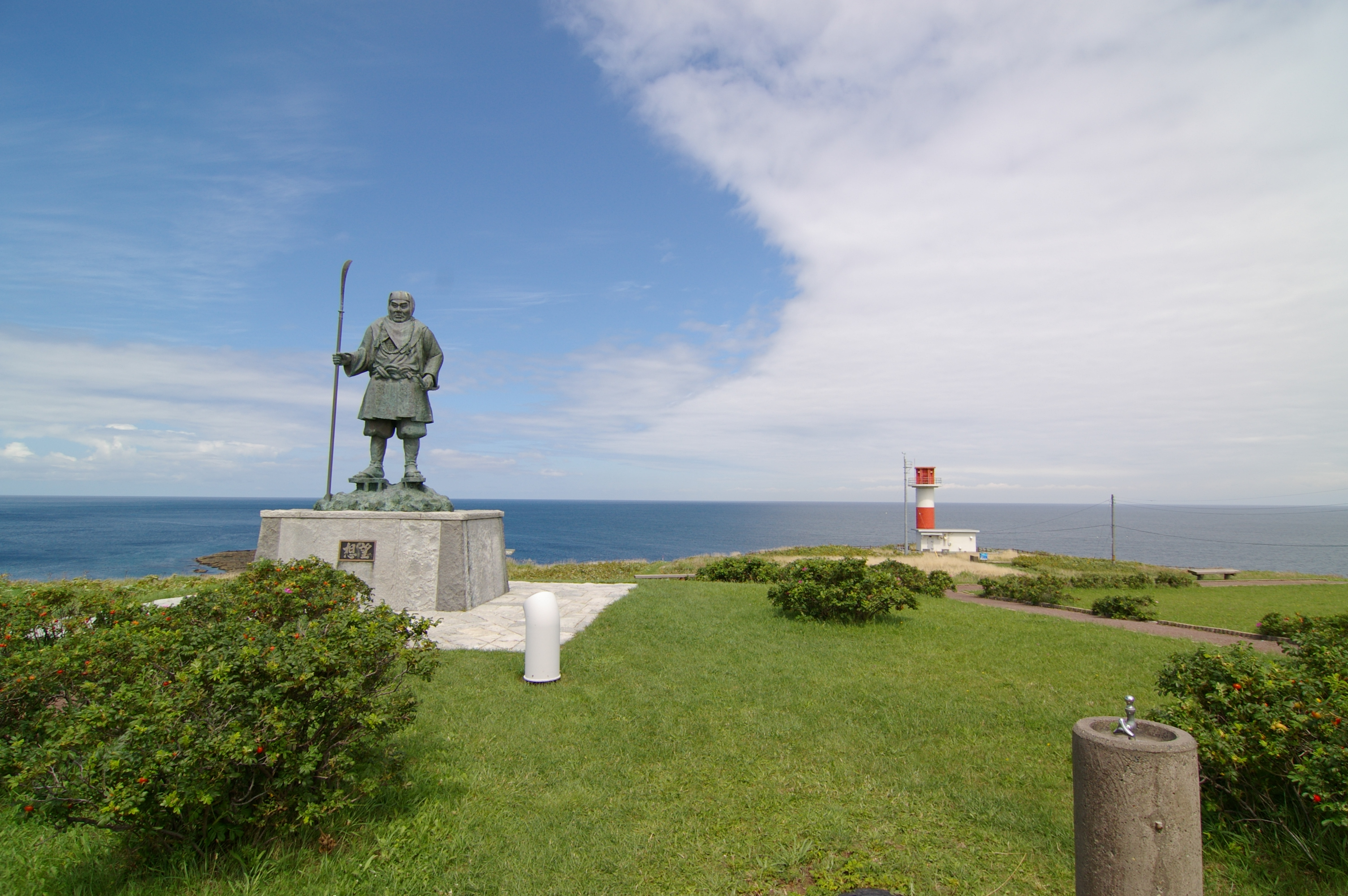
A statue of the famed warrior monk (sōhei) Benkei. Benkei trained at Enryakuji before entering the service of Minamoto no Yoshitsune. His exploits captured the public imagination, becoming a famous character in art and samurai lore.

Although the Tendai sect flourished under the patronage of the Imperial House and noble houses like the Fujiwara, by the end of the Heian period, it experienced an increasing breakdown in monastic discipline. This was partly caused by political entanglements with rival factions of the Genpei War (1180–1185). Due its popularity among the upper classes, the Tendai sect became very politically and militarily powerful during the Kamakura period. Major temples held vast landholdings and some even fielded their own monastic armies of sōhei (warrior-monks). This was not unusual for the time, as major Buddhist temples of other sects (such as Kōfuku-ji) had fielded armies to protect their estates from samurai armies and bandits. With the outbreak of the Genpei War (1180–1185), major Tendai temples armed themselves and even joined the war at times.

In response to the perceived worldliness and elitism of the powerful Tendai school, a number of low-ranking Tendai monks became dissatisfied and began to teach new doctrines which focused on simpler, popular practices, leading to a rise in new Buddhist schools. The major figures of this "New Kamakura Buddhism"—Nichiren, Hōnen, Ippen, Shinran, Eisai and Dōgen—all initially trained as Tendai monks. These new schools all made use of some Tendai practices and monastic organization to some degree, but they also tended to narrow their focus on specific practices (e.g. daimoku for the Nichiren school, zazen for Zen, nembutsu for Pure Land, etc.) in contrast to the broader Tendai approach. In spite of the rise of these new competing schools which saw Tendai as being "corrupt", medieval Tendai remained "a rich, varied, and thriving tradition" during the medieval period according to Jacqueline Stone.

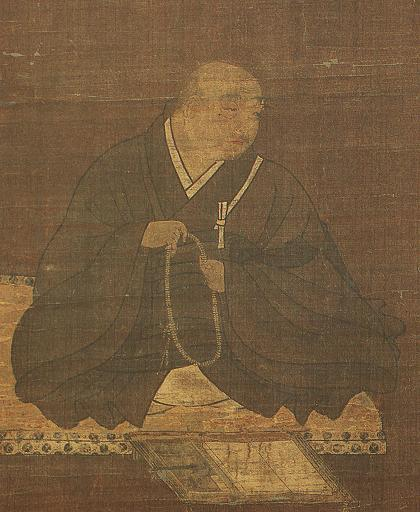

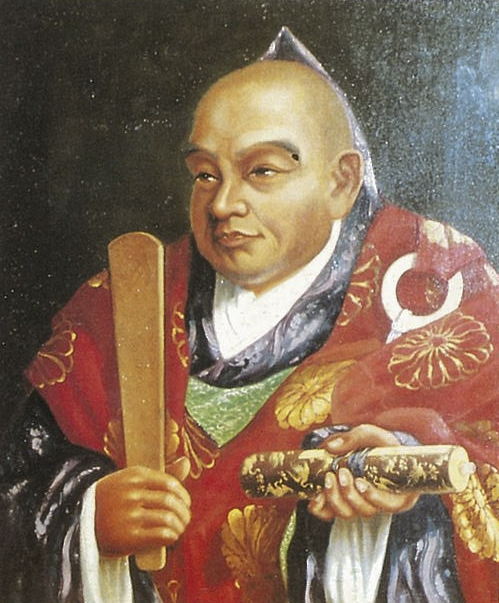
Hōnen (top) and Nichiren, two influential Tendai monks of the Kamakura period

Initially, the largest and most popular of these new traditions (Pure Land and Nichiren) did not attempt create new "schools" separate from Tendai, as many of their monastics continued to be ordained and trained in Tendai institutions. Over time however, these groups gradually differentiated themselves from the Tendai mainstream, eventually forming separate institutions. As the new sects developed during the Kamakura period, Tendai used its patronage network to oppose the growth of these new rivals. The Tendai establishment often used warrior monks to repress these groups. In one such event, Tendai monks destroyed the printing blocks of Hōnen's magnum opus, the Senchakushū, and raided the tomb of Hōnen. Despite internal divisions, the Tendai establishment remained politically and militarily powerful throughout the Kamakura Period. Enryaku-ji maintained its network of warrior monks and its influence at the imperial court and among the aristocracy, even while internal divisions led to increasing doctrinal and institutional disputes.

Kamakura period Tendai also produced a number of important figures of its own, including the historian and a poet Jien (1155–1225), who wrote the Gukanshō (a religious history of Japan) and numerous devotional poems. Hōjibō Shōshin (寶地房證眞, active 1153–1214), head of the Tendai curriculum at Mount Hiei, was another influential intellectual of medieval Japanese Buddhism. Shōshin wrote voluminously, and is most known for his commentaries on the writings of Zhiyi, the Personal Notes on the Three Major Works of Tendai (Tendai sandaibu shiki 天台三大部私記). This is "the most detailed study on Tendai doctrine until the twentieth century", according to Matthew Don McMullen. Shōshin also wrote on esoteric Buddhism, which he interpreted in line with classical Tiantai doctrine, instead of seeing it as a separate form of Buddhism. Notably, Shōshin rejected the view that esoteric Buddhism was superior to the Tendai Mahāyāna teaching of the one vehicle.

=== Muromachi and Sengoku Periods (1333–1600) ===
Tendai maintained its prestige and elite connections during the Muromachi period (1336–1573), but political instability and the weakening of the imperial court diminished its political influence. The school's warrior monks were drawn into larger conflicts, particularly during the Ōnin War (1467–1477), which devastated Kyoto and disrupted religious institutions. In 1465, Tendai monks also attacked the Shin school's Hongan-ji, destroying most of the temple.

One response to the various conflicts of the time were reform movements aimed at restoring the bodhisattva precepts and reinforcing moral discipline among monks. Kōen (1263–1317) formulated a ritual known as kaikanjō (戒灌頂), which integrated the observance of precepts with elements drawn from esoteric Buddhism. Ejin (1281–1358) similarly advocated rigorous adherence to the precepts, gaining the respect and patronage of Emperor Go-Daigo. In the following century, Shinsei (眞盛 1443–1492) stressed the combined importance of precept observance and the recitation of the nenbutsu, an approach articulated as the “two gates of precepts and invocation” (kaishō nimon 戒称二門). Broadly speaking, however, the fourteenth through sixteenth centuries did not witness any major doctrinal innovations within Japanese Tendai.

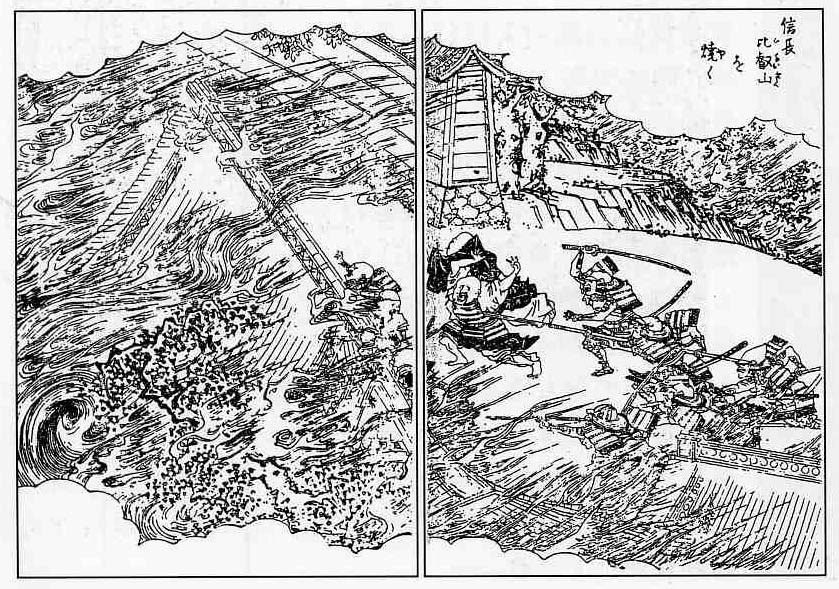
Nobunaga's samurai sacking Enryakuji temple

Instead, the tradition experienced a severe crisis during the Sengoku period (1467–1615), when the wardlord Oda Nobunaga, seeking to break the political and military power of Tendai, sacked Tendai's headquarters at Mount Hiei. Despite this devastation, Tendai remained a major school, as it maintained strong institutional bases elsewhere. Even Mount Hiei itself was rapidly reconstructed with the backing of Toyotomi Hideyoshi and the Tokugawa shoguns. Particularly significant was the flourishing of Tendai institutions in the Kantō region, especially after Edo (present-day Tokyo) became the political and cultural center under the Tokugawa shoguns.

=== Edo Period (1603–1868) ===
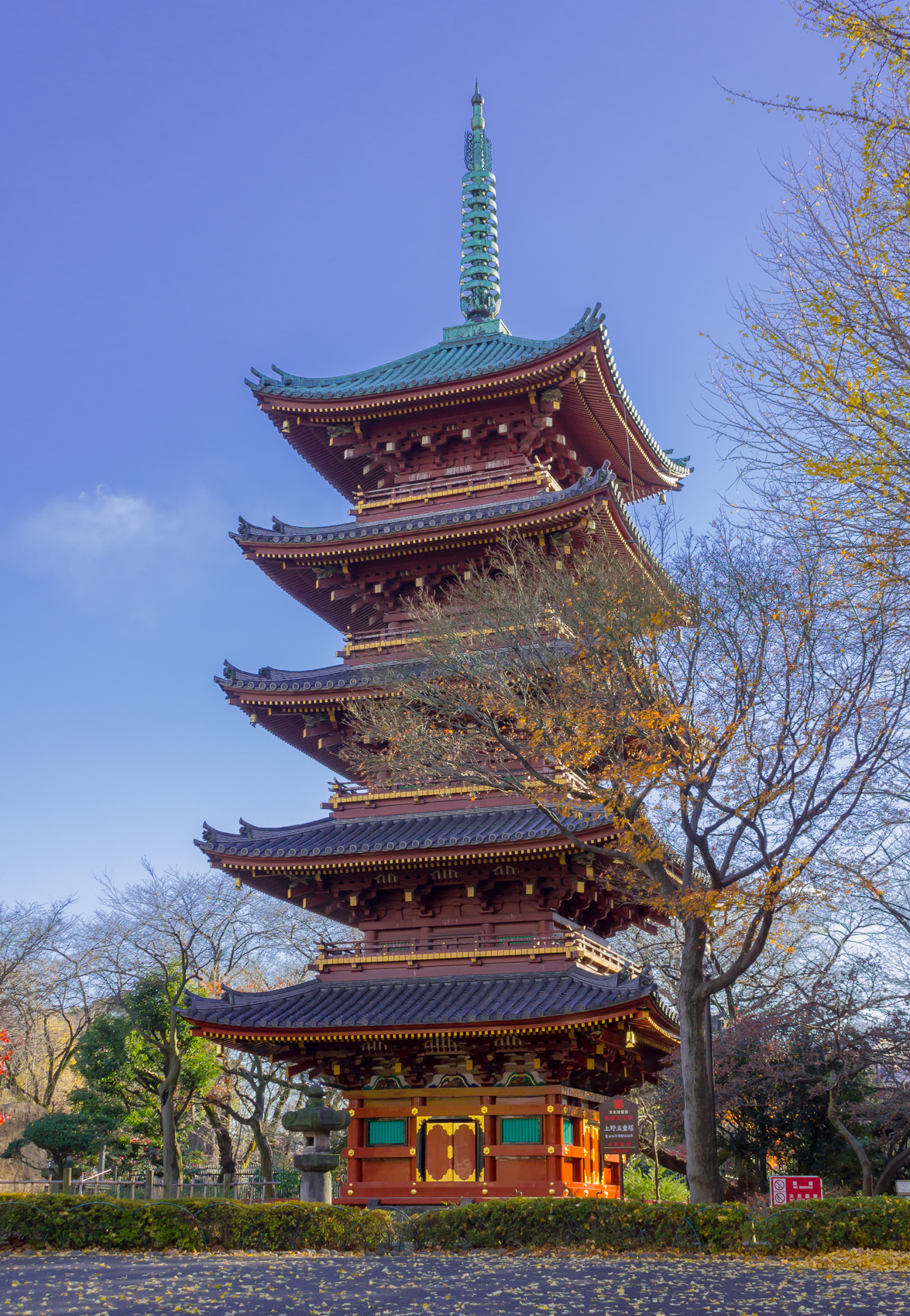
Kan'ei-ji's original Five-storied Pagoda

Seeking to control religious institutions, the Tokugawa shogunate introduced a new temple registration system (Danka system). Tendai, like other Buddhist schools, was integrated into the state's religious structure, and Enryaku-ji was rebuilt with shogunal support. While Tendai never regained the height of influence and power it had wielded in the past, it retained close ties to the Tokugawa shoguns and participated in the development of the Tokugawa Shogunate’s ruler cult, a syncretic Buddhist-Shinto religious system of Tōshō-gū shrines which helped legitimate the shoguns.

During this period, one of the most important Tendai leaders was Tenkai (1536–1643). Tenkai helped restore the school's prestige by securing Tokugawa patronage, linking Tendai to the ideology of the shogunate and building new temples like Kita-in, and Kan'ei-ji near Tokyo, the new seat of the Tokugawa shogunate. Tenkai also worked to print and publish the entire Chinese Buddhist Canon comprising 6,323 fascicles. Completed in 1648, this edition became known as the Kan'ei-ji Edition (or Tenkai Edition). This printing project is considered one of the most significant achievements in Japanese printing history. Tenkai also served as the head of the Tendai temple complex at Nikkō, which later became Ieyasu’s mausoleum. During this time, Tendai scholars also engaged in doctrinal debates with the emerging Ōbaku Zen school, which introduced new influences from China.

Another noteworthy development in the Edo period was the emergence of the Anraku school (安楽派), associated with Myōryū (1637–1690) and Reikū (1652–1739). This movement called for a renewed emphasis on monastic discipline grounded in the Four Part Vinaya. Its proponents criticized the moral laxity of the times, which they saw as being fostered by original enlightenment thought. They also promoted the thought of Siming Zhili (知礼, 960–1028), a prominent figure in Chinese Tiantai, thereby contributing to the revival of Tendai philosophical study. From this period onward, the Tiantai sijiao yi (天台四教儀, “Outline of the Fourfold Teachings”), attributed to Chegwan (諦観, c. 10th century), came to be widely employed as an introductory text for the study of Tendai doctrine.

=== Meiji Period to Present (1868–Present) ===
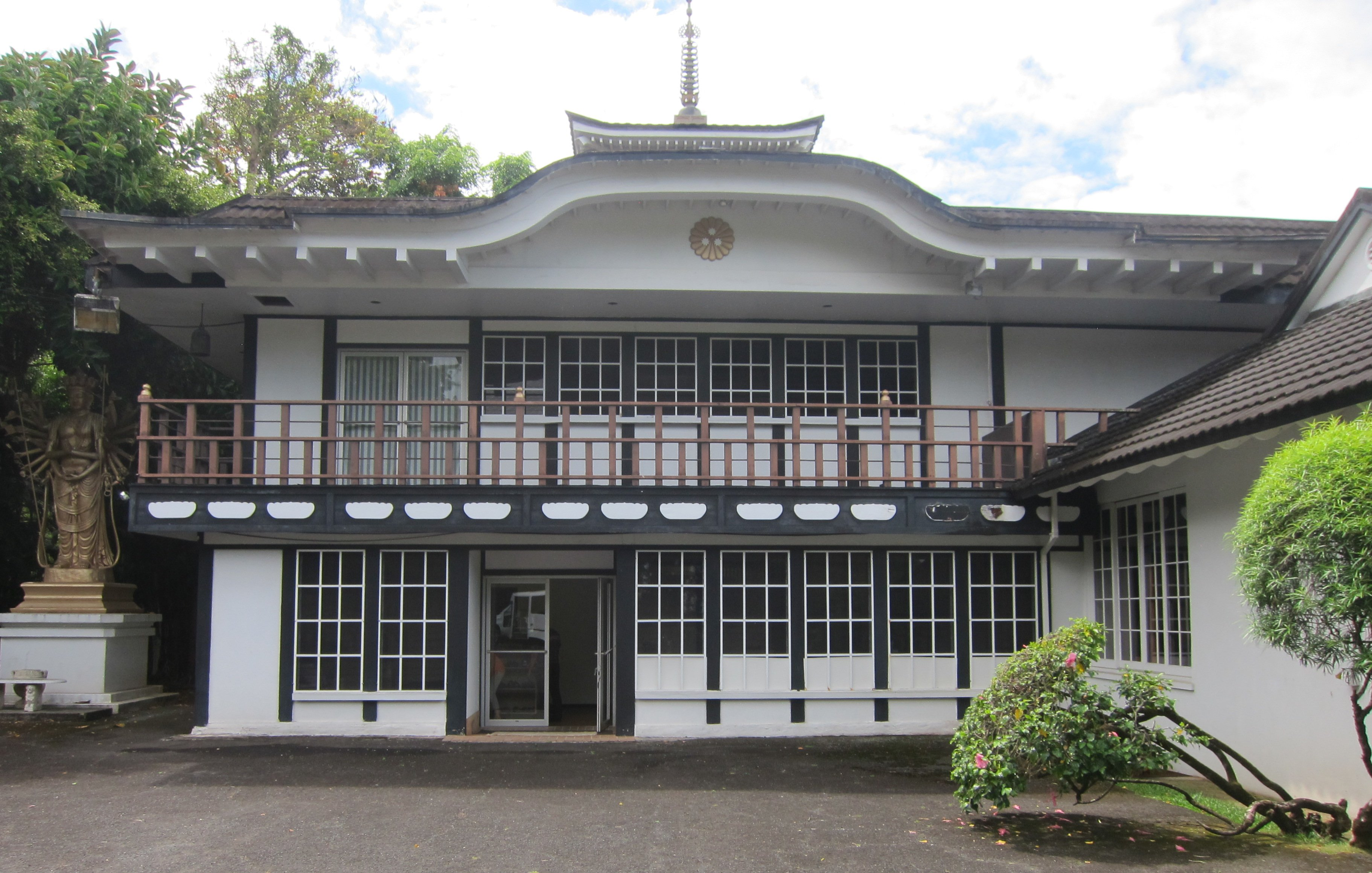
Tendai Mission of Hawaii, Honolulu

The Meiji Restoration brought severe challenges to Tendai and other Buddhist institutions. The government's official promotion of Shinto, and the separation of Shinto from Buddhism, led to the confiscation of temple lands and a decline in patronage. The 19th and early 20th centuries saw efforts to modernize the Tendai school while maintaining its traditional teachings. In the 20th century, Tendai became part of the broader Buddhist revival movements in Japan, with renewed interest in its esoteric and Lotus Sutra-based teachings.

One of the most prominent Tendai figures of the 20th century was Shōchō Hagami (1903–1989). He served as President of the Japanese Religious Committee for World Federation and was a great practitioner of extensive Kaihōgyō. Hagami, along with Etai Yamada (1900–1999) were two major Tendai figures of the 20th century. They widely promoted religious dialogue with other world religions and traveled widely.

Today, the Tendai school remains active, with Enryaku-ji serving as its headquarters and major training center. The number of Tendai temples is smaller than that of other schools that developed broader popular followings (like Pure Land, Zen, and Nichiren). Some influential historical Tendai temples became administratively independent, like Sensō-ji in Tokyo and Tennō-ji in Osaka. While no longer a dominant force in Japanese Buddhism, Tendai continues to influence various traditions through its doctrinal legacy and training system. Mount Hiei served as the focal point for commemorations in 1987 marking the 1,200th anniversary of Saichō’s retreat to the mountains. Tendai thought also remains an object of academic study both within Japan and internationally, with Taishō University in Tokyo retaining its affiliation with the Tendai school.

Tendai has also expanded to Western countries. Though not as widespread as other Japanese Buddhist schools like Zen and Shinshu, some Tendai temples have been founded in the West, including the Tendai Mission of Hawaii Betsuin, which was founded before WWII and received its first bishop, Ryokan Ara, in the 70s. Furthermore, the Tendai Buddhist Institute in Canaan, New York, founded by Abbot Monshin Paul Naamon and his wife, Rev. Shumon Tamami Naamon, has become the first Tendai Buddhist training center authorized to train priests in North America.

== Worldview ==
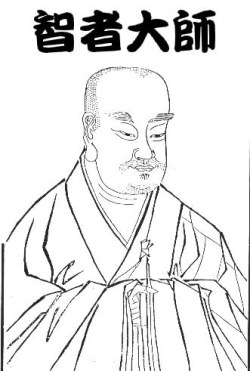
Śramaṇa Zhìyǐ (沙門智顗; Chih-i), the foundational philosopher in Tendai thought

According to Jiko Hazama, the Tendai Buddhist worldview advocates a comprehensive form of Buddhism which sees all through an inclusive reading of the One Vehicle (ekayāna) teaching of the Lotus Sutra. This holistic and inclusive form of Buddhism is based on the doctrinal synthesis of Tiantai Zhiyi, who draws on the Lotus Sutra and the broader Mahayana tradition. Tendai's inclusive view of religion allowed it to reconcile Buddhist doctrine with aspects of Japanese culture such as Shinto and Japanese aesthetics. Tendai doctrines like original enlightenment and honji suijaku contributed to the integration of native Japanese religion with Mahayana Buddhism.

In the major Tendai institutions like Taisho University and Mount Hiei, the main subjects of study are the Lotus Sutra, the works of the Tiantai Patriarch Zhiyi, the works of the founder Saichō and some later Tendai figures like Ennin.

=== Foundational Tendai philosophy ===
The thought of the Japanese Tendai school is founded on the classic Chinese Tiantai doctrines found in the works of patriarchs Zhìyǐ and Zhanran. These foundational doctrines include:

- The trace and origin teachings of the Lotus Sutra: the one vehicle and the infinite lifespan of the Buddha respectively,
- All beings have buddha-nature and can become Buddhas as per the Nirvana Sutra,
- The Threefold Truth and Three Samadhis,
- The Five Periods and Eight Teachings,
- The Six Degrees of Identity
- The Four Siddhanta,
- "Three Thousand Realms in a Single Thought Moment" (ichinen sanzen 一念三千).

Tendai Buddhism reveres the Lotus Sutra as the highest teaching in Buddhism. In Saichō's writings, he frequently used the terminology hokke engyō "Perfect Teaching of the Lotus Sutra" (法華円教) to imply it was the culmination of the previous sermons given by Gautama Buddha. Because of the central importance of the Lotus Sutra, Tendai Buddhism sees all Buddhist teachings and practices as being united under the One Vehicle (ekayāna) taught in the Lotus Sutra. Saichō frequently used the term ichijō bukkyō (一乗仏教; "One Vehicle Buddhism") and referred to the Lotus Sutra as his main scriptural basis.

Saichō taught that there were "three kinds of Lotus Sutra". According to Jacqueline Stone, these can be explained as follows:

- The Fundamental Lotus: "the one vehicle which represents the Buddha's single compassionate intent, underlying all his teachings, to lead all beings to buddhahood."
- The Hidden and Secret Lotus: "those teachings in which, due to the immaturity of the Buddha's audience, this intention is not outwardly revealed."
- The Lotus that was Preached Explicitly: The actual text of the Lotus Sutra.

Stone writes that Saichō saw all Buddhist teachings as being the true "Lotus Sutra" and he therefore attempted to integrate all Buddhist teachings he had studied within a single framework based on the Lotus Sutra's One Vehicle.

Hazama Jikō writes that the central feature of Tendai thought is its advocacy of the "One Great Perfect Teaching" (一大円教), "the idea that all the teachings of the Buddha are ultimately without contradiction and can be unified in one comprehensive and perfect system." This idea was used by Saichō as a basis for his integration of the various schools of Buddhism into a single comprehensive synthesis. Hazama writes that "Saichō included both esoteric and exoteric teachings, and avoided an obsession with any one category of the Buddhist tradition such as Zen or the precepts. He sought instead to unite all of these elements on the basis of a single fundamental principle, the comprehensive and unifying ekayana spirit of the Lotus Sutra."

Saichō believed that by consolidating all Buddhist ideas and practices and including all the varieties of Buddhism, his new school would allow all to "enter the great sea of Thusness which has a single flavor" (真如一味の大海) by following the path of goodness, and that this would protect the nation. According to Hazama Jikō "these themes run throughout Saichō's work" including his Hokke shuku 法華秀 句 and Shugo kokkai sho 守護国界章.

=== Doctrinal classification ===
Tendai thought also frames its understanding of Buddhist practice on the Lotus Sutra's teaching of upāya or hōben (方便; expedient means). Furthermore, Tendai uses a similar hierarchy as the one used in Chinese Tiantai to classify the various other sutras in the Buddhist canon in relation to the Lotus Sutra, and it also follows Zhiyi's original conception of Five Periods Eight Teachings or gojihakkyō (五時八教). This doctrinal classification system (panjiao) is based on the doctrine of expedient means, but was also a common practice among East Asian schools trying to sort the vast corpus of writing inherited from India.

Later Tendai thinkers like Annen provided a new doctrinal classification system (based on Zhiyi's system) for Japanese Tendai. All Buddhist teachings are seen as being included into the following categories. The first major group are those teachings that rely on the three vehicles:

- The Tripiṭaka teachings (zō 藏), i.e. sravakayana or Hinayana
- The Common teaching to both Mahayana and non-Mahayana (tsū 通)
- The Unique Mahayana teachings (betsu 別)

The highest teachings are those who derive from the one vehicle:

- The Complete/Round Tendai teaching (en 圓), derived from the Lotus Sutra, Nirvana, and Avataṃsaka-sūtra
- The Esoteric teachings (mitsu 密), derived from the esoteric scriptures like the Mahavairocana

=== Universal Buddha-nature ===
Tendai thought defends the Lotus Sutra's teaching that all beings have the potential for full buddhahood and claims that the Lotus was a teaching for all sentient beings. This teaching in particular was a major point of contention with the Japanese Hossō (Yogacara) school who espoused the Five Natures Doctrine (五姓各別, goshō kakubetsu) which argues that not all being can become buddhas, since some do not have the seeds for Buddhahood. The heated debates between Saichō and the Hossō scholar Tokuitsu frequently addressed this controversy as well as other related issues, such as how to categorize the various Buddhist teachings, and the value of certain Tendai teachings. The debates continued after Saichō's passing, with figures like Ryōgen and Genshin taking part in official court debates against Hossō scholars, and writing treatises defending the Tendai position.

Another element of Tendai buddha-nature thought was the notion that the phenomenal world, the world of our experiences, fundamentally is an expression of the Dharma. Tendai Buddha-nature thought claims that each and every sense phenomenon just as it is is an expression of the Dharma. This idea comes from Zhanran's view of buddha nature as an all-pervasive reality that also includes insentient things (like mountains, rivers etc). Drawing on this, Saichō also argued that insentient things possess Buddha-nature and that the distinction between sentient and insentient is ultimately illusory, since buddha-nature pervades all things through the principle of mutual inclusion, in which each phenomenon contains all others. Thus for Saichō ultimate reality, the Dharmakaya, actively manifests in the phenomenal world as the world itself.

=== Hongaku ===
The medieval Tendai school was the locus of the development of the Japanese doctrine of hongaku 本覚 (innate or original enlightenment), which holds that all beings are enlightened inherently. This theory developed in Tendai from the cloistered rule era (1086–1185) through the Edo period (1688–1735). According to Jacqueline Stone, the term "original enlightenment" itself (Chn. pen-chileh) is first found in the Awakening of Faith in the Mahayana, "where it refers to true suchness considered under the aspect of conventional deluded consciousness and thus denotes the potential for enlightenment in unenlightened beings." The idea developed in the Chinese Huayen tradition and influenced Chan Buddhism, as well as the thought of Saichō and Kūkai.

Stone writes that medieval Tendai doctrine regarded "enlightenment or the ideal state as inherent from the outset and as accessible in the present, rather than as the fruit of a long process of cultivation." Scholars also refer to the doctrinal system associated with this idea as "original enlightenment thought". Stone defines this as the "array of doctrines and concepts associated with the proposition that all beings are enlightened inherently." According to Stone, as these teachings developed, they grew to include the idea that:

Not only human beings, but ants and crickets, mountains and rivers, grasses and trees are all innately Buddhas. The Buddhas who appear in sutras, radiating light and endowed with excellent marks, are merely provisional signs. The "real" Buddha is the ordinary worldling. Indeed, the whole phenomenal world is the primordially enlightened Tathāgata.

Tamura Yoshirō argued that hongaku was a non-dual teaching which saw all existents as interpenetrating and mutually identified. This negates any ontological difference between buddhas and common people as well as between pure lands and mundane worlds. Tamura argued that this move re-affirms the relative phenomenal world as an expression of the ultimate nondual reality and is found in phrases like "the worldly passions are precisely enlightenment" and "birth and death are precisely nirvana". These lineages also transmitted their teachings through transmission rituals which made use of mirrors to illustrate nonduality and the interpenetration of all phenomena.

Hongaku teachings were passed down through various exoteric teaching lineages (which often involved secrecy), the largest of which were the Eshin-ryu and the Danna-ryu. At the core of these doctrinal systems was the Tendai practice of the "threefold contemplation in a single thought" (isshin sangan 一心 三観) taught in Zhiyi's Mohezhiguan. According to Stone, this practice is based on seeing "that all phenomena are empty of substance, provisionally existing, and the middle, or both empty and provisionally existing simultaneously."

While certain scholars have seen hongaku thought as denying the need for Buddhist practice, Stone notes that Tendai hongaku based texts like the Shinnyokan 真 如 観 (Contemplation of true suchness) and the Shuzenji-ketsu 修 禅 守 伏 (Decisions of Hsiuch’an-ssu) deny this idea. Instead, these texts teach various kinds of Buddhist practices, including nenbutsu, contemplation of emptiness (kukan 空観), meditations using Buddhist icons and mirrors, practicing the threefold contemplation in the midst of daily activities and recitation of the daimoku during the process of death.

Hongaku thought was also influential on the development of New Kamakura Buddhism and the founders of these schools, though they had their own unique understandings. However, not all Tendai thinkers embraced hongaku thought. For example, the more conservative commentator Hōjibō Shōshin criticized hongaku ideas as a denial of causality.

=== Buddhahood with this very body ===
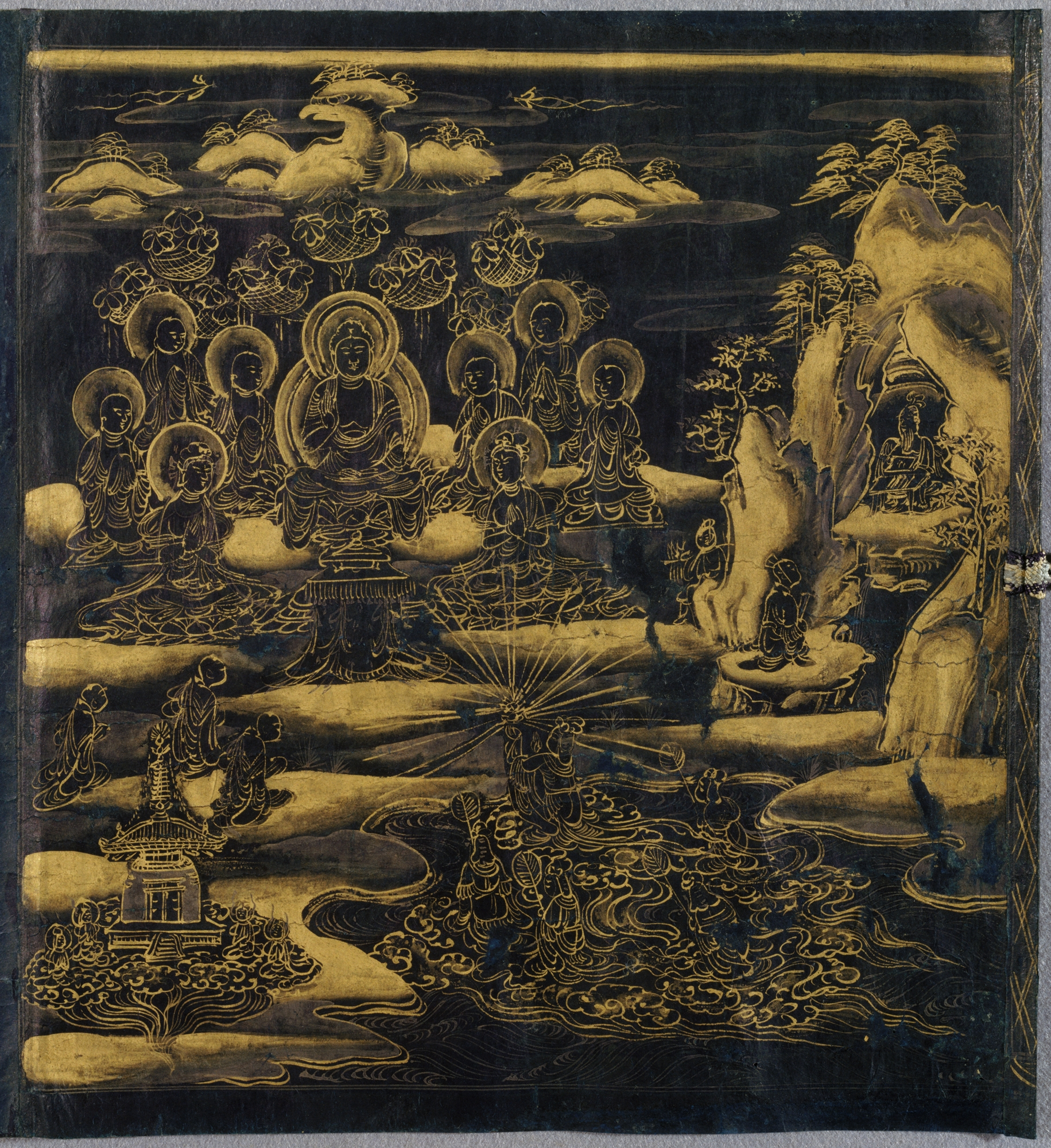
A 12th century Japanese illustration of the nāga princess offering the jewel to the Buddha. This Lotus Sutra story was used by Tendai scholars to argue for sokushin jōbutsu.

Another important doctrine in Japanese Tendai is that it is possible to attain "Buddhahood with this very body" (即身成佛 sokushin jōbutsu). This is closely related to the idea of original enlightenment. This idea was introduced by Saichō, who held that this attainment described certain advanced practitioners who had realized the fifth degree of identity, though this was a rare thing. Saichō understood the Lotus Sutra to be the "great direct path" to Buddhahood which could be attained in this very body. Saichō saw the story of the Dragon king's daughter in the Lotus Sutra's Devadatta chapter as evidence for this direct path (jikidō) to Buddhahood which did not require three incalculable eons (as was taught in some forms of Mahayana Buddhism), but could be achieved in three lives or even one lifetime. Later Tendai scholars sent questions to Chinese Tiantai masters asking about this issue, and the answers also tended to be conservative. Tiantai monks like Tsung-ying accepted the idea that one could attain the fifth degree of identity in this life, but that this was applicable primarily to advanced practitioners who had already reached a high degree of spiritual maturity.

However, the influence of esoteric Buddhism and the need to compete with the Shingon school led Tendai scholars to continue to explore ways to "shorten the path" and attain Buddhahood swiftly in one lifetime. Later Tendai scholars like Rinshō, and Annen were much more optimistic about sokushin jōbutsu, claiming certain esoteric practices could lead to Buddhahood rapidly in only one lifetime, while de-emphasizing the concern with achieving Buddhahood in future lives. They also further extended the application of this idea to individuals at the lower degrees of identity, arguing that one could jump over bodhisattva stages and attain Buddhahood without fully eradicating the defilements. This idea, known as "realization by worldlings" (bon'i jōbutsu), posited that practitioners could gain Buddha-wisdom through the power of the Buddha's presence and the Taimitsu esoteric practices. According to Groner, this allowed "for the possibility that worldlings who still have some of the coarser defilements might experience sokushin jōbutsu."

Other Tendai figures like Hōjibō Shōshin (1136–1220 or 1131–1215), an important Tendai commentator on Zhiyi's works, were more traditional and critical of ideas concerning the rapid realization of Buddhahood for everyone (without outright denying the possibility of Buddhahood in this body). For Shōshin, sokushin jōbutsu applied to those who had "superior religious faculties" because they "have previously practiced the various provisional teachings" in many previous lives.

=== Honji suijaku ===
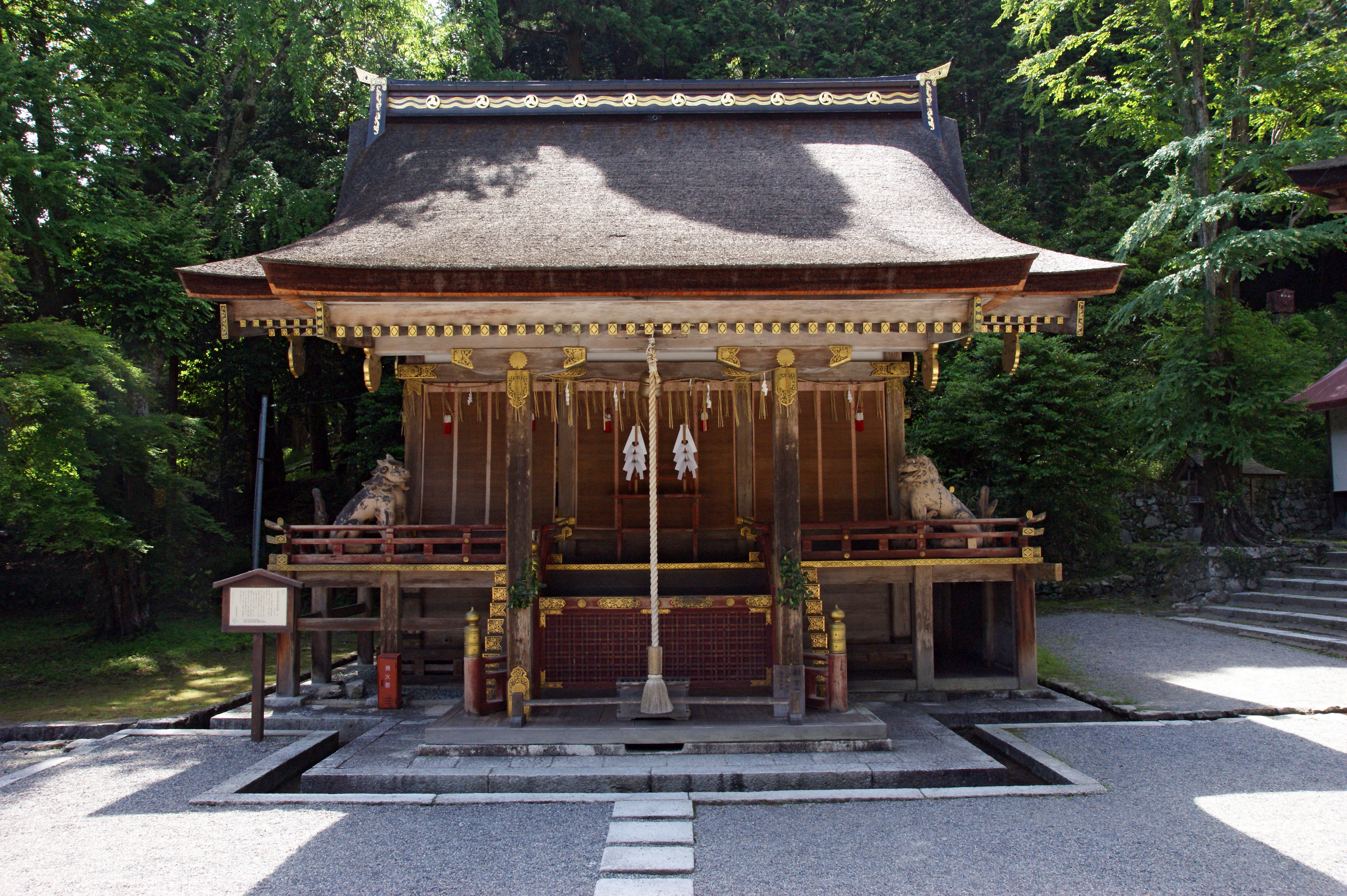
Hie Taisha, a Sannō Shintō shrine on Mount Hiei

Another important theory which developed in the Japanese Tendai school during the early Heian period was the theory of honji suijaku (本地垂迹, traces from the original ground). This idea facilitated the integration of native Japanese deities (kami) into the Buddhist pantheon, with buddhas seen as representing the ‘original ground’ (honji 本地) and the kami as their ‘traces’ (suijaku 垂迹). Although this theory became prominent on Mount Hiei, its conceptual roots can be traced to the Chinese Tiantai tradition, particularly its teaching of the two gates: the 'gate of the essential teaching' (benmen 本門) and the 'gate of the trace' (jimen 迹門), as outlined in the Lotus Sūtra. Esoteric Buddhism also played a key role in shaping this theory by distinguishing between Dainichi's body of fundamental nature (honji-shin 本地身). This framework positioned all buddhas, bodhisattvas, wisdom kings, and celestial beings as manifestations of Dainichi (Mahavairocana). Initially, the honji suijaku theory aimed to incorporate indigenous deities into a two-tiered structure; however, its reliance on 'oral transmissions' (kuden) eventually fostered a proliferation of localized interpretations.

The theory influenced the understanding of sacred figures at Enryakuji and Hie Taisha (now Hiyoshi Taisha). Additionally, the honji suijaku concept contributed to reimagining Mount Hiei's geographical landscape as a symbolic cosmology. This is reflected in the Hie Sannō maṇḍala, which visually illustrates the two-tiered structure by positioning buddhas above Mount Hiei and corresponding deities below. The integration of Esoteric Buddhism with local religious practices ultimately resulted in the formation of Sannō Shintō, a distinct Shintō tradition associated with Mount Hiei. This tradition developed within the dual institution formed by Enryakuji and Hie Shrine.

== Study ==
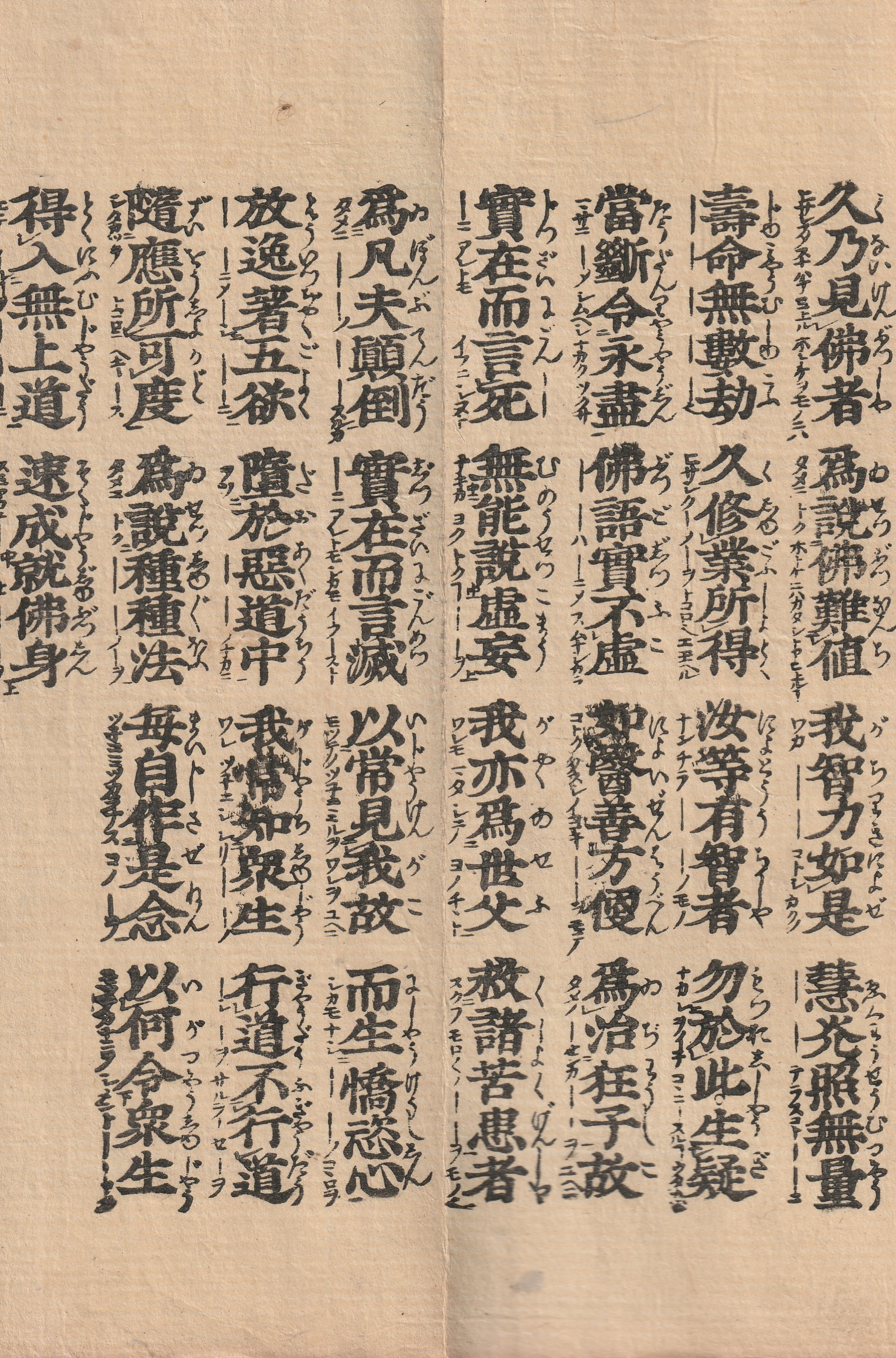
A page from a Lotus Sutra folding manuscript, printed in the Edo period. The Hiragana written to the right of the Kanji characters contains the Onyomi ("Chinese sound") and the Katakana letters to the left contains the Kanbun translations.

The Tendai school emphasizes the unity of study and practice. The curriculum includes a comprehensive approach to Buddhist study that reflects its foundation in the Chinese Buddhist tradition. The Tendai curriculum is distinctive for its breadth, combining scriptural study, debate, and exegesis.

The primary textual foundation of the Tendai school is the Threefold Lotus Sūtra (Japanese: Hokke-kyō), which is regarded as the supreme teaching of the Buddha and the main scriptural authority of the Tendai tradition. In addition to the Lotus Sutra, the Tendai curriculum includes several other key Indic sources which are used to support the Lotus Sutra which are: the Daichido-ron (Great Wisdom Treatise), the Mahāparinirvāṇa Sūtra (Jp: Daihatsunehan-kyō), the Prajñāpāramitā Sūtra in 25000 slokas (Daihannya-kyō) and the Book of the Original Acts that Adorn the Bodhisattva (Bosatsu Yōraku Hongyō Kyō, T. 24, No. 1485). Other sutras are also studied, such as the Brahmajāla Sūtra (Bonmō-kyō), which provides the school with its bodhisattva precepts.

There are also numerous Chinese Tiantai Treatises studied in Tendai Buddhism. The writings of the Chinese Tiantai patriarch Zhiyi (538–597) are also central. Three key works form the core of Tendai scholastic study: Makashikan (摩訶止観), Profound Meaning of the Lotus Sutra (Hokke Gengi, 法華玄義), and Words and Phrases of the Lotus Sutra (Hokke Mongu, 法華文句). These are always read with the commentaries by Zhanran. Another important work by Zhiyi for Tendai is the Commentary on the Meaning of the Bodhisattva Precepts, which is a key work for novices seeking to understand the Tendai approach to the precepts. There are also various other works which are important, including other works by Zhiyi, Zhanran and Siming Zhili.

Regarding Japanese sources, the works of Saichō, especially his works on the bodhisattva precepts like the Kenkairon (Clarifying the Precepts), are central to the Tendai understanding of ordination and precepts.

Apart from these sources, the Tendai school also maintains a tradition of Esoteric Buddhism (Taimitsu, Mikkyō). The key esoteric scriptures in the Tendai esoteric curriculum are: Vairocanābhisaṃbodhi Sūtra (Dainichi Kyō), Vajrasekhara Sūtra (Kongōchōkyō), and the Susiddhikara Sūtra (Soshitsujikara-kyō). These are read alongside various traditional commentaries by Yixing, Ennin, Enchin and Annen.

== Practice ==
=== Tendai Practice Theory ===
A feature unique to Japanese Tendai Buddhism from its inception was the concept of shishūyūgō (四宗融合, "Integrating the Four Schools"). Senior Tendai teachers, or ajari, train in various practice traditions, especially the "Shishū Sōjō" (Four-fold transmission).

Under the umbrella of the Lotus Sutra, Tendai integrates four main aspects of Mahayana Buddhist practice. This is often described with the compound En-Mitsu-Zen-Kai (圓密禪戒 “Perfect-Secret-Meditation-Precepts”). To these four key elements, the Pure Land Dharma Gate is often added. The main elements of Tendai practice are thus:

- Perfect or Round (En) teachings, which includes a broad range of practices including the study of Mahayana sutras and Tendai doctrine (Tendai no kyōgi), as well as various ritual practices, such as the Lotus Repentance Ritual (Hokke Senbo). It also includes Lotus Sutra devotional practices, such as those described in the Hokke Genki, which often center around the recitation of the Lotus Sutra. A common practice still observed today is the Method for Prostrating to the Dharma Flower Sūtra (禮法華經儀式), which involves prostrations to each character of the sūtra in long (the entire sutra), medium (selecting one chapter of the text), or short forms. The short form focuses on prostrating to the characters of the sūtra's title, often accompanied by a dedication chant.
- Esoteric practices (Mitsu or Mikkyō 密教) which make use of mantras, mudras and mandalas from tantras like the Vairocanābhisaṃbodhi Sūtra and Yixing's commentary
- Meditation (Zen), this is not the practice of "Zen Buddhism", but merely signifies Tendai teachings on "meditation" (dhyāna), including Śamatha-vipaśyanā meditation (Shikan 止観, "calming-insight") based on Zhiyi's Móhē zhǐguān and to a lesser extent, his other meditation works
- Precepts (Kai), in particular the Bodhisattva Precepts based on the Lotus Sutra and the Brahmajāla Sūtra.
- Pure Land (Jōdo 浄土) practices focused on Amitabha, especially the recitation of the Buddha's name (nembutsu), based on the Pure Land sutras and Treatise on the Pure Land by Vasubandhu

To this, one can also add other elements that became integrated to Tendai practice, including Shinto and Shugendō practices. It is due to this syncretic aspect of Tendai that it is sometimes termed Integrated Buddhism (総合佛教 Sōgōbukkyō).

According to Saichō and other later Tendai scholars, the Perfect teaching of the Lotus Sutra and the tantric doctrines and practices of Esoteric Buddhism had the same ultimate intent. This view of the equality and compatibility between the Tiantai Lotus teachings and Esoteric Buddhism was important for Saichō. Unlike the Shingon founder Kūkai, Saichō did not see esoteric teachings as more powerful or superior to exoteric Tendai teaching and practice. Instead, Saichō held that all Buddhist teachings are included in the single intent of the Lotus Sutra. This idea is reflected in the saying "Shingon (esoteric Buddhism) and (Tien-tai) shikan are essentially one; therefore both traditions are propagated on one mountain" (from Shōshin's Tendai Shingon nishii doi sho).

Certain later Tendai figures like Ennin also argued that esoteric practices led to Buddhahood faster than exoteric (non-esoteric) practices and some (such as Annen) argued that they were the only way to full Buddhahood. These figures also often saw the Lotus Sutra (which refers itself as "the secret essential of the buddhas" and "the secret treasure of the Tathagatha") as an esoteric text and this view has some precedent in the Chinese Tiantai tradition.

=== Shikan meditation ===
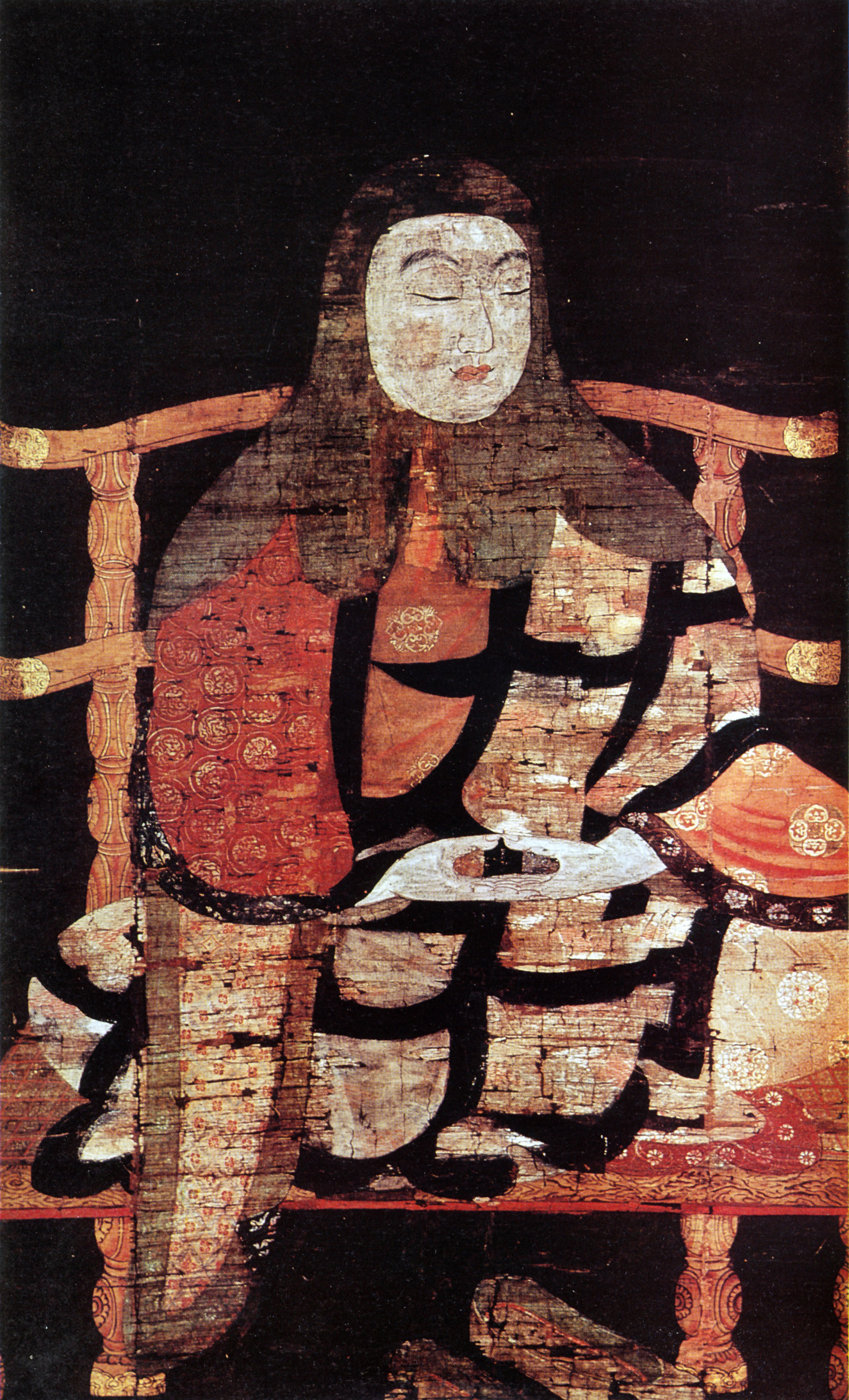
A painting of Saichō meditating

Tendai's Shikan-gō (止觀業) tradition focuses on shikan (śamatha-vipaśyanā) meditation, especially on the Four Samadhis (四種三昧, shishu zanmai) as taught in Zhiyi's Móhē zhǐguān (Great Cessation [and] Contemplation). Saichō emphasized the importance of the Four Samādhis in his Kanjō Tendai-shū Nenbun Gakushō-shiki (Regulations for Tendai School Annual Ordinands), and he sought to establish special halls as a place for these practices. The Four Samādhis are foundational to Tendai Buddhism and are designed to cultivate deep states of meditative absorption (samādhi).

The Four-fold Samādhi (四種三昧 shishu-zammai) is outlined as follows:

- Constantly Sitting Samādhi (常坐三昧, Jōza Zanmai): This practice involves seated meditation (zazen) for a period of 90 days. The practitioner remains in a seated posture, focusing on meditation without interruption. This practice is rooted in the Mañjusri Prajñaparamita Sutra and emphasizes the cultivation of inner calm and mental clarity.
- Constantly Walking Samādhi (常行三昧, Jōgyō Zanmai): This involves walking meditation for 90 days, typically around a statue of the Buddha Amitābha or within a designated meditation space. The practitioner maintains mindfulness while moving. This practice is based on the Pratyutpanna Samādhi Sutra, which emphasizes the contemplation of Amitābha and recitation of his name. It also influenced the development of Pure Land Buddhism in East Asia.
- Half-Walking and Half-Sitting Samādhi (半行半坐三昧, Hangyō Hanza Zanmai): This practice alternates between periods of seated meditation and walking meditation, seamlessly transitioning between the two without breaks. The duration can vary, with some practices lasting 21 days (based on the Lotus Sutra) or 7 days (based on the Great Correct and Equal Dhāranī Sutra). This practice is often incorporated into rituals like the Hokke Senbo (法華懺法, Lotus Repentance Ritual), where practitioners alternate between sitting and walking while chanting the Lotus Sutra and other texts.
- Neither Walking nor Sitting Samādhi (非行非坐三昧, Hikō Hiza Zanmai): This practice is not confined to a specific posture or duration. It encompasses all forms of meditation that do not fit into the other three categories, allowing for flexibility in practice. This practice represents the ultimate goal of integrating meditation into every moment of daily life, emphasizing the universality of meditative practice beyond structured forms.

Other forms of Tendai meditation include the famous hiking meditation practice of Kaihōgyō (回峰行 Circling the mountain).

=== Pure Land practice ===
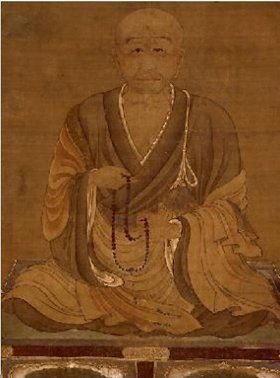
Genshin's Ōjōyōshū (往生要集, "Essentials of Birth in the Pure Land") had a considerable influence on later Pure Land teachers such as Honen and Shinran.

Pure Land meditations (kansō nenbutsu 観想念仏) and recitation of the Buddha's name (shōmyō nenbutsu 称名念仏) are also an integral part of Tendai practice. In the Tendai tradition, practices related to Amitābha and his pure land of Sukhavati began with Saichō's disciple, Ennin. After journeying to China for further study and training, he brought back a practice called the "five-tone nembutsu" or goe nenbutsu (五会念仏), which was a form of intonation practiced in China for reciting the Buddha's name. This contrasted with earlier practices in Japan starting in the Nara period, where meditation on images of the Pure Land, typically in the form of mandala, were practiced. In addition to the five-tone nembutsu brought back from China, Ennin also integrated a special monastic training program called the jōgyō zanmai (常行三昧, "Constantly Walking samadhi") originally promulgated by Zhiyi. In this practice, monks spend 90 days in retreat, circumambulating a statue of Amitābha constantly reciting his name.

In addition to increasing monastic practices related to the Pure Land, Tendai monks also taught recitative nenbutsu to the lay community. These included temple monks and itinerant wanderers called hijiri. The most famous of these nenbutsu hijiri (念仏聖, "Itinerant Pure Land teachers") was a monk named Kūya (空也, 903–972). Pure Land Buddhist thought was further developed by a Tendai monk named Genshin (源信, 942–1017), the author of an influential treatise called Ōjōyōshū (往生要集; "The Essentials of Rebirth in the Pure Land"). Genshin also promoted the notion of the Latter Age of the Dharma, which held that society had degenerated to a point when people could no longer rely on traditional Buddhist practices, and would instead need to rely on Amitābha's grace to escape saṃsāra. Genshin drew upon past Chinese Pure Land teachers such as Daochuo and Shandao.

The nenbutsu was further popularized by the Tendai monk Hōnen, who is considered the founder of what would later become the first independent Pure Land school, the Jōdo-shū. However, Hōnen and most of his students never formally broke with the Tendai school, and he remained a Tendai monk for his entire life, even as he was attacked by other Tendai establishment figures. Thus, Hōnen's movement was initially a faction (ha) within the Tendai school. It was only after the 14th century that the Jōdo-shū became a truly independent tradition. Hōnen's following included another monk named Shinran, who eventually established the related Jōdo Shinshū sect.

=== Tendai Esotericism (Taimitsu) ===
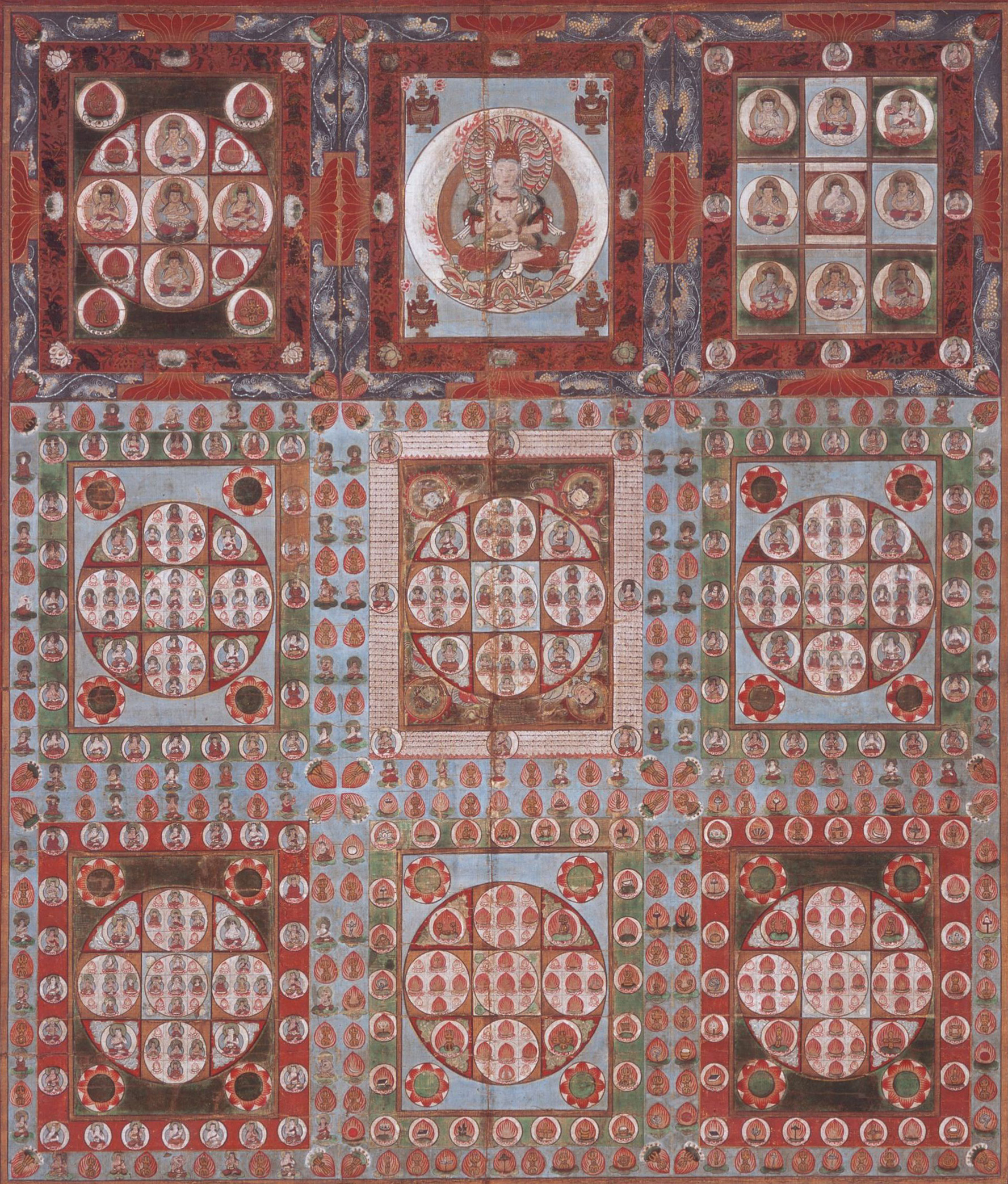
Taizokai Mandala (Senkoji Tonami), one of the two main mandalas in Taimitsu

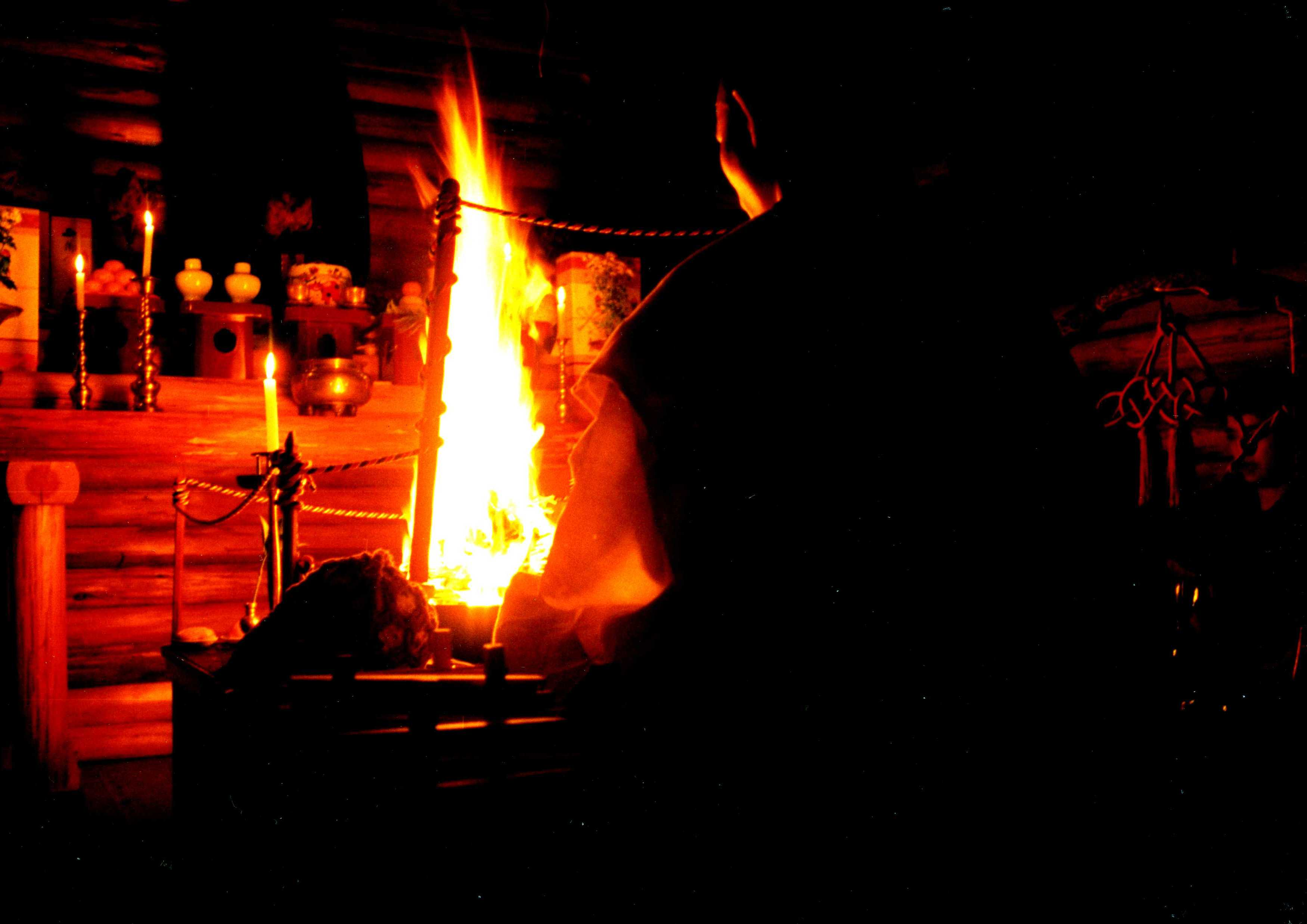
The goma ritual is an important esoteric practice in Tendai.

A key element of Tendai is esoteric Buddhist practice and theory. This was originally known as "the shingon (or mikkyō) of the Tendai lineages" and was later named Taimitsu ("Tendai Esotericism", 台密), distinguishing it from the Shingon (Mantra) school, which is known as "Tōmitsu" (東密, literally, "the esotericism of the Tōji lineages"). Taimitsu, as a form of East Asian Esoteric Buddhism, holds that by making use of mantras, mudras, and mandalas ("the three mysteries"), one is able to attain Buddhahood in this very body. Eventually, these esoteric rituals came to be considered of equal importance with the teachings of the Lotus Sutra, which also came to be seen as an esoteric sutra (but only "in principle", not "in practice", since it did not include the practice of the three mysteries).

The origins of Tendai Taimitsu are found in Chinese Esoteric Buddhism. As a result, Tendai esoteric ritual bears much in common with Shingon, though some of the underlying doctrines and practices differ. Regarding its textual basis, while Shingon mainly uses the Mahavairocana Tantra and the Vajrasekhara Sutra, Tendai uses a larger corpus of texts, including the Lotus Sutra and esoteric Lotus Sutra texts. Other differences mainly relate to individual lineages. There are several lineages of Taimitsu, the main ones being the Sanmon 山門 (Mountain branch of Ennin's lineage, which has a further 13 sub-branches) and Jimon 寺門 (Temple branch of Enchin's lineage, which is more unified).

According to Linda Dolce, "Saichō regarded esoteric Buddhism as equal to the Lotus-based Buddhist system that had been developed in China by Tiantai, as both embodied the soteriological idea of 'one vehicle'". Later Taimitsu scholars, like Ennin, classified esoteric scriptures into two types: those containing the principles of esoteric Buddhism (i.e. the non-duality of ultimate truth and worldly truth) were called rimitsu, and those that teach the principles and practices (i.e. the three mysteries) were called riji gumitsu. The first category was initially said to include the Nirvana, Lotus Sutra, Vimalakīrti, and Huayan sūtras, all of which were seen as esoteric in principle. The second category includes the tantric scriptures like the Mahavairocana, Vajrasekhara, the Susiddhikāra Sūtra (Soshitsujikara), the Pudichang jing 菩提場経 (Bodaijō kyō, T. 950), and the Yuqi jing 瑜祇経 (Yugi kyō, T. 867). Some Tendai scholars like Annen even elevated the esoteric teachings further, seeing them as the highest teachings of the Buddha, and the only way to enlightenment. According to Paul Groner, this view subordinated the Lotus Sutra to the esoteric scriptures. According to Dolce, Annen "displaced other practices existent in Tendai as soteriologically incomplete practices", and turned esoteric rituals into the very embodiments of the ultimate truth (rather than just another type of skillful means).

This view was not accepted by all Tendai lineages however, and later figures like Hōjibō Shōshin (fl. 1153–1214) rejected the idea that esoteric practice was higher or superior to Tendai Mahayana practice (as taught in the Mohe Zhiguan), since both of these traditions are ultimately founded on the middle way and both teach the contemplation of the emptiness of dharmas. Shōshin held that mantras and other esoteric practices were merely another skillful means for contemplating the middle way, and thus, the exoteric and esoteric were just different expressions of the same principle. Shōshin also argued that these teachings both derive from the same Buddha, since Mahāvairocana and the Buddha of the Lotus Sūtra are ultimately the same. In some cases, Shōshin goes further, arguing that certain esoteric practices, such as those that make use of images like mandalas or lunar discs, were designed for those with dull faculties, while the Tendai practice of "discerning one's own mind" (Jp. kanjin, 觀心) is for those who are more advanced and do not require images.

Later Tendai developments would also make the Lotus Sutra a full "Practice Esotericism" (Jimitsu) sutra through the development of esoteric practices and texts that placed the Lotus on the same level as the tantrism of the Mahavairocana sutra. To defend this view, Tendai scholars pointed to passages in the Lotus Sutra itself, such as when the sutra refers to itself as "the secret essential of the buddhas" and "the secret treasure of the Thus-Come One". They also relied on the interpretations of Yixing.

==== Lotus Esotericism (Hokke Mikkyō) ====
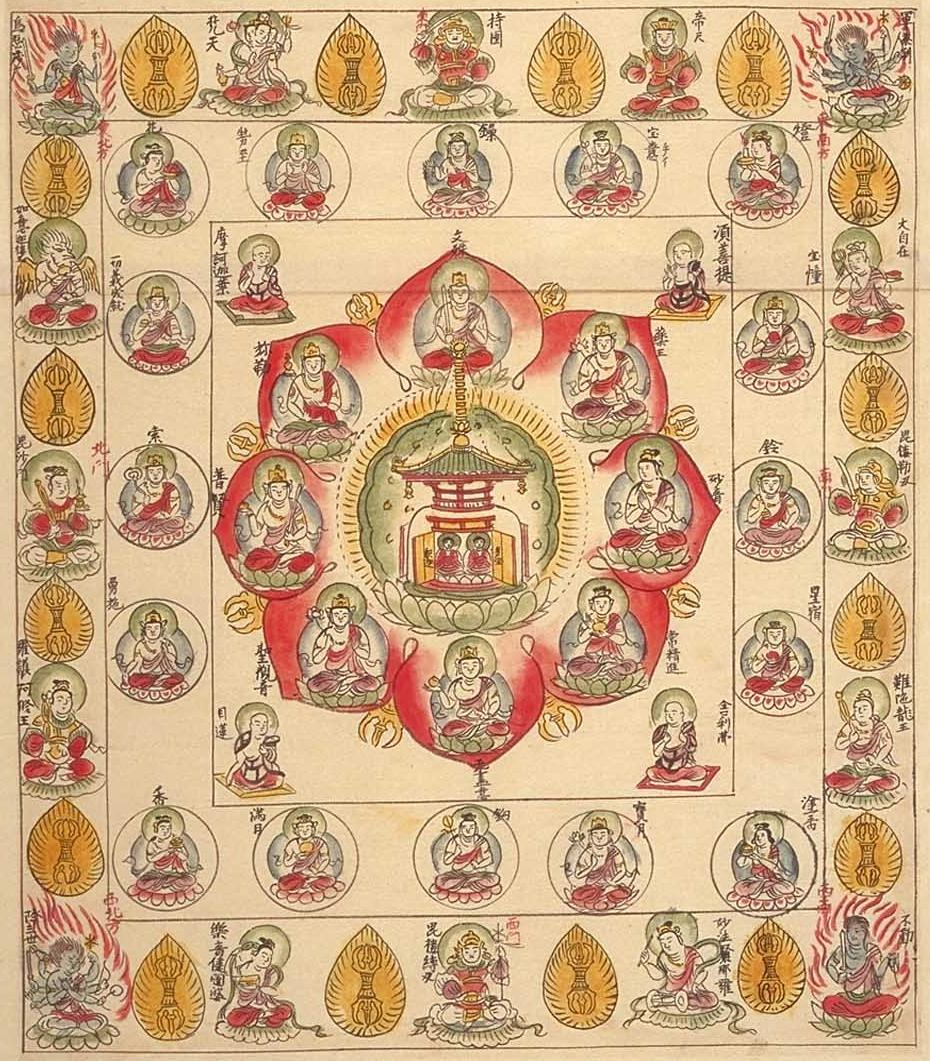
Lotus Sutra Mandala used in esoteric Lotus Sutra Rites (Hokkekyō-Hō), c. late Heian period

The Lotus Sutra underwent a process of "esotericization" in the medieval Tendai school, fueled by the tradition's engagement with Esoteric Buddhism. This esotericism did not originate in Japan, since there were esoteric sources written in China that Tendai relied on for their interpretations of the Lotus Sutra. However, Lotus Esotericism became much more central in Japanese Tendai than in the mainland. The most important Chinese sources for this tradition are Yixing's (683–727) Darijing Shu (Commentary on the Mahāvairocana Sutra), which integrates Tiantai ideas with Chinese mantrayana, and the Ritual Manual for the Contemplation of the Lotus Sutra (Fahua guanzhi yigui, 法華経観智儀軌), an esoteric manual. This manual describes a deity yoga practice based on the Lotus Sutra which relies on reciting passages and mantras from the sutra, and arranging a ritual altar and a Lotus Maṇḍala. The Lotus Contemplation Manual derives from Amoghavajra's circle and was likely composed by him or some of his disciples. In Japan, this rite was later adapted into new forms.

Tendai monks developed these esoteric Lotus practices further, one of the most important ones being the Lotus Ritual (Hokke Hō), which combined recitations of the Lotus Sutra with esoteric mantras and visualizations. These rituals center on reciting and contemplating the "Life Span of the Tathāgata" chapter and on visualizing Prabhutaratna and Śākyamuni in a mandala (along with mudras and mantras). Both Buddhas became equated with Mahāvairocana (of the Vairocanābhisaṃbodhi Sūtra), corresponding to the two aspects of Mahāvairocana embodied in the Vajradhātu and Garbhadhātu Maṇḍalas respectively. The rite also relies on the use of mantras and dhāraṇīs, including the dhāraṇīs taught in the Lotus Sutra, the daimoku (the Lotus Sutra's title), along with the "Root Mantra of the Lotus Sutra" (法華根本真言), which were believed to encapsulate the sutra's profound esoteric meaning.

The Lotus rite's visual focus is the Lotus Sutra Maṇḍala (Hokkekyo mandara 法華経曼荼羅), which is rooted in an esoteric interpretation of the Lotus Sūtra, specifically the chapter concerning the Treasure Stūpa where Śākyamuni and Prabhūtaratna sit side by side. Its design features an eight-petaled lotus, a motif adapted from the Womb realm maṇḍala. The maṇḍala's structure, which arranges deities around a central focus, draws on the dual-realm maṇḍalas of Esoteric Buddhism, and symbolizes the non-duality of the Lotus Sutra with esoteric teachings. A unique element of Tendai esotericism is the concept of unifying the dual-realm maṇḍalas (and the teachings of their respective tantric scriptures) through a third element which was associated with the Susiddhikara sūtra. This interpretation was also understood through the Tendai doctrine of the three truths. The third element of susiddhi (perfect realization) was considered to be like the third truth of the middle, the non-dual unity of the reality of the dual-world mandalas. Since the Susiddhikara sūtra did not teach a specific mandala, the Lotus mandala was often used to represent this third esoteric truth. In the Lotus mandala, the stūpa represents the Dharma-body (dharmakāya), Prabhūtaratna corresponds to the Retribution body (sambhogakāya), and Śākyamuni aligns with the Manifestation body (nirmanakāya). The central court is identified with Dainichi of the Vajradhātu Maṇḍala, while the eight bodhisattvas correspond to the Eight Worthies of the Garbhadhātu Maṇḍala's eight-petaled lotus. In this interpretation, Śākyamuni is associated with Dainichi of the Garbhadhātu, Prabhūtaratna with Dainichi of the Vajradhātu, and the stūpa itself symbolizes the principle of susiddhi, representing a synthesis including all elements of both mandalas.

=== Bodhisattva precepts ===
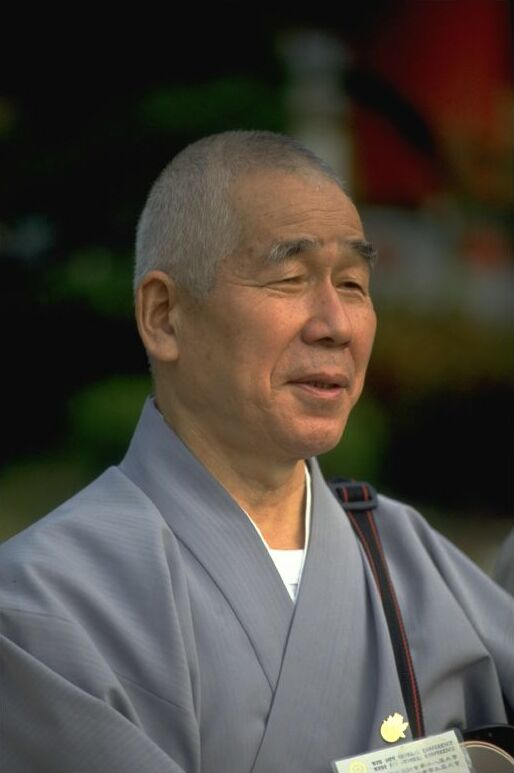
A Tendai priest. Japanese Tendai priests take the bodhisattva precepts and do not use the traditional Vinaya pratimoksha vows.

The Tendai school's ethical teachings focus exclusively on the bodhisattva precepts (C. pusajie, J. bostasukai 菩薩戒) drawn from the Brahmajala Sutra. Tendai ordinations do not make use of the traditional Dharmaguptaka Vinaya's monastic rule (Pratimoksha). Saichō argued in favor of this idea in his Kenkairon (顕戒論, On promoting the Mahāyāna precepts). This was a revolutionary change in East Asian Buddhism that was without precedent. These bodhisattva precepts do not make a distinction between monastics and laypersons, and they do not discuss the minutiae of monastic life like the Hinayana Pratimoksha does.

The bodhisattva precepts in Tendai are all said to rely on three types of "pure precepts" (三聚浄戒, sanjujokai):

- Precepts against doing evil deeds, such as murder, theft, pride, anger, and so forth (sho ritsugi kai 摂律 儀 戒)
- Precepts encouraging good activity, for benefiting oneself (sho zenbo kai 摂菩法戒)
- Precepts encouraging activity which will benefit others (sho shujo kai 摂衆生戒)

According to Hazama Jikō:

The first category includes the prohibitions against the ten major and forty-eight minor transgressions as explained in the Bonmokyo 梵辋経 (T24, 997–1010). It also includes general restrictions against any kind of evil activity, whether physical, verbal, or mental. Any and all kinds of moral cultivation are included. The second category entails every kind of good activity, including but not limited to acts associated with the Buddhist categories of keeping precepts, the practice of concentration (samadhi), and the cultivation of wisdom. Also included are such worldly pursuits as dedication to scholarly excellence, or any effort aimed at self improvement. The third category refers not only to the effort to help and save all sentient beings through the perfection of the six Mahayana virtues (paramita, charity, morality, patience, diligence, meditation, and wisdom), but also includes such mundane activity as raising one's children with loving care, living for the sake of others, and dedicating oneself to the good of society.

The Tendai school made extensive use of the Lotus Sutra in its interpretation of the bodhisattva precepts, even though the sutra does not itself contains a specific list of precepts. Also, various passages from the sutra were used to defend the Tendai position not to follow the Pratimoksha, since they state, for example, "we will not follow śrāvaka ways." Saichō’s rejection of the Hīnayāna vinaya precepts stemmed from his understanding of the Lotus Sutra as the ultimate expression of the Buddha's teachings. In his biography, Eizan Daishi den, Saichō expressed his commitment to abandoning the 250 Hīnayāna precepts and focusing on the bodhisattva path. His interpretation of the Lotus Sutra, particularly its the "Comfortable Practices" chapter, provided a basis for rejecting śrāvaka practices and precepts. Saichō’s reforms eventually led to the development of the "Perfect-Sudden Precepts", which emphasized the inherent Buddha-nature in all beings and allowed for a more flexible approach to monastic discipline. This was the fundamental ethical teaching for Tendai thought. Saichō also believed that the world had entered the age of Dharma decline (mappō) and that because of this, the Hinayana precepts were no longer able to be practiced and no longer needed. He also believed that the Japanese people were naturally inclined to the Mahayana Buddhism. Because of this, Saichō argued that only Mahayana precepts were needed.

Some of Saichō's views on Mahayana precepts were drawn from the Tiantai masters Huisi and Daosui and the teachings Chan masters like Bodhidharma, Dao-xuan (Jp: Dōsen), especially his commentary on the Brahmā's Net Sūtra, and Daoxin's (Jp: Dōshin) Manual of Rules of Bodhisattva Precepts. These Chinese Chan masters emphasized formless practice (無相行) or attribute-less practice, also known as anrakugyō (Ch. anlexing 安樂行, "serene and pleasing activities"), both in Chan meditation and in precept training. This refers to a way of contemplation that applies in all activities. These various Chinese ideas about the integration of practice and precepts were integrated into Saichō's view of the "Perfect and Sudden Precepts" (Endonkai).

During the Kamakura and Muromachi periods, Tendai monks such as Ninkū (1307–1388) and Annen (841–?) further developed the concept of the Perfect-Sudden Precepts. Annen's Futsūju bosatsukai kōshaku argued that the precepts were rooted in Buddhahood itself, reinterpreting the ordination rite in a further non-dual and esoteric direction, and allowing for breaking of precepts on certain occasions.

=== Tendai and Shinto ===
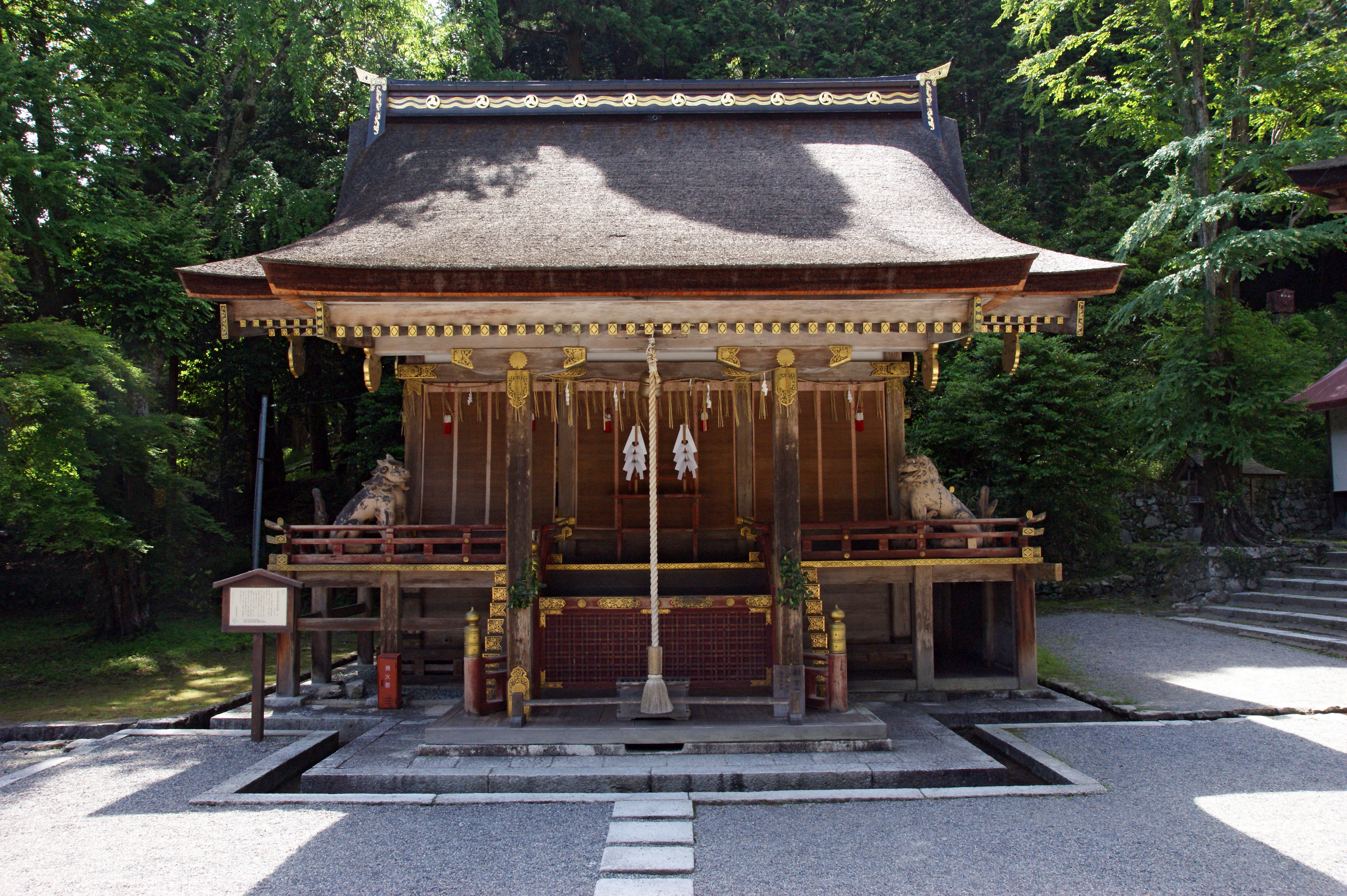
Hie Taisha, a Sannō Shintō shrine on Mount Hiei

Tendai doctrine allowed Japanese Buddhists to reconcile Buddhist teachings with the native religious beliefs and practices of Japan (now labeled "Shinto"). In the case of Shinto, the difficulty is the reconciliation of the pantheon of Japanese gods (kami), as well as with the myriad spirits associated with places, shrines or objects, with Buddhist teachings. These gods and spirits were initially seen as local protectors of Buddhism.

Sannō Shintō 山王神道 was a specifically Tendai branch of syncretic Buddhist-Shinto religious practice, which revered kamis called the Mountain Kings (Sannō) or Sanno Sansei 山王三聖 (The Three Sacred [Deities] of Sanno) and was based on Hie Taisha 日吉大社 a shrine on Mount Hiei. The Togakushi Shrine (戸隠神社, Togakushi Jinja) was also associated with the Tendai school before it was separated from Buddhist institutions by the Japanese state during the separation of Shinto from Buddhism in the 19th century.

These religious ideas eventually led to the development of a Japanese current of thought called honji suijaku (本地垂迹), which argued that kami are simply local manifestations (the suijaku or "traces") of the Buddhas (honji, "true nature"). This manifestation of the Buddhas was explained through the classic Mahayana doctrines of skillful means and the Trikaya.

=== Shugendō ===
Some Tendai Buddhist temples and mountains are also sites for the practice of the syncretic Shugendō tradition. Shugendō is a mountain ascetic practice which also adopted Tendai and Shingon elements. This tradition focuses on ascetic practices on mountainous terrain. The practice of Shugendō is most prominent among certain Tendai branches, like the Jimon-ha 寺門派 (the Onjōji branch). It is based on Shōgoin Temple, which houses the Honzan group (Honzanha), the Shugendō tradition most closely associated with Tendai.

=== Art and aesthetics ===
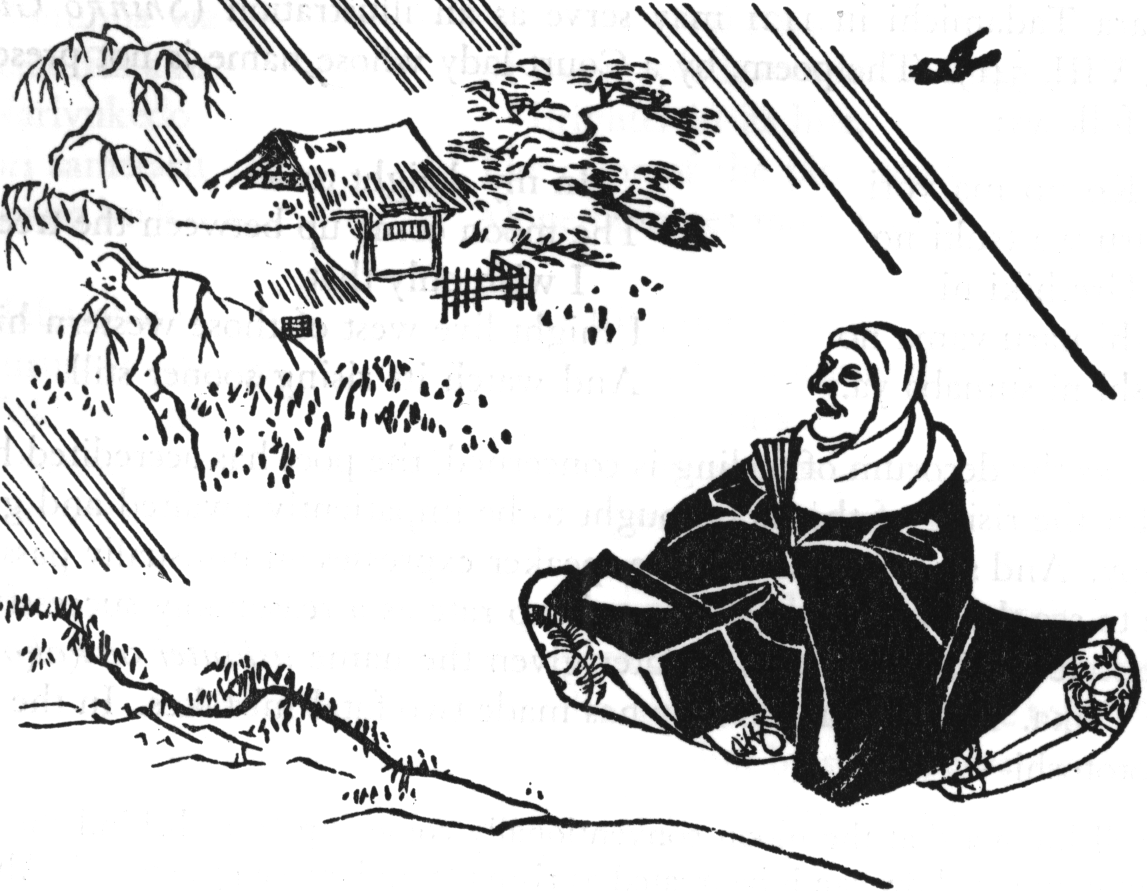
Shunzei reciting a poem

The classic Buddhist understanding of the Four Noble Truths posits that craving for pleasure, worldly desire and attachment must be cut off to put an end to suffering (dukkha). In early Buddhism, the emphasis, especially for monastics, was on avoiding activities that might arouse worldly desires, including many artistic endeavors like music and performance arts. This tendency toward rejecting certain popular art forms created a potential conflict with mainstream East Asian cultures.

However, later Mahayana views developed a different emphasis which embraced all the arts. In Japan, certain Buddhist rituals (which were also performed in Tendai) grew to include music and dance, and these became very popular with the people. Doctrinally, these performative arts were seen as skillful means (hōben, Skt. upaya) of teaching Buddhism. Monks specializing in such arts were called yūsō ("artistic monks"). The writing of religious poetry was also a major pursuit among certain Tendai as well as Shingon figures, like the Shingon priest Shukaku and the Tendai monk Jien (1155–1225). These poets met together to discuss poetry in poetry circles (kadan). According to Deal and Ruppert, "Shingon, Tendai and Nara cloisters had a great impact on the development of literary treatises and poetry houses."

Another influential poet monk from the Tendai tradition was Fujiwara no Shunzei (1114–1204). His son, Fujiwara no Teika was also influenced by the classic Tendai thought of Zhiyi. These two figures were central to the development of the aesthetic concept of yūgen (幽玄, profound grace and subtlety). According to William R. LaFleur, the development of yūgen aesthetic theory was also influenced by the Tendai practice of shikan meditation. According to LaFleur, for Shunzei's poetics, the beauty of yūgen manifests a deep tranquility which reflects and is akin to shikan practice. This link is asserted by Shunzei in his Kurai futeisho. These poets also understood the depth of yūgen through the holistic Tendai metaphysics of interfusion.

== Key Tendai figures ==
=== Chinese Ancestors ===
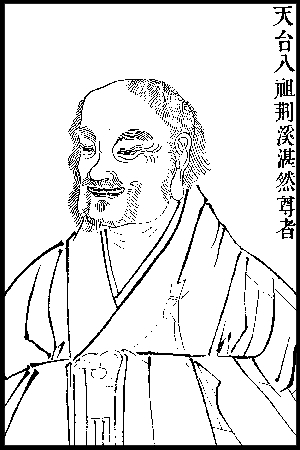
Jingxi Zhanran

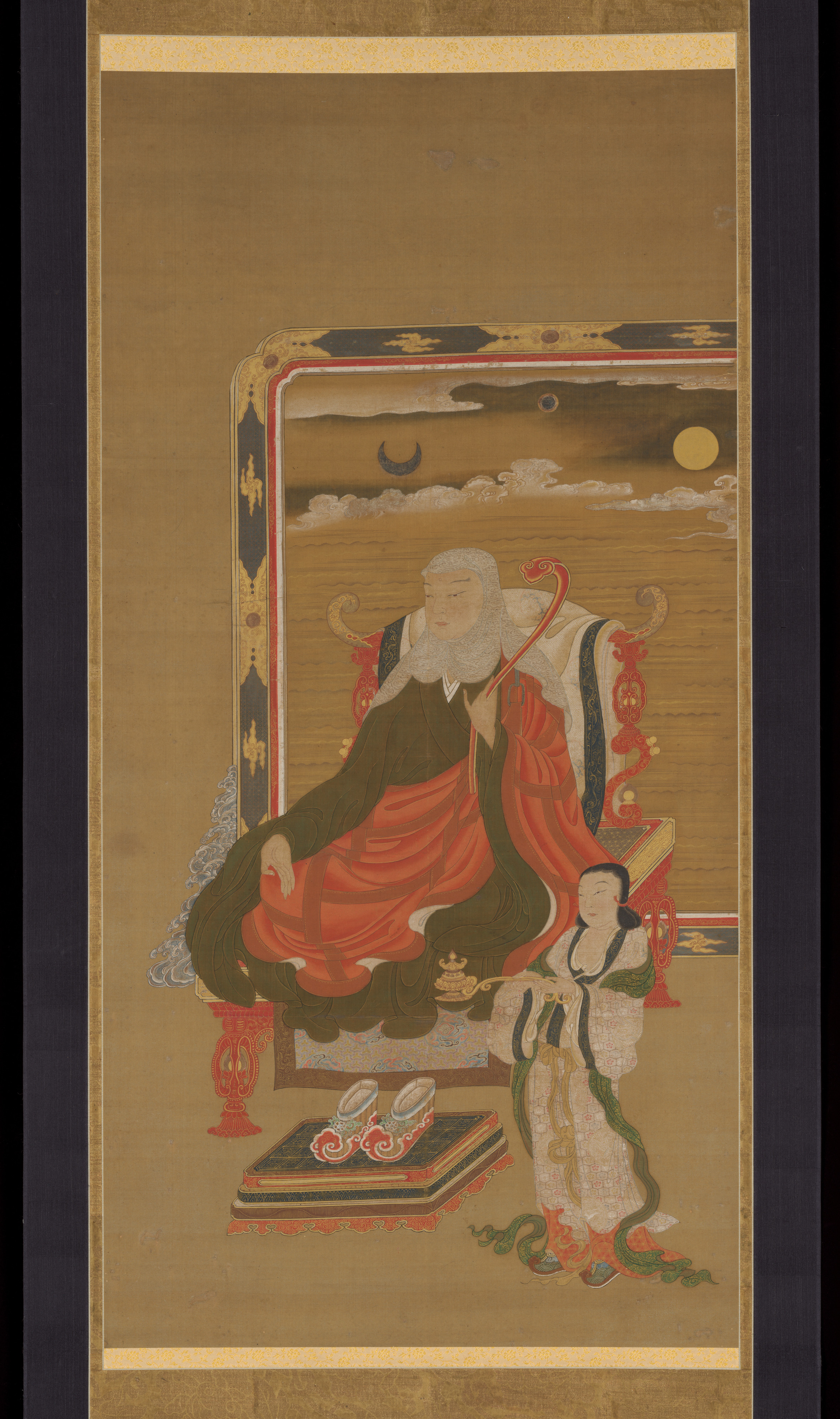
Portrait of Dengyō Daishi (Saichō) at the MET

The following ancestors or patriarchs (祖) form the main line of the Chinese Tiantai lineage:

- Nāgārjuna (3rd century CE)
- Huiwen (d.u.), who is said to have read Nāgārjuna's works, practiced accordingly, and then had a direct insight into the master's Dharma, thus initiating the Chinese Tiantai lineage
- Nanyue Huisi (515-577), a Meditation Master and Lotus Sūtra specialist who was Zhiyi's teacher
- Tiantai Zhiyi (538–597), the most important figure of the Tiantai school who wrote the foundational treatises of the tradition
- Guanding 561–632), Zhiyi's student, he edited and compiled the main treatises of Zhiyi
- Zhiwei (?–680)
- Huiwei (634–713)
- Xuanlang (673-754)
- Zhanran (711-782), the second most important Chinese Tiantai master, he wrote some key commentaries to Zhiyi's three major works
- Daosui (806-820) and Xingman (?–823), both students of Zhanran and teachers of Saichō

=== Japanese Ancestors ===
The Japanese Tendai founder Saichō (最澄, 767–822) was a student of the last two patriarchs on the list, Daosui (806-820) and Xingman (?–823), both of whom studied under Zhanran. Saichō received Tiantai teachings and texts from them at Guoqing temple on Mt. Tiantai. Saichō also studied Chinese Esoteric Buddhism under two Chinese esoteric masters (ācāryas): Shunxiao and Weixiang, from whom he received initiation into the dual-realm mandalas. Furthermore, Saichō received Chan (Zen) teachings in China from the Oxhead (Jp. Gozu) school and Northern schools. He was a student of the Oxhead master Shunian (Shukunen), who resided at Chanlinsi (Zenrinji) Temple. Saichō also brought over the first copy of the Platform Sutra to Japan.

A number of notable monks contributed to Tendai thought and its history after Saichō, including:

- Gishin (義真, 781-833) – The second zasu (座主; "Head priest") of the Tendai School, who travelled with Saichō to China and ordained alongside him. He is the author of the Collected Teachings of the Tendai Lotus School (Tendai Hokkeshū Gishū)
- Kōjō (光定, 779- 854) – A direct disciple of Saichō as well as Kūkai. He helped establish the new ordination platform on Mount Hiei.
- Ennin (円仁, 794-864) – A direct disciple of Saichō who traveled to China to study further, who was the first to write scholastic works on the union of esoteric practices with exoteric Tendai School theories (this merger is now known as "Taimitsu"). He also promoted Chinese nianfo practices.
- Enchin (円珍, 814–891) – Gishin's successor, junior to Ennin. He traveled to China and studied further esoteric teachings with different masters there. He then worked to assimilate esoteric buddhism to Tendai, and was also a notable administrator.
- Annen (安然, 841–889?) - Ennin's disciple and successor to Henjō. An influential thinker who's known having finalized the assimilation of esoteric and exoteric buddhism within Tendai.
- Sō-ō (相應, 831-918), who developed the kaihōgyō ("circling the mountain")
- Ryōgen (良源, 912–985) – Annen's successor, and skilled politician who helped ally the Tendai School with the Fujiwara clan.
- Genshin (源信, 942–1017) – Famous for his writings on Pure Land Buddhism, particularly his Ōjōyōshū. Influenced Hōnen's Jōdo-shū tradition and later Tendai Pure Land.
- Sengaku (1203 – c. 1273) – a Tendai scholar and literary critic, who authored an influential commentary on the Man'yōshū, the oldest extant Japanese poetry.
- Shinsei Shōnin (1443–1495) – Founder of the Tendai Shinsei school, who promoted precepts and Nembutsu practice.
- Tenkai (天海, 1536–1643) – a Tendai dai-sōjō (大僧正; "archbishop"), who served as an entrusted advisor of Tokugawa Ieyasu, the founder of the Tokugawa shogunate.

=== Founders of new Kamakura schools ===
During the Kamakura period, numerous Tendai monastics founded new schools of Japanese Buddhism, today known as the schools of New "Kamakura Buddhism". All of them were initially ordained and trained at the Tendai center on Mount Hiei. Key figures include:

- Hōnen Shōnin (1133–1212): Founder of the Jōdo-shū school, who spread the Nembutsu practice based on Amida Buddha's Primal Vow.
- Eisai Zenji (1141–1215): Founder of the Rinzai Zen school, who introduced Linji Zen to Japan after studying in China.
- Shinran Shōnin (1173–1262): Founder of the Jōdo Shinshū school, who emphasized salvation through Amida Buddha's Other-Power.
- Dōgen Zenji (1200–1253): Founder of the Japanese Sōtō Zen school, who taught shikan taza (just sitting) meditation.
- Nichiren Shōnin (1222–1282): Founder of the Nichiren school, who propagated exclusive devotion to the Lotus Sutra.

== See also ==
- Enryaku-ji, the headquarters of Tendai Buddhism on Mount Hiei
- Hongaku
- Kaihōgyō
- Nichiren Buddhism, which developed the Tendai emphasis on the Lotus Sutra into a distinctive Japanese Buddhist school
- Tiantai Buddhism, the Chinese sect that Tendai developed from

== Primary sources in translation ==
- Chen, Shuman. "The Liberation of Matter: Examining Jingxi Zhanran's Philosophy of the Buddha-Nature of Insentient Beings in Tiantai Buddhism." PhD diss., Northwestern University, 2014. (Contains a translation of the Adamantine Scalpel by Zhanran)
- Yoshiko Kurata Dykstra (trans.) (1987). Miraculous Tales of the Lotus Sutra from Ancient Japan: The Dainihonkoku Hokekyōkenki of Priest Chingen. University of Hawaii Press.
- Dharmamitra, Bhiksu (Trans.) (2020). The Essentials of Buddhist Meditation. Kalavinka Press.
- Dharmamitra, Bhiksu (Trans.) (2017). The Six Dharma Gates to the Sublime. Kalavinka Press.
- Kubo, T., Longan, J. M., Abbott, T., Ichishima, M., & Chappell, D. W. (Trans.). (2006). Tendai Lotus Texts. BDK English Tripitaka Series.
- Ichishima, Masao (1983). Tʻien-tʻai Buddhism: An Outline of The Fourfold Teachings by Ch'egwan, Buddhist Translation Seminar of Hawaii.
- Pruden, L., & Swanson, P. L. (Trans.). (1995). The Collected Teachings of the Tendai Lotus School. BDK English Tripitaka Series.
- Pruden, L. M., & Rhodes, R. (Trans.). (1994). The Essentials of the Eight traditions, and The Candle of the Latter Dharma. BDK English Tripitaka Series.
- Reishauer, Edwin O. Ennin's Diary, The Record of a Pilgrimage to China in Search of the Law. New York: Ronald Press Co., 1955.
- Reischauer, A. K. Genshin's Ojo Yoshu: Collected Essays on Birth Into the Pure Land (Translation of Chapters 1 and 2)
- Stevenson, Daniel B.; Kanno, Hiroshi (2006). The meaning of the Lotus sūtra's course of ease and bliss: an annotated translation and study of Nanyue Huisi's (515–577) Fahua jing anlexing yi (PDF). Tokyo: International Research Institute for Advanced Buddhology, Soka University. ISBN 499806228X. Archived from the original (PDF) on 2015-05-12.
- Swanson, Paul L. (trans. and ed.) (2018). Clear Serenity, Quiet Insight: T’ien-t’ai Chih-i's Mo-ho Chih-kuan. 3 vols. Honolulu: University of Hawai‘i Press.
- Swanson, Paul. L. (1989). Foundations of T’ien T’ai philosophy: The flowering of the two truth theory in Chinese Buddhism. Jain Publishing Company. (Contains a partial translation of the Profound Meaning of the Lotus Sutra by Zhiyi)
- Tam, Lum Wai (1986). "A Study and Translation on the Kuan-hsin-lun of Chih-i (538-597) and its Commentary by Kuan-ting (561-632)"
- Thich Thien Tam (trans.). Ten Doubts about Pure Land by Tien Tai Patriarch Chih I
- Shih, Miao Guang. Annotated Translation of "Chapter on Bringing Together the Teachings of Tiantai and The Awakening of Faith in the Mahayana" (by Siming Zhili)
