= Gishin (monk) =

Gishin (義真, 781 – August 26, 833) was a Buddhist monk of the Tendai school in the early Heian period. His secular clan name is given as Mariko no Muraji (丸子連) or Mariko-be (丸子部). He was a native of Sagami Province and was also known by the title Shūzen Daishi (修禅大師, "Master of Cultivating Meditation").

== Biography ==
Gishin initially studied the Hossō school at Kōfuku-ji in Nara. He received ordination from a disciple of Jianzhen and became proficient in Chinese.

He later became a disciple of Saichō. In 804, he accompanied Saichō to Tang China as a translator. There, like Saichō, he received the perfect and sudden precepts (円頓戒, endonkai) from Daosui and esoteric Buddhist transmission from Shunxiao, after which he returned to Japan.

In 822, following Saichō's death, he became the first precept master (伝戒師, denkai-shi) to confer ordination at the Mahāyāna ordination platform on Mount Hiei. In 824, he was appointed the first head (座主, zasu) of the Tendai school. In 832, he became the first Tendai monk to serve as lecturer at the Vimalakīrti Assembly (維摩会, Yuima-e).

His works include the Tendai Hokke-shū Gishū (『天台法華宗義集』).
