= Annen (monk) =

Annen (安然, also known as 五大院 安然, 841–889?) was a Japanese Buddhist monk and scholar who systematized the esoteric teachings in the Tendai school, otherwise known as Taimitsu (台密). He thereby became the first to complete the formal esoterization of Japanese Tendai.

Annen also made notable contributions to the discourse on “original enlightenment” (本覚, hongaku) theory, particularly regarding the idea that “even grasses and trees possess Buddhahood” (草木成仏, sōmoku jōbutsu). His extensive writings, including six ritual manuals, played a crucial role in establishing new doctrines and organizing esoteric practices.

== Biography ==
Information about Annen’s life is sparse. Annen notes of himself that he originally came from the same clan as Saichō. At the age of nineteen, Annen was ordained as a Tendai monk, studying under the Tendai priest Ennin. He did not travel to China for study despite plans to do so, and never became head abbot (zasu 座主) of Mt. Hiei. There are disputes as to whether he completed the 12-year training at Mt. Hiei. In 884, Annen received the Dharma transmission from Tendai master Henjō (遍照). He was appointed abbot of Gankyōji (元慶寺) in 890, succeeding Henjō. Aside other teachers such as Tenkei and Enchin, Henjo was especially influential in Annen’s development, since he provided Annen access to all significant Taimitsu doctrinal and ritual teachings.

Little is known about Annen’s activities after 889 (age 49); the year in which Annen died is also contested. Scholarship places the date between 887 and 889 Additionally, there are later stories which give an account of Annen’s retreat into a state of infinite meditation in a cave in the year 915. These stories are similar to the accounts given of the monk Kūkai (空海). Annen was succeeded by Genjo 玄砰, (who was not certified due to Annen’s death), Daie (大慧), and Son’i (尊意).

== Writings ==
Annen was a prolific writer during his time; forty (out of the supposed more than one hundred) of his works are extant, although in some cases their authorship is dubious. Two of Annen’s most significant works include the Shingonshū kyōjigi (真言宗教時義, "On the Meaning of Teachings and Times in Esoteric Buddhism"), which emphasized the infinite temporal dimension of Buddha Dainichi's teachings, and the Taizō kongō bodaishin ryaku mondōshō (胎蔵金剛菩提心略問答抄, "Abbreviated Discussion on the Meaning of Bodhicitta according to the Womb and Diamond [Realities]"), a commentary on the Treatise on Bodhi Mind (菩提心論, Bodaishinron), traditionally attributed to the Indian master Nāgārjuna. Kūkai had employed the Bodaishinron to define esoteric Buddhism’s distinct qualities, and Annen’s commentary was later regarded by Edo-period scholars as being as comprehensive as Zhiyi’s monumental Fahua men’i (法華門義).

In addition, Annen employed the Yūgikyō (瑜祇経)—formally titled Kongōbu rōkaku issai yūga yūgikyō (金剛峯桜閣一切瑜伽瑜祗経), a text within the Kongōchōkyō corpus—in a distinctive way that highlighted its ritual significance. While Kūkai had also made extensive use of this text, he did not emphasize its ritual applications to the same extent. Annen’s interpretations had lasting influence on both Taimitsu and Tōmitsu traditions.

He also wrote extensively on the precepts and ordination of the Ritsuryō system. Annen’s interpretations had lasting influence on both Taimitsu and Tōmitsu traditions.

== Doctrine ==
Annen’s goal was to unite the various Taimitsu (Tendai esoteric Buddhism) doctrines of the contemporary Tendai school into one “true” esotericism that would encompass sectarian divisions and even the totality of the Buddhist experience. He presented a theory known as the “four ones” (shiichi kyōhan 四一教判), in which he stated that the Shingon view of the world consisted of one buddha, one time, one place, and one teaching. He thereby affirmed the suchness of all phenomena, and provided an absolute reading which encompassed all relative theories of Buddhist doctrines.

He also reinterpreted the precepts of the Tendai school in light of esoteric teachings. In the Futsu jubosatsukai koshaku (普通授菩薩戒広釈 ), Annen argued for a more lenient attitude towards monks who violated the precepts, arguing for instance that the transgressions should be considered in the context of the person’s whole life, and that the precepts could be violated for certain reasons. Scholarship suggests that Annen’s attitude towards the precepts was due to witnessing his master, Tankei’s violations of laws of sexual conduct, and subsequent defrocking. Additionally, it has been argued that Annen’s treatise contributed considerably to the decline of monastic discipline in the Tendai school.
