= Sōkan =

Buddhist ranking system

This is an article on Buddhist rankings. For the artist, see Yamazaki Sōkan.

Sōkan (僧官) is the Japanese system of rankings for clergy in Buddhism in Japan. There are three ranks, collectively known as Sōgō (僧綱), comprising ten categories or levels, followed by a series of titles known collectively as sōi (僧位). There is an abridged form for each of the three ranks; monastics or priests are often referred to by their rank rather than title.

== Ranks ==
The first rank, sōjo, consists of three levels:

- Dai-sōjō (大僧正)
- Sōjō (僧正)
- Gon-sōjo (権僧正)

The second rank, sōzu, has four levels:

- Dai-sōzu (大僧都)
- Gon-dai-sōzu (権大僧都)
- Shō-sōzu (小僧都)
- Gon-shō-sōzu (権小僧都)

The third rank, risshi, contains three levels:

- Dai-risshi (大律師)
- Chū-risshi (中律師)
- Gon-risshi (権律師)

Those monks could then earn the following titles, known as sōi:

- Hōin (法印) - Seal of the Law for the sōjo rank
- Hōgen (法現) - Eye of the Law for the sōzu rank
- Hōkyō (法橋) - Bridge of the Law for the risshi rank
