= Jūzenji =

Japanese god

- God of male sexuality, the placenta, and serpentine beings
- Member of One of the seven key emanations of Sanno Gongen
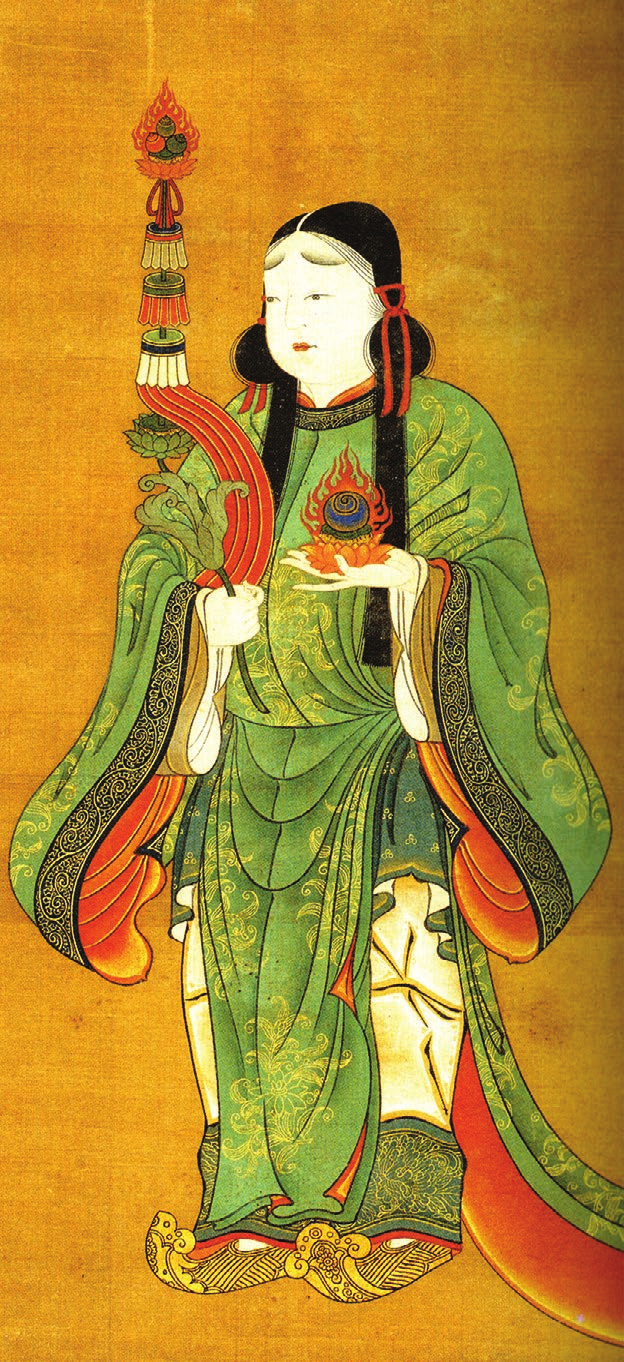
- Venerated in: Buddhism and Shinto
- Affiliation: Prince Shōtoku (affiliated with)
- Major cult centre: Associated with the shrine Hiyoshi Taisha, and the temple Enryaku-ji
- Age: Young boy
- Gender: Male

Equivalents
- Roman: Janus
- Buddhism: Benzaiten (considered a masculine equivalent), Jizō
- Shinto: Ninigi (linked closely)

Jūzenji (Japanese: 十禅師) is a Japanese deity associated with Hiyoshi Taisha and Enryaku-ji. He was worshipped as one of the seven key emanations of Sanno Gongen.

This powerful potent god was a benevolent miracle-worker, but at the same time, he was also an adorcist and mediumistic god, a malefic and wild god, a judge, a terrifying god who punishes and curses those who sin or do not properly worship him. He is a complex deity seen as ambivalent both cursing and blessing people. He is compared to Janus in his ambivalent nature. He was a god who conveyed oracles, not only appearing in people's dreams, but also possessing children and delivering oracles through them. He played a special role as a messenger of Sanno (Ōmiya (commonly considered the main Sannō line)), who connected the world of the gods with the human world, and its oracles were closely linked to Sanno Gongen. It is believed that He, being a divine child (Mikogami), acted as an agent to carry out punishments and curses in order to convey the will of his parent, Ōmiya.

Jūzenji has many other aspects, a placenta deity, an earthly god associated with serpentine beings (such as Ugajin), a companion deity worshipped in astral cults (Worship of heavenly bodies), and a god of male–male sexuality. He is normally depicted as a boy or a young monk His name derives from a government position that was prominent during the Heian period but had declined by the time his faith began; this position consisted of ten Buddhist monks.

He was repeatedly described as a divine entity that descended from the heavens. He came to be identified with Ninigi no Mikoto, the grandson of Amaterasu Ōmikami. Ninigi is a god who descended from the heavens when he was a child. This theory, which identifies deities from different systems, arose during the process of the fusion of Ise Grand Shrine and Sanno worship, and Ōmiya and Amaterasu Ōmikami were identified as each other's divided spirit (分身, bunshin) and similarly, Jūzenji and Ninigi-no-Mikoto were identified.

He was also identified with Jizo, who was considered a child at the time, thus reinforcing its identity as a child deity. These attributes ultimately led to Jūzenji being incorporated into the medieval cult of divine boys (童子信仰, dōji shinkō) and became associated with child deities who protected Buddhism, as well as the young regent Shōtoku Taishi. He is sometimes seen as having a close relationship with Shuten-dōji. This is emphasized with his link to white monkeys, the shinshi of Mount Hiei. He is sometimes identified with a masculine Benzaiten.

Tendai thinkers promoted Jūzenji to the highest supreme ontological status in their belief in Sannō Shinto, which was both Buddhism and Shinto. They considered Jūzenji to be an embodiment of the threefold truth (三諦, santai). They considered him a god who embodied the precepts, a god that was essentially superior to other divinities, and who functioned as the primordial substrate of reality, coterminous as he was with original enlightenment. And his liminal and ambivalent character gave him the role of redirecting the sinful sexual desires of the flesh into awakening.

== History ==
His name originates from the Naigubu Jūzenji (内供奉十禅師), a government organization established in 772 by Emperor Kōnin. In the 8th century, the ancient state took notice of mountain ascetics, believing them to possess thaumaturgical powers, and attempted to incorporate them into that. The dynasty of Emperor Kōnin permitted activities in mountains and appointed superior ascetics to Ten Masters of Practice (Jūzenji) system. This system was institutionally independent of Sōgō, the bureaucratic body that managed Buddhist monks and nuns. and consisted of 10 monks who oversaw matters related to Buddhist affairs at the court. They also provided care for the emperor during illness. It was believed that monks called jenzi (禅師) possessed supernatural powers (験力, genriki) gained through esoteric Buddhist training, and they performed healings by chanting Sanskrit dharanis. Later, jenzi came to refer to outstanding monks of the Zen sect.

This deity is an adorcist and mediumistic god, and from its inception, it is said to have possessed humans, spoken words, delivered oracles, and often manifested in human form. The name Jūzenji originates from a real person who was appointed to the position of Naigubu Jūzenji. This person was recorded as having been possessed by the Sanno deity and skillfully conveying the god's words.

As [Priest] Narinaka explained: “In ancient times, there was among the ten court chaplains one person who stayed at Kōshakuji in Yokawa, who was rich in wisdom and its practices and was a man of high virtue. This person among the meditation masters conveyed the spoken words of Sannō through his body. He had become a ‘manifest deity’ [arahito gami 荒人神], and for the first time he was given the name ‘Jūzenji.[1]

This is a passage from the Yōtenki (耀天記; 1223), written by a Shinto priest of Hiyoshi Shrine, and it emphasizes that this god is anthropomorphized as an Arahitogami, a category of divinities that materialize in human form. Those are human beings who became gods after death.

According to the medieval encyclopedia Keiran shūyōshū (渓嵐拾葉集) by Kōshū (1276-1350), when Saichō, the founder of Enryaku-ji, first climbed Mt. Hiei, he saw two supernatural beings. The first he saw was a heavenly boy, and the second was the emanation of the local mountain god Sannō. This story reveals that the boy is Jūzenji. It is said that the Tendai priesthood created the proverb, "The boy (chigo) is foremost, Sannō is second” (ichi chigo, ni Sannō (一児二山王)). This phrase soon came to mean that, ontologically, Chigo is the first and supreme being, surpassing Sannō. It was also believed that monks would fall in love with Chigo and make him an object of lust, but later tend to develop religious adoration for him. In the Tendai sect in Japan at that time, monks treated the boys who belonged to and served their temples (called chigo (稚児)) as objects of sexual desire. They considered Jūzenji to be incarnations of he the threefold truth was a concept first codified in China by the Tiantai monk Zhiyi. These interpretations combined, and Chigo came to be identified with Jūzenji, the god in the form of a beautiful boy. and Chigo as Jūzenji, came to be ranked higher than Sannō (Ōmiya), who was originally the supreme deity in Sannō worship. The proverb came to carry the connotation of condoning a monk having sex with a boy.

In the ritual that transforms the boys into special beings known as chigo, they are possessed by the Sannō, their bodies become Sannō's bodies, and their bodies are consecrated and deified. According to one document concerning this ritual, chigo were deified into three divinities: the cosmic buddha Dainichi, the bodhisattva Kannon, and the kami Sannō. Tendai Buddhist monks interpreted sexual intercourse with them as sacred intercourse with the Sannō Jūzenji, and considered it a path to enlightenment.

The Sange Yōryakki, written by Gigen during the Kamakura period tells of Saichō's first climb on Mount Hiei in 785. There, Saichō met a divine youth. This youth called himself the deity of destiny. He also said he was the divine child and Dōshōjin.

Tendai chroniclers like Kōshū have written about Jūzenji. They keep his complex nature in their writings. They avoid simplifying him into just a symbol.

Genshin, was a famous monk. He lived from 942 to 1017. His teachings describe Jūzenji. He said Jūzenji was centrally linked to the forces of the universe.

The Sannō Mitsuki offers a different view. It says Jūzenji has a dual role in Heaven and Earth. He is Kokūzō in heaven. On earth, Jūzenji is Jizō.

The Sange Sairyakki is another text. It talks about Saichō's meeting with the divine youth. This youth had three names. The first is Dōshōten. This means he was born with all beings. The second is Yugyōjin. He oversees the destiny of beings. The third is Jūzenji. He shares Zen's bliss and creates karmic ties.

The Sefurisan engi adds to the story. It suggests the youth Saichō met was Oto Gohō. Oto Gohō later protected Saichō on his trip to China.

He was sometimes identified as a serpentine deity linked to placenta and identified with Benzaiten.

According to the legend, Jien is said to have possibly had a homosexual love affair with Juzenji. In one myth every night he came to Jien in the form of a monkey and sat on his shoulder.

His popularity declined in the Edo period, and worship ended with the Meiji Restoration. His shrine at Hiyoshi sha was renamed Jugegū (樹下宮) and Kamo Tamayorihime no Mikoto came to be worshipped there as the wife of Ōyamakui no Kami.

== Link to Prince Shotoku ==
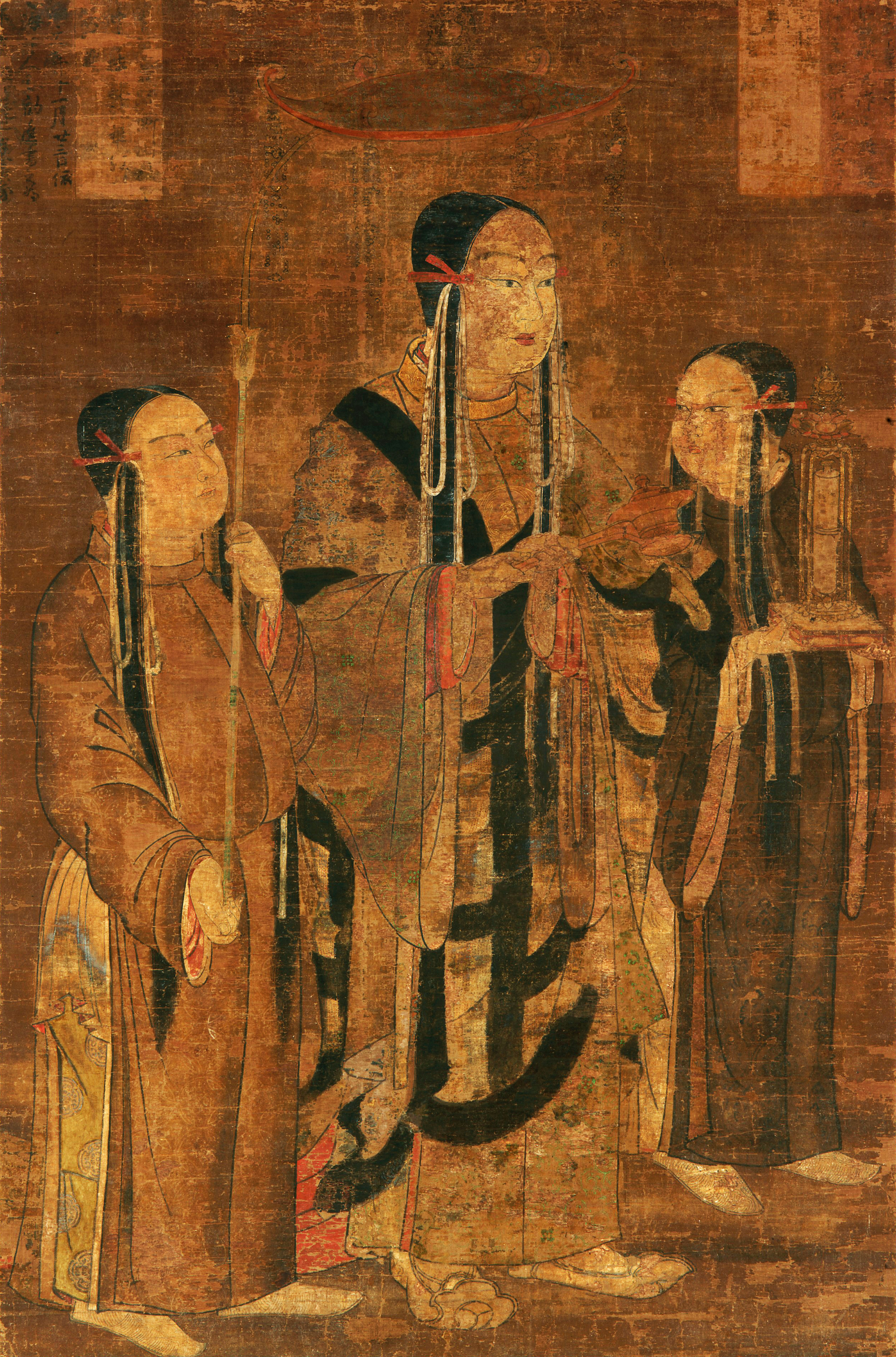
Shōtoku Taishi. 13th century

Jūzenji and Shōtoku Taishi share similarities. Shōtoku is often shown as a child. He represents the bodhisattva Kannon. In 1069, a ritual at Hōryūji focused on Shōtoku as a seven-year-old. This was different from the usual worship of Guze Kannon. This choice reflects the period's emphasis on youth. It was a time when puppet emperors were under cloistered emperors' control. It was also when Young Prince (若宮, Wakamiya) deities became popular. Such deities were generally linked to Prince Shotoku.

Jien, a poet, revered both Prince Shotoku and Jūzenji. He saw them as almost the same. Jien made many offerings at the Jūzenji shrine. In 1216, he dedicated a vow to Jūzenji and Shōtoku's mausoleum after a dream.

== Relationship with Daigyōji ==
Daigyōji is considered Jūzenji's uncle. He is known as an "evil god." He represents Japan's original jinushigami. By the thirteenth century, Daigyōji had a zoomorphic appearance. He is an avatar of Sarutahiko. Some medieval stories replace Ninigi with Jūzenji. The connection between Jūzenji and Daigyōji is explained in the Rō no miko ki. This text is about the origins of Jūzenji shrine mediums, known as the rō no miko. Sarutahiko and Daigyoji also have monkey associations.

== Artistic depiction ==
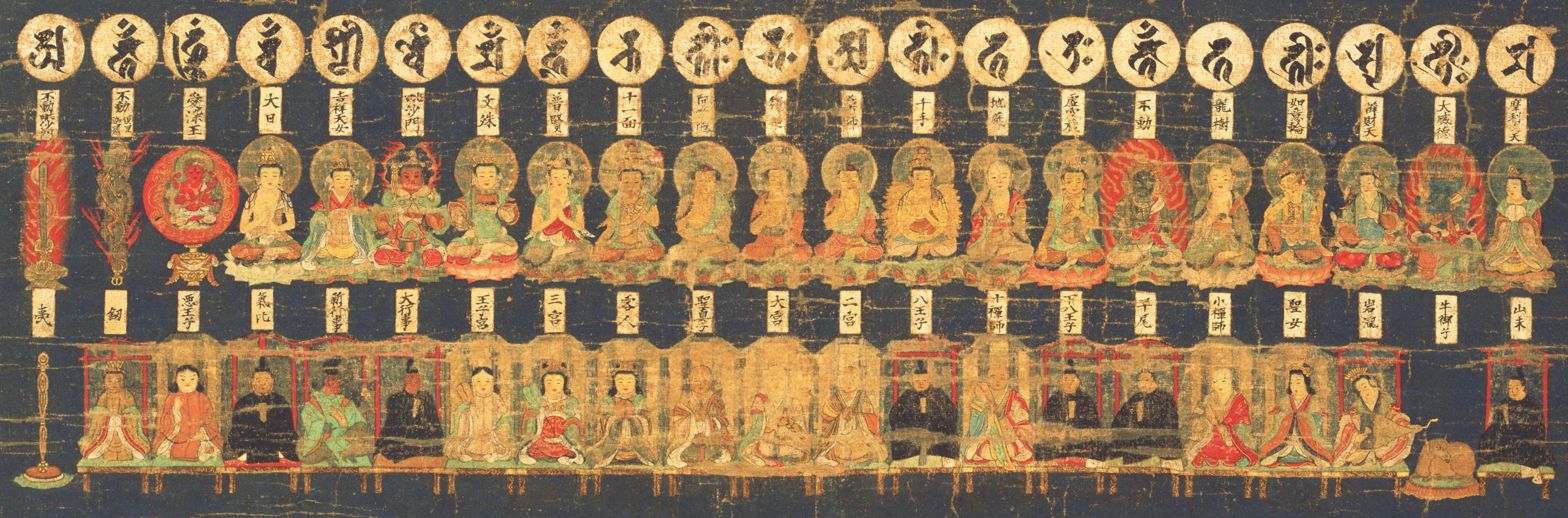
絹本著色日吉山王宮曼荼羅図（14th century）。Among the Sanno deities and Buddhas lined up in the image, the eighth from the right on the bottom row is the monk-like figure of Jūzenji, and the Buddha placed above him is Jizō, the Buddha corresponding to him.

Jūzenji is not often shown in art. When shown, he is usually a young or middle-aged monk.

In the Sannō mandalas, Jūzenji appears with other deities. One description shows him as a monk over twenty years old. He holds a scroll and a fan. Another source describes him as a respected monk in dreams.

One painting shows Jūzenji on a platform. A small monkey is climbing stairs towards him. Jizō is above him in a golden circle. The background shows rocks, trees, and Big Dipper. These stars represent the seven upper Hie shrines. Monks from Mount Hiei mostly worshipped this form.

Recently, images of Jūzenji as a youth have been found. There are a few examples. They show Jūzenji with similar features to Jizo. He has a wish-fulfilling jewel and a unique banner holder on a lotus stalk.

== In popular culture ==
The shrine of Jūzenji is a setting in The Tale of the Heike.

== See also ==
- Gozu Tenno
- Hachiman
