= Sannō Ichijitsu Shintō =

Syncretic shinto group

Sannō Shintō (山王神道) was a syncretic Shinto group with elements from Tendai Buddhism of Enryaku-ji Temple. Sannō (山王; “King of the Mountain”) is a common name of the guardian deity of Tendai Buddhism. The roots of the Shintō-Buddhist amalgamation (Shinbutsu-shūgō) that developed the belief in Sannō can be traced back to the early Heian period, when Buddhist monks regarded a number of Shinto deities (kami) as guardians of Buddhism. From the beginning of the Kamakura period (1192–1333), theories of that were formulated. The most important of the syncretic schools to emerge were Sannō and Ryōbu Shintō.

Its early modern doctrines that concern Tōshō-gū (東照宮) are specially distinguished as Sannō Ichijitsu Shintō (山王一実神道) or Ichijitsu Shintō (一実神道).

Sannō Shintō no longer exists.

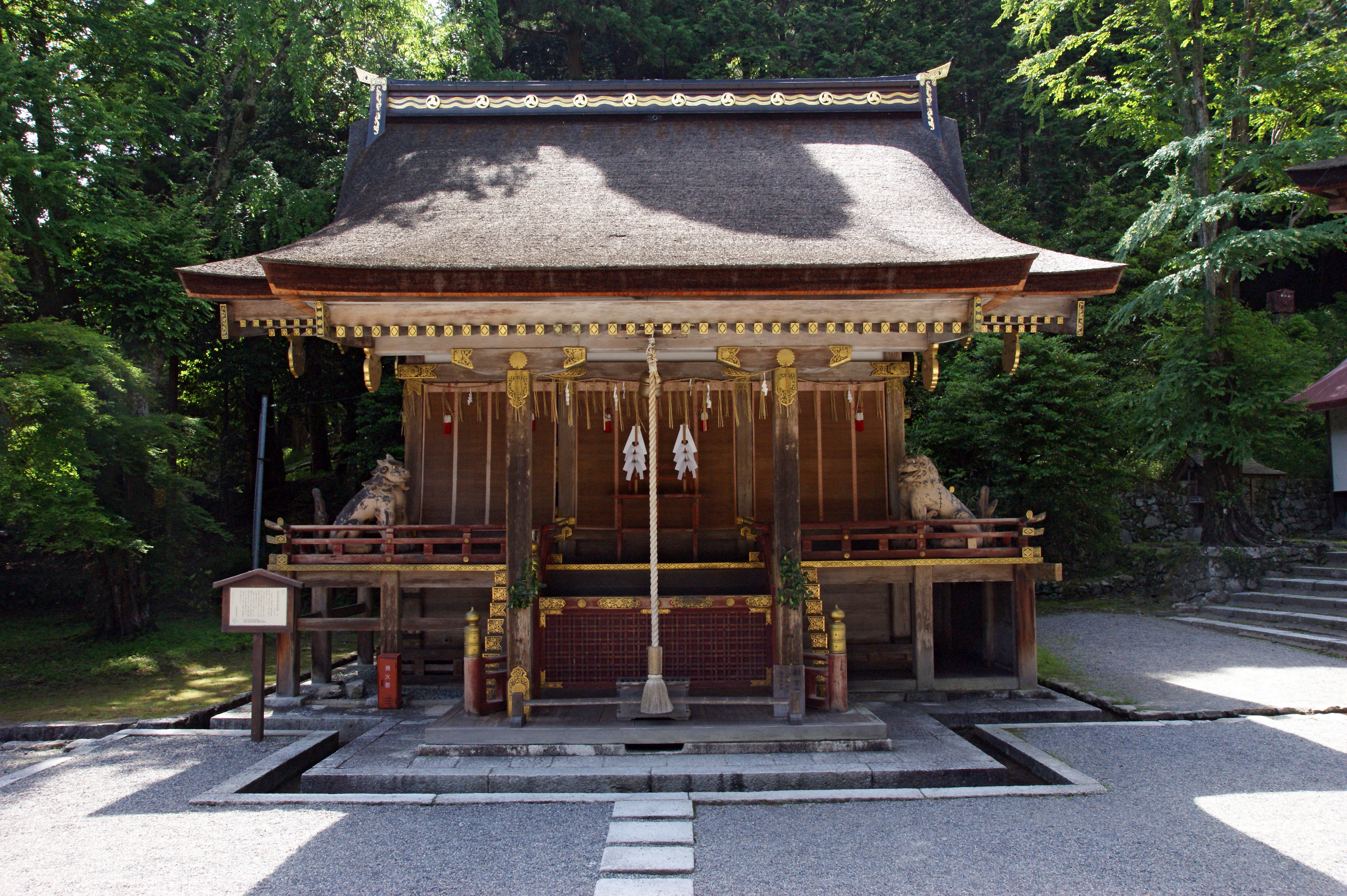
Hie Taisha, a Sannō Shintō shrine on Mount Hiei

Tendai doctrine allowed Japanese Buddhists to reconcile Buddhist teachings with the native religious beliefs and practices of Japan (now labeled "Shinto"). In the case of Shinto, the difficulty is the reconciliation of the pantheon of kami, as well as with the myriad spirits associated with places, shrines or objects, with Buddhist teachings. These gods and spirits were initially seen as local protectors of Buddhism.

Sannō Shintō was a Tendai branch of ranch of syncretic Buddhist-Shinto religious practice, and its central shrine, Hiyoshi Shrine on Mount Hiei, was composed of seven shrines, including those dedicated to the three deities known as the Sannō Sansei (山王三聖; "The Three Sacred [Deities] of Sannō").

Sannō Shintō was a specifically Tendai branch of syncretic Buddhist-Shinto religious practice, which revered kami called the Sannō or Sannō Sansei and was based on Hie Shrine (日吉社, Hie Sha) a shrine on Mount Hiei composed of seven shrines including those dedicated to the three deities known as Sannō Sansei. They are those enshrined in the Ōmiya (大宮), Ninomiya (二宮), and Shōshinji (聖真子) shrines.

These religious ideas eventually led to the development of a Japanese current of thought called honji suijaku, which argued that kami are simply local manifestations (the suijaku or "traces") of the Buddhas (honji, "true nature"). This manifestation of the Buddhas was explained through the classic Mahayana doctrines of skillful means and the Trikaya. Theories were also formed that identified gods from different systems as the same, and a network of gods was created. The theory arose during the process of the fusion of Ise Grand Shrine and Sannō worship, and Ōmiya and Amaterasu were identified as each other's bunshin (分身; "divided spirit") and similarly, Jūzenji and Ninigi no Mikoto, were identified.

Later, the god who was revered even more than Sannō Sansei was Jūzenji, who appeared in the form of a boy or young monk. This shift in the ranking of gods is seen as having the purpose of giving Buddhist justification to the Tendai monks' sexual relations with the boys who served at the temples.

In 1571, Oda Nobunaga attacked Enryaku-ji, and Hie Taisha was burned down along with the temple. The Shinto priests who managed to escape later rebuilt the shrine.

== Sannō Ichijitsu Shintō ==
Tenkai, an influential Tendai Buddhist monk, took over the medieval tradition of Sannō Shintō and advocated a new form of Sannō Ichijitsu Shintō in opposition to Yoshida Shintō. The rivalry crystallized around a concrete dispute: following Tokugawa Ieyasu's death in 1616, Tenkai clashed with Bonshun of Shinryūin and Sūden of Konchiin, both of whom argued for a funeral conducted according to Yoshida Shintō rites. Tenkai prevailed, and Ieyasu was consequently enshrined according to Tendai Sannō Ichijitsu rites, an episode regarded as the starting point of the modern debate over Shinto funerary ritual.Sannō Ichijitsu Shintō, based on the same Tendai thought as Sannō Shintō, was formulated in the early Edo period and was centered at Tōshō-gū, especially Nikkō Tōshō-gū to enshrine the spirit of is dedicated to Tokugawa Ieyasu (1542–1616). That formed the doctrine of Ieyasu as Great Radiant Deity of the East (東照大権現, Tōshō Daigongen). Sugawara says, Sannō Ichijitsu Shintō was a highly political religious system whose purpose was to legitimize and stabilize the rule of the Tokugawa house.

== See also ==
- Hiyoshi Taisha
- Sanno Gongen
