= Baedalguk =

Baedalguk may refer to:

- Baedalguk, another name of the Old Chosŏn according to Hwandan Gogi; the word baedal only became popular to call the country in 1909
- Baedalguk, another name of the Shinshi which appears in the Hwandan Gogi
