= Matsunoo Taisha =

Shinto shrine in Kyoto, Japan

Matsunoo-taisha 松尾大社
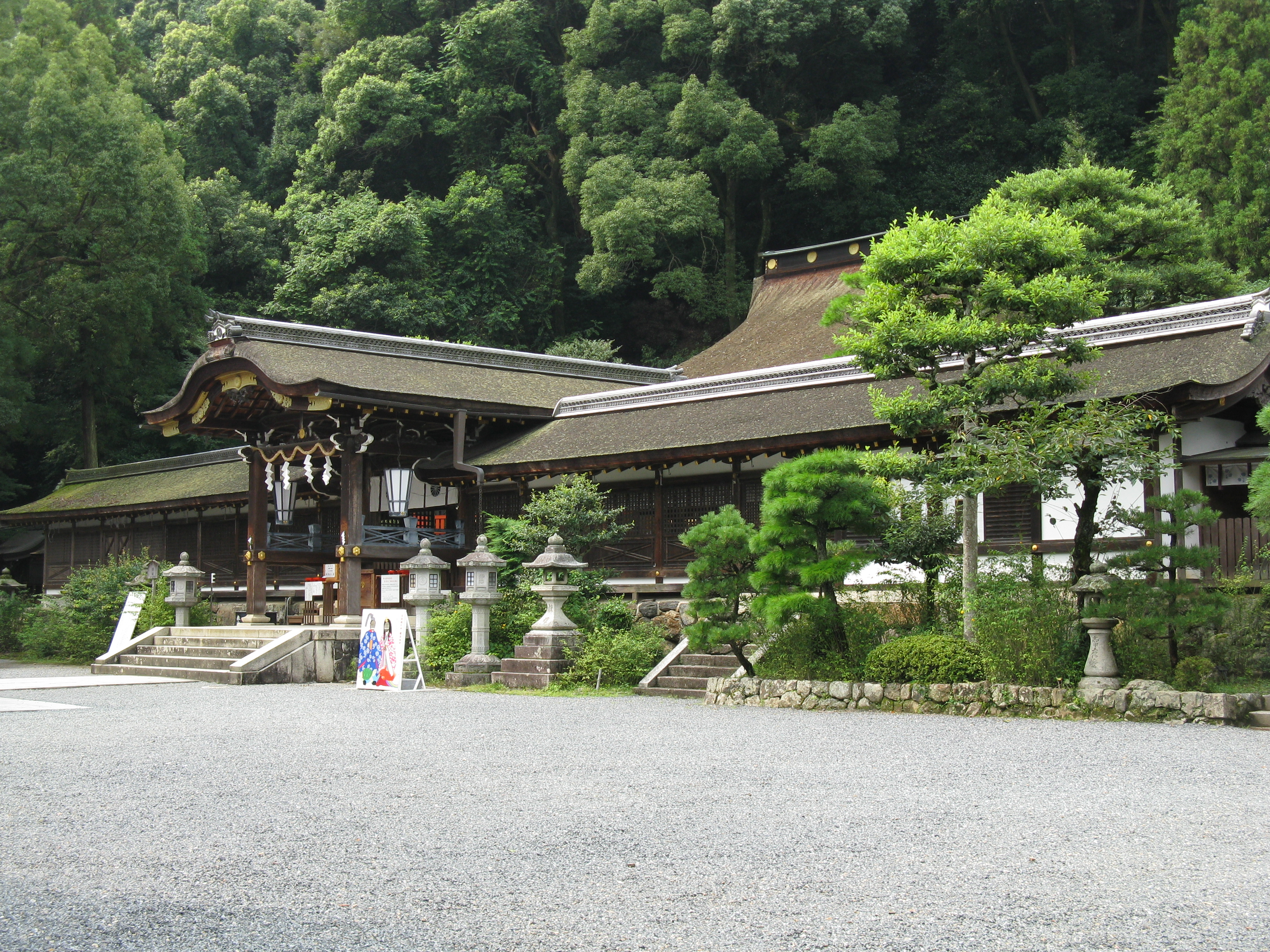
- The haiden, at Matsunoo-taisha

- Location within Japan

Religion
- Affiliation: Shinto
- Deity: Ōyamakui; Nakatsuhime; Tsukuyomi

Location
- Location: 3 Arashiyamamiya-chō, Nishikyō-ku, Kyoto, Kyoto Prefecture 〒 616-0024
- Coordinates: 35°00′01″N 135°41′07″E

Architecture
- Established: 701

Website
- www.matsunoo.or.jp

Matsunoo Taisha (松尾大社; Matsunoo Taisha/ Matsuo Taisha), formerly Matsunoo Jinja (松尾神社), is a Shinto shrine located at the far western end of Shijō Street, approximately 1.3 kilometers south of the Arashiyama district of Kyoto. It is home to a spring at the base of the mountain, Arashiyama, that is believed to be blessed.

It is said that during the move of the capital from Nara to Kyoto, a noble saw a turtle bathing under the spring's waterfall and created a shrine there. It is one of the oldest shrines in the Kyoto area, with its origins dating back to 700. The restorative properties of the spring draw many local sake and miso companies to the shrine to pray that their products will be blessed.

The shrine also serves gold leaf sake (金箔神酒, kinpaku miki) on New Year's Day for hatsumōde.

== History ==
The shrine became the object of Imperial patronage during the early Heian period. In 965, Emperor Murakami ordered that Imperial messengers were sent to report important events to the guardian kami of Japan. These heihaku were initially presented to 16 shrines including the Matsunoo Shrine.

From 1871 through 1946, Matsunoo-taisha was officially designated one of the Kanpei-taisha (官幣大社), meaning that it stood in the first rank of government supported shrines.

== Shofuen Gardens ==
After a new set of buildings was finished in 1973, modernist garden designer Mirei Shigemori was brought in to design new garden areas at Matsuo Taisha. Shigemori designed three new garden areas, which were completed in 1975:

- Kyokosui no Niwa 曲水の庭 (Garden of the Winding Stream) with a clear flowing stream in the style of the Heian period
- Jōko no Niwa 上古の庭 (Prehistoric Garden), a setting of large stones that references the ancient Mt. Matsuo shrine stone behind the shrine buildings
- Horai no Niwa 蓬莱の庭 (Garden of Horai), a garden referencing the land of Horai in Chinese and Japanese myth

The gardens at Matsuo Taisha were Shigemori's last project; his son, Kanto, supervised the final work after Shigemori's death on March 12, 1975.

== Images ==
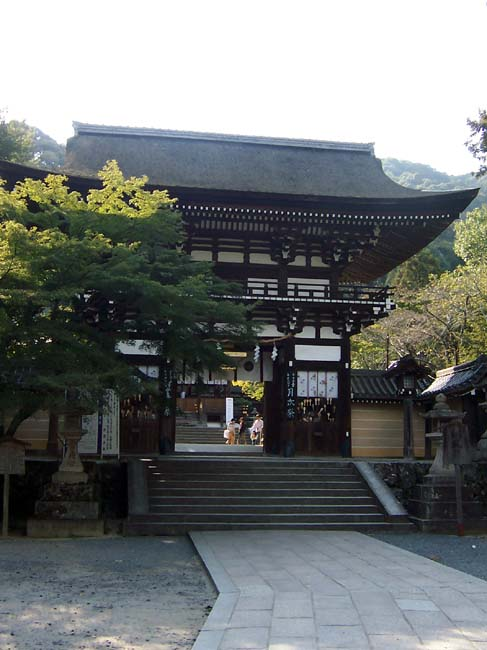
Front gate

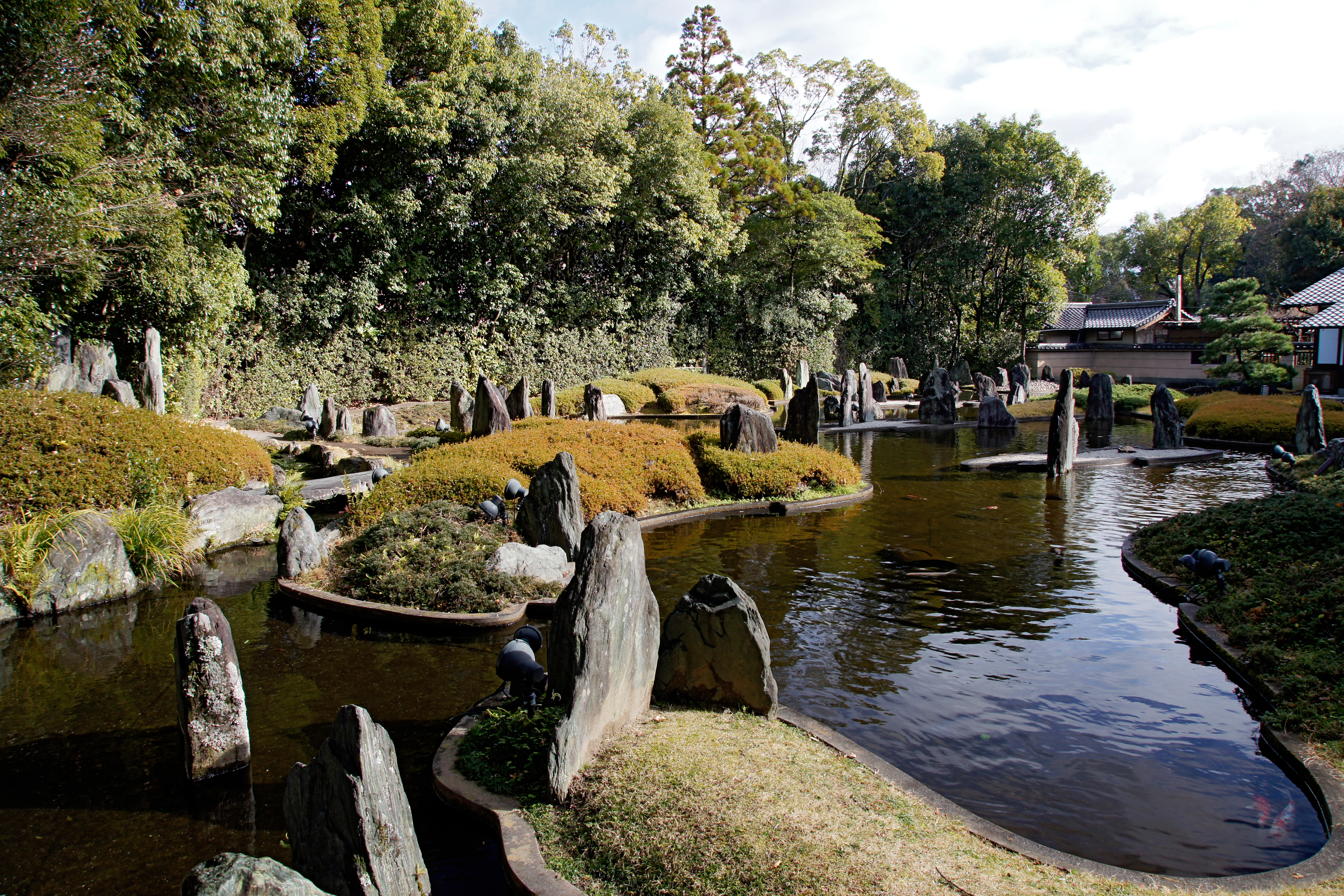
Horai Garden of Shofuen

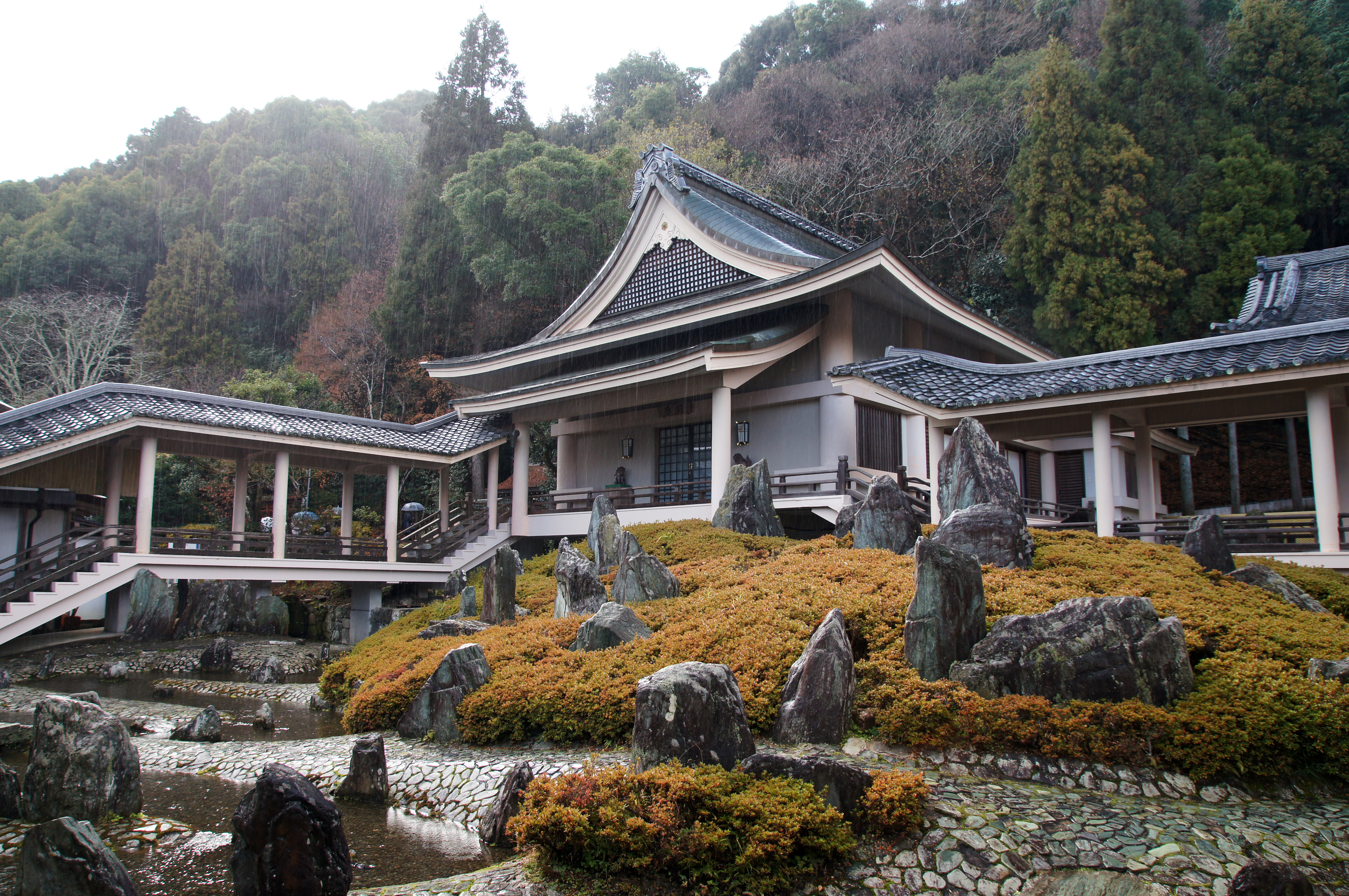
Kyokusui Garden of Shofuen

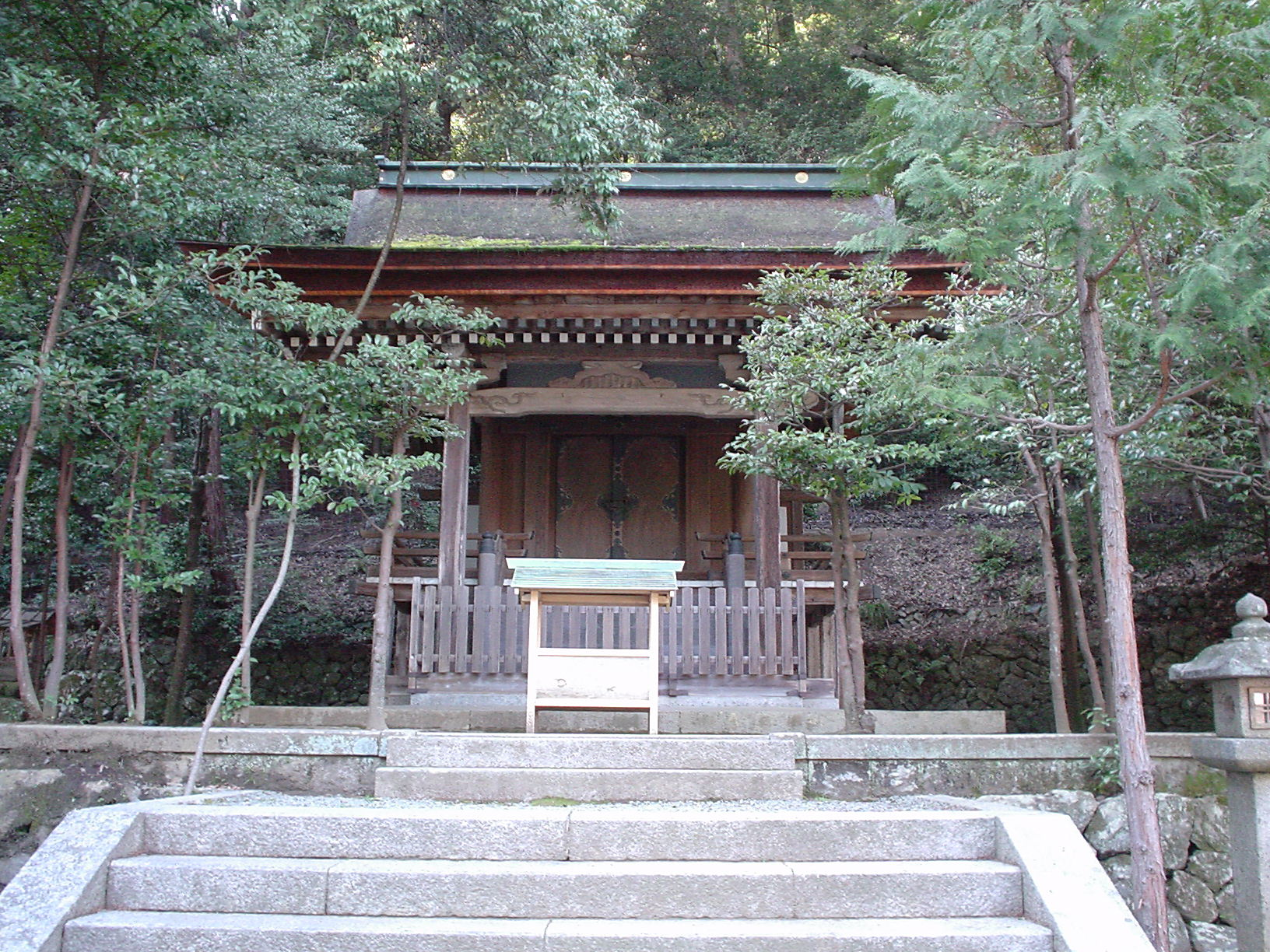
Shrine to Tsukuyomi

== See also ==
- List of Shinto shrines
- Twenty-Two Shrines
- Modern system of ranked Shinto shrines
