= Oyamakui no Kami =

Shinto-Buddhist deity

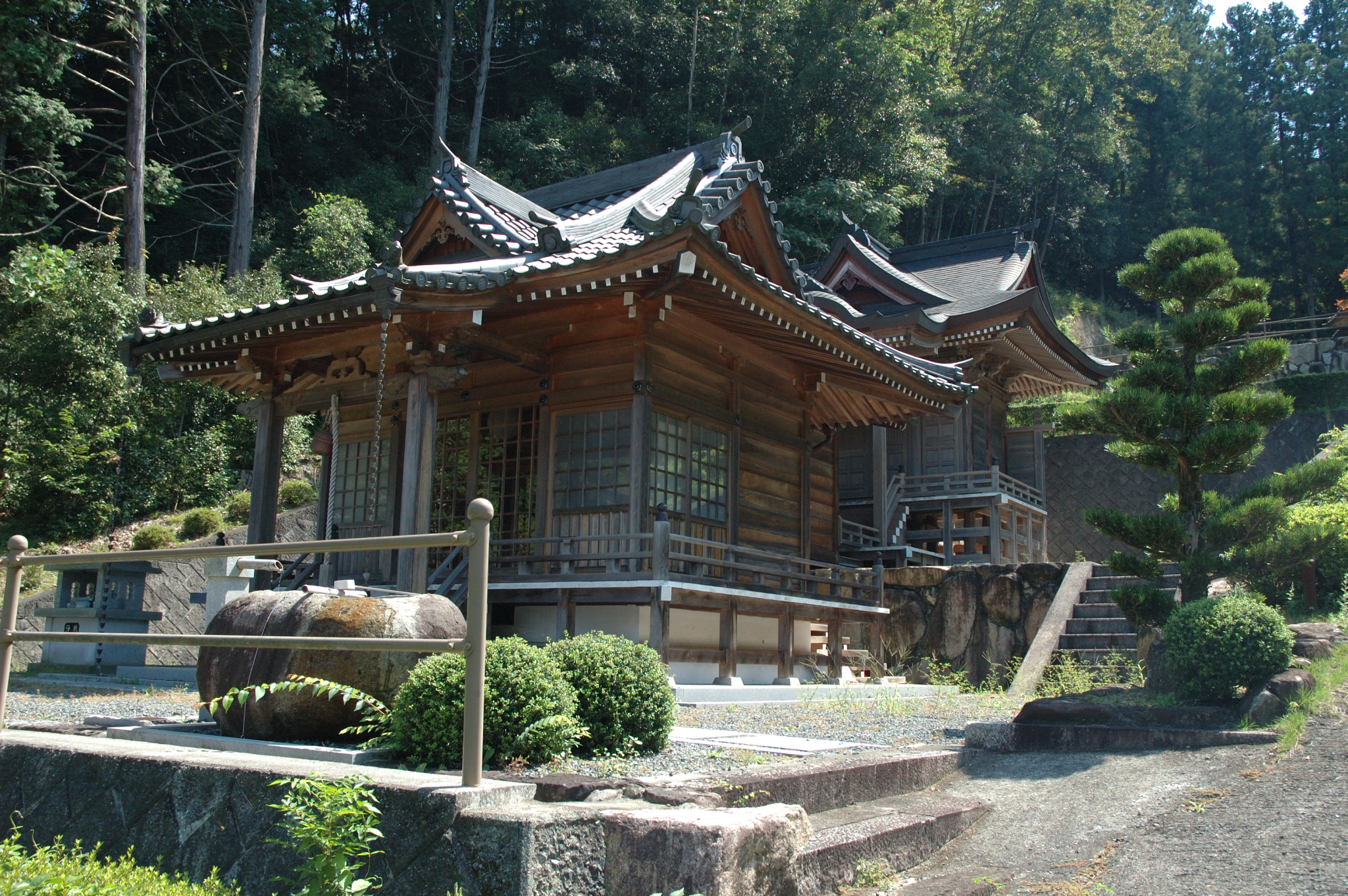
- Sannō Gongen Hall (Makiyama Hannyain Chōfuku Temple)
- Major cult centre: Hiyoshi Taisha; Matsunoo Taisha

Genealogy
- Parents: Toshigami (father)

Ōyamakui no Kami (大山咋神) is a kami. The Kojiki says they live on Mount Hiei in Ōmi Province or Mount Matsunoo (松尾) in Yamashiro Province. He is the child of Ōtoshi no Kami (大年神) and grandson of Susanoo. He and the other gods in the lineage of Ōtoshi no Kami are thought to be deities associated with agriculture and land. They are thought to be gods based on folk beliefs, or gods that symbolize the time and space governed by Ōkuninushi (大国主). Oyamakui no Kami is considered to be androgynous and possibly hermaphroditic. They are the kami of mountains and good health.

The name "Ōyamakui no Kami" is thought to be composed of "Ō" (大) and "Yamakui" (山咋). There are several theories regarding the meaning of "Yamakui" ("mountain stake"). These include the theory that it refers to the guardian deity of the mountain, the theory that it is a deification of the stake that marks the boundary of the mountaintop, and the theory that it is a deification of the sacred stake that is driven into the ground as a vessel for the gods during festivals held at the mountaintop.

He is worshipped at Hie Sha (Hie Shrine, 日吉社, now Hiyoshi Taisha) and its network of affiliated shrines, including Hie Shrine in Edo. It is also worshipped at Matsunoo Sha (now Matsunoo Taisha) Shrine and its network of affiliated shrines. Gods in the lineage of Ōtoshi no Kami include gods who came from overseas, which is why a connection to the Hata clan (秦氏) has been suggested. Kadono (葛野), where Matsunoo is located, was a region where the Hata clan held power, and the rituals of Matsunoo Shrine were performed by members of the Hata clan for generations.

He was considered the deity of Mount Ushio, a peak on the eastern ridge of Mount Hiei, also known as Kohie Mine (小比叡峰) or Mount Hachioji (八王子山), and he was called Kohie Kami (小比叡神) or Kohie Myojin (小比叡明神). He is enshrined in the Ninomiya (二宮, now Higashi Hongū, 東本宮), located east of Hie Sha. However, the highest-ranking deity at Hie Sha is not him, but rather the god of Ōhie Mine (大比叡峰) called Ōhie no kami (大比叡神) or Ōhie Myōjin (大比叡明神). He is Ōnamuchi no Kami (大己貴神), and is considered to be Ōkuninushi (大国主), Miwa Kami (三輪神, Ōmononushi, 大物主) in Yamato Province, and is enshrined in the Ōmiya (大宮, now Nishi Hongū, 西本宮), located west of Hie Sha.

Hie Shrine was under the strong influence of Enryaku-ji Temple, and in the latter half of the 9th century, Enryaku-ji Temple increased its interference in the rituals of Hie Sha. It is believed that the priests of Hie Sha, in an attempt to resist Enryaku-ji Temple, changed the deity enshrined in the second shrine from Ōyamakui-no-kami to Kuni no Tokotachi no Mikoto (国之常立神), an important deity in the Nihon Shoki. During the medieval and early modern periods, Shinbutsu-shūgō (神仏習合, "syncretism of kami and buddhas") beliefs flourished at Hie Sha, and the deities of Hie Sha, including the Ninomiya, were also known as Sannō or Sannō Gongen (山王権現). The deity of Ninomiya was called Ninomiya Gongen. It was believed that the true nature or other form of the deity of Ninomiya was Bhaisajyaguru (薬師如来).

Due to their prominence at Hie Sha, the Chinjusha of Enryaku-ji, the head temple of Tendai and the shrine itself leading Sannō Shintō (not Sannō Ichijitsu Shintō), Gods of Sannō have a very prominent role in the sect, often in the consolidated divinity of Sannō Gongen. They were highly significant in the Japanese religion of Sannō Shintō.

During the Meiji Restoration's separation of Shinto and Buddhism, many deities were abolished at Hie Sha, and many new deities were added to conform to the newly created system of gods. The deity enshrined at Ninomiya was also changed, with Ōyamakui-no-kami being worshipped again, and Kamo Tamayorihime no Mikoto (鴨玉依姫命) being added as his wife.

== History ==
There is debate about the origin of the kami with some saying they originated in Matsunoo Sha and others saying they originated in Hie Sha.

The first mention of the kami Oyamakui is recorded in the Kojiki, written in the 8th century CE, which states that this god resides at Mount Hiei, which is located immediately to the west of Hie Sha. The modern Hiyoshi Taisha Shrine claims that this kami was relocated from the summit of the mountain to their present location in the seventh year of the reign of the semi-legendary Emperor Sujin, or 90 BCE per the traditional calendar. However, the historical document Hoyoshi Sha Negi Kuden Shō (日吉社禰宜口伝抄) in which this theory is written is said to be a compilation of oral traditions from the priests of Hie Sha, but it has become clear that it was forged by Juge Shigekuni (樹下茂国), the priest of Hie Sha during the Meiji Restoration.

In 668 CE, Emperor Tenji decided to relocate the capital to Ōmi Province and built the Ōtsu Palace. At this time, the kami of Ōmiwa Shrine in Yamato Province (who served as protector of the imperial dynasty) was relocated as well, and was installed in the Ōmiya (大宮, now Nishi Hongū, 西本宮), whereas the original sanctuary came to be called the Ninomiya (二宮, now Higashi Hongū, 東本宮). However, this is likely a story that was created in later times.

In 788 CE, Saichō erected the Tendai Buddhist temple complex of Enryaku-ji on Mount Hiei. After the transfer of the capital to Heian-kyō, Enryaku-ji and by extension, Hie Sha came to be guardians of the spiritually vulnerable northeast quadrant from the capital. As Enryaku-ji became ever more powerful, and the Buddhist faith gradually amalgamated with Shinto under the Shinbutsu-shūgō policy, Hie Sha was subsumed into Enryaku-ji. As missionaries from Enryaku-ji built Buddhist temples all across Japan, they also spread the faith in the "Sannō Gongen" and the Hie kami.

The shrine became the object of Imperial patronage during the early Heian period. In 965 CE, Emperor Murakami ordered that Imperial messengers were sent to report important events to the guardian kami of Japan, and Hie Sha was added to this listing by Emperor Go-Suzaku in 1039. This unique number of Imperial-designated shrines has not been altered since that time. In 1571, Oda Nobunaga burned down Hie Sha along with Enryaku-ji Temple on Mount Hiei. The Ōmiya (大宮, now Nishi Hongū) was reconstructed in 1586 and the Ninomiya (二宮, now Higashi Hongū) in 1595. Tokugawa Ieyasu also had faith in the Sannō Gongen and the shrine was supported by the Tokugawa shogunate.

== Kamo Tamayorihime no Mikoto ==
During the Meiji era, Hie Sha changed many of its enshrined deities, making Kamo Tamayorihime no Mikoto the wife of Ōyamakui no Kami. In the modern Hiyoshi Taisha, she is the enshrined deity of Juge Gū, where the Juzenji (十禅師) was worshipped, and of Sannomiya Gū (三宮宮), where Kashikone (惶根) was worshipped. The basis for the claim that she was originally a deity enshrined at Hie Sha is a historical document Hoyoshi Sha Negi Kuden Shō (日吉社禰宜口伝抄) forged during the Meiji Restoration, which is believed to have been intentionally created by Juge Shigekuni (樹下茂国). She is a deity of the Kamo clan's Kamo Shrine. According to the Yamashiro no Kuni Fudoki (山城国風土記, a historical and geographical record of Yamashiro Province), she found an arrow on the banks of the Kamo River, which was actually an arrow in which Yakusanoikazuchi (火雷神) had transformed. When she brought it home, she miraculously became pregnant and gave birth to Kamo Wakeikazuchi no Mikoto (賀茂別雷命) with him. The priests of Hie Sha are descendants of the Kamo clan. The modern Hiyoshi Taisha claims that Kamo Wakeikazuchi-no-mikoto is the child of Ōyamakui no Kami and Kamo Tamayorihime no Mikoto, and the modern Sannō Festival depicts the marriage of the two and the birth of Kamo Wakeikazuchi no Mikoto. According to traditional beliefs, the deity of the Ōmiya, not the Ninomiya, was identified with the deity of Kamo Shrine, who was her husband.

== See also ==
- Sannō torii
