= Mirei Shigemori =

Japanese landscape architect (1896–1975)

- 重森 三玲
- Born: 1896; Kayō, Jōbō District, Okayama Prefecture, Japan
- Died: 1975 (aged 78–79); Kyoto, Japan
- Education: Tokyo Fine Arts School
- Occupations: Landscape architect, artist, historian
- Notable work: Tōfuku-ji, Matsunoo-taisha
- Spouse: Reiko Shigemori
- Children: 5

Mirei Shigemori (重森三玲, Shigemori Mirei; 1896–1975), was a Japanese landscape architect and historian of Japanese gardens.

== Life and career ==
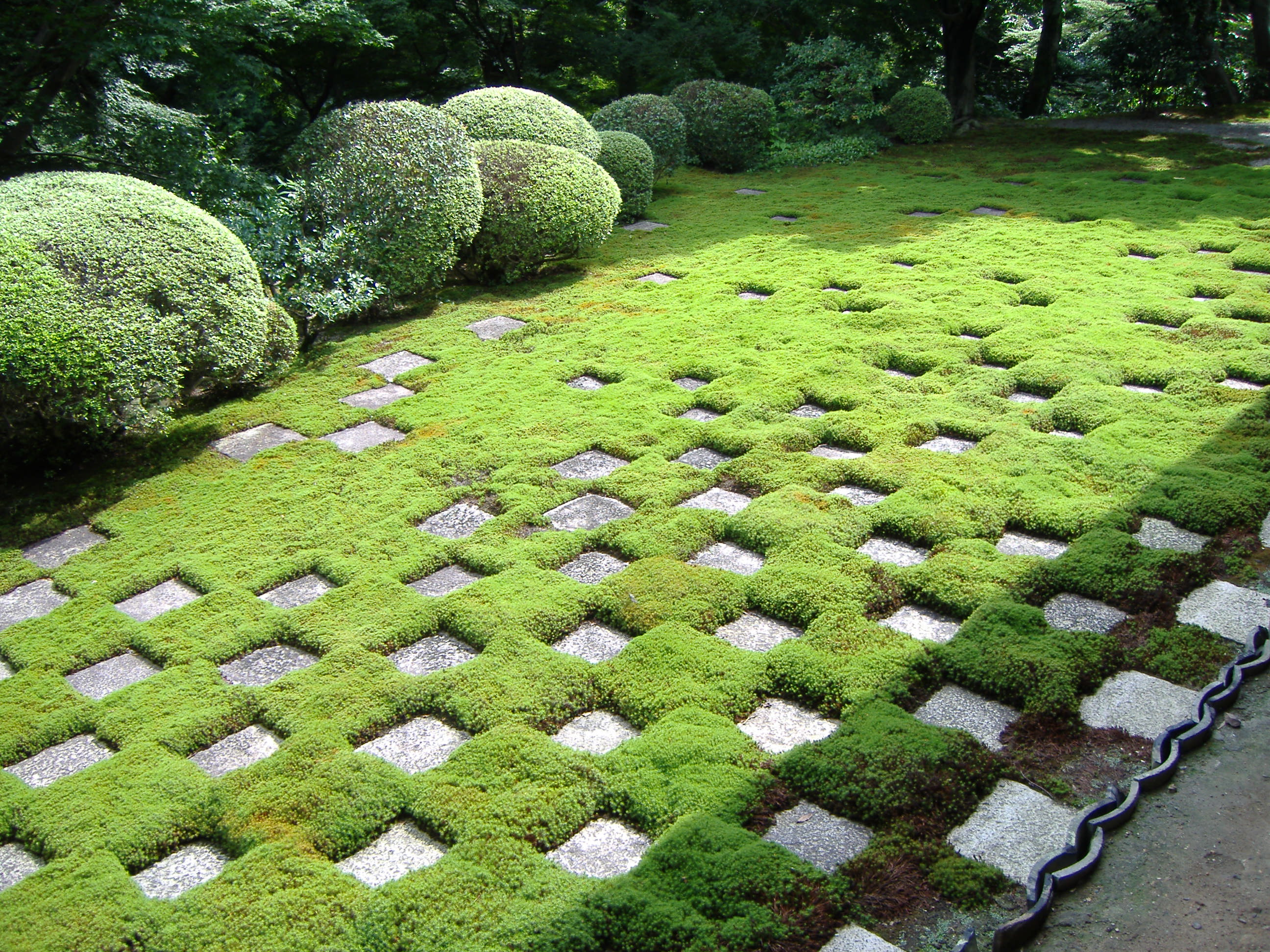
Moss garden at Tōfuku-ji (1939)

Mirei Shigemori was a garden designer who actively participated in many areas of Japanese art and design. Shigemori was born in Kayō, Jōbō District, Okayama Prefecture, and in his youth was exposed to lessons in traditional tea ceremony and flower arrangement, as well as landscape ink and wash painting. In 1917, he entered the Tokyo Fine Arts School to study nihonga, or Japanese painting, and later completed a graduate degree from the Department of Research. In the early 1920s, he tried extensively to found a school of Japanese Culture, Bunka Daigakuin to synthesize the teaching of culture, but was foiled by the 1923 Great Kantō earthquake, which forced him to move back to his hometown near Kyoto.

He also intended to create a new style of ikebana, or flower arrangement, and produced art criticism and history writings, including the Complete Works of Japanese Flower Arrangement Art published in 1930, and the New Ikebana Declaration written with Sofu Teshigahara and Bunpo Nakayama in 1933. Throughout his later gardening career, he maintained a voice in avant garde criticism of ikebana through publishing Ikebana Geijutsu magazine beginning in 1950, and through the founding of an ikebana study group called Byakutosha in 1949.

At the same time, he cultivated an interest and knowledge in traditional Japanese gardens. He co-founded the Kyoto Rinsen Kyokai with others in 1932. After the destruction caused by the Muroto typhoon in 1934, he began a survey of significant gardens in Japan. In 1938, he finished publishing the 26-volume Illustrated Book on the History of the Japanese Garden, a meticulous documentation of major gardens in the country which he revised in 1971, shortly before his death.

He began practicing as a garden designer in 1914 with a garden and tea room on his family’s property. His first major work was a design for the garden at Tofuku-ji Temple in 1939. He designed 240 gardens, and worked mostly in karesansui, or dry landscape gardens. Many of his gardens are on existing religious sites, but a few of his works are in cultural or commercial settings. He also collaborated with Isamu Noguchi in choosing stones for the UNESCO Garden in Paris.

== Design philosophy ==
Shigemori’s work and writings reflect and interface with the changing political and cultural framework of Japan during his life. Kendall Brown, in his preface to Mirei Shigemori: Rebel in the Garden notes that “Shigemori embodies the central artistic quest of his era – a new direction in Japanese creativity founded on the desire to overcome a fundamental tension between the perceived polarities of dynamic Western Culture and the relative stasis attributed to the Asian tradition.”

He was trained in nihonga, or Japanese painting, and drew on the traditional arts of ikebana (flower arrangement), and chadō (tea ceremony), and Shinto, Buddhist, and Taoist cosmological ideas in his work. At the same time, his work is closely tied to theories of the Primitive Modern explored by artists and architects like Isamu Noguchi, Kenzo Tange, and ikebana artists Sofu Teishigahara and Shuzo Takiguchi. This movement drew on the energy of Japanese prehistoric arts of the Yayoi and Jōmon periods, and allowed artists to “radicalize existing practices within the Japanese framework and thereby transcend the dichotomy of Japanese ‘tradition’ and western ‘modernity’.” In his gardens, Shigemori recovers the primordial power that the Shinto tradition attributed to nature, yet works as a modernist artist-hero to innovate a traditional Japanese garden typology.

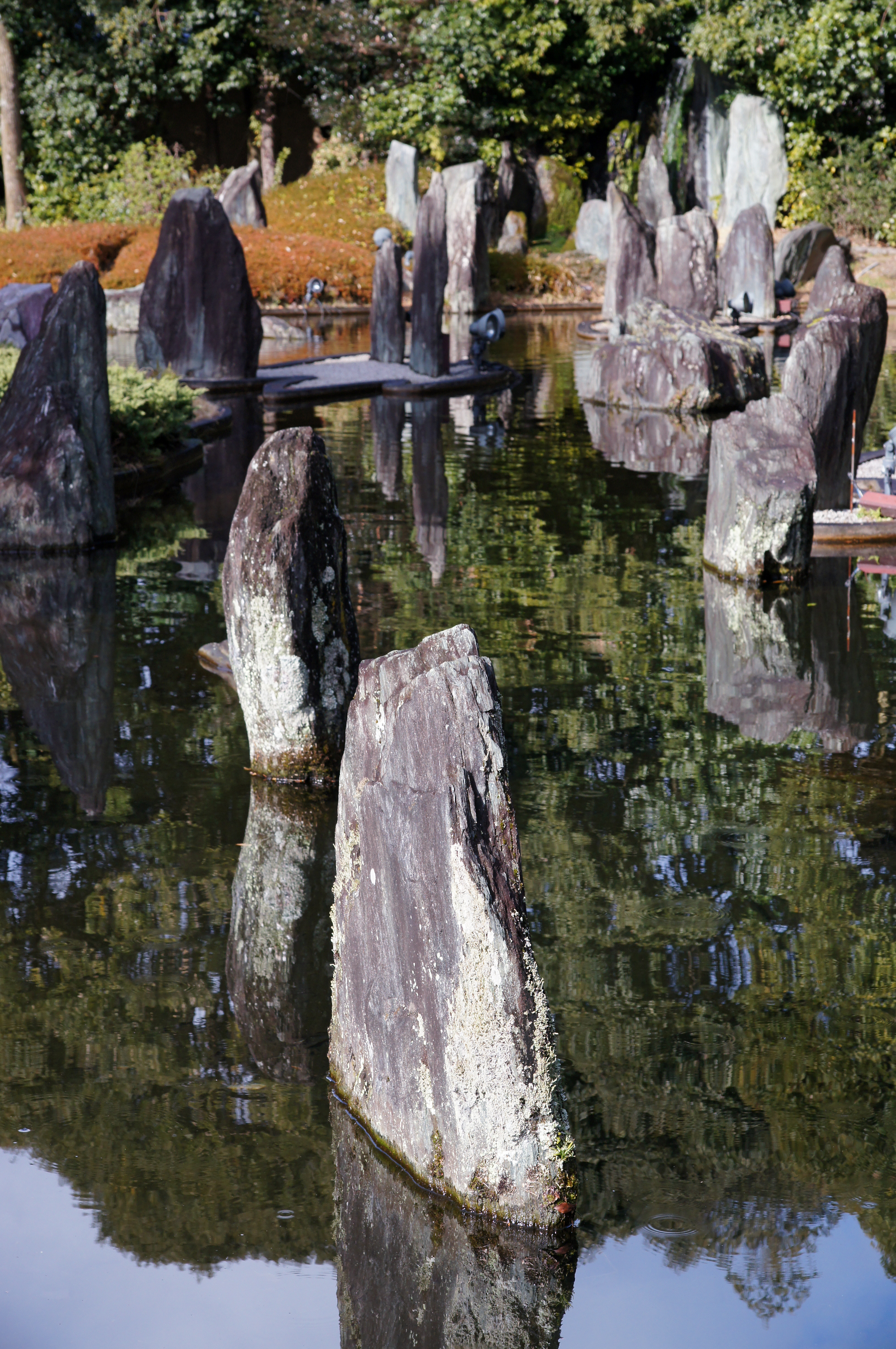
Horai Garden, Shofuen of Matsunoo-taisha, Kyoto 1975

The text he wrote in 1971, titled the Shin Sakuteiki, summarizes his attitudes towards Japanese garden making in the 20th century. He noted that contemporary approaches to Japanese landscape design gravitated to two extremes. Traditionalists revered the built cultural environment, and strictly imitated their forms, and hoped that the use of these forms would “restore the values, ethics, and behaviors of the past.” On the other hand, modernists saw the past as a relic, or obstacle to be discarded, and old forms were seen as a “negative against which to measure progress.” In his argument, Shigemori argued for a hybrid approach, in which the past would inform and give cultural resonance to present developments in form. He advocated for studying the past masters, and that designers should “emulate their way to invention rather than the results achieved, (so) gardenmakers could distill the most valuable inspiration for their work.” Shigemori’s work reflects this idea of culturally grounded innovation.

Shigemori was greatly influenced by Western culture in his Japanese garden design. The modernist movement which arrived in Japan during the 1920s and 1930s had a profound impact on his approach to design. “In Shigemori’s experience, exploration of the Western avant-garde and Japanese pre-modern culture played equally large roles.” While continuing his graduate degree Shigemori studied contemporary aesthetics, art history and philosophy. This would greatly influence Shigemori and his design approach for the rest of his life. At the age of 29, Shigemori changed his first name from Kazuo to Mirei the Japanese pronunciation for Francois Millet, a French landscape painter. During this period, Shigemori was still working in other mediums such as ikebana. During the Showa period (1925 onward), Shigemori advocated a new approach to the arrangements of flowers. Traditional ikebana arrangements aspired to imitate nature, known as naturalism. His new style attempted to mimic the surrealist movements found in western cultures at the time while still rooted in Japanese aesthetics. Throughout Shigemori’s career, regardless of medium he persistently questioned the traditional norms. The extreme to traditional arts would have been to advocate the modernist movement. In that approach designers and artist abandon design traditional Japanese philosophies and attempted to recreate Western aesthetics. Instead Shigemori embraced a balance between the past and modernist movement. He resisted the trend in the Japan at the time that advocated completely Western and modern approach to design.

As Shigemori became more interested in Japanese garden design, he meticulously surveyed and researched 242 gardens in Japan. His findings were published in 1938 as a collection called Illustrated Book on the History of the Japanese Garden. Upon completing his research, Shigemori started to apply his own aesthetics to garden design. Shigemori believed that Japanese garden design had stopped evolving since the Edo Period (1600-1868), and resolved to modernize the medium. His first major work was at Tofu-kuji Temple in Kyoto. Within the gardens Shigemori blended traditional garden design with more contemporary concepts. The gardens of Tofu-kuji have strong elements of cubism and surrealism in particular in the use of stone. The stones consisted of square cubes, creating a checker pattern as well as round stone pillars which replaced naturally shaped stone. While at first glance the gardens appear to have abandoned traditional constraints, the design upon closer examination highlight an evolution of aesthetics. Shigemori continued to be a prolific designer and scholar until his death in 1975. His philosophical approach to Japanese garden design reinterpreted foreign influences to breathe new vitality to a traditional medium. He took uniquely Western design aesthetics and created an evolved Japanese garden.

He spoke extensively of the growing estrangement between people and the primordial power of nature, and his gardens are full of hybrid symbols that seek to reveal the cultural and natural histories their sites. Traditional garden forms are reinterpreted with modern materials and attempt to reengage the viewer with the ever developing continuum of Japanese culture.

== Major projects ==
- Kasuga Taisha, 1934
- Tōfuku-ji Hojo, 1939
- Kishiwada-jo, 1953
- Maegaki Residence, 1955
- Kogawa Residence, 1958–65
- Zuiho-in, 1961
- Kōzen-ji, 1963
- Ryogin-an, 1964
- Kitano Bijutsukan, 1965
- Sumiyoshi Shrine, 1966
- Sekizo-ji, 1972
- Yurin no Niwa, 1969
- Tenrai-an, 1969
- Ashida Residence, 1971
- Hōkoku Shrine, Tamba, Hyōgo 1972
- Fukuchi-in, 1973
- Matsunoo-taisha, in Matsuo, Kyoto, 1975

== Books by Shigemori translated into English ==
- Shigemori, Mirei. Gardens of Japan. Vol. 1. Kyoto: Nissha, 1949.
- Shigemori, Mirei and Hashizume Mitsuharu. The Art of Flower Arrangement in Japan. Kyoto: Kasuke Murakami, 1933.
