= Hiyoshi Taisha =

Shinto shrine in Shiga Prefecture, Japan

Hiyoshi Taisha 日吉大社
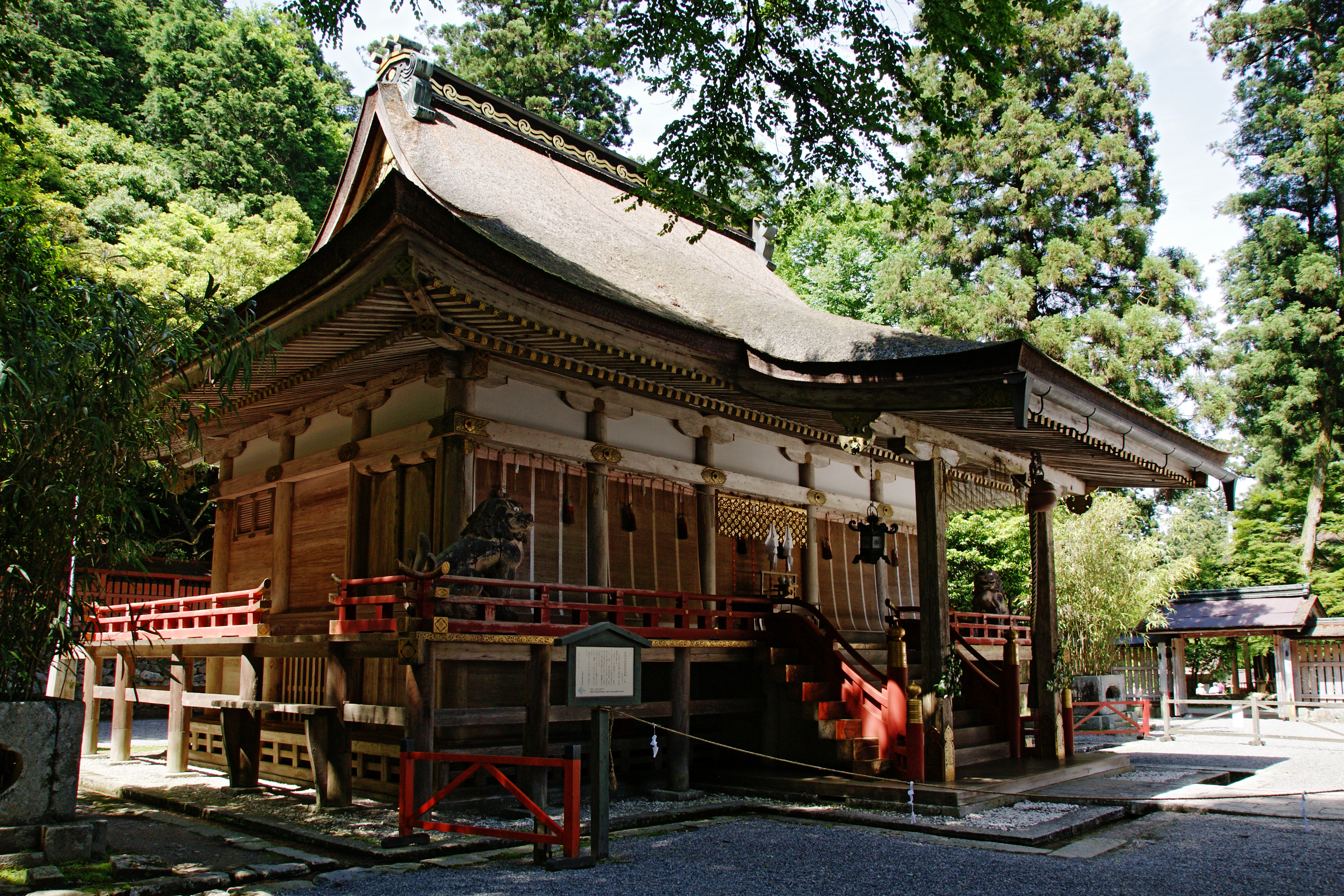
- Nishi Hongū (West Hall of Worship) Honden

- Location within Shiga Prefecture Location within Japan

Religion
- Affiliation: Shinto
- Deity: Ōkuninushi, Oyamakui no Kami

Location
- Location: Ōtsu, Shiga Prefecture, Japan.
- Interactive map of Hiyoshi Taisha 日吉大社
- Coordinates: 35°4′24.4″N 135°51′53.9″E

Architecture
- Style: Hiyoshi-zukuri
- Established: pre-Nara period

Website
- Official website

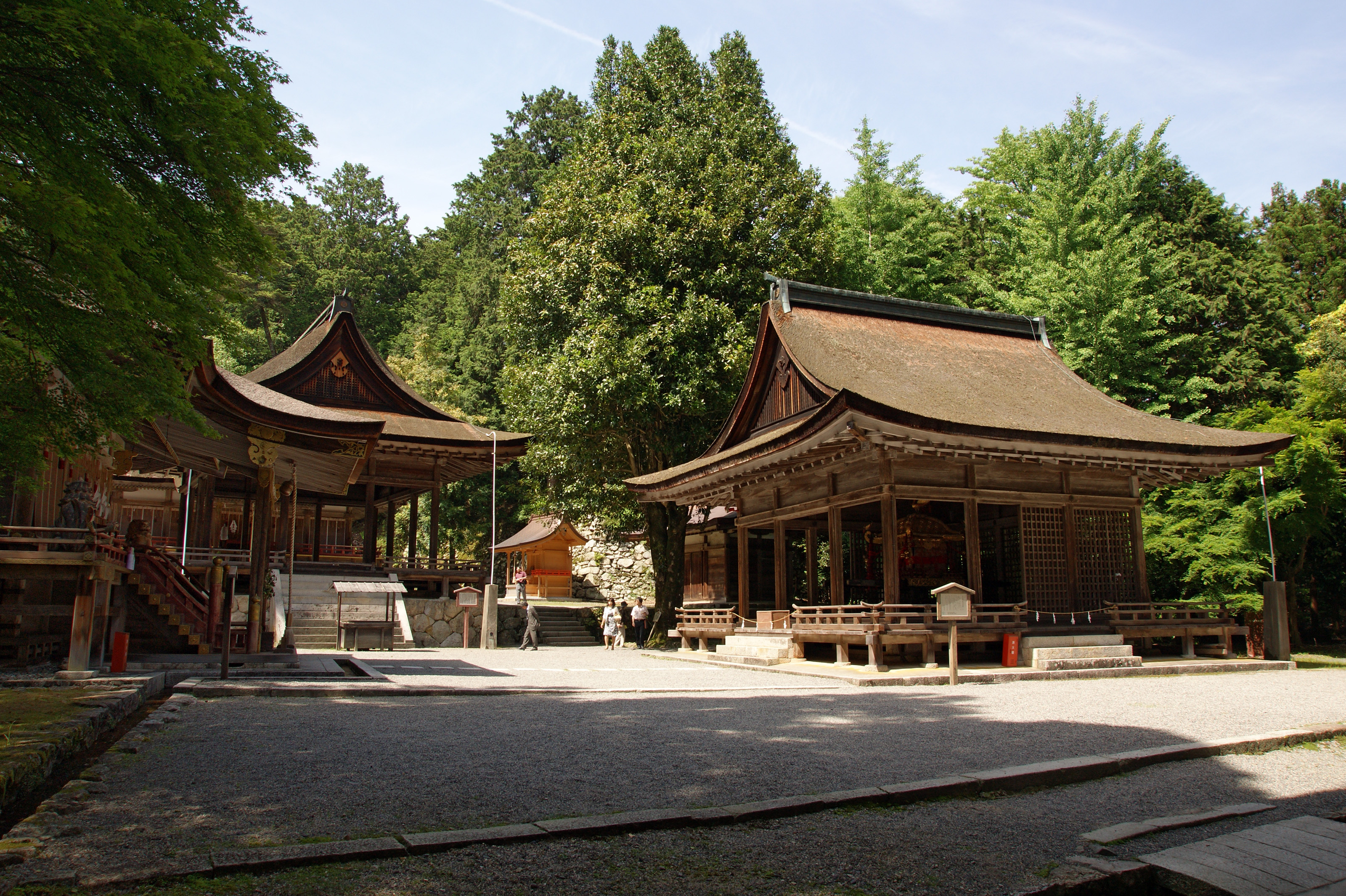
Higashi Hongū (East Hall of Worship)

Hiyoshi Taisha (日吉大社) is a Shinto shrine located in the city of Ōtsu, Shiga Prefecture Japan. This shrine is one of the Twenty-Two Shrines. Known before World War II as Hiei Taisha (日枝大社) or Hie jinja, "Hiyoshi" is now the preferred spelling. It was also known as the Sanno Gongen (山王権現). The head shrine in Ōtsu heads the seventh largest shrine network in Japan, with approximately 3800 Hiyoshi, Hie, and Sannō shrines nationwide. Torii of this shrine have a distinctive configuration, known as the "Sannō torii", with a triangle-shaped element above the main crossbeam. The 400,000 square meter precincts centered is designated as a National Historic Site, and the east and west main shrine buildings, the Nishi Hongū (西本宮) and Higashi Hongū (東本宮) are designated as National Treasures, and many of the structures in the precincts are designated as National Important Cultural Properties.

== Enshrined kami ==
Main shrine

- Nishi Hongū: Ōnamuchi (大己貴神)
- Higashi Hongū: Ōyamakui (大山咋神)

Subsidiary shrines

- Ushio-gū: Ōyamakui aramitama (大山咋神荒魂)
- Juge Jinja: Tamakushi-hime (鴨玉依姫命)
- Sannomiya-gū: Tamakushi-hime aramitama (鴨玉依姫命荒魂)
- Usa-gū: Takiri-hime (田心姫神)
- Shirayama-gū: Kikurihime (白山姫神, Shirayama-hime)

== History ==
The first mention of the kami Oyamakui is recorded in Kojiki, written in the 8th century AD, which states that this god resides at Mount Hiei, which is located immediately to the east of Hiyoshi Taisha. This kami was relocated from the summit of the mountain to its present location in the seventh year of the reign of the semi-legendary Emperor Sujin, or 90 BC per the traditional calendar. In 668 AD, Emperor Tenji decided to relocate the capital to Ōmi Province and built the Ōtsu Palace. At this time, the kami of Ōmiwa Shrine in Yamato Province (who served as protector of the imperial dynasty) was relocated as well, and was installed in the Nishi Hongū, whereas the original sanctuary came to be called the Higashi Hongū. In 788 AD, Saichō erected the Tendai Buddhist temple complex of Enryaku-ji on Mount Hiei. After the transfer of the capital to Heian-kyō, Enryaku-ji and by extension, Hiyoshi Taisha came to be guardians of the spiritually vulnerable northeast quadrant from the capital. As Enryaku-ji became ever more powerful, and the Buddhist faith gradually amalgamated with Shinto under the Shinbutsu-shūgō policy, Hiyoshi Taisha was subsumed into Enryaku-ji. As missionaries from Enryaku-ji built Buddhist temples all across Japan, they also spread the faith in the "Sanno Gongen" and the Hie kami.

The shrine became the object of Imperial patronage during the early Heian period. In 965, Emperor Murakami ordered that Imperial messengers were sent to report important events to the guardian kami of Japan, and Hie Taisha was added to this listing by Emperor Go-Suzaku in 1039. This unique number of Imperial-designated shrines has not been altered since that time.

During the late Heian period, political troubles arose between Enryaku-ji and the secular government in Kyoto. It became the practice of the warrior-monks from the temple to carry a mikoshi portable shrine from Hie Taisha into the capital and to riot to enforce their political will. Soon after the kanpaku Fujiwara no Moromichi dared to oppose the riots by stopping the mikoshi, he died under mysterious circumstances, which the temple was quick to attribute to a curse from the gods for having shown disrespect to the mikoshi. The mikoshi of Hei Taisha thus became an object of fear and awe, and the temple used the tactic of running riot with the mikoshi to obtain their will on more than 40 occasions over a 370+ year period into the Sengoku period.

The practice was stopped in 1571 when Oda Nobunaga ordered Enryaku-ji to be razed to the ground, and all of its monks to be massacred. This also included Hie Taisha. The shrine was rebuilt under Toyotomi Hideyoshi, with the oldest buildings currently at the shrine dating from the period of 1586 to 1597. Toyotomi Hideyoshi had a deep faith in the Sanno Gongen, as his childhood name was "Hiyoshi Maru" and his nickname was "monkey", an animal which was considered to be the spiritual messenger of the Hie kami. The Nishi Hongū was reconstructed in 1586 and the Higashi Hongū in 1595. Tokugawa Ieyasu also had faith in the Sanno Gongen and the shrine was supported by the Tokugawa shogunate.

In 1868 (the first year after the Meiji restoration), the new Meiji government decreed the separation of Shinto and Buddhism. Hie Taisha was at the forefront of this effort, and was one of the first to burn or otherwise dispose of its Buddhist statuary, ritual implements and scriptures. This was the beginning of the nationwide Haibutsu kishaku movement. Under State Shinto, the shrive was officially designated one of the Kanpei-taisha (官幣大社), or Imperial shrine of the first rank.

== Gallery ==
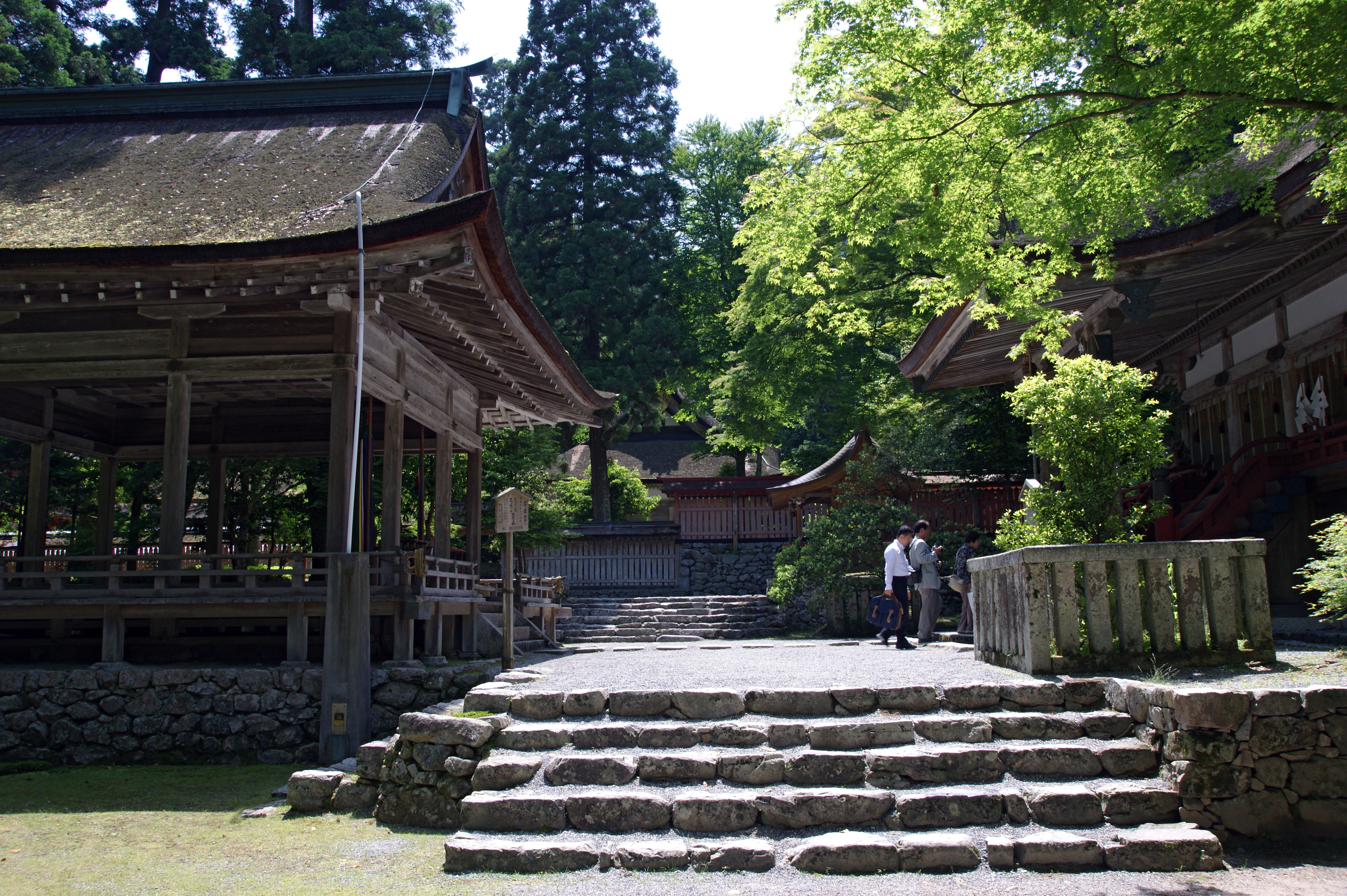
Usa-gū (ICP)

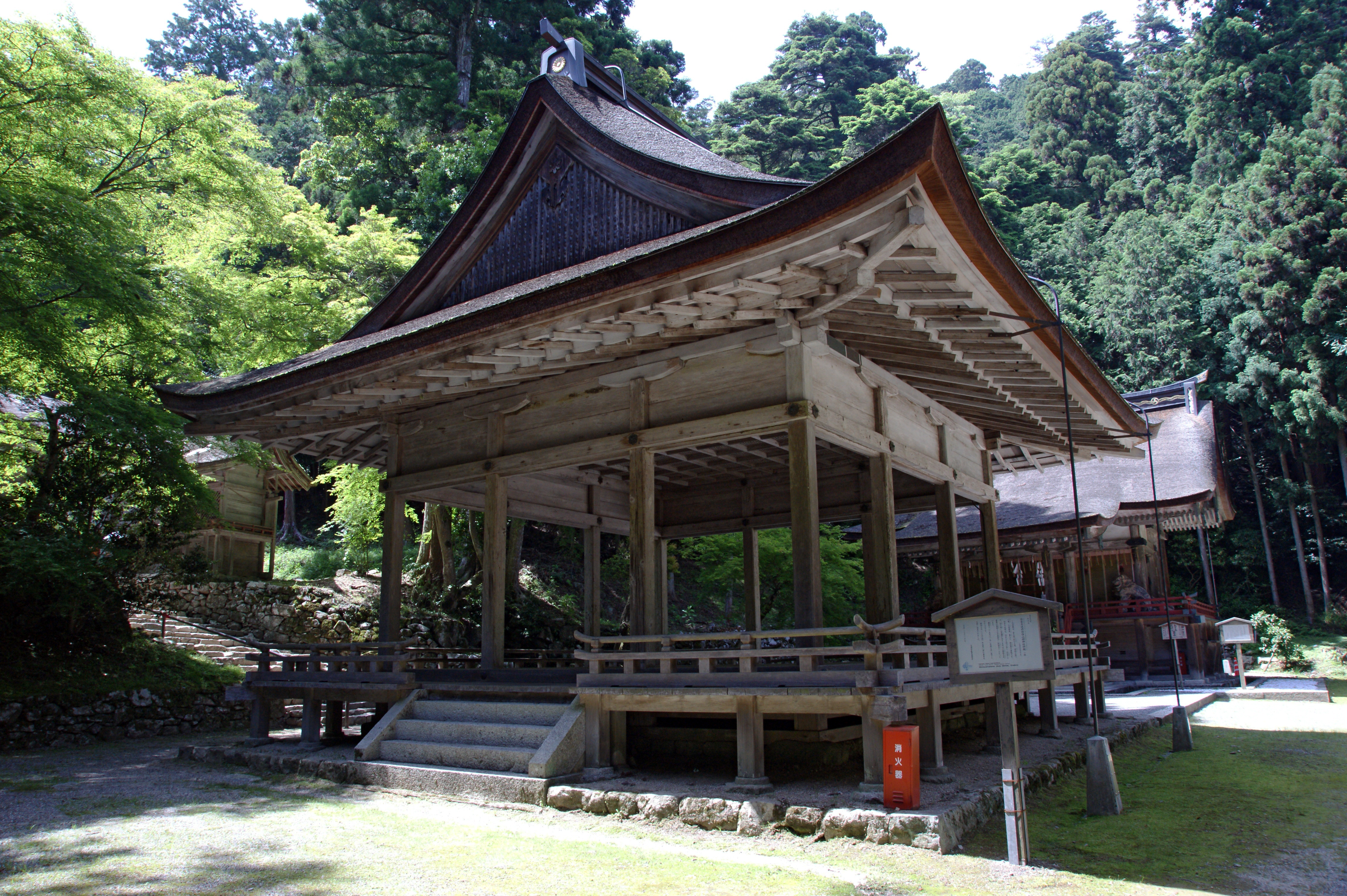
Shirayama-gū (ICP)

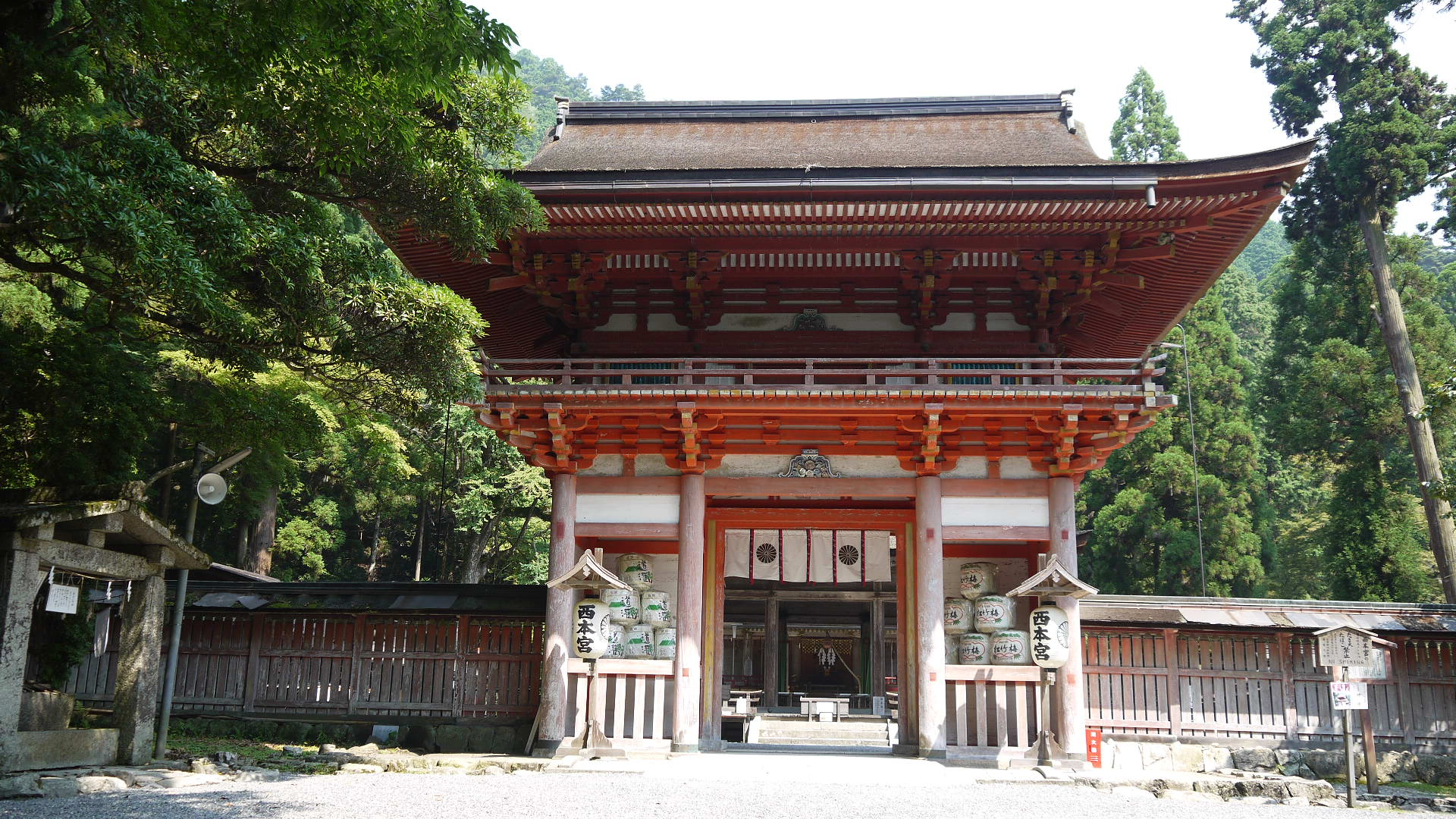
Higashi Hongū Romon (ICP)

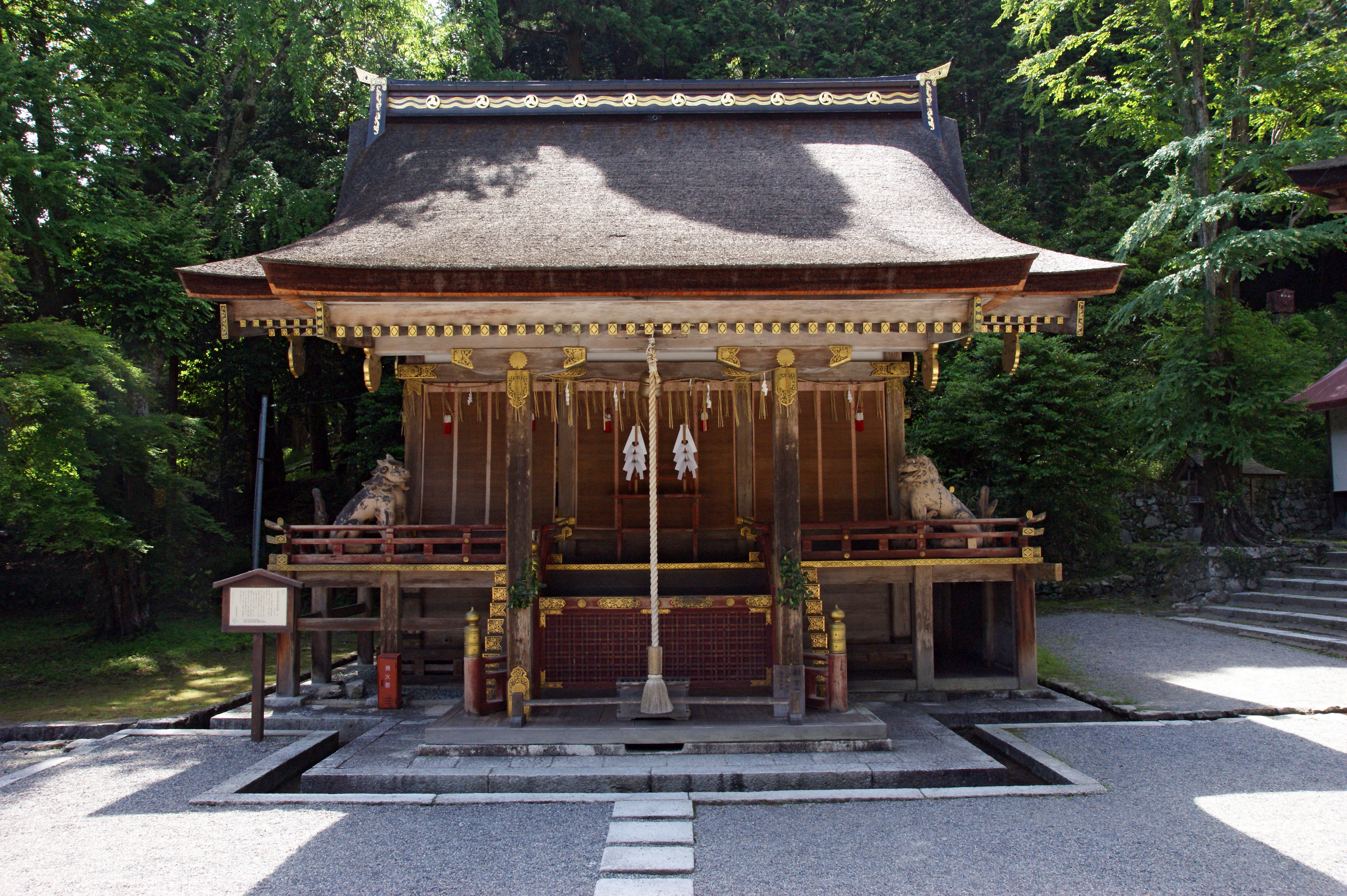
Juge Jinja (ICP)

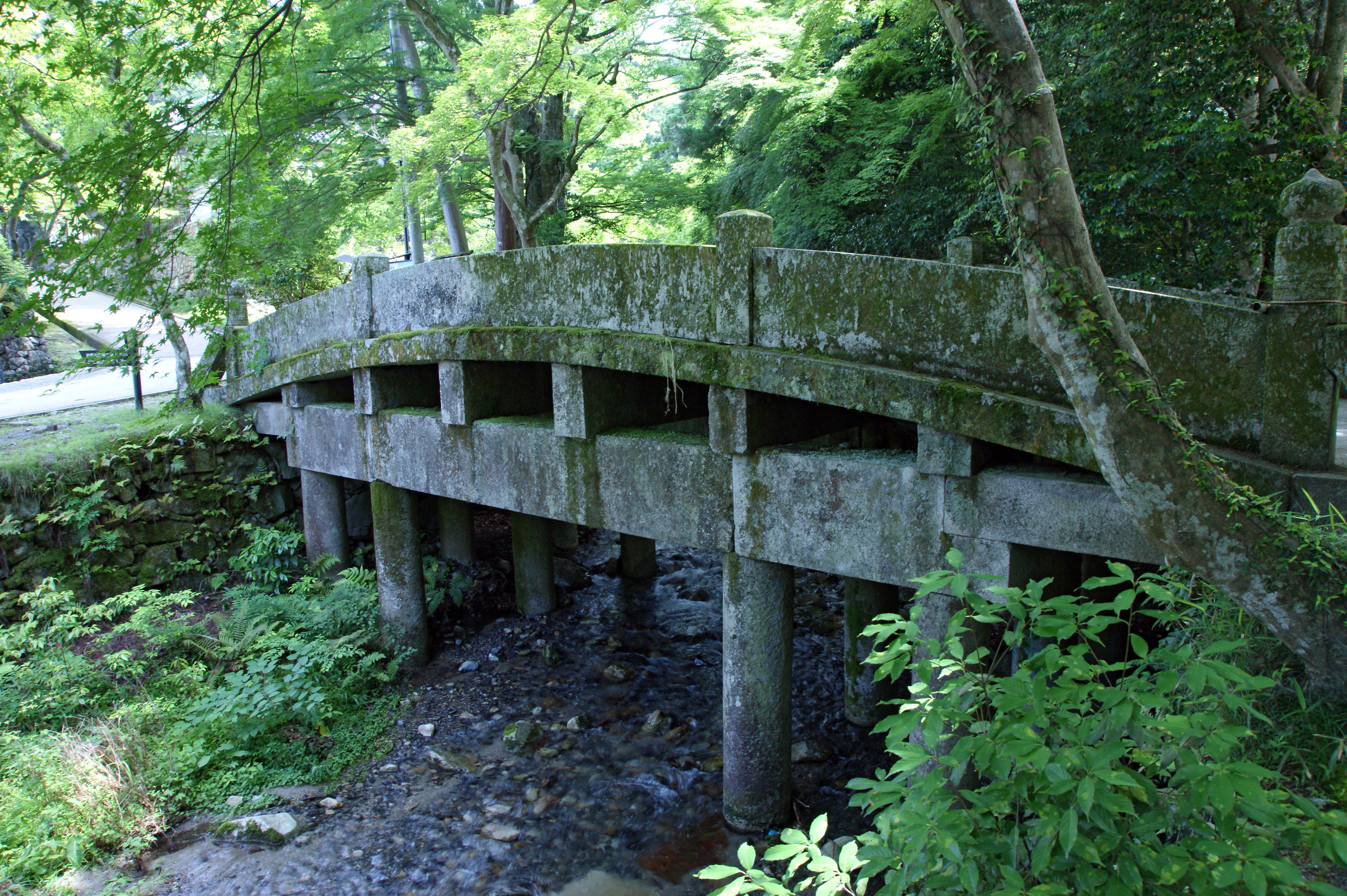
Ninomiya Bridge (ICP)

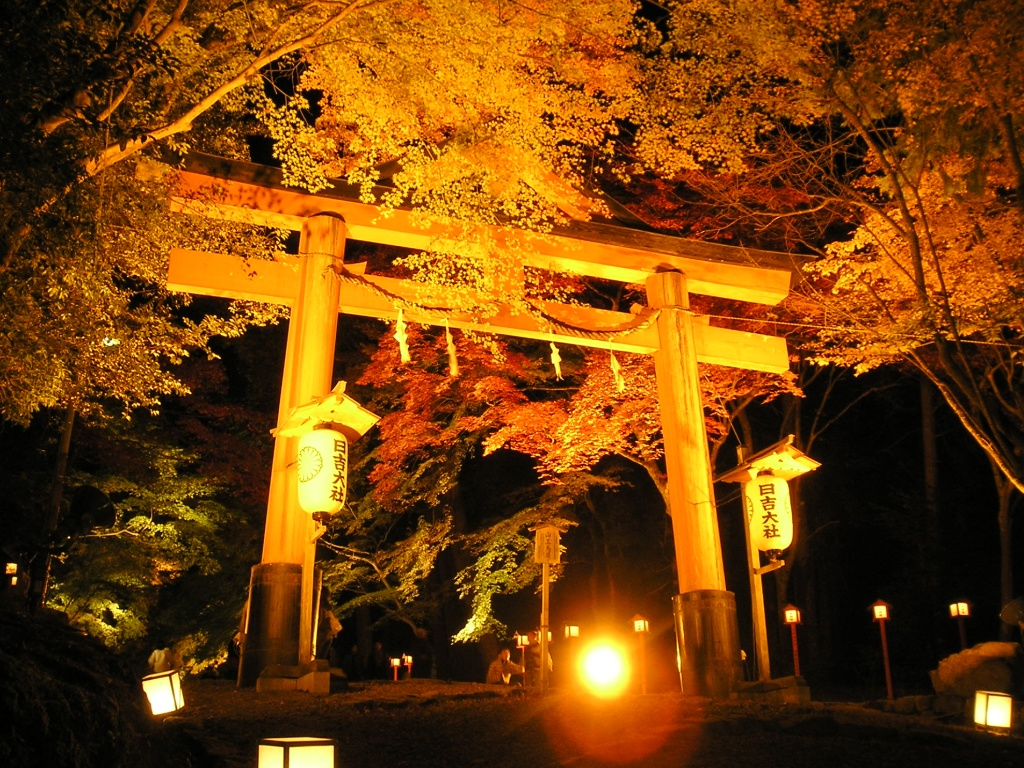
Torii on the Momiji Matsuri evening (Maple Festival)

== See also ==
- Twenty-Two Shrines
- List of National Treasures of Japan (shrines)
- List of Historic Sites of Japan (Shiga)
