= Shinshi =

Animal messengers in Shinto

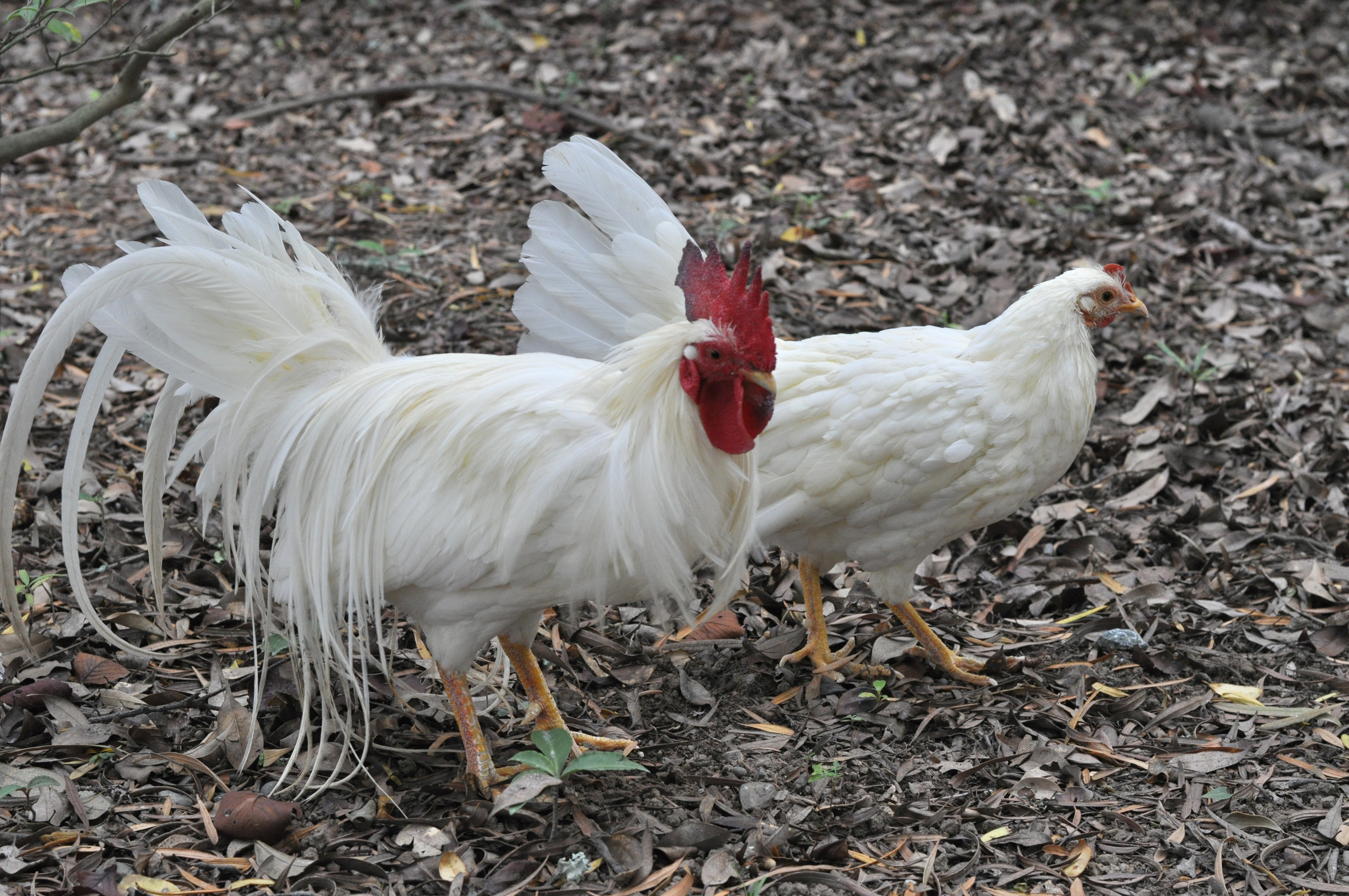
Chickens at Ise Grand Shrine. Parishioners believe they are messengers of Amaterasu.

Shinshi (神使; lit. 'spirit envoy') are animals in Japanese mythology that are believed to be associated with a kami, a divine being. These animals are also known as kami no tsukai or tsukawashime. In ancient texts such as Kojiki and Nihongi, there are tales of special animals that acted on behalf of the kami to transmit the divine will or to bear oracles.

Over time animals were connected to certain shrines. It became a custom to take care of these animals when they were found within the area of the shrine. Normally, each kami had only one animal familiar, but sometimes, there were some exceptions where a kami had more than one. Even some of the "Seven Lucky Gods" like Daikokuten (a mouse) and Benzaiten (a snake) had animal familiars.

Later the kami's animal familiar became a common symbol of the kami itself. For example, the foxes at Inari shrines was worshipped as a manifestation of Inari Ōkami. These creatures were thought to be extraordinary spiritual beings, and this perception, combined with their relationship with the specific kami, likely gave rise to this phenomenon.

It probably originated in shamanic practices, where animals aided shamans in traveling to the spirit world. Different deities have different associated animals, such as foxes for Inari Okami and deer with Kasuga.

Many tribal communities viewed their shaman's familiar as an ancestor, and this may have influenced the connection between animals and spirits in Shinto. For example, the Kamo clan believed that Yatagarasu was their ancestor Kamotaketsunumi no Mikoto.

At Ise Jingu, roosters roam around and are believed to be the assistants of the sun goddess, Amaterasu. They wake her up every morning, according to folklore. Some experts believe that the rooster may be the bird depicted on the torii, a gate that marks the entrance to a shrine. They are believed to call up the dawn with their sounds.

Inari Okami's fox messengers are considered to be her, although both Shinto and Buddhist priests discourage it. Rice food sake and other offerings are given to them for her.

== History ==
In a book called Fusō Sakki, which was written in the middle of the Heian period in Japan, it is mentioned that a person who killed a white fox (known as shiratoume) near the Ise Shrine was exiled to that area. This suggests that there was a belief in spiritual foxes in ancient Japan.

The "Chujin Harai-kun," a book written in the 12th century, states that the kami's messenger is second only to the eight great kami and is subordinate to the 100,000 kami. Moreover, "Kitakami Yuki-fu," an essay written in the early 19th century, explains that a ritual called hanasui-iwai is held every year on January 15. During this ritual, every new household is given a Shinshi.

Due to Shinbutsu shugo some buddhist deities have Shinshi such as Marici whose messenger is the boar.

In the modern day they are considered a notable concept for environmentalism.

== Examples ==
Animal	Kami
Cow	Tenjin
Fox	Inari Ōkami
Pigeon	Hachiman
Sea Snake	Izumo-taisha
Chicken	Amaterasu
Deer	Kasuga-taisha
Boar	Marici
Wolf	Mitsumine Shrine
Monkey	Hie Shrine, Juzenji

== Gallery ==
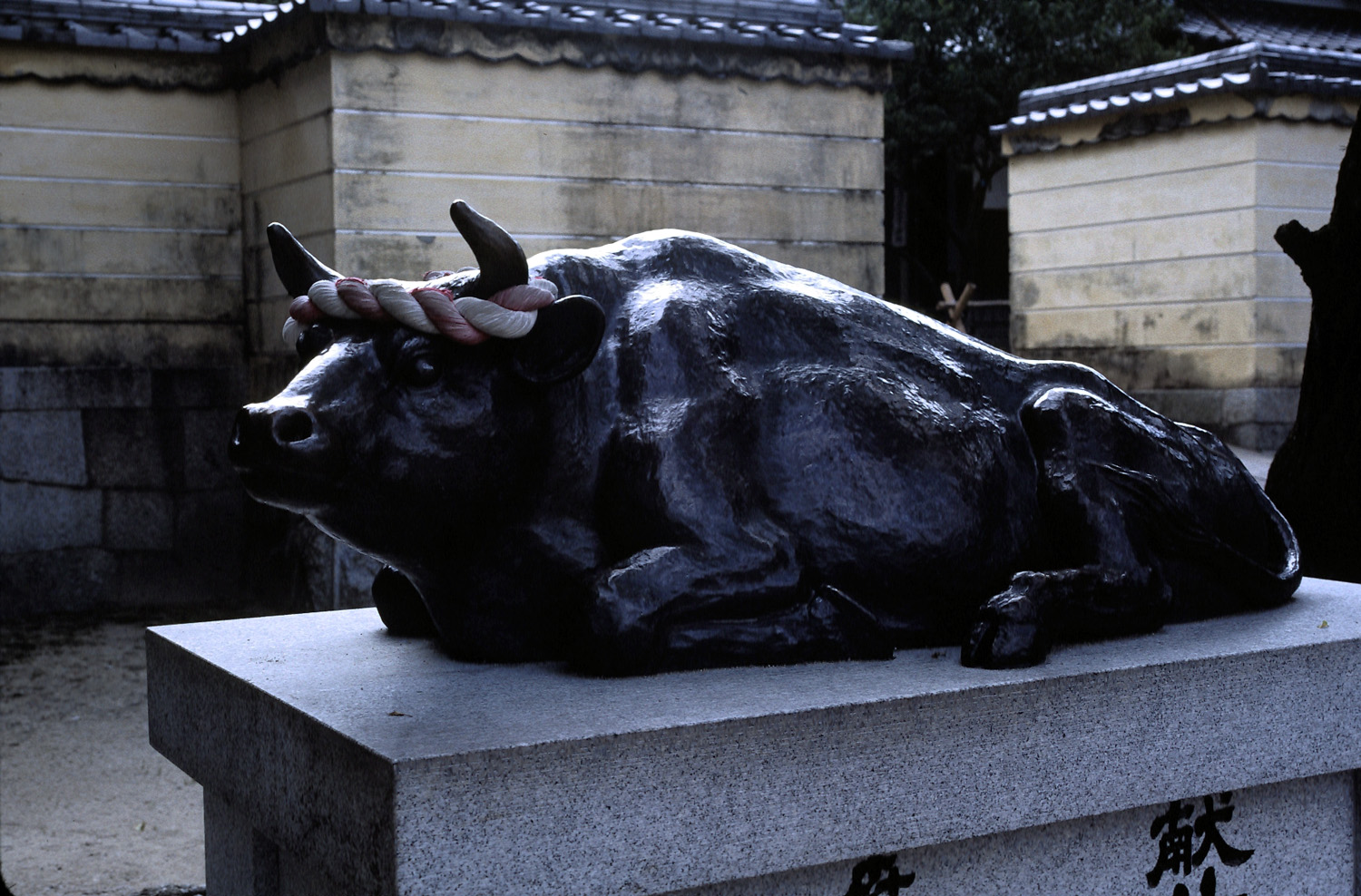
Reclining Cow Statue (Dazaifu City, Dazaifu Tenmangu Shrine)

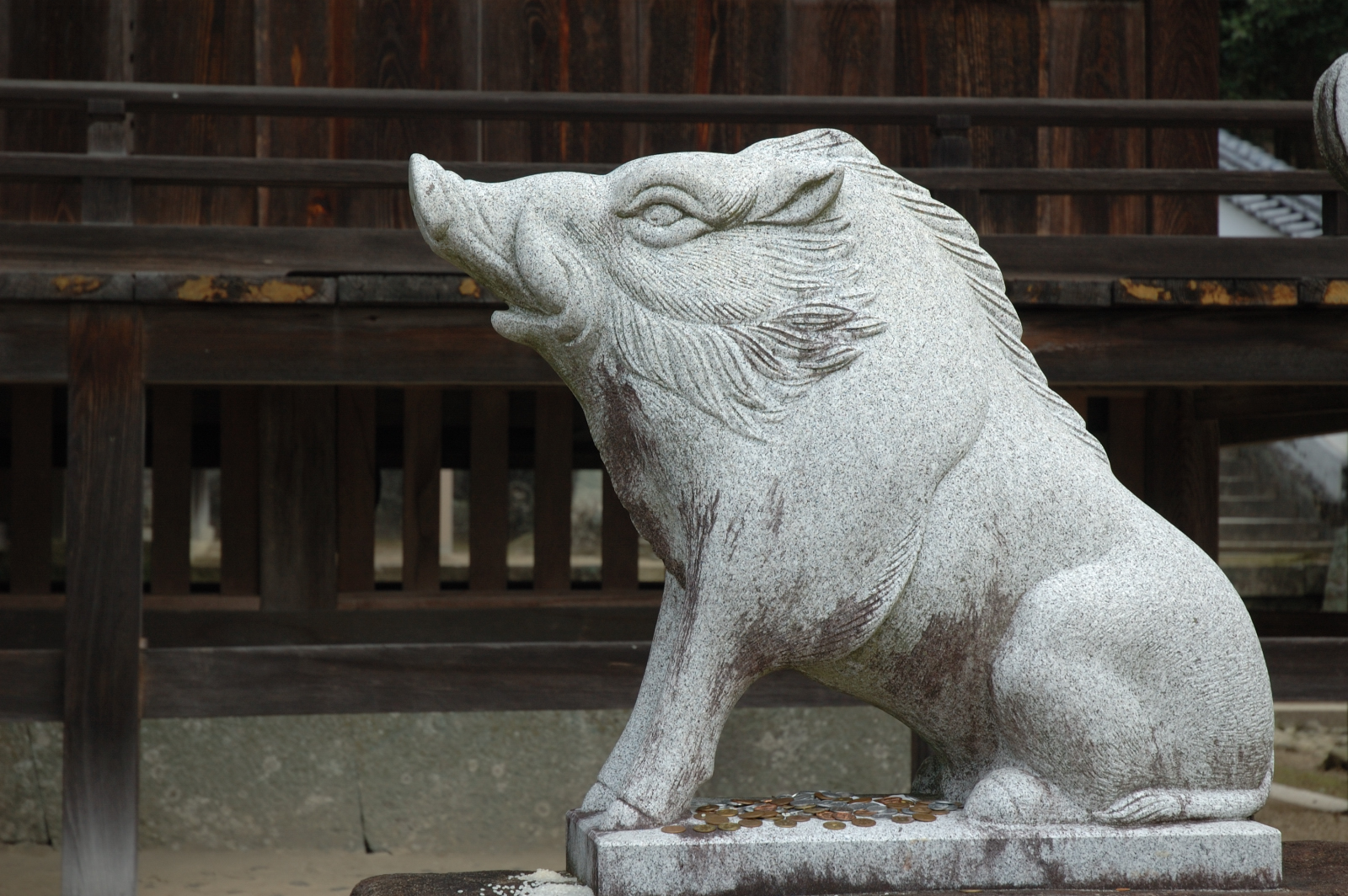
Guardians (Wake Shrine, Wake Town)

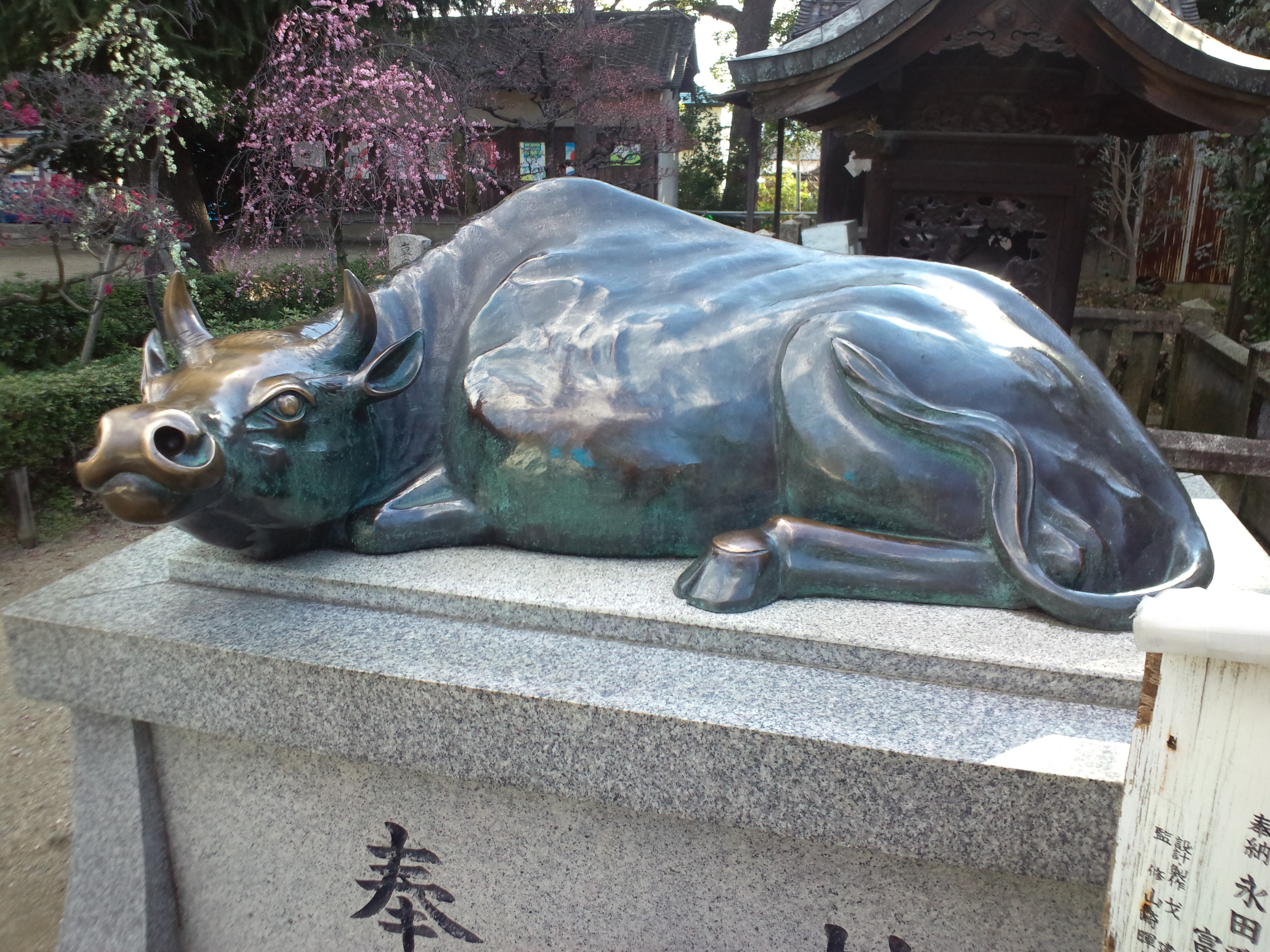
Reclining Cow Statue (Domyoji Tenmangu Shrine, Fujiidera City, Osaka Prefecture)

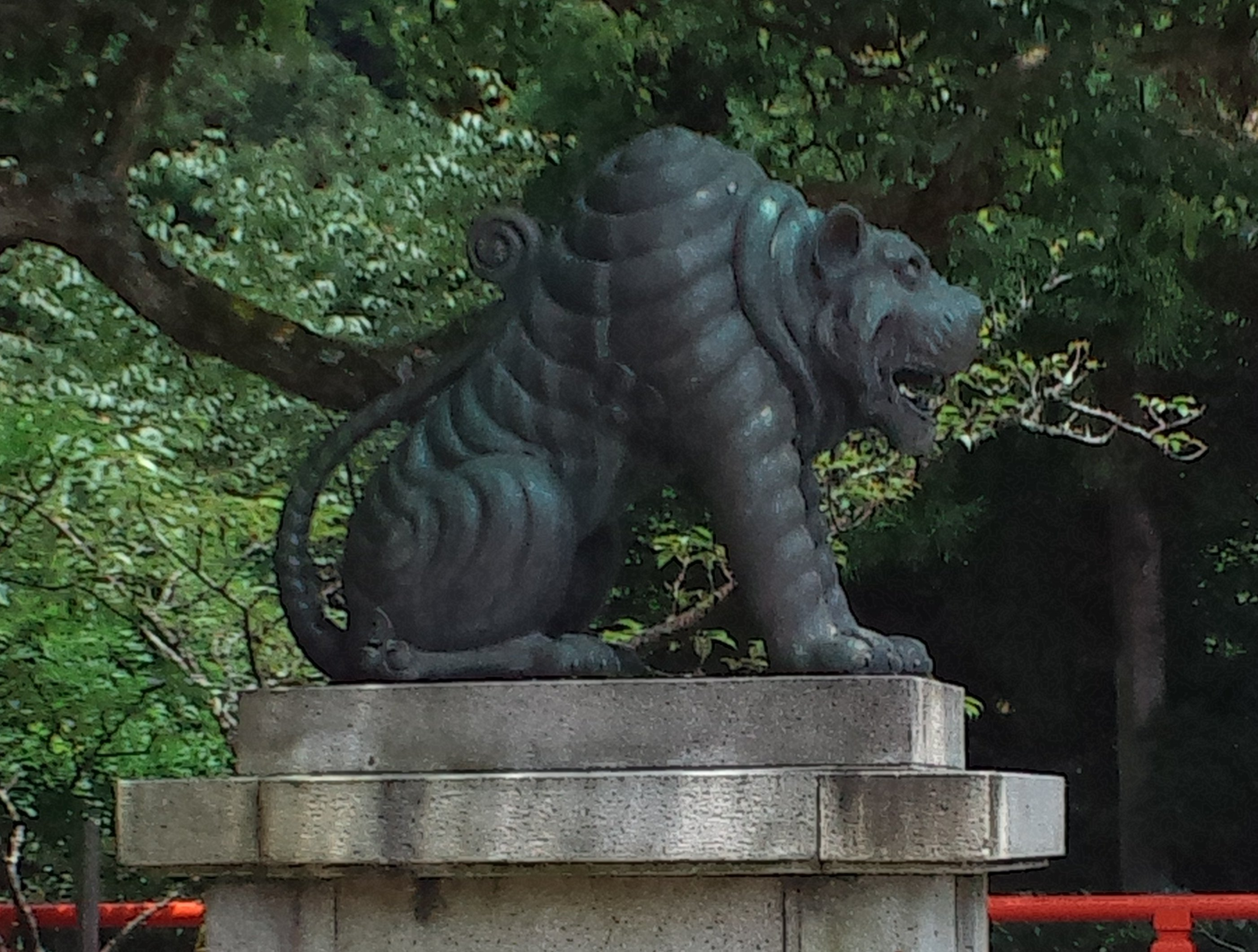
A-Un Tiger (Kuramadera, Kyoto City)

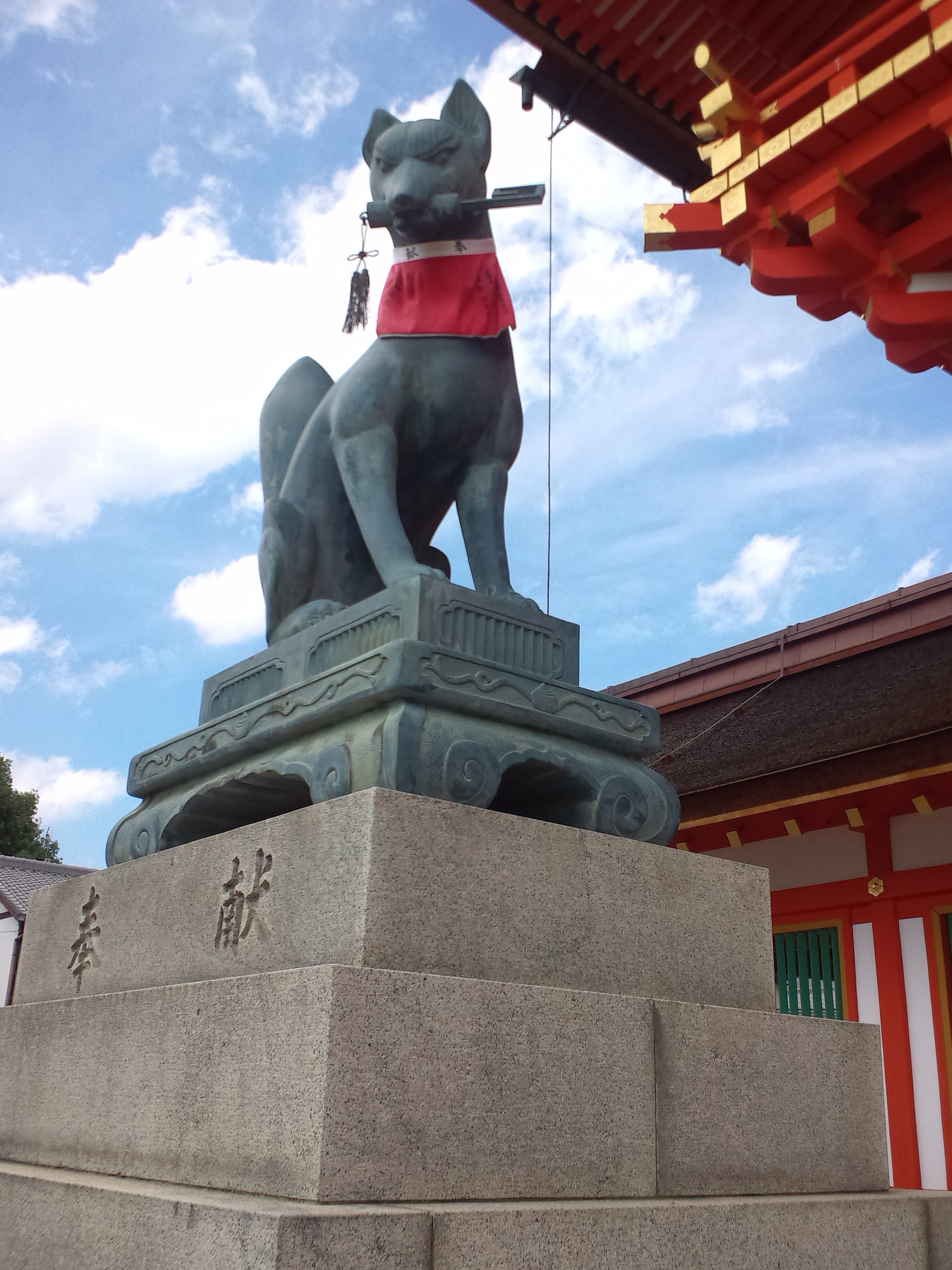
Statue of Inari (Fushimi Inari Taisha, Kyoto City)

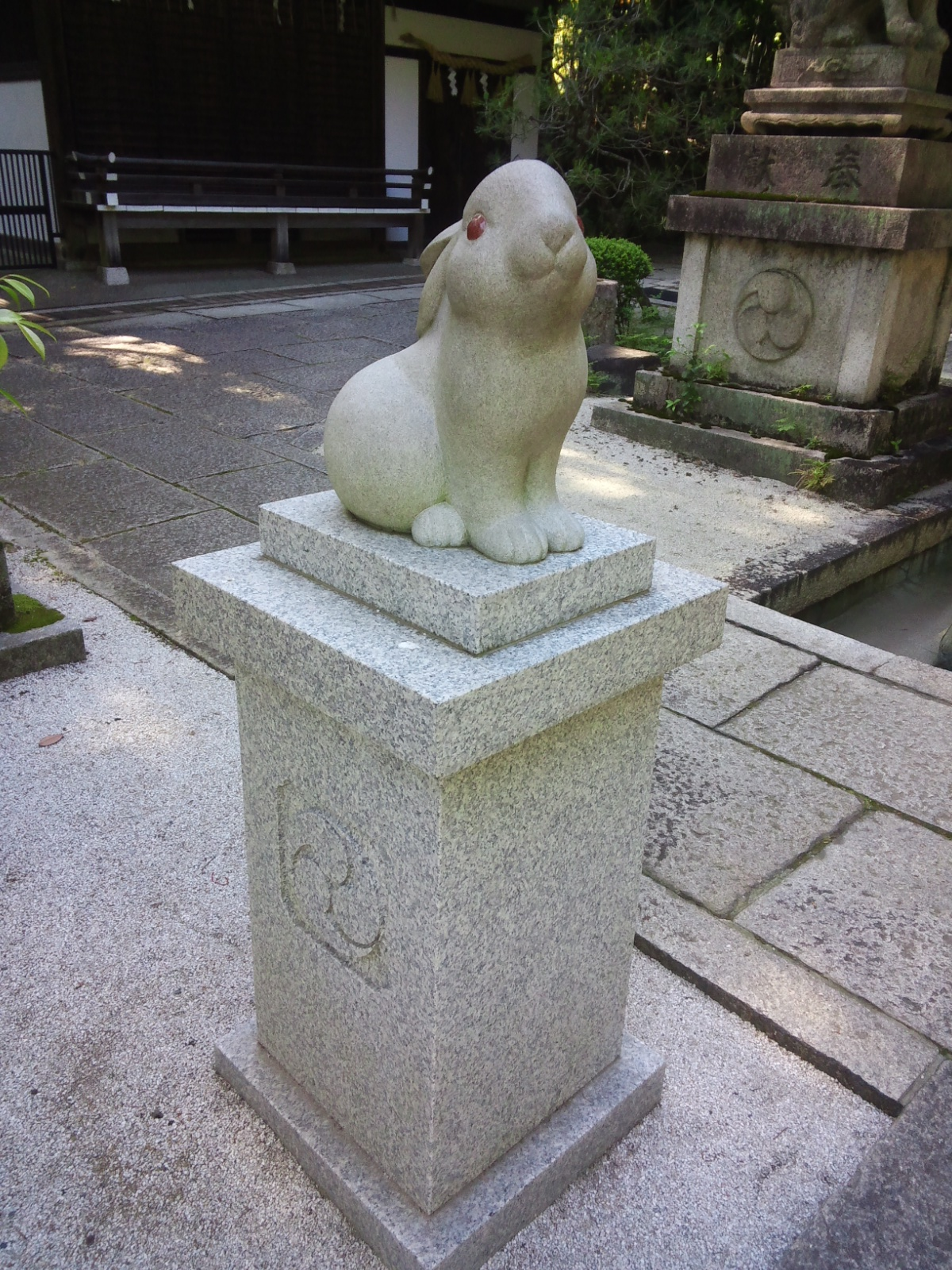
Koma rabbit (Okazaki Shrine, Kyoto City)

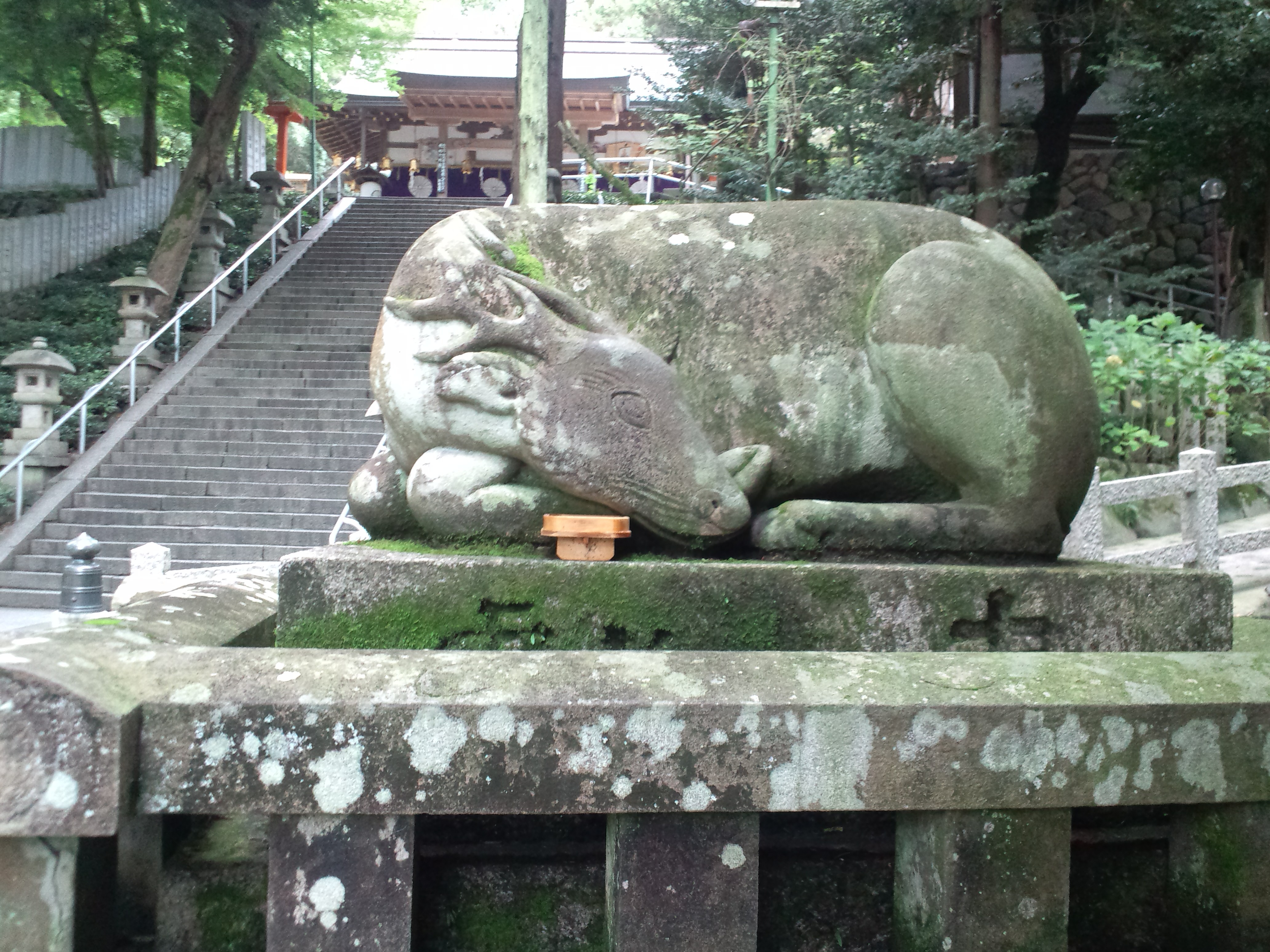
Statue of a deer (Higashiosaka City, Hiraoka Shrine)

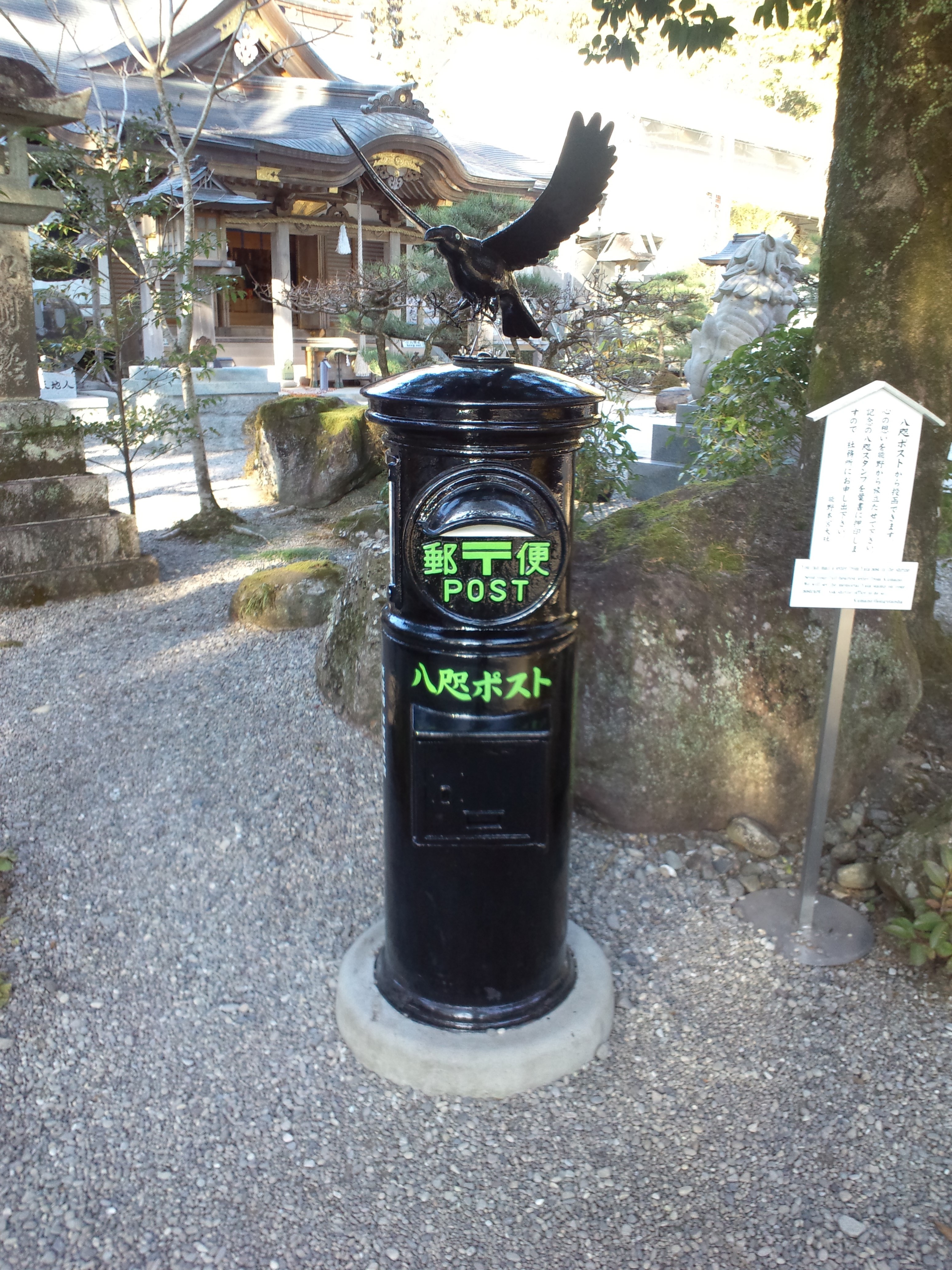
Yatagarasu Post (Kumano Hongu Taisha Shrine, Tanabe City)

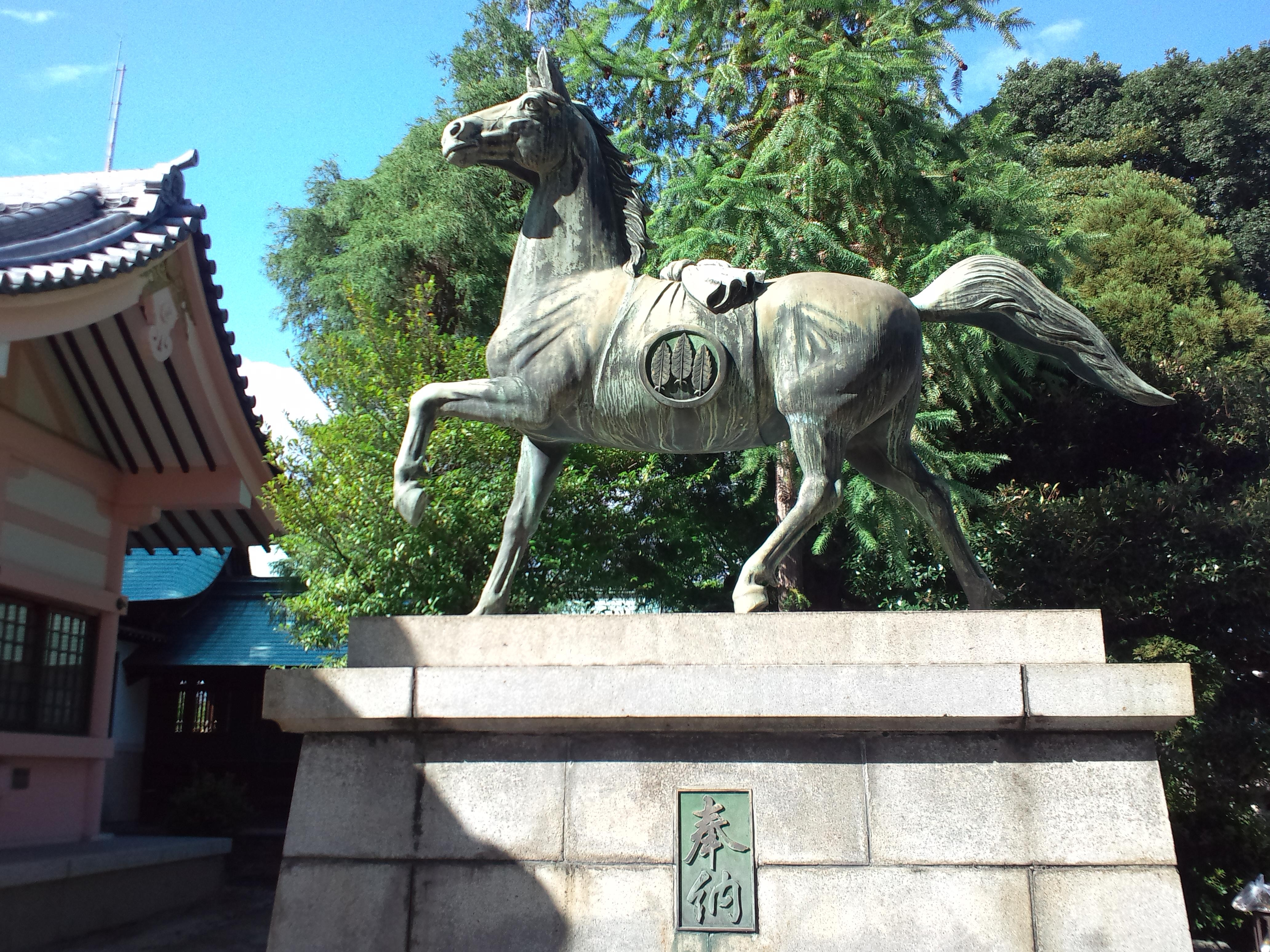
Statue of a sacred horse (Ookami Shrine, Ichinomiya City)

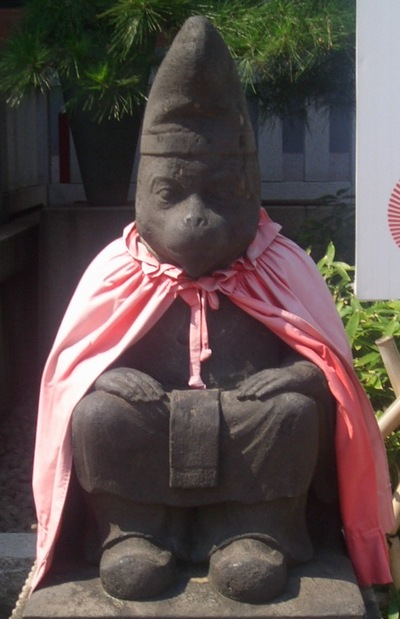
Statue of Monkey God (Hie Shrine, Tokyo)

== See also ==
- Komainu
- Gingitsune
