= Genshin =

Japanese Buddhist monk (942–1017)

- 源信
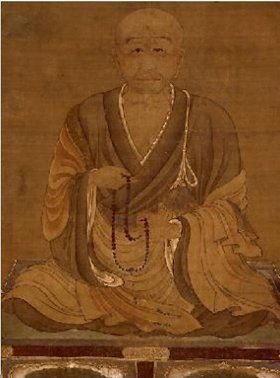
- Painting of Genshin at Shoju-raigo-ji Temple

Personal details
- Born: 942 Taima, Yamato Province, Japan
- Died: July 6, 1017 (aged 74–75)

Genshin (源信; 942 – July 6, 1017) was a prominent Japanese monk of the Tendai school, recognized for his significant contributions to both Tendai thought and Pure Land Buddhism. Genshin studied under Ryōgen, a key Tendai reformer, and became well known for his intellectual prowess, particularly after his success in official debates. He was also known as Eshin Sōzu (恵心僧都; Japanese pronunciation: [e.ɕiɰ̃ soꜜː.(d)zɯ]) and Yokawa Sōzu.

Genshin spent much of his later life at the secluded Eshin-in hermitage in Yokawa, Mount Hiei, where he focused on scholarly pursuits, writing, and meditation. He left behind numerous works on a variety of topics, including Buddhist reasoning, Abhidharma, Tendai doctrine, and Yogacara. Genshin's Ichijō yōketsu (Determining the Essentials of the One Vehicle) was one of his most important works, as it contributed to medieval Japanese debates about buddha-nature and the one vehicle. He has also been credited with founding the Eshin-ryū, which became a key lineage in the development of the inherent awakening (hongaku) teaching.

Genshin also became a leading figure in the development of Japanese Pure Land through his influential Ōjōyōshū (往生要集, Collection of the Essentials for Birth) and the founding of a nenbutsu society on Mount Hiei. The Ōjōyōshū outlined a comprehensive approach to attaining rebirth in Amitabha's Pure Land, integrating practices like precepts, buddha contemplation, and the recitation of the nembutsu.

Genshin's Ōjōyōshū is considered as "the formative text of Japanese Pure Land Buddhism" by buddhologist Robert F. Rhodes, who notes that the text remained the standard work on Pure Land in Japan for generations. Genshin had a profound impact on Heian period deathbed nembutsu rituals, which were widely adopted by the elites. Genshin's Ōjōyōshū was also instrumental in shaping later Japanese Pure Land figures such as Ryōnin, Hōnen, Shinran and Benchō. Genshin was therefore considered a patriarch in Japanese Pure Land Buddhism. Genshin's work is still read outside of the Tendai school by Pure Land scholars, and thus, he continues to resonate within modern Tendai and in Japanese Pure Land Buddhism today.

== Biography ==
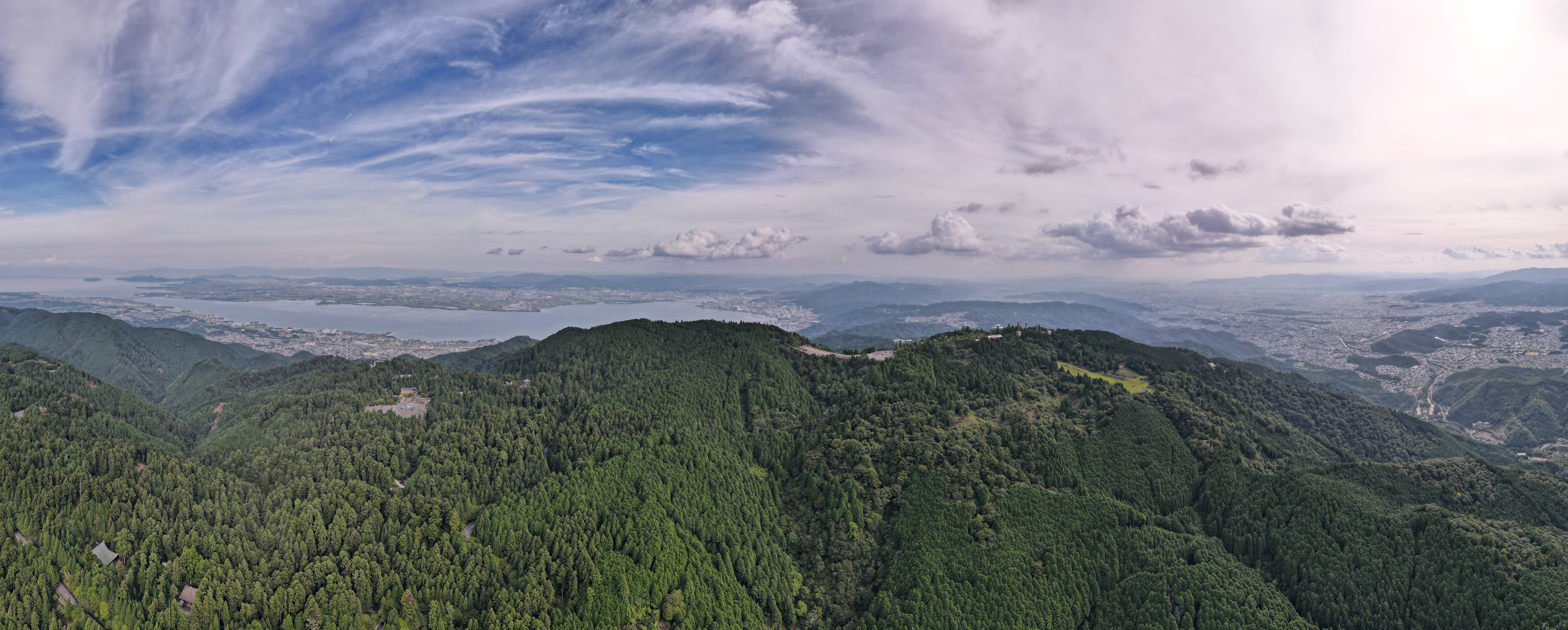
Panorama of Mount Hiei from the north

=== Early life and education ===
Genshin's life is somewhat obscure despite the existence of four different brief biographies on him from the Heian Period. What is known is that Genshin was born as Chigikumaro in Lower Katsuragi county, Yamato Province, to one Uraba no Masachika and his wife from the Kiyohara clan, a cadet of the Minamoto who were provincial aristocrats. His pious mother, a Pure Land believer, is said to have wished for a son, and prayed before a statue of the bodhisattva Kannon. After receiving a vision where a monk handed her a jewel, she is said to have become pregnant and gave birth to Genshin.

Genshin took tonsure with the Tendai sect of Buddhism as a child at Mount Hiei's Enryakuji Temple, though the reasons are unknown. One theory is that his father died, since his mother and sisters also took tonsure at some point. While there, he studied under the controversial monk Ryōgen 良源 (912–985), who would later become the head of Enryakuji. During this time, Tendai had become divided into two competing lineage factions (Jinmon and Sanmon, those of Enchin and Ennin respectively). Ryōgen was part of the Sanmon sect and worked to strengthen the power of this faction through the forging of ties with powerful politicians at the imperial court. Through his ties with court elites, Ryōgen was able solidify his power base in Yokawa, an old base of the Ennin sect that had previously gone into decline.

Genshin was trained in the Tendai tradition of exoteric and esoteric Buddhism, receiving full ordination in 955. Under Ryōgen, Genshin soon became a precocious scholar. At age fifteen in 956, Genshin was already giving sutra lectures and he was selected by Emperor Murakami as a lecturer for the prestigious Hokke Hakkō ceremony. Later, Genshin took part in debates promoted by Ryōgen to enforce academic standards. In 974, Genshin's victory against the Sanron monk Chōnen in a debate at the Imperial palace impressed the nobleman Taira no Chikanobu, who praised Genshin in his personal diary. In 978 Genshin wrote his first academic treatise, which was on Buddhist logic, the Inmyōronsho Shisōi Ryakuchūshaku (Abridged Commentary on the Four Divergences in the Treatise on Logic).

=== Yokawa ===
Sanmon-Santō Sakamoto Sōezu showing the Yokawa area of Enryakuji on Mount Hiei

By 981, Genshin had retired to the remote Yokawa area of Mount Hiei, away from the centers of religious and political power. In doing so, he "cast aside the prospect of a successful career within the Tendai monastic institution and retired to spend the rest of his life as a recluse in Yokawa." Scholars still speculate on his reasons for retreating from public and political life. Some sources say that Genshin's retreat was prompted by his own mother, who scolded him for associating with the powerful and the wealthy instead of practicing the Dharma. Rhodes also argues that the political machinations of Ryōgen, in particular his swift promotion of the monk Jinzen, a member of the Fujiwara clan, may have also led Genshin to retreat.

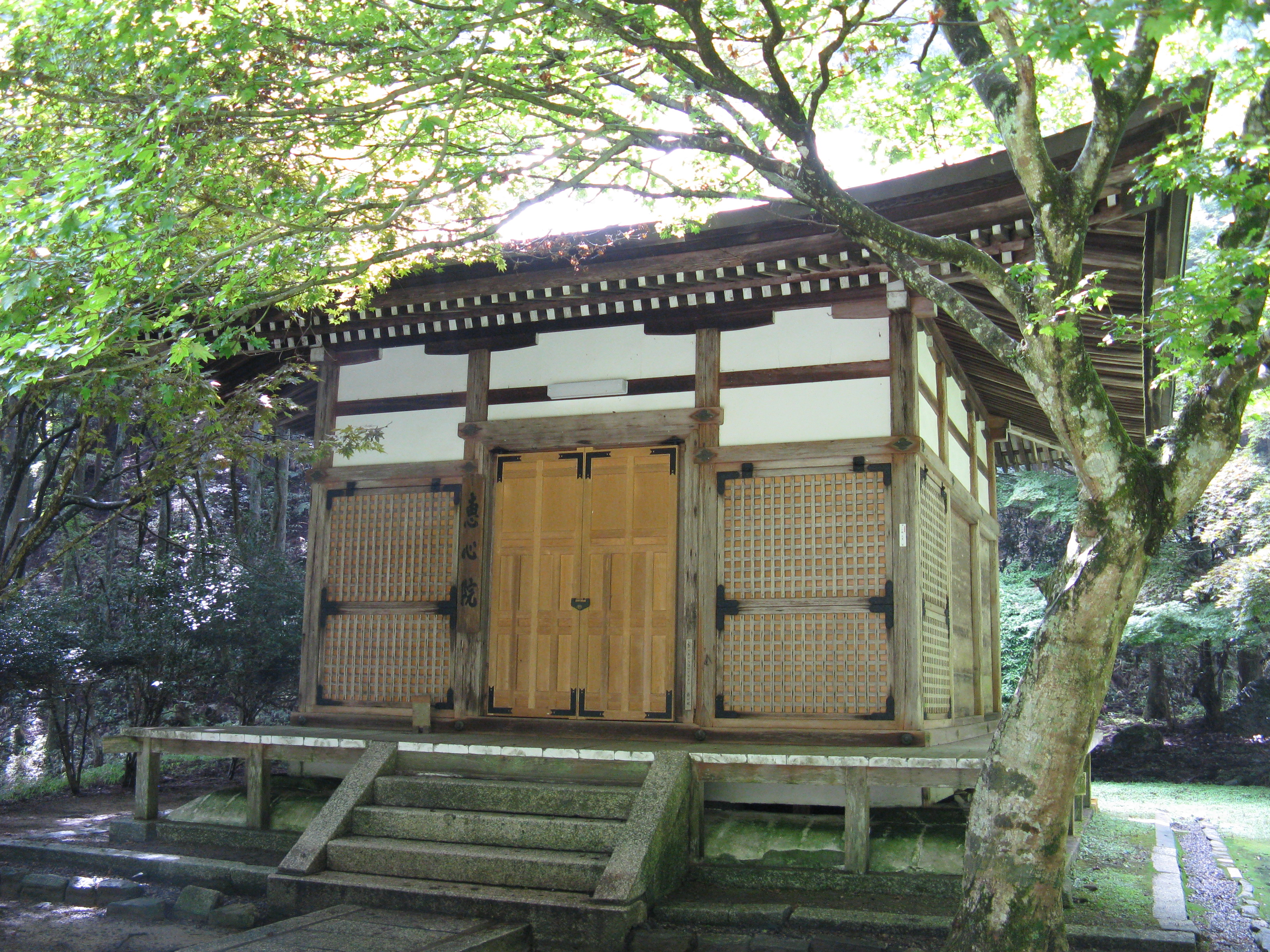
Eshin-do, Genshin's hermitage

The political infighting between the Sanmon and Jinmon lineages may also have been a factor. According to Rhodes, "Ryōgen’s partisan policies had polarized the monks of Mt. Hiei, and the resulting antagonism had poisoned the atmosphere of the entire monastery. Genshin must have felt that the situation had deteriorated to the point where Enryakuji was no longer fit as a serious center of religious practice." This period even saw the appearance of armed monks (sōhei), as rival factions resorted to violence to settle their disputes. Other disciples of Ryōgen such as Zōga (増賀, 917-1003) similarly retired in disgust, with some leaving Mount Hiei entirely.

Once at Yokawa, Genshin began to study and write on Pure Land Buddhism, completing some small Pure Land works, including the Byakugō kanbō (白毫觀法, Contemplating the Urna), which teaches the contemplation of the white hair curl between Amida Buddha's eyebrows and how this curl emits a salvific light that illumines all beings.

Four years later Genshin worked on his three fascicle Ōjōyōshū (往生要集, Essentials of Rebirth in the Pure Land) between 984 and 985. This systematic anthology of sutras and commentaries vividly described the sufferings of the six realms and the bliss of the Pure Land, establishing vocal and contemplative nenbutsu as the essential practice for rebirth. The text famously states, "The essential act for rebirth is the practice of the Buddha's name." Ōjōyōshū became immensely influential in Japan and was later taken to Song China, where it was also highly praised.

In 987, Genshin also went on pilgrimage to Kyūshū where he came into contact with Chinese Buddhist monks (and merchant escorts) who were staying there, and they exchanged works with one another. A merchant named Yang Renzhao (楊仁昭) reported that a copy of Ōjōyōshū was deposited there at Guoqingsi Temple on Mount Tiantai some time before 990. Genshin sought to further expand contacts with the parent Tiantai community in China, but due to the An Lushan Rebellion and internal strife within the Chinese community from 1000 onward, these efforts did not achieve the expected results.

=== Nenbutsu fellowship ===
During the 980s, Genshin remained deeply involved in the study and practice of Pure Land Buddhism. In 986 Genshin joined fellow monks dwelling in Yokawa in a nenbutsu fellowship called the nijūgo zanmaie (二十五三昧会; "The Fellowship of the Twenty-five Samadhis"), an association of twenty five nenbutsu devotees who all signed a vow together to help each other practice nenbutsu and attain birth in the Pure Land. It is unclear if Genshin was a founding member or not, however, and there are different scholarly views on this issue. The fellowship's vow calls for all members to see each other as spiritual friends who will, if one of them falls ill, encourage and support them in nenbutsu practice at the time of death. According to the Kishō hachikajō, the group also agreed to meet on the fifteenth of every month to practice a ritual recitation of the Amida Sutra, followed by circumambulatory nenbutsu, and dedication of merit. The fellowship integrated esoteric elements, notably the ritual empowerment of sand through the Mantra of Light. The empowered sand, which was seen as being able to eradicate karmic obstructions to rebirth in the Pure Land, was set aside for later funerary use. Beyond ritual practice, the society functioned as a disciplined monastic community: membership was based on moral conduct and regular participation; care for sick members was institutionalized through the planned construction of an infirmary (Ōjōin); and collective responsibility was emphasized at the deathbed, where all members were required to assemble to support the dying monk’s nenbutsu. Burial practices were likewise communal, involving a shared cemetery, periodic memorial services, and continued nenbutsu on behalf of deceased members, all restricted to an exclusively monastic fellowship.

In 988, Genshin revised the fellowship's covenant in the Yokawa Shuryōgon’in nijūgo zanmai kishō 横川首楞嚴院二十五三昧起請 (Covenant of the [Fellowship of] Twenty-five Samādhis of Shuryōgon’in of Yokawa). This text expands on the group's activities, specifying in detail the timing and sequence of the monthly all-night nenbutsu vigil, adding lectures on the Lotus Sūtra, and clarifying duties such as lamp offerings and altar simplicity. The revision also reinforced mutual obligations among members, portraying the fellowship as a quasi-familial community bound by reciprocal care during illness, and coordinated funerary observances. Particular emphasis was placed on organized hospice care, reflecting both doctrinal concerns about maintaining correct mindfulness at death and practical anxieties about aging, poverty, and abandonment. Although the fellowship initially struggled to realize its institutional goals such as the construction of the Ōjōin and cemetery, these difficulties eventually prompted external patronage.

=== Later life ===
In 990, Genshin was given responsibility for the Shikikō 四季講 (Lectures of the Four Seasons) by the elderly Jinzen. These were a series of yearly lectures and debeates instituted by Ryōgen. According to Rhodes, "in spring, lectures were given on the Huayan Sutra; in summer, on the Mahāparinirvāṇa Sūtra; in autumn, on the Lotus Sutra; and in winter, on either the Mahāsaṃnipāta Sūtra or the Large Prajñāpāramita Sūtra."

Throughout the next decade of his life in the 990s, Genshin continued to life as a recluse on Yokawa, practicing with his nenbutsu fellowship and continuing his studies in relative obscurity. He shunned worldly contacts and avoided monastic offices. Genshin remained aloof from official activities until around 1001, when participated in a Ninnōe (Benevolent Kings Ceremony) at the imperial palace. At this year he was also given the priestly rank of Dharma Bridge (hōkyō shōnin). He also served as a judge for official debates held in the 1004 Minazukie ceremony. During this time he received the ecclesiastic rank of supernumerary minor bishop (gonshōsōzu 權少僧都). However, despite his fame at court, he resigned this official position after only one year in 1005, never accepting any further promotions again. Even when the powerful Fujiwara no Michinaga (966–1027) sought him out for private religious services, Genshin politely refused. His fame at this time is reflected in the Tale of Genji which mentions a reclusive "bishop of Yokawa", which is thought to refer to Genshin.

Genshin continued writing throughout his life, producing major works like the Daijō Tai Kusha Shō (Extracts Comparing the Mahāyāna with the [Abhidharma-] kośa), a comparative study of Mahayana and Abhidharma philosophy, and the Ichijō Yōketsu (1006), which expounded the one-vehicle doctrine of universal Buddhahood. Genshin composed a number of other treatises (over 30 works) throughout his life. In 994 he wrote the Sonshō yōmon 尊勝要文 (Essential Passages on Butchō Sonshō), a work on the important Sonshō dhāraṇī (Sarvadurgati-pariśodhana Uṣṇīṣavijayā dhāraṇī). This dhāraṇī which is associated with the destruction of bad karma and ensures birth in Amida's Pure Land was an important part of Pure Land practice in the Heian period. Genshin recited it three hundred thousand times throughout his life. Genshin also wrote the Bodaishingi yōmon 菩提心義要文(Essential Passages on the Meaning of the Aspiration for Enlightenment) in 997, in which he discusses the need to arouse bodhicitta.

Genshin also helped establish several new organizations at Yokawa, including the Mukakekō (Association to Worship the Coming of Amida Buddha to Take Dying Believers to the Pure Land) and the Shakakō (Śākyamuni Association), which was based on devotion to the Śākyamuni of the Lotus Sutra and sought to create a ritual center which represented Śākyamuni Pure Land on Vulture Peak. Genshin also contributed to initiating the Mukaekō ceremonies which invoke Amida Buddha's welcoming descent at the time of death using song and dance. Genshin may have also been involved in the creation of raigō paintings depicting the coming of the Buddha Amida.

In 1013, Genshin wrote a work that listed all the practices he had done in his life until this time. The text states:

Here, I will briefly list the practices that I have cultivated while alive. Nenbutsu: twenty koṭi times. Mahāyāna sutras recited: 55,500 fascicles [Lotus Sutra, 8,000 fascicles; Amida Sutra, 10,000 fascicles; Prajñāpāramitā Sūtra, 3,000-odd fascicles, etc.]. Great spells (mantras) invoked: one million recitations [spell of the Thousand-Armed (Kannon), seven hundred thousand times; spell of Sonshō, three hundred thousand times]. In addition, spells of Amida, Fudō, Light, and Butsugen several times.

Furthermore, the Kakochō biography adds that there are other records of Genshin's practices that include "the creation of Buddhist statues, the copying of sutra scrolls, the practice of donation, and helping others do good."

Genshin's "eclectic" recitation of numerous different sutras and mantras was in line with the traditional Tendai approach. As Rhodes notes, "Although Genshin believed that the nenbutsu was the primary practice for birth in the Pure Land, he also stressed the importance of undertaking various other subsidiary practices to enhance the effectiveness of the nenbutsu. For Genshin, these auxiliary practices were beneficial in helping one toreach the Pure Land."

In 1014 Genshin finished writing the Amidakyō ryakki 阿彌陀經略記 (Abbreviated Notes on the Amida Sutra), a short commentary to the Amida Sūtra, which he saw as the best sutra for daily recitation. In this work, he emphasizes recitative nenbutsu (which is the main topic of the sutra) and also the importance of faith. An anecdote preserved in the Kakochō biography portrays the elderly Genshin articulating a clear and deliberate preference in his Pure Land practice. When questioned about the most important of his many religious disciplines, he identified the nenbutsu, and specifically clarified that his practice consisted solely in reciting the name of Amida Buddha rather than engaging in doctrinal contemplation of Amida’s dharma-body. He explained that name-recitation alone is adequate for securing rebirth in the Pure Land and that, although he was capable of contemplative practice, he did not consider it necessary for his own aims. This exchange shows that while Genshin had experience with and insight into contemplative nenbutsu, he had chosen to devote himself almost exclusively to vocal recitation in his old age, maintaining the conviction that it was fully sufficient to ensure birth in Amida’s land.

After several years of illness, Genshin died in 1017 at the age of 75. According to the Kakochō biography, at his final moment, he held a thread tied to the hand of a statue of Amida Buddha and with his hands joined prayer recited some verses. Then he washed and cleaned his room. He eventually died peacefully in his sleep while holding the string tied to the Buddha statue. The date of his passing is still marked by an annual ceremony at the Mount Hiei's Yokawa.

His main disciples included Kakuchō, Ryōzen, Myōgō, and other eminent monks. The scholarly tradition called Eshin-ryū derives from his lineage.

== Teachings ==
Genshin was trained in the Tendai Buddhist tradition (the Japanese branch of Tiantai Buddhism). As such, his writings reflect a Tendai worldview and a deep understanding of the classic Tiantai teachings on meditation (as found in Zhiyi's Mohe Zhiguan), and doctrine (such as the three truths). His works discuss numerous topics, such as the One Vehicle of the Lotus Sutra, Abhidharma and Mahayana and Pure Land.

Genshin also took a special interest in Chinese Pure Land teachings of masters such as Shandao. This places him in the Tendai Pure Land current which included the popular preacher Kūya, and the scholar-monks Ryōgen (912-985), Zenyu (913-990), and Senkan (918-983). The basic Pure Land belief is that we should seek to be reborn in the pure land of Amitabha Buddha, since it is the safest, most accessible and easiest path to Buddhahood. This is achieved through various practices, though the recollection of the Buddha (Chinese: nianfo, Japanese: nembutsu) was the main practice.

=== Pure land teachings ===
Genshin's Ōjōyōshū (往生要集; Collection of the Essentials for Birth [into the Pure Land of Amida Buddha]) is an extensive presentation of Pure Land Buddhist theory and practice. According to Rhodes, the work attempts to incorporate the Pure Land teaching into Tendai by showing how it is compatible with the traditional Tendai system of meditation. This text, which was the first such extensive summary of Pure Land thought and practice in Japan, "remained the standard work on these topics for generations".

Much of the Ōjōyōshū is composed of quotations on Pure Land topics from Mahayana sutras and treatises. According to Rhodes, "the number of passages quoted in the Ōjōyōshū is enormous: nearly a thousand from over one hundred and sixty different texts". The most important and widely cited sources in Genshin's Ōjōyōshū are the works of the Chinese Pure Land masters like Shandao and Huaigan.

The teaching of the Ōjōyōshū is based on the idea that Pure Land Buddhism is the "easy practice" most suitable for the age of dharma decline (J: mappō), an age that Genshin believed was imminent based on scripture and current events. Genshin held that in this latter age of decline, it was extremely difficult to attain liberation through the traditional Tendai path. As such, the only feasible method for liberation for most people was to gain birth in Amida Buddha's Pure Land through the nenbutsu, which for Genshin referred to a variety of practices. Genshin explains this rationale in his preface to the text, which states:

The teaching and practice for birth in the Land of Supreme Bliss are the eyes and legs (of people who seek buddhahood in) the defiled Latter Age. Who among clerics, lay believers, nobles, and commoners will not take refuge in it? Moreover, the texts of the exoteric and esoteric teachings are not few, and their practices, both for relative and ultimate realizations, are many. Those who are intelligent and diligent may not find them difficult, but how can someone as dull as I dare even attempt them? Thus I have collected a few essential passages from the sutras and treatises on the single way of the nenbutsu.

The Essentials for Birth begins with an extensive discussion on the six realms of samsara and the suffering of each, which includes graphic depictions of the various sufferings one finds in the hell realms. Genshin explains that liberation from suffering can never be found in these realms. Thus, the second chapter of the work explains the bliss experienced in the Pure Land, encouraging readers to seek birth there since it is a place where one can learn the Dharma from great bodhisattvas and Amida Buddha himself.

==== Benefits of the Pure Land ====
According to Genshin, practitioners who dedicate themselves to nenbutsu will experience a peaceful death, free from physical suffering, as Amida and celestial bodhisattvas appear to escort them. This divine welcome (raigo) brings immediate tranquility, and upon death, practitioners find themselves instantly transported to the Pure Land on lotus thrones.

In the second chapter of the Ōjōyōshū, Genshin describes the Pure Land through ten blisses or joys (jūraku 十樂) that inhabitants experience once born there:

1. The pleasure of being received by a host of sages (聖衆來迎樂, shōshū raigō raku) - Being escorted to the Pure Land by Amida Buddha and bodhisattvas at the moment of death
2. The pleasure when the lotus first opens (蓮華初開樂, renge shokai raku) - The joy experienced when seeing the Pure Land's splendor for the first time once one has been reborn in the lotus dais
3. The pleasure of the bodily marks and supernatural powers (身相神通樂, shinsō jintsū raku) - The pleasure experienced based on the beautiful golden body with the thirty-two marks and five superpowers
4. The pleasure of the five sublime sense-objects (五妙境界樂, gomyō kyōgai raku) - Experiencing perfect sights, sounds, smells, tastes, and sensations of the Pure Land that inspire spiritual growth
5. The pleasure of never retrogressing from bliss (快樂無退樂, keraku mutai raku) - The bliss of the freedom from falling back into suffering or evil paths
6. The pleasure of being able to establish karmic connections (引接結緣樂, inshō kechien raku) - The ability to help and teach parents, teachers, and others one has karmic ties with from past lives
7. The pleasure of being in the same assembly with sages (聖衆俱會樂, shōshū gué raku) - Encountering advanced bodhisattvas like Mañjuśrī, Maitreya, and Kannon and learning from them
8. The pleasure of beholding the buddha and hearing the Dharma (見佛聞法樂, kenbutsu monpō raku) - Direct access to Amida's teachings in various forms
9. The pleasure of being able to venerate the buddhas as one pleases (隨心供佛樂, juishin kubutsu raku) - Freedom to travel to other buddha-fields and pay respect to other buddhas
10. The pleasure of progressing along the Buddhist path (增進佛道樂, zōshin butsudō raku) - Having ideal conditions for practicing and achieving Buddhahood

According to Genshin, the Pure Land itself possesses extraordinary physical beauty, with jeweled pools, fragrant trees, and melodious birds that teach the Dharma. Residents receive transformed bodies with supernatural abilities, including clairvoyance and instantaneous travel. Genshin emphasizes that these sensory delights never create attachment or desire, rather they exclusively support spiritual development. Inhabitants never suffer or regress spiritually, and they gain the ability to help family members and others from their previous lives by guiding them toward enlightenment.

Most importantly, the Pure Land offers direct access to high level bodhisattvas and buddhas. Residents can study with renowned bodhisattvas like Mañjuśrī and Maitreya, encounter Amida Buddha himself in various manifestations, and even visit other buddhafields to receive teachings. This creates optimal conditions for spiritual progress that would be nearly impossible in our ordinary Saha world, where distractions and obstacles abound. Through these encounters and the supportive environment, all Pure Land inhabitants are guaranteed the attainment of full Buddhahood.

The third chapter affirms that Amida's land is the best of all pure lands through various arguments and scriptural citations.

==== Nenbutsu ====
For Genshin, the principal and most important method for attaining birth in the Pure Land is the nenbutsu. In chapter eight, he outlines the main reason why this is the case:

In recommending the nenbutsu, I do not intend to reject the various other sublime practices. However, this (nenbutsu practice) does not distinguish among males and females, nobles and commoners, or (whether it is done while one is) walking, standing, sitting, or lying down. It does not matter when, where, or under what condition (it is practiced). It is not difficult to practice, and so on. When one desires to seek birth (in the Pure Land) at the time of one’s death, there is nothing more expedient than the nenbutsu.

In chapter ten, Genshin even argues that nenbutsu is the best Buddhist practice, writing that "only the practice of the nenbutsu is (both) easy to undertake and results in the realization of a lofty level of attainment (i.e., buddhahood). It should be known that this is the supreme practice."

Genshin's interpretation of the nenbutsu, found in the next two chapters of the Essentials, draws on the schema of the five gates of mindfulness: veneration, praise, vow, contemplation, and merit transference. Genshin sees the gate of contemplation as central, and he describes the various ways of doing nenbutsu, from meditative visualization to the recitation of Namo Amida Butsu. According to Rhodes, "Reflecting the great emphasis traditionally placed on meditation in Tendai discourse, Genshin highlights the literal meaning of the word “nenbutsu”—to remain mindful of a buddha—and emphasizes that the nenbutsu is first and foremost a meditative practice in which the practitioners concentrate their minds on Amida. In other words, he understands the nenbutsu primarily as the practice of visualizing, while abiding in samādhi, the figure of Amida Buddha."

Nevertheless, since this meditative nenbutsu may be difficult for some, he also recommends simpler visualizations for these people, such as focusing on Amida's ūrṇākośa (byakugō, a tuft of white hair between a Buddha's eyebrows) and the light shining from it.

For those who cannot visualize even this simpler meditation, Genshin recommends the recitative nenbutsu of saying "Namu Amida Butsu", writing:

If you are incapable of contemplating the marks and secondary marks (of Amida), you should remain mindful (of the buddha) by single-mindedly reciting while imagining yourself taking refuge (in Amida), while imagining yourself being led to the Pure Land at death, or while imagining yourself at-taining birth in the Pure Land...Whether you are walking, standing, sitting, lying down, speaking, or remaining silent—no matter what you aredoing—always remain mindful (of Amida) in your heart, just as a starving person thinks of food or a thirsty person thinks of water. You may lower your head and raise your arms or raise your voice and recite (Amida’s name). Although your outward actions may differ, always keep the thought in mind. Keep it (in mind) continuously from one moment to the next, and never forget it, no matter whether you are awake or asleep.

Genshin also provides a unique schema of four types of nenbutsu practice:

- Meditative practice (jōgō 定業): contemplating Amida Buddha in a state of samādhi
- Non-meditative practice (sangō 散業; “practice under taken with a scattered mind”): nenbutsu practiced in daily activities, while walking, standing, etc., without having entered samādhi proper.
- Practice with marks (usōgō 有相業): A meditative nenbutsu which focuses on visualizing Amida's physical marks
- Markless practice (musōgō 無相業): A meditative nenbutsu which includes contemplating Amida and his land in terms of the threefold truth, seeing them "as being simultaneously empty, provisionally existent, and the middle."

Thus, Genshin held that birth in the Pure Land could thus be attained through various forms of nenbutsu, though he saw meditative nenbutsu as the superior practice, even if it was not as accessible for everyone.

In one important passage of the Ōjōyōshū, Genshin explains that the efficacy of the nenbutsu comes from four factors: "the power of one’s past merits, the power of one’s desire to seek birth in the Pure Land, the sustaining power of Amida’s vows, and the nurturing support of the holy sages...primarily great bodhisattvas."

Genshin's perspective on the nenbutsu is somewhat different than that of Hōnen, who argues for the superiority of the non-meditative recitation nenbutsu in his commentaries to the Ōjōyōshū, and attempts to prove that this is Genshin's intent as well. However, according to Rhodes, such an interpretation is not borne out by the Essentials for Birth.

In addition to general practices related to the Pure Land, Genshin also taught special forms of nenbutsu practice to be done on special occasions. These include pratyutpanna samādhi retreat lasting seven days taught in Shandao’s Guannian famen, the ninety day constantly walking samadhi taught by Zhiyi in the Mohe Zhiguan, and the deathbed nenbutsu rite undertaken at the time of death. While the precedence existed in earlier Chinese texts, Genshin spent considerable time in the Ōjōyōshū discussing its importance, and how to concentrate on the Buddha during these trying times by enlisting support from friends to maintain concentration and practice. By maintaining focus until the last breath, Genshin felt that the practitioner would be assured of rebirth in the Pure Land. He felt that if their mind wavered, rebirth was not certain.

As far as the benefits of nenbutsu practice were concerned, Genshin taught that it can eliminate bad karma, call on the protection of Buddhas and other divine beings, allows one to gain visions of the Buddhas, along with helping us avoid bad rebirths and gaining birth in the Pure Land.

==== Other aids to birth in the Pure Land ====
Genshin also recommended auxiliary practices that could support or aid one's nenbutsu practice. According to Genshin: "it is impossible to catch a fowl using a net consisting of just one mesh. (Likewise, it is only by) employing myriad techniques to aid the contemplative mindfulness that the great matter of birth (in the Pure Land) is accomplished." As such, even though Genshin saw the nenbutsu as the central practice, he allowed that Pure Land rebirth could be attained through other methods, writing that “those who seek birth in the Land of Supreme Bliss need not necessarily (practice) the nenbutsu exclusively.”

Genshin argues in chapter nine that one may attain birth in the Pure Land through practices other than the nenbutsu. In this chapter, Genshin lists various sutras and dhāraṇī that one can recite as means for birth in the Pure Land, including: Lotus Sutra, Samantabhadra's vows in the Bhadracaryāpraṇidhāna (from the Huayan Sutra), the Three Thousand Buddha Names Sutra (Sanqian fomingjing 三千佛名經), Wordless Jeweled Casket Sutra (Wuzi baoqiejing 無字寶篋經), Uṣṇīṣavijaya-dhāraṇī, Viśuddhaprabhā-dhāraṇī, Mahāpratisarā Dhāraṇī, Ārya-tārā Dhāraṇī, Amoghapāśa Dhāraṇī, Mantra of Light, Pure Land Rebirth Dhāraṇī.

According to Genshin, additional practices which can help us attain birth in the Pure Land include: "arousing the aspiration for enlightenment; controlling the triple actions (the actions of body, speech, and mind); having deep faith; being sincere; remaining constant in one’s practice; remaining mindful of the buddha (i.e., to practice the nenbutsu); and arousing the vow to be born in the Pure Land." Genshin also cites the Sutra on the Ten Conditions for Birth in the Realm of Amida Buddha (Shiwangsheng amituofoguojing 十往生阿彌陀佛國經) which contains ten different practices that can lead to birth in the Pure Land. They include donating food and clothing to the Buddha and sangha, giving medicine to the sick, non-harming, receiving and keeping the precepts, being filial, and venerating stupas and temples.

Furthermore, Genshin insists that observing the ten major and forty-eight minor preceptsfound in the Brahmajāla Sūtra is enough to attain birth in the Pure Land. As outlined by Rhodes, Genshin also lists the following thirteen deeds that can lead to rebirth there: "practicing charity, both in the material and spiritual sense; taking refuge in the three jewels and keeping the precepts, including the five, eight, and ten precepts for laypeople; cultivating patience; cultivating endeavor; undertaking meditation; cultivating wisdom; arousing the aspiration for enlightenment; cultivating the six kinds of mindfulness (to remain mindful of the Buddha, Dharma, saṅgha, precepts, charity, and heavenly beings); reciting the Mahāyāna sutras; protecting the Buddhist Dharma; caring for one’s parents and attending to one’s teachers and elders; refrainingfrom becoming arrogant; and refraining from seeking fame."

=== Abhidharma ===
Genshin's Daijō tai kushashō is a work of fourteen fascicles that stands as his most extensive composition and far exceeds the length of his other writings. This treatise is particularly significant because it highlights his sustained engagement with abhidharma philosophy. In the preface, he explains that he had long felt the absence, within Mahāyāna Buddhism, of a systematic work comparable to Vasubandhu's Abhidharmakośa. While acknowledging that the Hossō school had integrated abhidharma doctrines into its system, he judged its texts either too voluminous, as in the case of the Yogācārabhūmi, or too compressed and difficult, as with the Chengweishilun. To address this gap, Genshin selected more than five hundred of the Abhidharmakośa’s six hundred verses and provided a Mahāyāna-oriented commentary on them.

The sources he employed to explicate these verses derive largely from Indian Yogācāra materials, making the work in effect a comparative analysis of Sarvāstivādin abhidharma and the Yogācāra. Although Genshin notes assistance from others, the scale and sophistication of the Daijō tai kushashō suggest that it represents the culmination of decades of study. His commitment to abhidharma scholarship did not diminish thereafter. In 1013, only a few years before his death, he completed the Kusharon jusho shōmon, a corrective study addressing a Tang-dynasty commentary on the Abhidharmakośa.

=== One Vehicle teaching ===
In 1006 Genshin’s intellectual trajectory entered a new phase when a serious illness led him to reassess unresolved doctrinal disputes. During his convalescence, he became convinced that it was necessary to establish decisively the Tendai Ekayāna teaching that all beings can attain buddhahood and to reject the Hossō theory of fixed spiritual lineages (gotras). After recovering, and with the assistance of disciples, he undertook a comprehensive review of relevant Indian, Chinese, and Japanese sources, which culminated in the composition of the Ichijō yōketsu (Determining the Essentials of the One Vehicle), a three-fascicle treatise which systematically addresses the core disagreements between Tendai and Hossō, and defends the Tendai view of the universal capacity for Buddhahood. Across eight chapters, Genshin marshals canonical citations to defend the one-vehicle doctrine which says all beings can attain buddhahood, along with the Nirvāṇa Sūtra's view that "all beings without exception have the buddha nature." The Ichijō yōketsu argues that the Lotus Sūtra represents the Buddha’s definitive teaching and that, as affirmed in the Nirvāṇa Sūtra, even those deemed irredeemable within Yogacara soteriology possess the capacity for buddhahood.

Genshin's citations affirm that no being lacks the intrinsic capacity for Buddhahood, and Genshin interprets these statements literally: Buddha-nature denotes the actual potential for Buddhahood, not merely an abstract principle or metaphor. Even when obscured by extreme defilements, this nature remains present and ensures that eventual awakening is possible under appropriate conditions.Hossō scholars rejected this universalism by positing a theory of differentiated spiritual capacities. According to its doctrine of five lineages, beings are innately destined for five distinct attainments: Buddhahood, pratyekabuddhahood, arhatship, indeterminate outcomes, or perpetual transmigration. Icchantikas, identified with “lineageless” beings, were held to lack the causal basis for enlightenment. To reconcile passages in the Mahāparinirvāṇa Sūtra that affirm universal Buddha-nature with this framework, Hossō exegetes developed a distinction between two kinds of Buddha-nature: Buddha-nature as principle (the universal suchness present in all beings) and Buddha-nature as practice or seed (the actual causal capacity for Buddhahood), the latter being absent in some beings who could thus never reach buddhahood.

Genshin rejects this distinction as doctrinally unfounded. He argues that the Buddhist canon provides no basis for separating Buddha-nature into purely nominal and effective forms. When scriptures declare that all beings possess Buddha-nature, they mean precisely that all beings have the real capacity to attain Buddhahood. Genshin further contends that Hossō interpretations distort the intent of key Nirvāṇa Sūtra passages by reading later scholastic categories back into the text. Statements warning against asserting either absolute existence or absolute nonexistence of Buddha-nature, he maintains, are meant to express its emptiness and transcendence of conceptual extremes, not to justify an internal division within Buddha-nature itself.

Furthermore, according to Genshin, the scriptural passages that deny icchantikas the possibility of full awakening should be interpreted as pedagogical warnings, intended to discourage rejection of the Mahāyāna and to emphasize the grave karmic consequences of slandering the Dharma. Later passages affirming their eventual awakening represent the Buddha’s final and complete position. In support of this interpretation, Genshin cites the Ratnagotravibhāga and the Buddha Nature Treatise. Genshin also argues that since all phenomena arise through causes and conditions, no being is fixed by nature as irredeemable. He then cites the Lotus Sutra in defense of this view, which states: "The Buddhas, the most venerable of two-legged beings, know that dharmas are etemally devoid of (self) natures. The seed of the Buddha arises through conditions. For this reason, they preach the One Vehicle." Thus, even the most depraved beings have Buddha-nature, which, though long obscured, can be activated through appropriate causes and conditions.

Genshin's composition of the Ichijō yōketsu was motivated by doctrinal concerns and also by concrete institutional pressures. The earlier Ōwa Debate had failed to fully resolve the question of universal buddhahood, leaving the Tendai position weakened in the public eye despite institutional gains by its leaders. As one of the foremost Tendai scholars of his time, Genshin likely felt a responsibility to provide a definitive clarification. More urgently, the unresolved controversy threatened the doctrinal foundations of his Pure Land commitments, particularly the activities of Genshin's nenbutsu society, which presupposed that all beings could attain rebirth in the Pure Land and eventual buddhahood. If the Hossō theory of five lineages were correct, this universal salvific claim would collapse. Genshin’s illness appears to have been the decisive catalyst that compelled him to articulate a comprehensive defense of universal buddhahood.

Genshin's Ichijō yōketsu helped promote the Tendai view of universal buddhahood, a view that was influential on later Japanese Buddhism. Although Hossō scholars continued to defend their view that some icchantikas could not attain buddhahood, this became a minority view by the Kamakura period. By this time, most of the major Buddhist schools in Japan, including the new Kamakura schools, accepted the Tendai position on the universality of buddha-nature.

== Works ==
In all, Genshin left more than 30 works which continue to influence Pure Land thought today.

His major works include the following:

- Inmyōronsho Shisōi Ryakuchūshaku (Abridged Commentary on the Four Divergences in the Treatise on Logic) (3 fascicles)
- Ōjōyōshū (3 fascicles)
- Nijūgo Zanmai Shiki , a guide for the members of the zanmai-e (meditation assemblies) dedicated to the practice of nenbutsu-samadhi
- Daijō Tai Kushashō (A Comparison between Mahāyāna and the Abhidharmakośa) (14 fascicles)
- Ichijō Yōketsu (Essentials of the One Vehicle) (3 fascicles)
- Hokkekyō Gidoku (1 fascicle)
- Yokawa Hogo 横川法語
- Amida-kyō Ryakuki (Abridged Notes on the Amitābha Sūtra) (1 fascicle)
- Yōhōbun (3 fascicles)
- Bodaishin Giyōbun (1 fascicle)
- Ryōzen-in Shakadō Mainichi Sahō (1 fascicle)
- Hakkotsukan (1 fascicle)
- Sonshō yōmon 尊勝要文 (Essential Passages on Butchō Sonshō) a work on the Sarvadurgati-pariśodhana uṣṇīṣavijayā dhāraṇī
- Gokuraku rokujisan 極樂六時讚 (Hymn for the Land of Supreme Bliss for the Six Watches of the Day), popularly known as the Rokuji wasan 六時和讚 (Hymn in Japanese for the Six Watches of the Day).

=== Hongaku texts ===
There are several other texts which have been attributed to Genshin that modern scholars see as apocryphal, including various Pure Land hongaku texts like the Kanjin ryakuyōshū, Shinnyō kan 真如観 (Contemplation of Suchness), Jigyō nenbutsu mondō, Myōgyōshin yōshū, and the Makura sōshi. In spite of this, the contemporary Tendai tradition still treats these works as part of Genshin's corpus. This conservative view is based on the fact that they are still texts which arose in Genshin's Eshin lineage and they are seen as transmitting his oral teachings.

The Kanjin ryakuyōshū (Abbreviated Collection of Passages on Mind Contemplation), a brief treatise traditionally attributed to Genshin and known for interpreting the name “Muryōju” in terms of the Tendai three truths and for linking Pure Land rebirth to contemplation of one’s own mind, has long been the subject of serious doubts regarding its authorship. Bibliographic evidence weighs strongly against its authenticity: the text is absent from Genshin’s early biographies, appears only in later medieval catalogues, is first explicitly cited in the fourteenth century, and survives today only in much later printed editions. Early modern and modern scholars have argued that its doctrinal orientation reflects the original enlightenment (hongaku) thought that gained prominence after Genshin’s lifetime and that it belongs to a broader pattern of posthumous works falsely attributed to him. More recent research has strengthened this conclusion by identifying quotations in the Kanjin ryakuyōshū from texts composed after Genshin’s death and by noting internal references that presuppose a temporal distance from Genshin himself. On this basis, the work is now generally regarded as a later composition, probably dating from the late eleventh or twelfth century, rather than a genuine product of Genshin.

Another example is the Kūkan (Contemplation of Emptiness). As noted by Stone, this text contains one of the earliest mentions of the daimoku, which is recommended as part of the phrase: Namu Amida Butsu, Namu Myōhō Renge Kyō, Namu Kanzeon Bosatsu". Similar passages which contain the daimoku as a devotional chant are also found in the works of Genshin's disciples Kakuun (953–1007) and Kakuchō (952/960–1034).

== Legacy ==
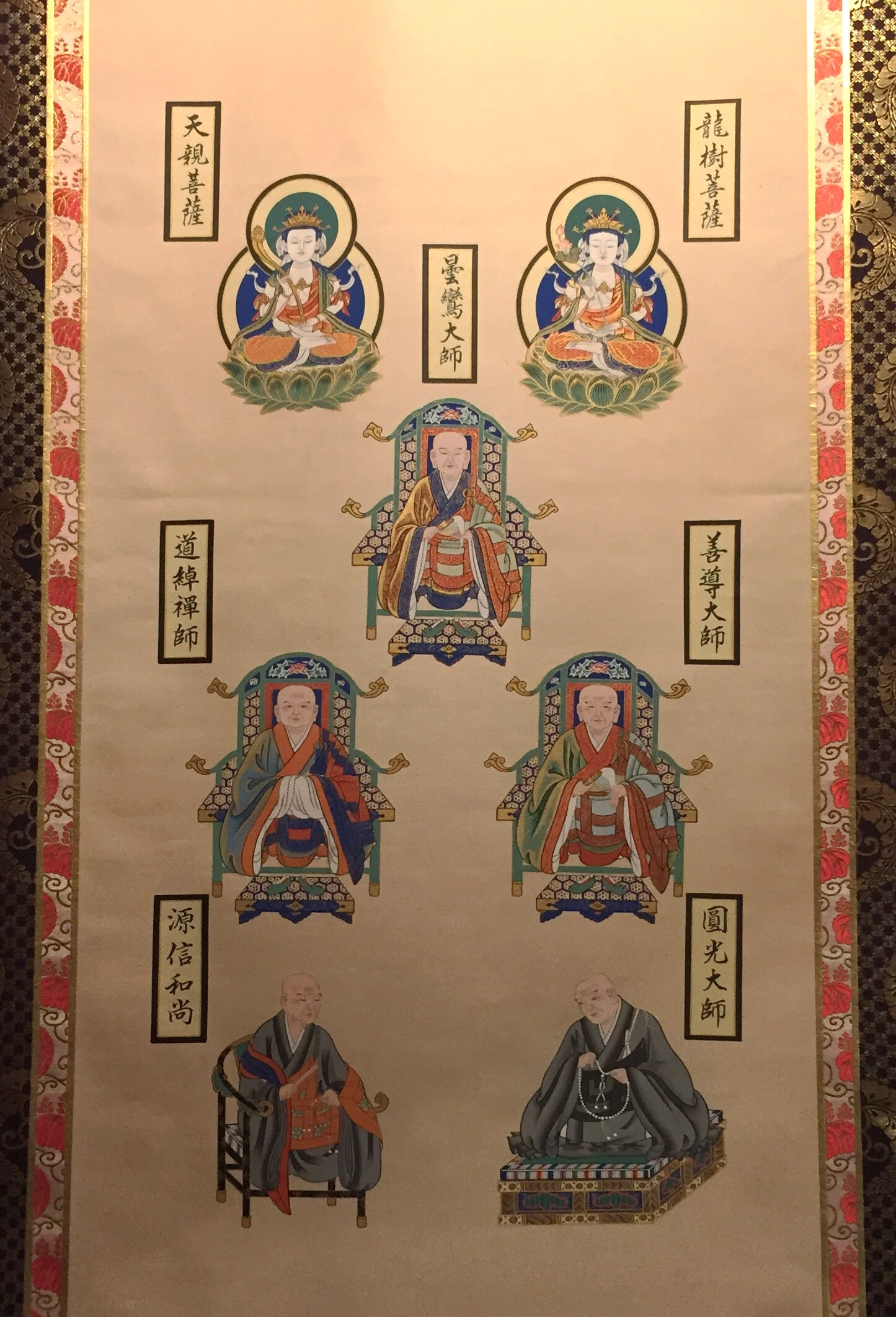
Shinshū scroll depicting the seven Pure Land patriarchs with Genshin on the lower left corner

Today, Genshin is credited as the founding patriarch of the Eshin-ryū lineage of Tendai Buddhism. This tradition was later known as a stronghold of the "original enlightenment" teaching, or hongaku (本覚).

=== Pure Land activities ===
Genshin is most well known today for his Pure Land works, and is regarded as a patriarch of Japanese Pure Land Buddhism. The Essentials for Birth (Ōjōyōshū) was very influential in Japan, and Rhodes calls it "one of the most well-known works in the history of Japanese religions." The text was particularly important for the development of Japanese Pure Land Buddhism, and according to Rhodes, "it was through this text that Pure Land Buddhism became firmly rooted in Japan." The Ōjōyōshū is known to have influenced later Pure Land figures such as Ryōnin, Hōnen, Shinran and Benchō. The first commentary on the text, the Ōjōyōshū giki 往生要集義記, was composed by Ryōchū, the third patriarch of Jōdo-shū's Chinzei branch.

However, some scholars like Sarah Horton have argued against the widespread scholarly assumption that the rapid spread of Pure Land Buddhism across all levels of Japanese society in the eleventh century was especially due to Genshin's Ōjōyōshū. By analyzing contemporary sources, Horton finds that the text's influence in the early eleventh century has been overstated. Instead, Horton proposes that Genshin’s pivotal role in Heian Pure Land Buddhism stemmed more from his active leadership and participation in various religious fellowships, particularly those at Yokawa.

Nevertheless, the popular Pure Land teacher Hōnen, founder of the Jōdo-shū, was significantly influenced by the Ōjōyōshū. This is reflected in Hōnen's four Ōjōyōshū commentaries, which consistently argue that Genshin’s essential purpose was to promote the nenbutsu, especially the vocal nenbutsu, as the central Pure Land practice. In his most detailed commentary, the Ōjōyōshū shaku, Hōnen structures his analysis arounends that within the Ōjōyōshū’s extensive array of practices, the nenbutsu alone is essential, while all other practices are non-essential. Hōnen supports this by citing passages where Genshin highlights the nenbutsu’s primacy, interpreting them as evidence that Genshin intended practitioners to “cast away the difficult and take up the easy.” Hōnen further analyzes the Ōjōyōshū on three levels: broad, abbreviated, and essential. He identifies the “Summary of the Essential Practices” section as the text’s condensed core, listing seven key practices. Even within this shortlist, Hōnen argues that the recitative nenbutsu is paramount, using Genshin’s own words about the practice a framework of selection and rejection. He concludes that the Ōjōyōshū’s ultimate, “essential” message is the advocacy of exclusive recitative nenbutsu, an interpretation not supported by the Ōjōyōshū itself according to Rhodes. While Genshin presented the nenbutsu as primary within an inclusive system supported by auxiliary practices, Hōnen reinterpreted the text to justify an exclusive nenbutsu practice that sets aside other practices.

Genshin's influence is also recognized in the Jōdo Shinshū tradition, where Genshin is revered as the sixth of the Seven Patriarchs and is honored as "Genshin Kashō" or "Genshin Daishi." Shinran, the founder of Shinshū, added Genshin to his list of Pure Land patriarchs. Shinran often quotes him in the Kyōgyōshinshō, and interprets his teaching in a similar way to Hōnen. Shinran also praised the master in the Shōshinge (Hymn of True Faith and the Nembutsu) and in the Hymns of the Pure Land Masters.

Since the Ōjōyōshū does not promote the same view of Hōnen's exclusive vocal nenbutsu, some scholars like Itō Toshihiro have attempted to understand how Hōnen and Shinran came to read the text differently. Toshihiro notes how at the beginning of the Ōjōyōshū, Genshin says the he does not consider himself capable of the difficult practices of the Tendai school. He also discusses his worry about the salvation of common and evil people. Operetto also notes that the earliest biography of Genshin, the Kakochō, mentions that Genshin himself focused on the practice of vocal nenbutsu. It also has him state "I only recite the Name (of Amida Buddha)...the recitation of the Name suffices as the practice for attaining birth (into Amida’s Pure Land). Because I have this notion from the beginning, I do not contemplate the principle. If one wishes to contemplate it, it is not difficult. When I contemplate the principle, I reach (a state where) my mind is clear, and there is no obstruction." Furthermore, according to Rhodes, it is possible that Genshin focused on vocal nenbutsu in his later years, and his late commentary on the Amidakyō also focuses on this practice. However, other sources like the Hokke Genki depict Genshin as a devotee of the Lotus Sutra, and as practicing contemplative nenbutsu and sutra recitation in his final days. Genshin's own list of his own practices include numerous other practices apart from the nenbutsu Thus, Genshin likely did not practice the vocal nenbutsu exclusively by setting aside all other Tendai practices like reciting the Lotus Sutra.

=== The Ichijō yōketsu ===
Genshin's Ichijō yōketsu was also important for the development of later Japanese Buddhism. According to Serena Operetto, Genshin's defense of the Tendai view of universal enlightenment was so influential that:

Even Hossō monks of later generations were forced to reconcile their doctrine of the five lineages of people with the One-vehicle. This is particularly the case for Jōkei 貞慶 (1155–1213), who admitted the truth of the doctrine of the One-vehicle was equal to that of the five lineages of people. And his successor Ryōhen 良遍 (1194–1252) also insisted on syncretizing the two, asserting that there is no contradiction between them. This does not mean that all Hossō scholars did not try to counterattack Genshin’s argumentations, nor that they accepted the supremacy of Tendai thought on this theme. Nonetheless, from the moment the Ichijō yōketsu was composed, no Buddhist scholar of the medieval period could dismiss the idea that all beings bar none, are able to achieve Buddhahood. Thus, the belief in universal Buddhahood came to be commonly assumed among all Buddhist traditions in medieval Japan.

The influence of the Ichijō yōketsu can be seen in the work of later Japanese Buddhist thinkers like Nichiren and Shinran. Nichiren frequently relied on Genshin's work rather than directly on sutras, evidenced by shared textual variations and terminology. This influence is clear in Nichiren's writings on universal enlightenment and the nature of icchantikas. Furthermore, Nichiren created a condensed version of Genshin's treatise, focusing on passages about grave offenses and slanderers of the Dharma, and his annotated copy of the Lotus Sutra contains numerous overt and implicit references to the Ichijō yōketsu, often rearranging Genshin's arguments to support his own teachings.

=== Other ===
The image of Amida Nyorai in the main building of Yasaka-ji Temple in Shikoku is said to have been made by Genshin in the Heian Period.

Genshin's influence in contemporary Japanese culture today is primarily due to his Ōjōyōshū, particularly its graphic descriptions of the Buddhist hell realms (地獄 jigoku), which inspired a genre of horror and morality stories. The 1960 Japanese film Jigoku was influenced by Genshin's Ōjōyōshū. In the manga and anime Jujutsu Kaisen, the corpse of Genshin functions as a "prison realm," likely playing on the themes of the underworld within Genshin's works.

== See also ==
- Siming Zhili
- Zongxiao
- Ennin
- Senkan
- Hōnen

== Sources ==
- Andrews, Allan A. The Teachings Essential for Rebirth: A study of Genshin’s Ōjōyōshū. Monumenta Nipponica, Sophia University, 1973.
- Horton, Sarah (2004). The Influence of the Ōjōyōshū in Late Tenth- and Early Eleventh-Century Japan, Japanese Journal of Religious Studies 31 (1), 29-54
- Operetto, Serena (2023). "The Reception of Genshin's Ichijō yōketsu 一乗要決 in Japanese Medieval Buddhism - An Intertextual Analysis", pp. 224–227. Hamburg Buddhist Studies 18, Numata Center for Buddhist Studies.
- Rhodes, Robert F. (2007). Ōjōyōshū, Nihon Ōjō Gokuraku-ki, and the Construction of Pure Land Discourse in Heian Japan, Japanese Journal of Religious Studies 34 (2), 249-270
- Rhodes, Robert F. (2001). Some Problems concerning Genshin's Biographies, Journal of Indian and Buddhist Studies (Indogaku Bukkyogaku Kenkyu) 50 (1), 514-511
- Rhodes, Robert F. (2017). Genshin's Ōjōyōshū and the Construction of Pure Land Discourse in Heian Japan (Pure Land Buddhist Studies). University of Hawaii Press. ISBN 978-0824872489.
- Stone, Jacqueline Ilyse (2003), "Original enlightenment and the transformation of medieval Japanese Buddhism" (PDF), Studies in East Asian Buddhism, University of Hawaii Press, ISBN 978-0-8248-2771-7, archived from the original (PDF) on 5 November 2013
