= Ōjō =

The term Ōjō (Japanese: 往生) is a term in Japanese Buddhism for rebirth in the Pure Land of Amitabha Buddha. Sometimes the term is expressed as Ōjō gokuraku (往生極楽, rebirth in the land of ultimate happiness). The subject of how to obtain birth in the Pure Land remained an important question throughout Japanese Buddhist history even until today.

== The Nara Schools ==
The early Nara Buddhism schools provided different opinions as to how to obtain rebirth in the Pure Land, though in some cases, such as the Hossō school taught that icchantikas (people who committed the Five Grave Acts) could not obtain rebirth ever. Other schools taught that while accessible to all, the rituals involved were difficult, or that rebirth was not desirable.

== Tendai and Shingon ==
Early sects, particularly the Tendai and Shingon sects relied on esoteric texts, or interpretations of the Contemplation Sutra to develop rituals and visualizations of rebirth in the Pure Land. Genshin, a Tendai monk, wrote the Ōjōyōshū in which he described the horrors of Hell in Buddhism, and the delights of the Pure Land of Amitabha Buddha, then teaches the importance of reciting the nembutsu while maintaining a regimen of visualization and meditation practices.

For the Tendai sect in particular, the importance of rebirth in the Pure Land gained prominence among Saichō's later disciples, almost equal in importance to the central teaching of the Lotus Sutra.

== Kamakura Buddhism ==
As new, reform Buddhist sects arose in the Kamakura period, the importance of the concept of the Age of Dharma Decline gained prominence during this difficult period in history. It was during this time that independent schools of Jōdo and Jōdo Shinshū arose, with Hōnen teaching based on the Larger Sutra that rebirth could be obtained, even for icchantikas, solely by reciting Amitabha's name: the nembutsu. Hōnen's doctrine led to resistance among monks of the more traditional and state-sanctioned sects, leading to persecution or alternate teachings. One of Hōnen's sharpest critics, Myoe, taught another means of rebirth in the Pure Land through chanting of the Mantra of Light as a counter to Hōnen's doctrine.
