= Mii-dera =

Buddhist temple in Shiga Prefecture, Japan

Coordinates: 35°00′48″N 135°51′10″E

Mii-dera 三井寺
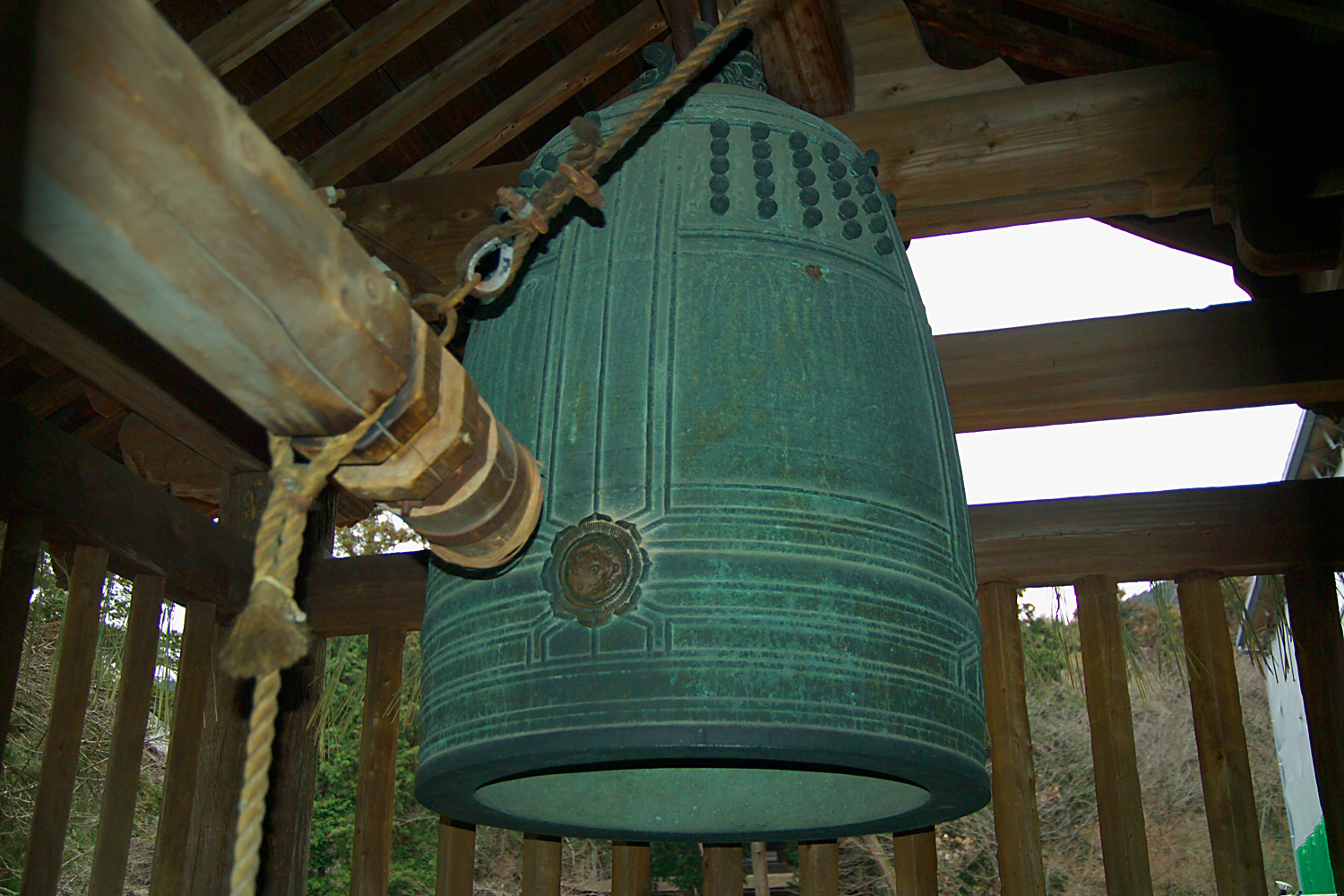
- (Mii-dera no Bansho (三井寺の晩鐘)), the evening bell at Mii-dera

- Location within Shiga Prefecture Location within Japan

Religion
- Affiliation: Buddhist
- Deity: Miroku Bosatsu
- Rite: Jimon Tendai

Location
- Location: 246 Onjō-ji-chō, Ōtsu, Shiga Prefecture
- Country: Japan
- Interactive map of Mii-dera 三井寺

Architecture
- Founder: Emperor Tenmu
- Established: 672
- Completed: 19th century (Reconstruction)

Website
- www.shiga-miidera.or.jp/

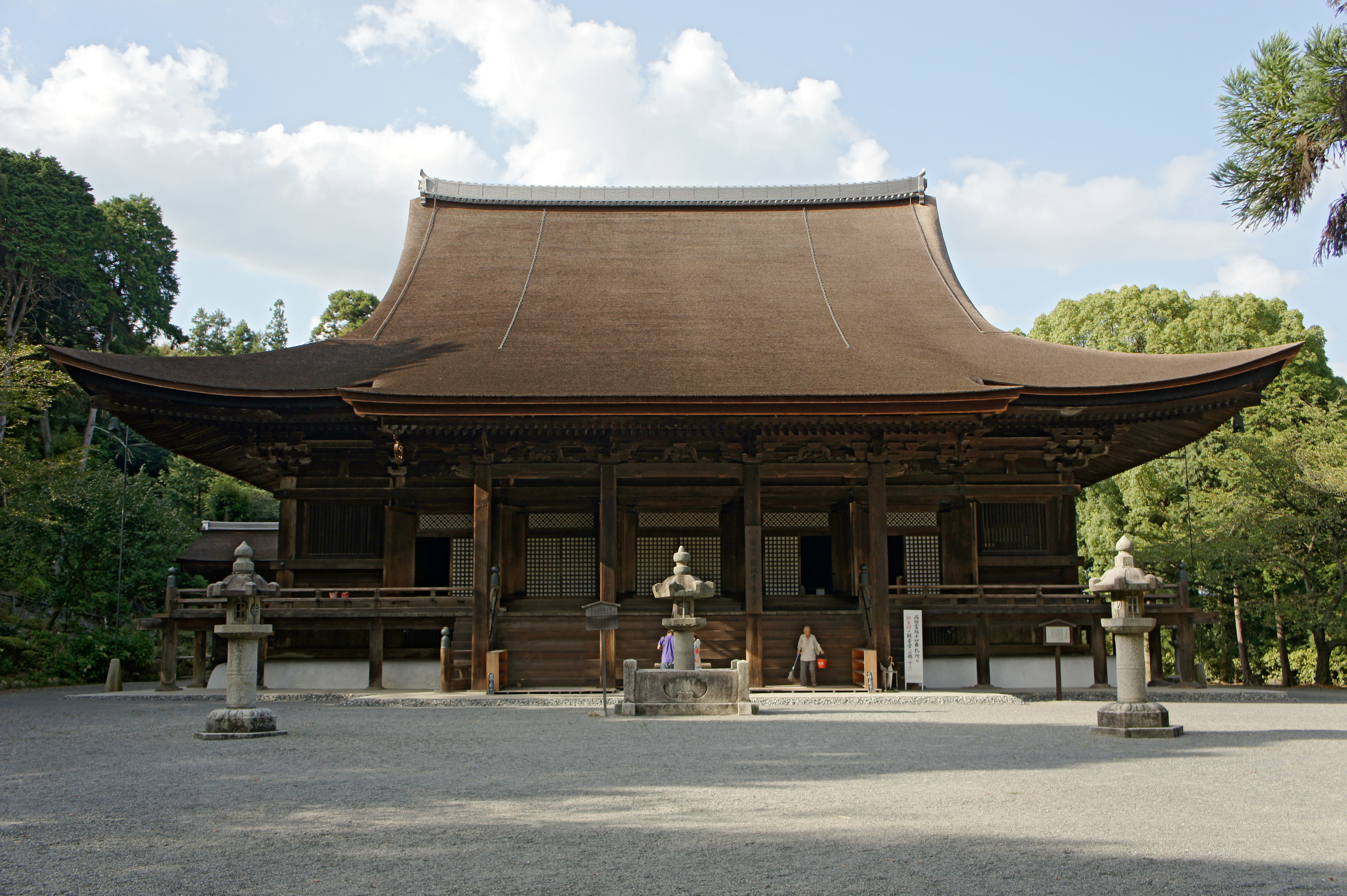
Golden Hall (National Treasure of Japan)

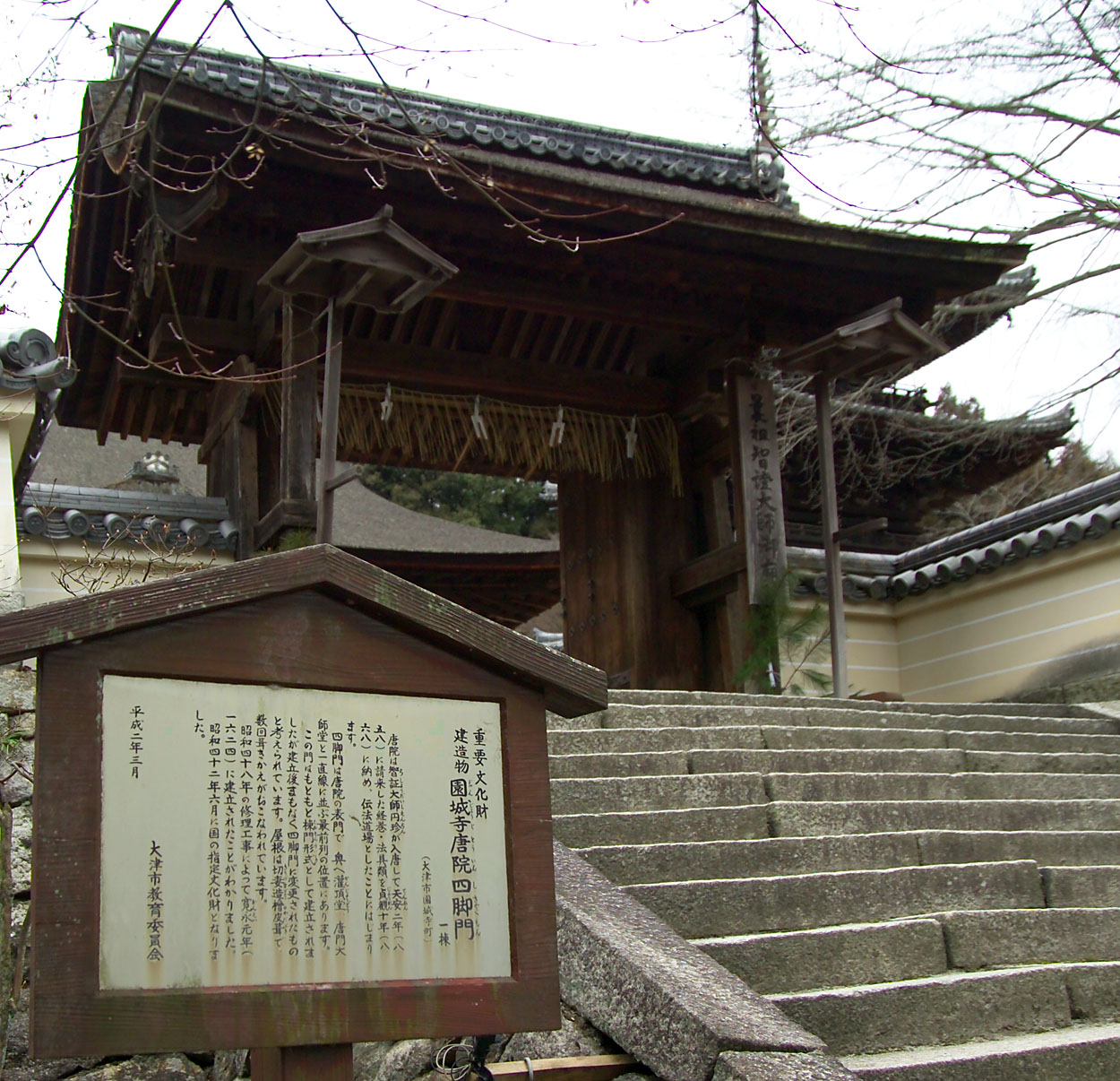
The Shikyaku-mon or "Four-Legged Gate"

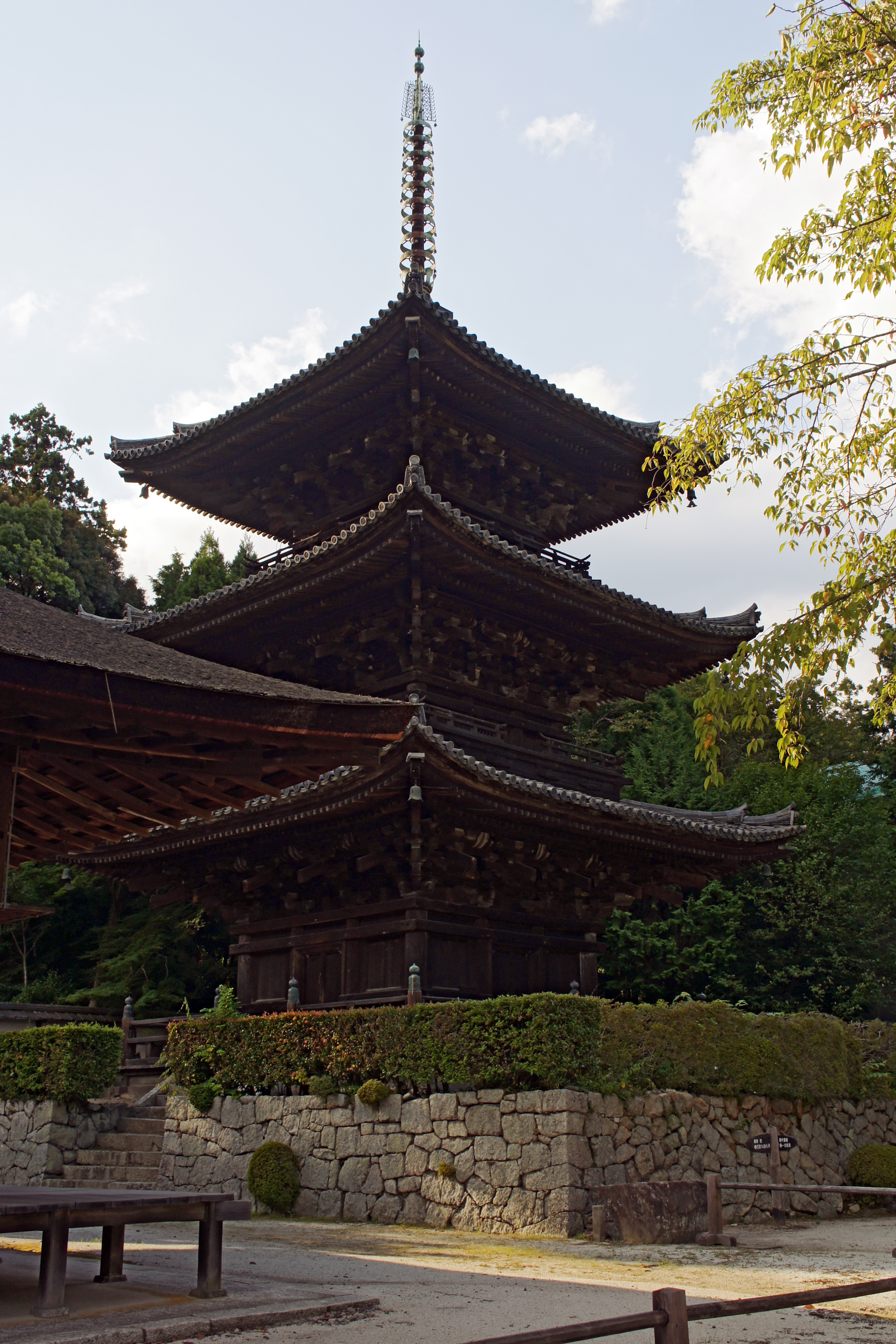

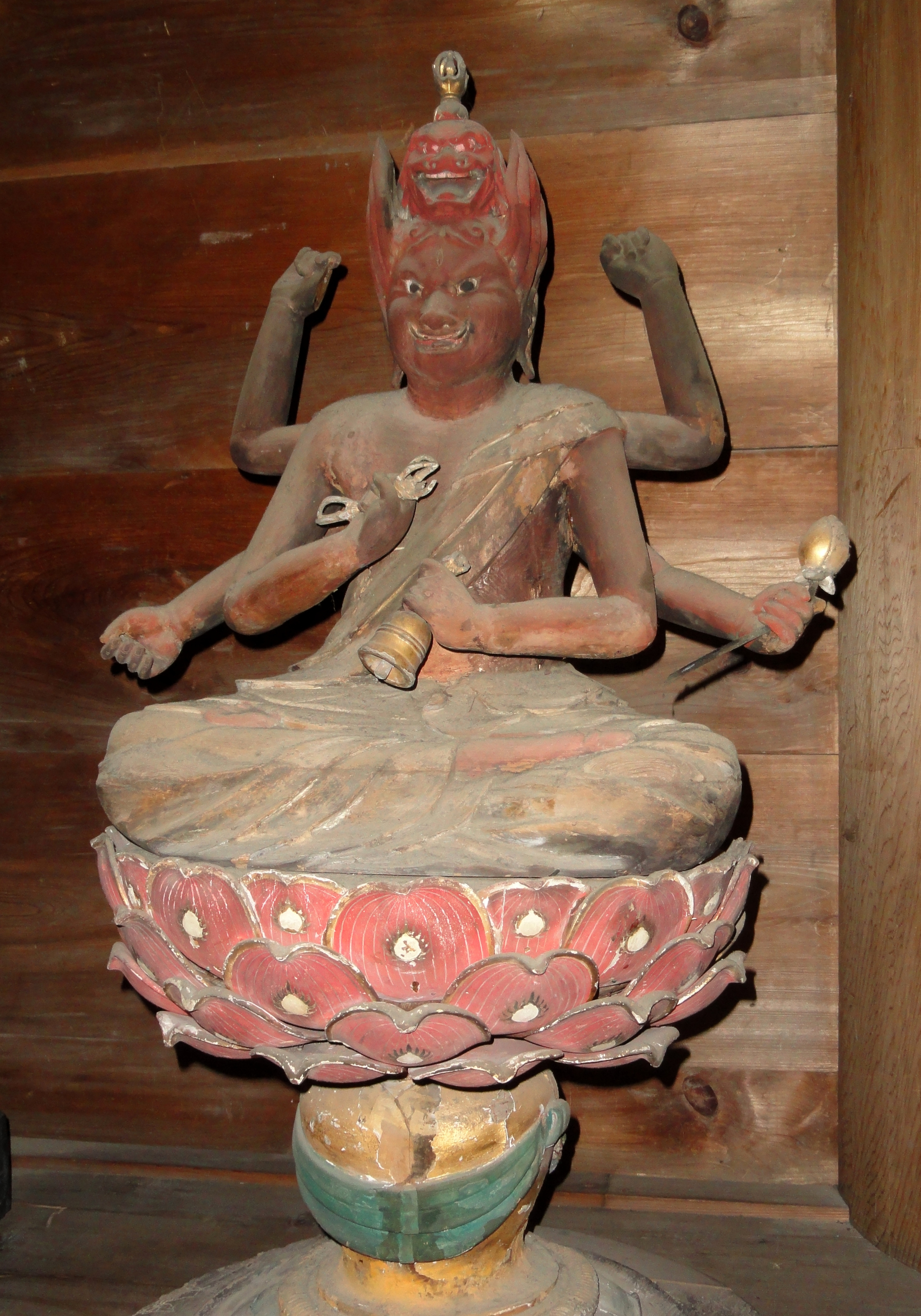
Rāgarāja

Video

Nagara-san Onjo-ji (長等山園城寺, Nagarasan Onjōji), also known as just Onjo-ji, or Mii-dera (三井寺), is a Buddhist temple in Japan located at the foot of Mount Hiei, in the city of Ōtsu in Shiga Prefecture. It is a short distance from both Kyoto, and Lake Biwa, Japan's largest lake. The head temple of the Jimon sect of Tendai, it is a sister temple to Enryaku-ji, at the top of the mountain, and is one of the four largest temples in Japan. Altogether, there are 40 named buildings in the Mii-dera complex.

Mii-dera is temple 14 in the Saigoku Kannon Pilgrimage.

== History ==
=== Founding, and feuds ===
Onjō-ji was founded in the Nara period. The temple was founded in 672 following a dispute over Imperial succession. Emperor Tenji had died, and his son was killed by Tenji's brother, who was then enthroned as Emperor Tenmu. Temmu founded Onjō-ji in honor and memory of his brother.

The name Mii-dera ("Temple of Three Wells") came about nearly two centuries later. It was given this name by Enchin, one of the earliest abbots of the Tendai Sect. The name comes from the springs at the temple which were used for the ritual bathing of newborns, and in honor of Emperors Emperor Tenji and Emperor Tenmu, and Empress Jitō, who contributed to the founding of the temple. Today, the Kondō, or Main Hall, houses a spring of sacred water. Under Enchin's guidance, from 859 to his death in 891, Mii-dera gained power and importance, eventually becoming (along with Tōdai-ji, Kōfuku-ji, and Enryaku-ji) one of the four chief temples charged with the spiritual guidance and protection of the capital. It was during this time also that Enryaku-ji and Mii-dera split away from one another, developing two branches of the Tendai sect, called Jimon and Sanmon. For the most part, this was more a geographic rivalry than an ideological schism, but it was an intense one nonetheless, and only grew more severe after Enchin's death.

The rivalry turned violent in the second half of the 10th century, over a series of official appointments to other temples, and similar slights. The zasu of Enryaku-ji in 970 formed the first permanent standing army to be recruited by a religious body. Mii-dera can be assumed to have established one very soon afterwards. In 989, a former abbot of Mii-dera by the name of Yokei was to become abbot of Enryaku-ji; but none of the monks of Enryaku-ji would perform services under his direction. He soon resigned. But in 993, the monks of Mii-dera took revenge, destroying a temple where Ennin, founder of Enryaku-ji's Sanmon sect, had once lived. The monks from Enryaku-ji retaliated, destroying more than 40 places associated with Enchin. In the end, over 1,000 monks of Enchin's Jimon sect fled permanently to Mii-dera, cementing the split between the two Sects. Over the course of the 10th, 11th and 12th centuries, there continued to be similar incidents, over the appointment of abbots (zasu), involving many sōhei, or warrior monks. Mii-dera was burned to the ground by the sōhei of Enryaku-ji four times in the 11th century alone. There were, however, times that the two united against a common enemy, including an attack on the Kōfuku-ji in Nara in 1081 (avenging the burning of the Mii-dera by Kōfuku-ji monks that same year), and a united attack on Nara once more in 1117.

=== The Genpei Wars ===
At the end of the 12th century, the attentions of the monks of Mount Hiei were turned towards a greater conflict: the Genpei War. The Taira and Minamoto families supported different claimants to the Chrysanthemum Throne, and in June 1180, the Minamoto brought their claimant, Prince Mochihito, to the Mii-dera, fleeing from Taira samurai. Mii-dera asked for aid from Enryaku-ji, but was denied. The monks of the Mii-dera joined the Minamoto army, and fled to the Byōdō-in, a Fujiwara clan villa, which had been converted to a monastery by Mii-dera monks (see Battle of Uji (1180)).

Angered at the Mii-dera/Minamoto alliance, Taira no Kiyomori ordered the destruction of Mii-dera, and of many of the temples of Nara (see Siege of Nara).

The monks of Mii-dera figured once more in the Genpei War, fighting alongside Taira sympathisers against Minamoto no Yoshinaka, who invaded Kyoto in 1184, setting fire to the Hōjūjidono Palace and kidnapping the retired emperor, Shirakawa II.

Following the Genpei War, there was a long period of relative peace, as the temples of Kyoto and Nara, including the Mii-dera, were rebuilt. As the temples regained strength, rivalries reappeared, though little to no violence actually erupted between Mii-dera and Enryaku-ji. In 1367, when a novice from Mii-dera was killed at a toll barrier established by the temple of Nanzen-ji, warrior monks from Mii-dera set out to attack Nanzen-ji; when the shōgun's forces were sent to quell the rebellion, they discovered Mii-dera's monks to be supported by sōhei from Enryaku-ji and Kōfuku-ji as well. A year later, another battle erupted, over comments made by the abbot of Nanzen-ji; the monks of Mii-dera, along with their allies, defeated the shogun's forces once again.

=== Sengoku period and beyond ===
In the late 16th century, Mii-dera, along with many of the other nearby temples, sought alliances, for military (defensive) strength, as well as military power. The territories of the Asai and Asakura families were closest to Mount Hiei, but these families, as well as others the temples had allied with, were rivals of Oda Nobunaga. These two families suffered heavy defeats at the hands of Nobunaga and his chief general Toyotomi Hideyoshi, so in 1571 they sought a stronger alliance with the temples. That same year, Nobunaga set to destroying everything on Mount Hiei, starting with the town of Sakamoto at the foot of the mountain, and setting his sights on Enryaku-ji at the summit. Much of Mii-dera was destroyed, as the warrior monks failed against Nobunaga's large and highly trained samurai army.

Following these attacks, the monks of Mount Hiei were finally granted a reprieve, and rebuilt their temples once more. Mii-dera has never been attacked or destroyed since then.

== Halls and treasures ==
Within the Main Hall (Kondō) and Buddha Hall (Hondo) of Mii-dera, there are at least six statues of the Buddha, sacred personal possessions of various emperors of Japan including Emperor Tenji, which are hidden away and shown only on rare, special occasions, as well as one large statue of Maitreya in the center of the Hall. The Kondō was built in 1599, and is a replacement for the original, built in 672 and destroyed in 1571.

Mii-dera also has a Kannon-dō, built in 1072.

The evening bell of Mii-dera appears in many tales and legends, including one of the sōhei Benkei and another of a woman who dared to touch it.

== Sub-temples ==
=== Enman-in ===
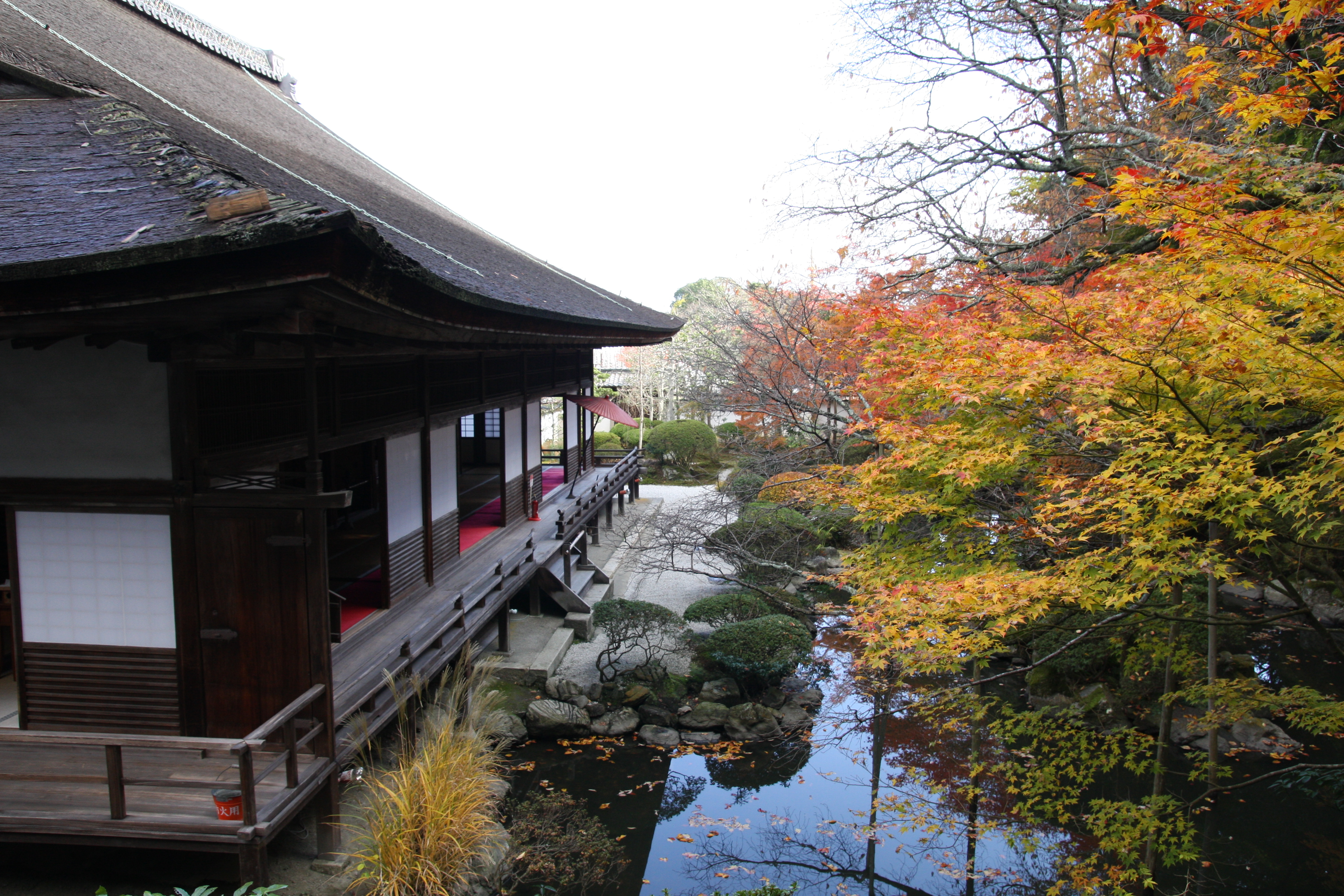
Enman-in and gardens

The Enman-in (円満院) is a sub-temple (tatchū (塔頭)) of Mii-dera. It may have been founded in 987 AD by Prince Goen, the son of Emperor Murakami in Okazaki in Kyoto, where it was called the Byōdō-in, although other records state that it was built with the support of Emperor Go-Suzaku in 1040 under the name of Enman-in. In 1052, the Kanpaku Fujiwara no Yorimichi changed his father's villa in Uji into a temple, which became the famous Byōdō-in, and the original Byōdō-in in Okazaki was renamed the "Mii-Byōdō-in" due to its connection with Mii-dera, or the Sakurai-no-miya as recognition that it was a monzeki temple with an Imperial prince as head abbot. It was relocated to its present location within the precincts of Miii-dera in the early Edo Period. Its Shinden-zukuri style main residence was a gift of Empress Meishō in 1647. It was originally built in 1619 for use by Tokugawa Masako, the daughter of Shogun Tokugawa Hidetada and wife of Emperor Go-Mizunoo. The floor plan consists of a total of 6 rooms in 2 rows from north to south, and there is also a throne used by Emperor Mizunoo in one room in the northwest.The Kano school wall paintings in this structure were designated an Important Cultural Property in 1929; however, the painting in situ are reproductions, with the actual works stored at the Kyoto National Museum for preservation.

The Enman-in teien (円満院庭園) gardens was designated a National Place of Scenic Beauty in 1934. The layout of the garden is attributed to Sōami, who is also responsible by for the rock garden at Ginkaku-ji in Kyoto.

Within the grounds of Enman-in is also the Otsu-e Museum (大津絵美術館, Otsu-e bijutsukan) with a collection of Otsu-e votive prints which were popular with travelers on the Tōkaidō and Nakasendō roads in the Edo Period.

=== Kōjō-in ===
The Kōjō-in (光浄院) is a sub-temple (塔頭, tatchū) of Mii-dera, built by Yamaoka Kagetomo (山岡景友) (1541–1604). The Yamaoka clan was a cadet branch of the Rokkaku clan native to Ōmi Province, and Yamaoka Kagetomo was one of Toyotomi Hideyoshi's generals. He took the tonsure in 1584, becoming Yamaoka Dōami (道阿弥). Following Hideyoshi's death, he pledged fealty to Tokugawa Ieyasu and in 1603 became daimyō of the 10,000 koku Hitachi-Futto Domain in what is now Inashiki, Ibaraki. In 1601, he sponsored the construction of this chapel within Mii-dera.

The Kōjō-in is noteworthy for its Kyakuden (客殿), or Guest Hall, which was completed in 1601. This six by seven bay structure with a wood-shingled irimoya-zukuri roof has been designated as a National Treasure as a representative example of Shoin-zukuri architecture of the late Muromachi period. It is decorated inside with paintings by the Kano school, notably fusuma paintings by Kanō Sanraku. These painting were designated an Important Cultural Property in 1976.

The Kōjō-in teien (光浄院庭園) gardens was designated a National Place of Scenic Beauty in 1934. The gardens contain a large pond which extends almost to the edge of the verandah of the Kyakuden. The pond contains a central island and a number of monoliths, as a grouping of stones forming a dry waterfall giving a sense of depth. The garden is planted with trees and flowers which reflect the composition of the paintings within the Kyakuden.

The Kōjō-in and its gardens are open to the public only by reservation at least a week in advance.

=== Zenpō-in ===
The Zenpō-in (善法院) was a sub-temple (塔頭, tatchū) of Mii-dera, used as a retreat by its highest-ranking prelates. It was located between the Three-story Pagoda and the Kyōzō library of Mii-dera, but no structures remain today. The sub-temple was noted for its very large gardens, the Zenpō-in teien (善法院庭園), which were commented upon in several Edo Period works on famous gardens in Japan, (including the "Omi Koshiji Sakuden" and "Tsukiyama Niwazoden") and were designated a National Place of Scenic Beauty in 1934. However, the gardens were destroyed in a landslide following heavy rains in 1941. The original layout diagrams for the gardens were later re-discovered, and archaeological excavations found that the edges of the pond and many of the stones of the garden were preserved in good condition. Reconstruction work commenced in 2017.

== See also ==
- List of Buddhist temples
- List of Historic Sites of Japan (Shiga)
- List of Places of Scenic Beauty of Japan (Shiga)
- List of National Treasures of Japan (residences)
- List of National Treasures of Japan (temples)
- List of National Treasures of Japan (ancient documents)
- List of National Treasures of Japan (paintings)
- List of National Treasures of Japan (sculptures)
- Miidera (play)
