= Senkan =

Senkan (Japanese: 千觀, 918–984) was a prominent Japanese Buddhist monk of the Tendai school during the mid-Heian period. He was known for his scholarship and contributions to Pure Land Buddhism.

== Life ==
Senkan was the son of Tachibana no Toshisada, the governor of Sagami Province and a descendant of Tachibana no Kimiyori. He entered the priesthood at Onjo-ji Temple, where he received the religious precepts and studied the Tendai school's exoteric and esoteric teachings under the guidance of Gyoyo (or Unsho according to some accounts).

Weary of temple politics, in 962, Senkan retreated to Mount Minō in Settsu Province for intensive study and practice. In around 962, Senkan compiled the Hokke sanshū sōtaishō 法華三宗相對抄 (Extracts on the Comparison [of the Interpretations] of the Lotus Sutra by the Three Schools), a huge fifty-fascicle study examining the interpretations of the Lotus Sutra by the Hosso, Sanron, and Tendai schools. This scholarly endeavor established Senkan as a major figure in Buddhist intellectual circles. He was also credited, alongside Genshin, with composing twelve gikasho (debate position papers), reflecting his influence in Buddhist debate culture.

In 963, at the request of the imperial court, Senkan performed a rain-making ceremony that was reportedly successful, demonstrating his reputation for spiritual efficacy. Subsequently, he revived Konryūji 金龍寺 (Ama-dera Temple) in Settsu Province (modern-day Takatsuki City) and resided there with a community of disciples who engaged in Pure Land practice. Senkan devoted himself to the Pure Land teachings. He is credited with composing the Praise of Amida (Amida wasan 阿彌陀和讚) considered the first recorded Wasan (Japanese language hymn) intended to promote the Pure Land practice among the people. According to a historical source, “it was recited in the capital and in the provinces, by both the old and the young.”

Senkan was invited to participate in the Owa debates, a major series of Tendai doctrinal discussions with the Hosso school over the issue of the universality of Buddha-nature, but declined, possibly to distance himself from the political ambitions of Ryogen, a prominent Tendai leader. Medieval sources suggest Senkan disapproved of using religious debates for political gain, aligning with his reserved and scholarly nature.

In 970, Senkan received the three advanced esoteric initiations from Gyoyo. Although he maintained a good understanding of esoteric practices, he dedicated himself to promoting Pure Land teachings as his main focus. He composed the Jūgan hosshinki 十願發心記 (Ten Vows Arousing the Aspiration for Enlightenment), which according to Robert Rhodes is "the most extensive work on the Pure Land faith composed by a Tendai monk before Genshin".

Senkan's emphasis on meditations involving visualizing the setting sun and other Pure Land practices marked his evolving spiritual focus. He encouraged the formation of nenbutsu (Buddhist invocation) practice groups and promoted the Hassei Jugan teachings, which became a core framework for Pure Land devotees.

Senkan also served as a spiritual advisor to members of the imperial court and nobility. Notably, he conducted ordination ceremonies for several high-ranking women, including Princess Shoshi and Fujiwara no Yuhime, reflecting his openness to instructing female practitioners. Despite his detachment from court politics, his guidance attracted support from aristocrats who valued his teachings.

After his death, Senkan was venerated as an incarnation of Kannon or Samantabhadra, and he became known as the "Smiling Buddha" or "Buddha Saint" (Butsuda Shonin) for his compassionate nature.

== Teaching ==
Senkan's Jūgan hosshinki outlines ten vows intended to guide individuals on the path to rebirth in Amida Buddha’s Pure Land, where they can continue bodhisattva practices to achieve buddhahood. This text reflects Senkan's effort to integrate Pure Land practice within the Tendai Buddhist framework by arguing that birth in the Pure Land offers the most effective means for pursuing the bodhisattva path. While Tendai Buddhism traditionally emphasizes the long and arduous path of bodhisattva practice as the means to attain buddhahood, Senkan was skeptical about ordinary beings' ability to succeed in this approach, particularly in the difficult conditions of the Latter Age (mappo). Consequently, he promoted seeking birth in the Pure Land as a practical alternative, believing that this environment would facilitate the pursuit of the bodhisattva path without the hindrances faced in the ordinary world.

Despite the Tendai school's assertion that all beings possess the buddha nature and are ultimately destined for buddhahood, Senkan acknowledged the significant obstacles that hinder this realization. He strongly criticized the Hossō school's doctrine of five lineages, which claimed certain beings were incapable of enlightenment. Drawing from texts like the Lotus Sutra and the Mahāparinirvāṇa Sūtra, Senkan emphasized that the ultimate truth is that all beings will eventually attain buddhahood. However, while everyone has this potential, achieving it requires arousing the bodhicitta (the aspiration to become a Buddha for the sake of all beings) and committing to a challenging multi life path. According to Senkan, few individuals can develop the deep compassion and wisdom needed to actualize the bodhisattva path in this life. Even the most dedicated monks and lay followers may struggle to effectively engage in bodhisattva conduct. Senkan thus advocated seeking birth in Amida Buddha's Pure Land as a means for ordinary beings to gain the conditions necessary to fulfill the path in a special spiritually supportive environment created by the Buddha just for this task.

In addressing lay practitioners' concerns about their capacity to follow the bodhisattva path, Senkan maintained that arousing bodhicitta was crucial, even if immediate fulfillment of the vows was not possible. He reassured followers that simply making these vows would eventually lead to enlightenment, even if realization occurred in a future lifetime. Senkan emphasized that all actions performed by those who have set forth the aspiration for enlightenment become causes for eventual awakening. By encouraging people to take this first step, Senkan sought to ensure that both monks and laypeople could engage in the bodhisattva path, regardless of their social circumstances.

Senkan emphasizes that birth in the Pure Land is crucial because novice bodhisattvas lack the insight into emptiness needed to effectively guide others. By first being born in the Pure Land, individuals can attain this insight and develop supernatural powers that enable them to return to the cycle of birth-and-death to assist suffering beings. Senkan's first vow in the Jūgan hosshinki reflects this understanding, where he commits to studying Buddhist teachings to distinguish between true and provisional doctrines. He also vows to engage in practices that purify his senses and cleanse him of past karma, following the Lotus samādhi practice. This purification allows one to perceive the Pure Land clearly and maintain a state of physical and mental peace when facing death, ensuring a serene departure from this life.

Senkan also addresses the importance of supporting others in their journey to the Pure Land. Drawing from Pure Land texts, he vows to reveal to others the hour of their death seven days in advance, enabling them to prepare through focused nenbutsu practice. He highlights the significance of encountering a good spiritual friend at the time of death, which can guide even those with deep attachments to achieve birth in the Pure Land. Furthermore, Senkan explores the concept of “ten moments of thought,” presenting interpretations that range from brief breath cycles to a focus on ten mental attitudes that cultivate virtues like compassion, patience, and respect. Drawing on Korean Buddhist interpretations, Senkan concludes that these qualities naturally arise in those who sincerely recite Amida Buddha's name, ensuring birth in the Pure Land when practiced with the correct mindset.

Senkan's Jūgan hosshinki outlines a series of ten vows dedicated to the salvation of all sentient beings, emphasizing birth in Amida's Pure Land as the foundational step towards enlightenment. While Senkan regarded Pure Land birth as crucial, he viewed it as only the beginning of his spiritual path. The subsequent nine vows reflect his commitment to extensive bodhisattva practices. For instance, in the second vow, Senkan pledges that after being born in the Pure Land, he will swiftly return to this world to guide beings with whom he has karmic ties—such as parents, friends, and patrons—and uphold the Dharma until Maitreya, the future Buddha, appears. Additionally, Senkan extends his compassionate efforts beyond familiar connections; in his third vow, he vows to travel throughout the universe, seeking instruction from any Buddha he encounters, so that others may benefit from these teachings.

In the fourth and fifth vows, Senkan pledges to restore the Dharma in worlds where Buddhas have died, preserving the Buddhist teachings until another Buddha arises. In the sixth and seventh vows, he addresses the physical suffering of beings by vowing to appear as a wealthy benefactor to provide food and water, as a physician to heal the sick, and as a peacemaker to calm the violence of soldiers. He also promises to descend into the realms of suffering to endure the pain of beings trapped in those states. Vows eight and nine focus on forging karmic bonds, where Senkan vows to rescue all beings he has encountered throughout his countless lifetimes, even those who have scorned him, by guiding them to his own Pure Land modeled after Amida's. He also commits to being an ever-present spiritual guide for those seeking enlightenment.

The final vow ties all his aspirations together with a remarkable declaration. Senkan pledges to die holding a copy of his ten vows, believing that this text will transform into a wish-fulfilling jewel in his future lives. This jewel would manifest treasures, medicines, and spiritual guidance for those in need, ensuring their path to liberation. Senkan's dedication to compassionate service reflects his belief that, despite the perceived decline of the Dharma in his era, the path to buddhahood remains open through birth in the Pure Land and committed bodhisattva practice. His vows demonstrate a profound integration of Pure Land teachings within the framework of traditional Tendai Buddhism.

== See also ==
- Genshin
- Ennin
- Hōnen
