= Jimon =

Jimon may refer to:

- Jimon (emblem), the emblem used to identify Japanese temples, 寺紋
- Jimon and Sanmon, a branch of the Tendai sect of Buddhism created in the 9th century, 天台宗 寺門派
