= Miidera (play) =

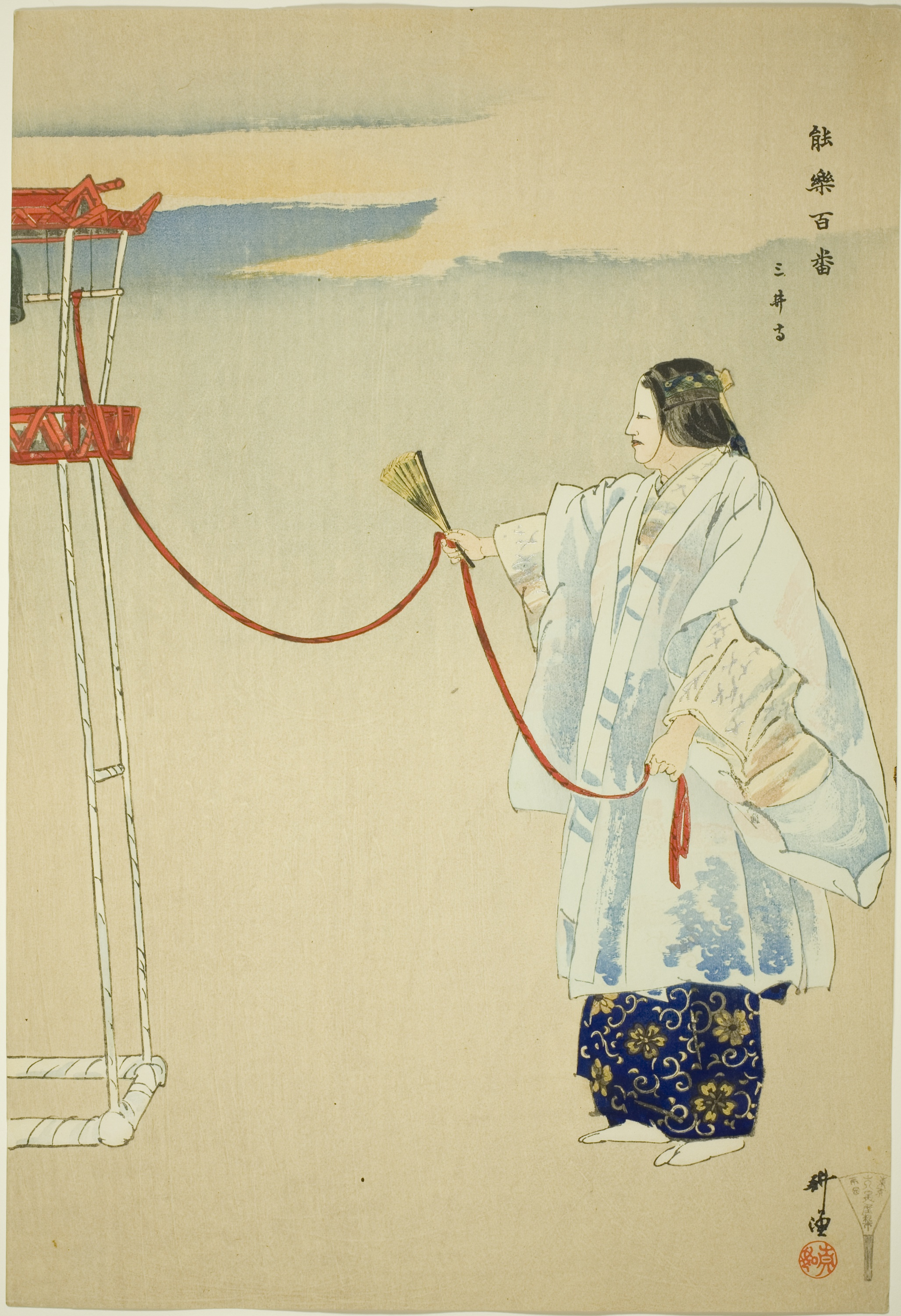
Miidera, from the series Nōgaku hyakuban, by Tsukioka Kōgyo; Art Institute of Chicago

Miidera was a Noh play centred around a mad woman, and her search for her son at the temple complex of Mii-dera near Kyoto.

== Plot ==
Driven mad by the loss of her young son, possibly abducted as a boy prostitute, the heroine is urged in a dream to seek him at Miidera temple. There the woman is much impressed by the temple bell, and recounts a long list of episodes involving temple bells.

When she finally draws attention to herself by striking the bell, she is recognised by and reunited with her son - the aesthete Oswald Valentine Sickert considering that "The sounding of the bell is the hinge of everything, a thing of great sentiment".

== Literary links ==
An early haiku quotes the play: "Hey there, wait a moment / before you strike the bell /at the cherry blossoms".

== See also ==
- Kagema
- Kannon
- Nāga
