= Ōjōyōshū =

Japanese Buddhist text composed in 985

The Ōjōyōshū (往生要集; The Essentials of Rebirth in the Pure Land) was an influential medieval Buddhist text composed in 985 by the Japanese Buddhist monk Genshin. The text is a comprehensive analysis of Buddhist practices related to rebirth in the Pure Land of Amida Buddha, drawing upon earlier Buddhist texts from China, and sutras such as the Contemplation Sutra. Genshin advocated a collection of mutually supportive practices, such as sutra recitation, centered around visual meditation of Amitabha Buddha where later Pure Land sects favored an approach that relied on exclusive recitation of the verbal nembutsu. The text is also well known for its graphic descriptions of the Hell realms, and sufferings one might endure for harmful acts committed in this life. Its influence can be seen in Japanese Buddhist paintings and other, later, texts. The founder of Jōdo Shinshū Buddhism, Shinran, wrote an influential commentary on the Ōjōyōshū titled, "Notes on Essentials of Rebirth", while Hōnen first encountered Pure Land teachings after studying Genshin's writings.

In 986, a copy was sent to China at Genshin's request and was reportedly deposited at Guoqingsi Temple on Mount Tiantai some time before 990.

== Contents ==
The Ōjōyōshū is written in eighty thousand Chinese characters, in kanbun prose, and is divided into ten chapters in three volumes. The Ōjōyōshū was intended as a comprehensive guide toward rebirth in the Pure Land of Amitabha Buddha in what Genshin believed was the declining age of the Dharma where the efficacy of the traditional Buddhist path toward buddhahood was no longer feasible. By gaining birth in the Pure Land, one could thus more readily undertake practices there. Each chapter starts with a short general introduction and then turns its attention towards details by quoting from Buddhist scriptures which are then commented on by Genshin. He uses 654 quotations and draws these from 160 different works. These quotations are used to resolve difficulties or enlarge upon certain subjects. In this endeavour, Genshin creates a coherent system of Pure Land belief and practice and indicates directions that later Pure Land movements concerned themselves with.

=== Chapter summaries ===
==== 1: Detestation of the Defiled Realms (厭離穢土) ====
Genshin presents the world of cyclic rebirth in samsara as profoundly unstable and pervaded by suffering, emphasizing the misery of the six realms of rebirth, with particular attention to hells, hungry ghosts, and animal existence. Human life itself is depicted as precarious, morally compromised, and dominated by aging, sickness, and death. The purpose of this chapter is not merely descriptive but soteriological: by cultivating revulsion toward samsāra, the practitioner is moved to seek liberation outside this defiled world. This negative appraisal of the present world functions as the indispensable psychological and doctrinal precondition for aspiring to birth in the Pure Land.

==== 2: Aspiration for the Pure Land (欣求淨土) ====
Here, Genshin turns to a detailed portrayal of Amitābha’s Pure Land as a realm of purity, bliss, and effortless progress toward Buddhahood. This chapter contrasts the instability of the present world with the security and spiritual advantages of Sukhāvatī, where conditions are perfectly suited for practice. The Pure Land is described as free from retrogression and moral danger, allowing beings to cultivate the bodhisattva path without obstruction. The aim of this chapter is to arouse confident longing for rebirth in the Pure Land.

==== 3: Scriptural Proofs for Pure Land Birth (證淨土) ====
In the third chapter, Genshin marshals canonical authority to demonstrate that rebirth in the Pure Land is firmly grounded in Buddhist scripture. Drawing on sutras and treatises, he shows that the Pure Land is an authentic destination affirmed by the Buddha’s teaching. These citations establish that ordinary beings, burdened by karmic limitations, can nonetheless attain rebirth through reliance on Amitābha. The chapter thus provides doctrinal scriptural legitimacy to the Pure Land Dharma.

==== 4: The Meaning and Classification of Nenbutsu (念佛正行) ====
This chapter constitutes the doctrinal core of the Ōjōyōshū. Genshin systematically analyzes the practice of nenbutsu, distinguishing multiple forms based on whether they are meditative or non-meditative and whether they involve visualization of definite characteristics. He explains that nenbutsu ranges from advanced contemplative practices grounded in Tendai meditation theory to the verbal recitation of Amitābha’s name. Although he regards contemplative forms as more refined, he maintains that all properly performed nenbutsu practices are effective causes for rebirth in Sukhavati. By interpreting nenbutsu primarily as a mode of mindfulness rather than mere verbal invocation, Genshin integrates Pure Land practice into the broader Tendai framework of meditation.

==== 5: Aids to Nenbutsu (助念方法) ====
This chapter addresses the practical conditions that support effective nenbutsu practice. Genshin argues that nenbutsu does not function in isolation but must be reinforced by a range of auxiliary disciplines. These include moral regulation, ritual preparation, mental focus, and devotional sincerity. Of particular importance is his concise enumeration of essential elements for Pure Land practice, such as the aspiration for enlightenment, disciplined conduct, deep faith, constancy, mindfulness of Amitābha, and the vow for rebirth. This chapter underscores that while nenbutsu is central, its efficacy depends on a holistic religious orientation.

Here, Genshin writes It is impossible to catch a fowl using a net consisting of one mesh. (Likewise, it is only by) employing myriad techniques to aid the contemplative mindfulness that the great matter of birth (in the Pure Land) is accomplished.

==== 6: Nenbutsu for Special Occasions (別時念佛) ====
This chapter discusses formalized and time-bound nenbutsu practices undertaken under specific circumstances. These include intensive meditation retreats drawn from Chinese Pure Land and Tiantai traditions, as well as practices performed at critical moments such as the time of death. Among these, the deathbed nenbutsu receives special emphasis, reflecting its prominence in Pure Land scripture. Genshin recommends recitation as particularly suitable in this context, given the physical and mental limitations of the dying person. The chapter highlights how nenbutsu can be adapted to varying capacities and situations while remaining oriented toward the same salvific goal.

==== 7: Benefits of Nenbutsu (念佛利益) ====
In this chapter, Genshin enumerates the concrete results that arise from practicing nenbutsu. These benefits include the purification of past wrongdoing, the accumulation of wholesome karma, protection by buddhas and benevolent forces, visionary experiences, and eventual liberation from lower realms. Nenbutsu is also presented as a direct cause of rebirth in the Pure Land and, ultimately, buddhahood. The chapter functions apologetically by demonstrating that nenbutsu produces tangible and cumulative effects, thereby reinforcing confidence in the practice.

==== 8: Scriptural Proofs of Nenbutsu’s Efficacy (念佛證據) ====
This brief chapter reinforces earlier claims by presenting textual evidence that nenbutsu reliably leads to rebirth in the Pure Land. Genshin cites authoritative passages to confirm that the causal connection between nenbutsu and rebirth is affirmed within the Buddhist canon. The chapter serves to dispel doubt by showing that nenbutsu is not merely one practice among others but one whose efficacy is explicitly endorsed by scripture.

==== 9: Other Practices for Pure Land Birth (諸行往生) ====
While emphasizing nenbutsu throughout the work, Genshin acknowledges in this chapter that rebirth in the Pure Land can also be attained through alternative Buddhist practices. Acts such as ethical conduct, merit-making, and other forms of devotion are recognized as valid causes of rebirth when oriented toward Amitābha. This inclusive stance reflects Genshin’s broader Tendai outlook and prevents the Pure Land path from being reduced to a single exclusive method. Nenbutsu remains primary, but it is not presented as the sole avenue to birth in the Pure Land.

==== 10: Resolution of Doctrinal Questions (問答料簡) ====
The final chapter addresses conceptual and doctrinal difficulties that might arise concerning Pure Land belief and practice. Through a series of structured discussions, Genshin clarifies apparent contradictions, reconciles Pure Land teachings with broader Mahāyāna doctrine, and resolves potential objections. This chapter completes the work by demonstrating that Pure Land Buddhism is not only emotionally compelling and practically accessible but also intellectually coherent. Together with the preceding chapters, it establishes the Ōjōyōshū as a comprehensive guide to liberation through rebirth in Amitābha’s Pure Land, suited to the spiritual conditions of the Latter Age.

=== Described Practices ===
==== Nenbutsu veneration ====
In this description, Genshin sets out to define the correct and orthodox nenbutsu. He instructs those who want to practice Pure Land salvation to: "Take Refuge in Him single-mindedly. Throw yourself, knees, arms and forehead, to the ground and venerate Amida Buddha far off in the West. Consider not the more or less of your practice; just be of sincere heart." In the second step, the nenbutsu-praise, Genshin urges the practitioner to sing hymns of Amida and praising the attributes of Amida. Next he instructs to "arouse the thought of bodhi". This means to perceive one's possibility of enlightenment and Buddhahood. It marks the moment of true conversion for a Buddhist. Converting the Buddhist realises the potential the possibility of all sentient being's rebirth in the Pure Land.

== Intention ==
Through his work Genshin intended to show a way of salvation within the time of declining dharma (mappō 末法) for all. He is concerned with Pure Land salvation exclusively which is within the capabilities of all beings. The most effective practice being nenbutsu.

== See also ==
- Ōjō
