= Enchin =

Japanese Buddhist monk (814–891)

Enchin (円珍) (814–891) was a Japanese Buddhist monk, founder of the Jimon school of Tendai Buddhism and Chief Abbot of Mii-dera at the foot of Mount Hiei. After succeeding to the post of Tendai zasu (座主; "Head of the Tendai Order"), in 873, a strong rivalry developed between his followers and those of Ennin's at Enryaku-ji (note: Ennin had died in 864).

The rivalry was largely geographical, and was not based much on sectarian differences over interpretations of practice or doctrine; nevertheless, the friction between the followers of the two zasu finally broke out into a violent conflict. Rivalries between the followers of different zasu were not anything new at the time.

During his twelve years on Mount Hiei, Enchin witnessed a conflict between direct disciples of Saichō (namely Enchō and Kōshō) and the disciples of his own master, the second Tendai zasu Gishin. After the death of Gishin, his main follower, Enshu, was elected as the third zasu, but Enchō and Kōshō objected and finally forced Enshu and his followers to leave Mount Hiei.

Most significantly, Enchin united the Tendai school's teachings with those of Chinese Esoteric Buddhism, and interpreted the Lotus Sutra from the point of view of esoteric teachings and used Tendai terminology in order to explain the esoteric Mahavairocana Tantra.

Enchin is said to have supported the worship of kami as well as certain elements of Confucianism. In a memorial speech in 887, he noted the respect the court of Tang China had for Japan due to the latter's support for the ideals of li (Chinese: 禮) and yi (Chinese: 義). He warned that although Enryaku-ji was founded with the kami in mind, "no such officiating monks are provided for the main deities of the mountain. This is certainly a breach of Li. There ought to be two monks to worship the two gods."
