= Jimon and Sanmon =

Rival branches of Tendai Buddhism

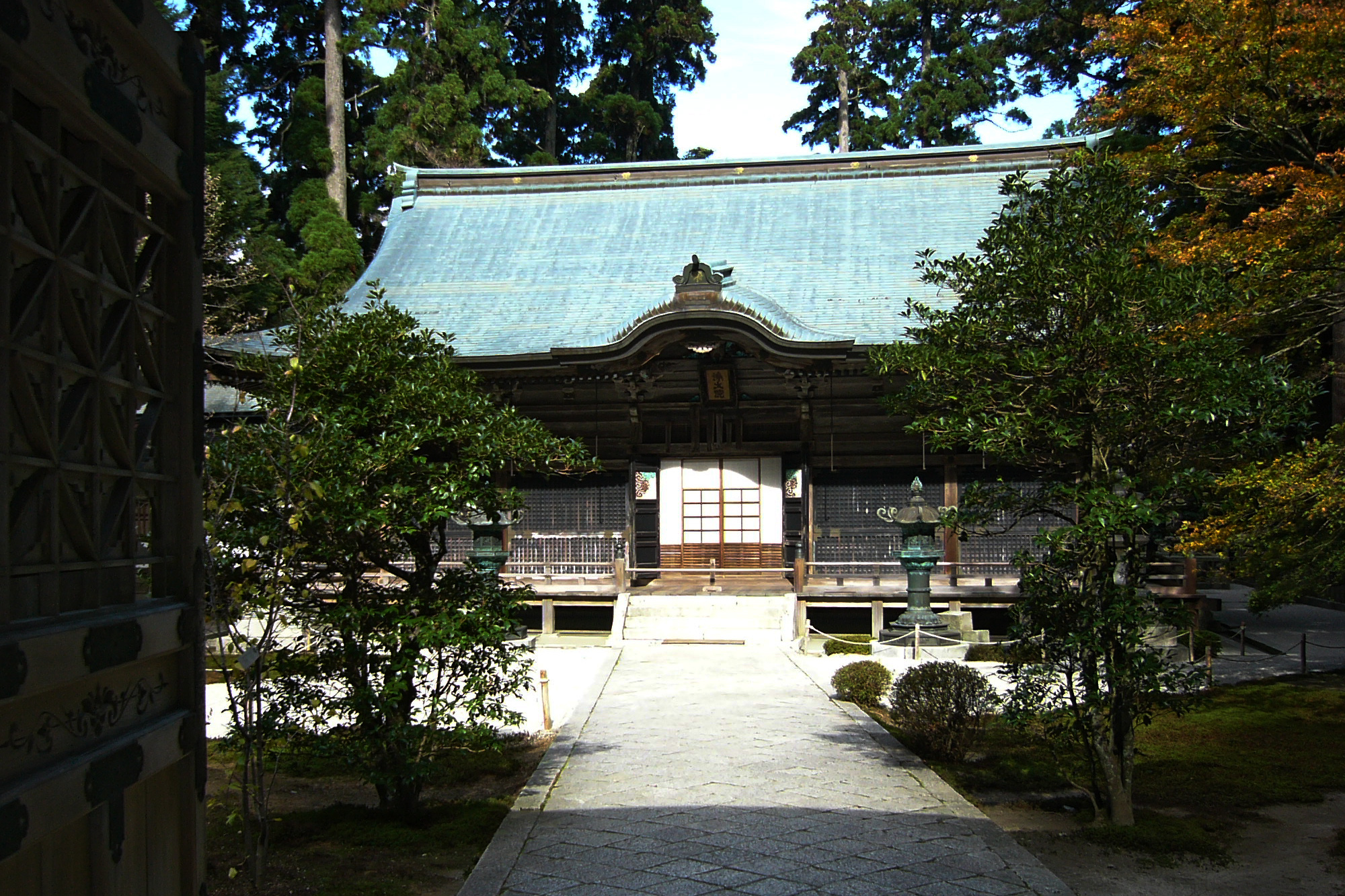
The "Pure Land Hall" (延暦寺浄土院) at Enryaku-ji on Mount Hiei.

Jimon (寺門) and Sanmon (山門), also known as the Enchin and Ennin factions, respectively, were rival branches of the Tendai sect of Buddhism created in the 9th century and based on Mount Hiei just outside Kyoto. Jimon's head temple was Mii-dera, at the foot of Mount Hiei, while the Sanmon sect was based at Enryaku-ji, at the summit of the mountain.

The origins of the schism began with a rivalry between the lineages of two disciples of the founder of Tendai Buddhism, Saicho, named Ennin and Enchin, over who would be the zasu (座主; "abbot") of Enryaku-ji temple, rather than based on differing opinions on dogma or doctrine. Following the deaths of Enchin in 891, this rivalry only deepened, and by 923 the 18th abbot, Ryōgen, further enflamed this rivalry, as he sought to solidify the Ennin lineage's hold not just on Enryaku-ji, but as the sole representatives of the Tendai sect at the Imperial court. For example, in the Ōwa Debate of 963, the Tendai side of the debate included Ryōgen and his close associates in the same lineage, despite more qualified and eminent monks from the Tendai sect being available. Subsequent conflicts were often the result of a monk from one faction becoming appointed Abbot (zasu) of the other faction's temple, or of one faction not being invited to events, conferences, or festivals held by the other. For example, in 981, the Imperial court appointed one Yokei (Enchin lineage) as abbot of Hosshō-ji temple, which led to a protest by the Ennin lineage. 160 monks of Ennin's lineage marched on the Chancellor's mansion threatening violence if the appointment was not rescinded.

In 993, fighting broke out between the factions. Monks of the Enchin lineage were driven out of Enryaku-ji and moved down the mountain to Mii-dera forming the jimon (寺門; "Temple Gate") faction, while the monks of the Ennin lineage who remained at Enryaku-ji formed the sanmon (山門; "Mountain Gate") faction. Along with other major temples in the capital, both sects formed the first standing armies of warrior monks, called sōhei. When the Genpei War broke out in 1180, the warrior monks of the two sects found themselves on opposing sides, the Enryaku-ji Sanmon monks supporting the Taira clan while Mii-dera's Jimon monks supported the Minamoto clan.

Only after the end of the Genpei War and the establishment of the Kamakura shogunate did the conflicts between the two sects settle down. However, the division and disagreement lasted several centuries longer, until both temples were destroyed by the forces of Oda Nobunaga at the end of the 16th century. Though it is unclear when the names Jimon and Sanmon fell out of use, and when the two temples ceased fighting, the destruction of both temples by a greater, larger outside force brought a definite end to their quarrels.
