= Ennin =

9th century Japanese monk known for travels in China

Ennin (圓仁)
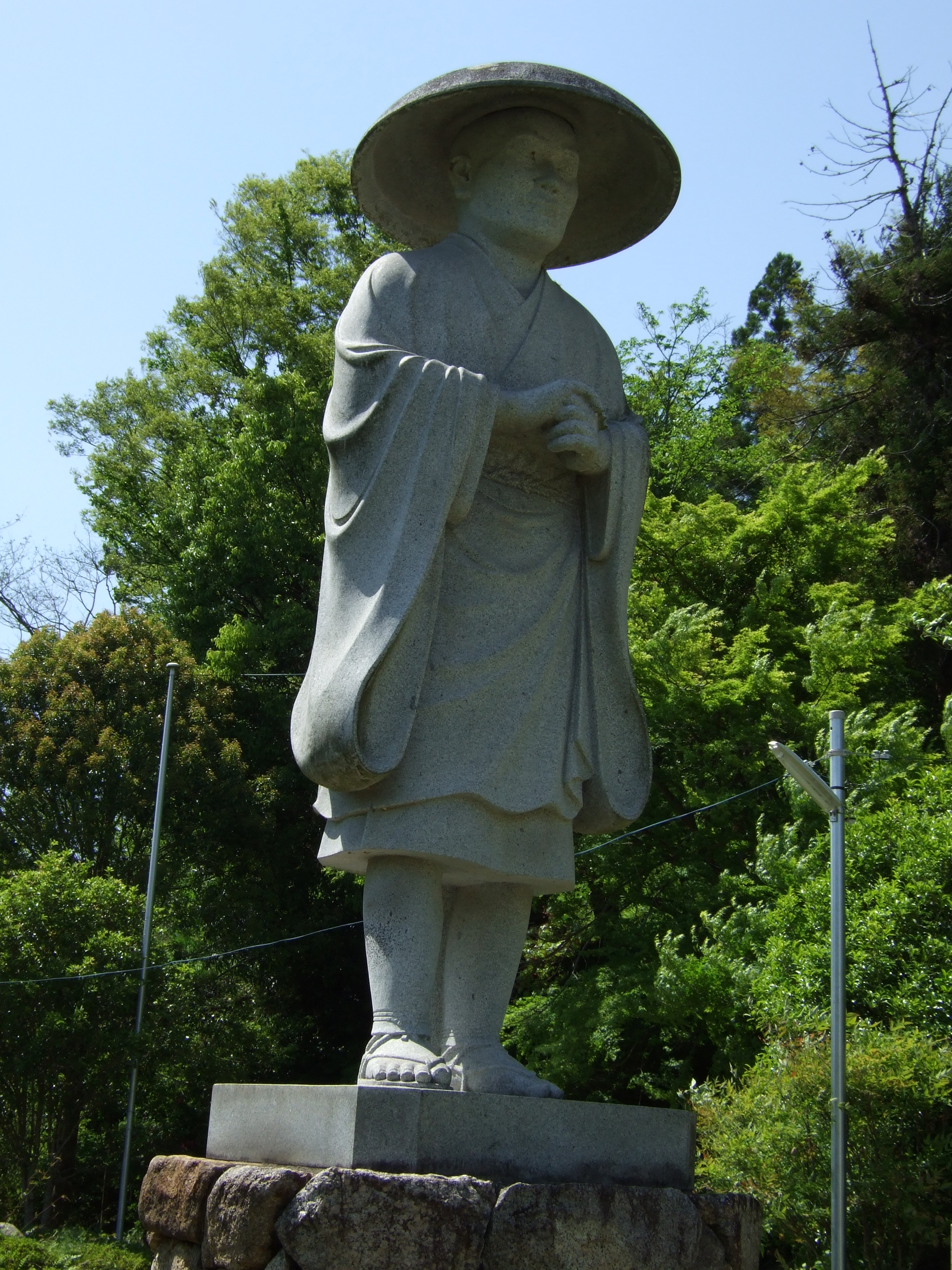
- A statue of Ennin.
- Title: Third zasu, head of the Tendai Order

Personal life
- Born: 793 or 794 CE Mibu, Tochigi Prefecture, Japan
- Died: February 24, 864 (aged 69–70)
- Other name: Jikaku Daishi (慈覺大師)

Religious life
- Religion: Buddhism
- School: Tendai school
- Lineage: Sammon lineage

Senior posting
- Predecessor: Enchō (円澄)
- Successor: An'e (安慧)

Ennin (圓仁 or 円仁; 793 CE or 794 CE – 864 CE), better known in Japan by his posthumous name, Jikaku Daishi (慈覺大師), was a priest of the Tendai school of Buddhism in Japan, and its third Zasu (座主; "Head of the Tendai Order").

Ennin was instrumental in expanding the Tendai Order's influence, and bringing back crucial training and resources from China, particularly esoteric Buddhist training and Pure Land teachings. He is most well known for integrating esoteric practices (Taimitsu) with the teachings of the Lotus Sutra. His journey to Tang China (838–847) and his subsequent writings profoundly influenced Japanese Buddhism.

== Life ==
=== Birth and origin ===
He was born into the Mibu (壬生) family in Shimotsuke Province (present-day Tochigi Prefecture), Japan and entered the Buddhist priesthood at Enryaku-ji on Mt. Hiei (Hieizan) near Kyoto at the age of 15. Studying under Saichō, the founder of Japanese Tendai Buddhism, Ennin excelled in his studies, particularly in the Lotus Sutra and Tiantai meditation practices. After Saichō’s death, Ennin sought to deepen his understanding of Buddhism by traveling to Tang China.

=== Trip to China ===
In 838, Ennin was in the party which accompanied Fujiwara no Tsunetsugu's diplomatic mission to the Tang dynasty Imperial court. The trip to China marked the beginning of a set of tribulations and adventures which he documented in his journal. The journal describes an account of the workings of the government of China, which saw strong and able administrative control of the state and its provinces, even at a time of a supposed decline of the Tang dynasty. His writings also expanded on religious matters and commerce. He stayed in Xi'an for five years.

Initially, he studied under two masters and then spent some time at Wutaishan (五臺山; Japanese: Godaisan), a mountain range famous for its numerous Buddhist temples in Shanxi Province in China. Here, he learned go-e nembutsu (五会念仏; "Five tone nembutsu") among other practices. Later he went to Chang'an (Japanese: Chōan), then the capital of China, where he was ordained into both mandala rituals: the Mahāvairocana-sūtra and the Vajraśekhara-sūtra, along with initiation and training in the Susiddhikara Sūtra tantra. He also wrote of his travels by ship while sailing along the Grand Canal of China.

Ennin was in China when the anti-Buddhist Emperor Wuzong of Tang took the throne in 840, and he lived through the Great Anti-Buddhist Persecution of 842–846. As a result of the persecution, he was deported from China, returning to Japan in 847.

=== Return to Japan ===
Upon returning to Japan in 847, Ennin brought back numerous Buddhist texts, maṇḍalas, and ritual implements. In 854, he became the third abbot of the Tendai sect at Enryaku-ji, where he built buildings to store the sutras and religious instruments he brought back from China. He played a pivotal role in the esotericization of Tendai Buddhism, reconciling the Lotus Sutra’s teachings with the practices of Chinese Esoteric Buddhism.

Ennin introduced numerous rituals which became central to Tendai practice such as the Lotus Repentance Rite (Hokke Senbō). He had a significant influence on Tendai Pure Land practice due to his introduction of two Pure Land rites that became central to the tradition's exoteric praxis: the “constantly walking” meditation on Amida (J: jōgyō zammai) and the "continuous nembutsu" chant (fudan nembutsu). While his chief contribution is seen as the strengthening of Tendai esotericism, the Pure Land recitation practices that he introduced also helped to lay a foundation for the independent Pure Land movements of the subsequent Kamakura period (1185–1333).

Ennin also established Sōji-in, a center for esoteric rituals, and built the Prabhūtaratna Stūpa to enshrine the Lotus Sutra. Ennin also founded the temple of Ryushakuji at Yamadera. His dedication to expanding the monastic complex and its courses of study assured the Tendai school a unique prominence in Japan.

Ennin's efforts laid the foundation for Taimitsu (Tendai Esotericism), which was further developed by later monks like Enchin and Annen. In 866, Emperor Seiwa posthumously awarded him the title Jikaku Daishi, recognizing his contributions to Japanese Buddhism. Ennin's synthesis of exoteric and esoteric teachings, along with his emphasis on the Lotus Sutra, solidified Tendai Buddhism's influence in Japan. His writings and rituals continue to be studied and practiced, making him one of the most important figures in Japanese Buddhist history.

== Works ==
Ennin was a prolific writer, producing over one hundred works. Some of his most important works are two commentaries on the Vajraśekhara Sūtra and Susiddhikara Sūtra.

His diary of travels in China, Nittō Guhō Junrei Kōki (入唐求法巡礼行記), was translated into English by Professor Edwin O. Reischauer under the title Ennin's Diary: The Record of a Pilgrimage to China in Search of the Law. Sometimes ranked among the best travelogues in world literature, it is a key source of information on life in Tang China and Silla Korea and offers a rare glimpse of the Silla personality Chang Pogo.

== Contributions ==
=== Taimitsu ===
Letter A in Siddham script

Ennin played a crucial role in developing the Esoteric Buddhist tradition within Japanese Tendai Buddhism, known as Taimitsu (台密). Drawing from his experiences studying in Tang China, Ennin sought to expand and refine the Esoteric teachings that Saichō had introduced but left incomplete. Central to Ennin's Esoteric metaphysics was his theory that the syllable "A", as the foundational vowel in the Sanskrit alphabet, represented the ultimate reality that is unborn and undying. This reality is equated with the inner enlightenment of the cosmic Buddha Mahāvairocana (Jp. Dainichi, 大日), the central figure in East Asian Esoteric Buddhism.

Ennin identified the syllable "A" as the scriptural essence of key Esoteric texts such as the Vajraśekhara-sūtra and the Mahāvairocana-sūtra. In his commentary on the Vajraśekhara-sūtra, he declared that the syllable "A" unified the sutra's diverse meanings. Citing the Mahāvairocana, Ennin maintained that the Esoteric teachings in their entirety are encapsulated by the syllable "A." He asserted that this syllable is the source of all phenomena, and in response to differing conditions, it manifests either as the enlightened realm symbolized by Esoteric mandalas or as the realm of delusion experienced by ordinary beings. This framework echoes Saichō's doctrine of "Suchness according with conditions," in which ultimate reality manifests itself in response to changing circumstances.

Ennin further linked the "A" syllable to the differentiated expressions of truth symbolized by the various sounds and characters in Buddhist mantras. He claimed that the single syllable "A" expands into all syllables, reflecting the principle that Suchness manifests in accordance with conditions. In the question-and-answer section of his commentary, Ennin affirmed that the Buddha's enlightened realm—depicted in the vajra realm mandala—is established through the conditioned arising of the dharma-realm, which itself embodies dharma-nature. Here, Ennin emphasized that the syllable "A" manifests in accordance with conditions to produce the phenomenal world. He further maintained that this understanding aligned with the Tendai doctrine of the Buddha-nature of insentient beings (cf. Zhanran), reinforcing the idea that all things participate in the ultimate reality of Suchness according with conditions.

=== Pure Land Buddhism ===
Ennin is traditionally regarded as the figure who introduced Pure Land practices into the Tendai tradition. While Saichō himself transmitted a wide range of continental Buddhist teachings, Pure Land devotion did not take root on Mount Hiei until Ennin’s leadership. According to the Jikaku Daishiden (Biography of Jikaku Daishi), compiled in the early tenth century, Ennin formally taught his disciples a form of nenbutsu samādhi in 851, drawing on practices he had encountered during his travels in China, particularly those associated with Mount Wutai. The same source records that Ennin initiated the constantly walking samādhi on Mount Hiei, a ritual involving continuous circumambulation and recitation focused on Amitābha Buddha. Although Ennin died in 864, the biography further reports that the first uninterrupted nenbutsu ritual (fudan nenbutsu) on Mount Hiei was carried out the following year, explicitly described as fulfilling Ennin’s expressed intentions.

Scholars have emphasized that the adoption of Pure Land elements within Tendai was facilitated by the doctrinal structure of the constantly walking samādhi, in which Amitābha serves as the central object of devotion. Over time, this practice became institutionalized on Mount Hiei, with dedicated halls constructed in each of the three major precincts of Enryakuji. However, modern research, notably by Sonoda Kōyū, has argued that the form of constantly walking samādhi promoted by Ennin diverged from the classical description found in the Mohe zhiguan. Sonoda proposed that Ennin’s practice was closely related to the “five tones nenbutsu,” a musically structured form of Amitābha recitation developed in Tang China by the monk Fazhao and associated with Mount Wutai. While later Tendai sources claim that Ennin studied this musical nenbutsu during his stay on Mount Wutai and transmitted it to Japan, Ennin’s own travel diary does not explicitly confirm such instruction. Sonoda therefore suggested that Ennin may instead have encountered the practice indirectly in Chang’an through lectures delivered by Jingshuang, a disciple of Fazhao, at temples where Ennin resided. Due to gaps in Ennin’s diary and the absence of direct testimony, the precise circumstances under which Ennin learned these nenbutsu practices remain uncertain. Nevertheless, his role in establishing Amitābha-centered ritual and devotion within the Tendai school marks a decisive stage in the early integration of Pure Land Buddhism into Japanese monastic life.

The Jikaku Daishiden also describes Ennin's deathbed rites as being focused on birth in the Pure Land as follows:

Ennin requested his disciples to (help him) shave his head, to put on a purerobe, and to burn incense. Then he joined the palms of his hands togethertoward the western direction and had Enchō 圓澄 recite, “I take refuge in and venerate Amida, who possesses the knowledge of all modes of existence (Kimyōchōrai Midashugaku 歸命頂禮彌陀種覺).” Also Ennin had his disciples re-cite the names of various buddhas and bodhisattvas a hundred times in the order of Mahāvairocana Buddha, Śākyamuni Buddha, Amida Buddha, the bo-dhisattva Samantabhadra, the bodhisattva Mañjuśrī, the bodhisattva Kan-non, and the bodhisattva Maitreya.

== See also ==
- Enchin

== Sources ==
- Edwin O. Reischauer, Ennin's Diary: The Record of a Pilgrimage to China in Search of the Law (New York: Ronald Press, 1955).
- Edwin O. Reischauer, Ennin's Travels in T'ang China (New York: Ronald Press, 1955).
