= Paul Collins (artist) =

American painter

Paul Lamar Collins (born December 11, 1934) is an American realist painter. Collins is known for his skillful use of textures, light, and attention to detail.

== Career ==
Collins' art grew out of his study, long experimentation, and determination. He was born in Muskegon, Michigan and moved to Grand Rapids at a very young age. Paul went to school in Ada and Grand Rapids, Michigan. He was discouraged from taking art seriously because of its seemingly "impractical" potential as a future career.

Collins spent his youth growing up in a predominantly black neighborhood. He found encouragement and influence from Randy Brown, a highly educated artist and poet who came from the south, persuaded him to pursue a career in art. Brown's studio was near Collins’ home, and while Paul was still in school he often visited it. About this time he first tried painting in oils, a medium he now prefers most. His interest in the oil medium led him to absorb all he could read about the techniques and chemistry of paints. He tried watercolors and tempera and even experimented briefly with acrylics. Oil and pencil, however, remain the foundation of his technique.

After Collins graduated from high school, he and Brown started a business called Ran-Col. Their general design studio gave Collins an opportunity to develop his talent for design, layout and lettering. Large scale super-graphics were a specialty of the studio. This allowed Paul to keep his technical skills sharp.

Around this time, Collins began to sell his paintings at art fairs. He was always disturbed by the stereotypical way blacks were usually portrayed with oversized lips and eyes popping out that he chose to paint large pieces depicting black faces. He soon launched a two-year sojourn to West Africa to paint a cultural series depicting a part of his ancestry.

=== 20th century ===
In 1969, Collins traveled to West Africa with his eldest son Michael, where Paul studied and portrayed the Senegalese and Gambian people in their native environment. The resulting series entitled, "Black Portrait of an African Journey" was exhibited throughout Africa, Europe and the United States. The series was well received by critics. As the Detroit Free Press noted, "The immediate result of the African trip was the establishment of Collins’ name as a potent new view visual commentator on the human condition." Many of the paintings were featured in the movie titled "Save the Children" released by Paramount in 1972. The Senegalese government named a street, Rue Monsieur Paul Collins, in his honor.

A few years later while at the United Nations conference with Unicef in New York he was invited by Chief Fools Crow from the Pine Ridge Reservation to come and live with them and portray another part of his ancestry. So in 1972, Collins relocated to the Rosebud and Pine Ridge Indian reservations of South Dakota to document the current state of the American Indian. The thirty painting series "Other voices- A Native American Tableau" opened in New York and exhibited Paris.

During this time Collins found himself acting as a diplomatic liaison between the Sioux Indians and the United States government. With the help of Michigan representative, and friend, Guy Vanderjagt, the Sioux and other tribes honored Collins by making him a full brother, naming him: "Bright Eagle". Collins wrote and illustrated an article about the experiences in Ebony Magazine, June 1973.

In 1975, Collins was commissioned to create an 18 x 8 ft. mural of Grand Rapids native, President Gerald R. Ford. The mural is exhibited at the Gerald R. Ford International Airport, and reveals various facets of Ford's personal life as a President of the United States; an athlete, a father, and a husband. The mural attracted national attention and received critical acclaim for its "strong and dignified presentation of Gerald R. Ford". The mural and individual images are published in the book, Gerald R. Ford- A Man in Perspective, (Eerdmans, 1976).

In 1981, Collins’ created the "Ford Museum Commemorative Poster" in honor of the opening of the Gerald R. Ford Presidential Museum in Grand Rapids, Michigan.

For Anheuser-Busch's 10th Anniversary celebration, Collins was a contributor to the company's "Great Kings of Africa". Collins "Shaka, King of Zulus", completed in 1976, was one of the first four portraits commissioned for the series highlighting the historical contributions of great African leaders. Collins was featured in a Budweiser TV commercial commemorating the original airing of "Roots".

One year later, Collins premiered "The Special Olympics Collection" at the John F. Kennedy Center for the Performing Arts in Washington, D.C. The eight-piece series remains at the center where it is on permanent exhibit. Collins spent almost three years attending international games, sketching children, assisting the coaches and participating in the medal awards ceremonies. The collection was created to find new ways to raise funds because the previous efforts were no longer sufficient.

"Great Beautiful Black Women", a record of the journey of black women from their African origins to the present day, premiered at the Chicago Cultural Center in 1978. The Chicago unveiling was witnessed by driving forces in cultural evolution such as Rosa Parks, Wilma Rudolph, and Coretta Scott King. The collection was originally scheduled to tour for two years, but its journey was extended to five years, again due to its immense popularity. It highlighted the roles of many black women who were involved in the Civil Rights Movement that changed the United States forever.

In 1979, Collins started an ever-growing collection of works entitled "Contributions to the History of the United States of America". The series showcases individuals who symbolize the struggle of human dignity and human rights such as Harriet Tubman, Frederick Douglass, Rosa Parks and Liberty and Justice, a mural symbolizing historical moments of the shaping of the United States. The painting depicting "Harriet Tubman’s Underground Railroad" has become a national icon. This image is used in history books, school books, children's books, and museums. Well over a million posters have been sold worldwide. Pieces of this collection are on permanent display at the Van Andel Museum and Gerald R. Ford Presidential Museum in Grand Rapids, Michigan and the Charles H. Wright Museum of African American History in Detroit, Michigan.

Moving on to portray ‘ordinary’ people engaged in ‘extra’-ordinary activities, Collins completed the "America at Work" series in 1983. It was first exhibited at the Great Hall of the United States Department of Labor in Washington, D.C. The popularity of this series continues to grow, as does the collection, with new pieces gradually being added. The collection is on permanent exhibit at the Amway Grand Plaza Hotel in Grand Rapids, Michigan.

In 1987, Collins’ travels took him to the Middle East. The result: "The Voices of Israel". The images shed light upon the unique mesh of cultures and religions that comprise the traditionally-rooted, yet newly forming identity of the nation. With no political or religious affiliations, Collins captures the people of Israel on their own terms. The twenty-five piece collection toured Israel and the United States under the auspices of the Anti-Defamation League of B'nai B'rith. During his two-year stay, Collins was commissioned to create a mural to celebrate the 40th anniversary of Israel by the Association for Promoting Tourism.

1989 marked Collins’ return to African soil to complete the series entitled "Kenya: In the Beginning" commissioned by the Bartek Corporation, capturing the individual qualities of the Turkana, Samburu, and Maasai tribes. The series of fifteen paintings were unveiled in Kenya and has been used in various fundraising venues. The collection hangs at the headquarters of Bartek Corporation in Ypsilanti, Michigan, and Spaulding for Children in Detroit, Michigan.

Collins then answered the call of the Pacific Rim, moving to Omihachiman, Japan in 1994, commissioned by Amway Japan Corporation. Through his immersion in Japanese culture, he created paintings that acted as a bridge of insight for the Western eye, offering a view into the customs, rituals, and harmony of the Japanese people. The collection was unveiled in 1997 at the Megaro Gajoun Museum in Tokyo, Japan and exhibited at the Kawara Museum in Omihachiman, Japan.

In 1998, Collins was honored by a request from the International Peace Center to represent the United States of America with a sixty piece retrospective entitled "Visions", to help reinitiate the annual International Arts Festival in Bosnia-Herzegovina. The theme of the event was "Healing" an effort to erase the scars of war. Opening night at the Collegium Artisticum drew an emotional group of people that had not seen each other since the war ended. During his stay, he served as a goodwill ambassador for the arts community and invited the artists of Banja Luka to rejoin the art program in Sarajevo.

=== 21st century ===
In 2000, he unveiled "Who is Key West?" a series of paintings that captures the flavor of a unique part of the United States. Collins knew that visitors came to enjoy the island and the unique personalities that shape the city of Key West, so he immortalizes these characters in a fourteen-piece series. The collection was exhibited at the Key West Museum of Art and History, voted Florida's best Museum 2007 – Florida Magazine, through 2014.

In 2004, the "Founders of a Dream Mural" was unveiled in Havana, Cuba at the Simon Bolivar Museum at the inauguration ceremonies of the International Arts Festival. His work from the "Embargo of the Angels" series was also on exhibit at the National Museum of Fine Arts of Havana.

Collins has also designed many distinguished awards and emblems. He is the creator of the Martin Luther King, Jr. Non-Violent Peace Prize Medal commissioned by Coretta Scott King for the centers highest honor. The award has been bestowed upon such leaders as Rosa Parks, Cesar Chavez, President Jimmy Carter and Desmond Tutu. He also designed the Challenger 7 Space Shuttle logo commemorating the first U.S. woman in space, and the Presidential Fitness Mural for the President Carter Administration.

His work has been viewed not only in galleries, from the Pushkin Museum in Moscow to the Kennedy Center in Washington, D.C., but also in various libraries, schools, gymnasiums, correctional institutes, community centers, and hospitals. He continues to lecture students, teaching children about other cultures through his art and life experiences. Collins has painted numerous murals on school walls and donated the reproduction rights to scholarship funds. Collins has received many awards for his efforts throughout the years, including the Mead Book Award, The Tadlow Fine Arts Award, The People's Choice Award in Paris, The Golden Centaur of Italy, and the Ceba Award for Excellence. He was marked as one of the top twenty painters in America by the Watson-Guptill Publication. He has also served on a number of executive boards for various organizations, including the Martin Luther King, Jr. Board in Atlanta and the Kennedy Center in Washington D.C.

He served as President of the Greater Grand Rapids Fund where he helped raise over $350,000 from various corporations to establish the "Teens Summer Jobs Program" creating over 600 summer jobs. Collins also co-chaired the Grand Rapids Youth Commonwealth Campaign with President Gerald R. Ford and Senator Glenn Steil in a campaign to restore the existing Seidman Youth Center and build an additional center across town.

== Exhibitions ==
World Wide:

Dakar, Senegal; Nairobi, Kenya; Jerusalem, Israel; Lagos, Nigeria; Sarajevo, Bosnia; Freeport, Grand Bahamas; Omihachiman, Japan; Tokyo, Japan; Paris, France; Moscow, Russia; Old Havana, Cuba; Tel Aviv, Israel

United States:

New York; Washington, DC; Ohio; Illinois; Indiana; Virginia, Michigan, Louisiana, Delaware, Massachusetts; Pennsylvania; Maryland; Florida; Georgia; Kentucky; California; Tennessee; Arizona; New Jersey; Minnesota; South Dakota; Vermont

== Publications ==
Books:

"Paths to Freedom" – National Geographic, "Passages to Freedom" – Smithsonian Institution Press, "The Paradox of Loyalty" – Third World Press, "African Americans You Need To Know", Heritage Pub., "Let Freedom Reign" Civil War – Capstone Press, "Alabama the River State", Cahaba Trace Commission, "Biographical Encyclopedia of American Painters", Dealers Choice, "Profiles of Key West", Alama Bond, "The History of the U.A.W.", "The History of the Amway", "Premio Centauro d’ Oro", Accademia Italia, Salsomaggione, "Men of Achievement", Cambridge, England, "Print World Dictionary of Contemporary Art", World Ink., "Literature & Language" Level 12, McDougal Littell Pub., "Literature & Language" Level 18, McDougal Littell Pub., "Compassionate Capitalism", Penguin Books New York, "Who’s Who Among Black Americans" Publishing Company, "Artists of Grand Rapids" J. Gray Sweeney – GR Art Museum, "20 Figure Painters & How They Work", Watson-Guptill, "A Time to Heal", Harper and Rowe Publishing, "Great Beautiful Black Women" Johnson Publishing, Chicago, "A Man In Prospective" Eerdmans Publishing, Grand Rapids, "Who’s Who in American Art", R.R. Bowker Pub., New York, "Other Voices – A Native American Tableau" N.A.E.C., "Black Portrait of an African Journey", Eerdmans Publishing, "A Trail to Bear Paw Mountain" Ballantine Historical Novels

Magazines:

Accent, American Artist Cause, Cause, Crisis, Dani, Ebony, Grand Rapids Magazine, Hijatus, International Special Olympic, Insight, Jet, Jewish Gazette, La Revue Moderne, Land & Life, Le Esha, Ma’ariv, Michigan History, National Geographic, Newsweek, Parent, Palette Talk, People, Scholastic News, Sol Y Son, Take Pride, Time, West Michigan Magazine

Film:

"Visions" a retrospective by Paul Collins- Sarajevo, Bosnia – Herzegovina, BBC; "Voices of Israel" Paul Collins- Sunday Morning Show, CBS; "Paul Collins in Israel"- Israeli Films Inc.; "Compassionate Capitalism"- Intaglio Productions; Interview – Paul Collins- The Larry King Show; "Save the Children"- Paramount Pictures; "Free of Eden"- Hallmark Films; "American History – Underground Railroad"- Traige Productions, History Channel; "Foundations of Courage – A Cry to Freedom"- BET; "Break Me My Bounds: - The Paul Laurence Dunbar Story"- Northern Light Production; "Kingpin"- NBC Studios; "Crossings"- Maryland Pub. Television; "Reginald F. Lewis Museum"- Baltimore, MD
