= Himure Hachiman-gū =

Shinto shrine in Omihachiman, Japan

Himure Hachiman-gū 日牟禮八幡宮
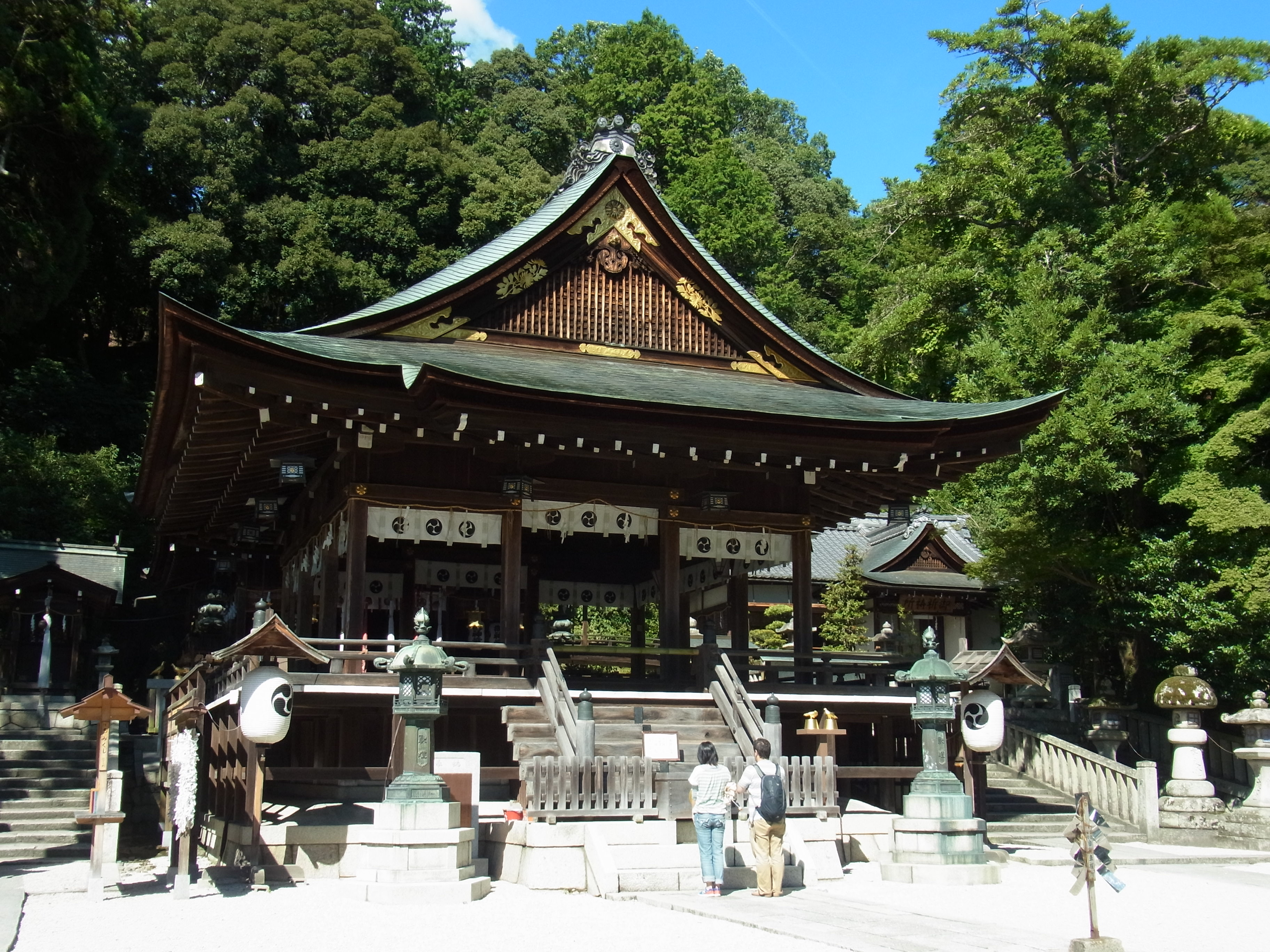
- Heiden of Himure Hachiman-gū

- Himure Hachiman-gū Himure Hachiman-gū (Japan)

Religion
- Affiliation: Shinto
- Deity: Emperor Ōjin, Empress Jingū, Hime-gami

Location
- Location: Ōmihachiman-shi, Shiga-ken
- Interactive map of Himure Hachiman-gū 日牟禮八幡宮
- Coordinates: 36°44′54.7″N 137°1′16.8″E

Architecture
- Founder: c. Takenouchi no Sukune
- Established: c.131AD

Website
- Official website

Himure Hachiman-gū (日牟禮八幡宮) is a Shinto shrine located in the city of Ōmihachiman, Shiga Prefecture, Japan. The city is named after this shrine, and it is located within the Omihachiman City Traditional Buildings Preservation Area. The shrine has two main festivals, the Sagichō Matsuri (左義長まつり) and the Hachiman Matsuri (八幡まつり) which are both designated National Intangible Folk Cultural Properties.

== History ==
The foundation of Himure Hachiman-gū is uncertain. According to the shine’s legend, it was founded in 131 AD when the semi-legendary Emperor Seimu ordered Takenouchi no Sukune to establish a shrine to “Oshima no Okami” at this location. However, “Ōshima no Ōkami” is identified with Ōkuninushi and thus this legend may be confused with that of the Ōshima Jinja Okitsushima Jinja (大嶋神社奥津嶋神社) which is located nearby. In 275 AD, Emperor Ōjin, visited Ōmi Province, and stayed at a temporary palace built at the location of the present shrine. During his visit, he witnessed a mysterious phenomenon in which two suns appeared in the sky at the same time. The phenomenon was considered to herald an auspicious event, and a shrine called “Himure-no-yashiro” was constructed on the site. Emperor Ōjin was later identified as the avatar of the kami Hachiman and therefore the shrine came to be called the "Himure Hachiman-gū".

In 911, Emperor Ichijō, constructed a shrine on the northern peak of Mount Hachiman located behind this shrine as a branch of the Usa-Hachiman-gū. This was called the "Upper shrine", or Kami-no-yashiro with the original shrine at the foot of the mountain referred to as the "Lower shrine", or Shimo-no-yashiro. In 1585, Toyotomi Hidetsugu merged the two shrines together and constructed Hachimanyama Castle on the site of the Kami-no-yashiro. Although the castle was soon abandoned after he was ordered to commit seppuku, the castle town which had developed around the castle and the lower shrine flourished as many merchants relocated to this area after the ruin of Oda Nobunaga's Azuchi Castle. These traveling merchants, known as Ōmi shōnin, traded widely throughout Japan, and even overseas, and adopted this shrine as their guardian deity. The Himure Hachiman-gū has a votive tablet depicting a trading vessel between Japan and Annam with prayers for a safe voyage which is a designated National Important Cultural Property.

In 1876, following the Meiji restoration and the establishment of the Modern system of ranked Shinto shrines under State Shinto, the shrine was officially designated a “village shrine”. It was promoted to the rank of “prefectural shrine” in 1916.

Then shrine is a 30-minute walk from Ōmi-Hachiman Station on then JR West Biwako Line.

== Gallery ==
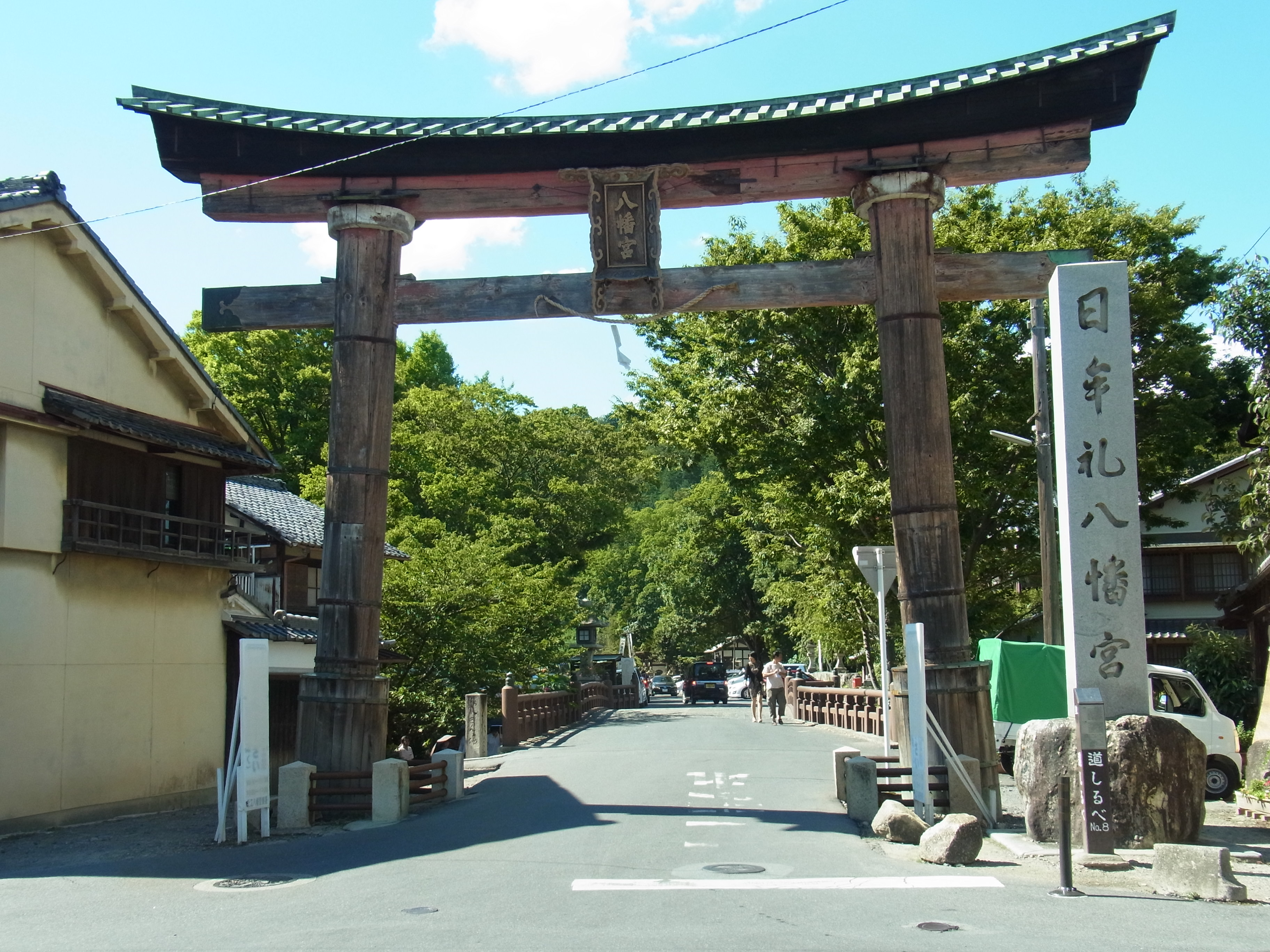
Heiden and precincts

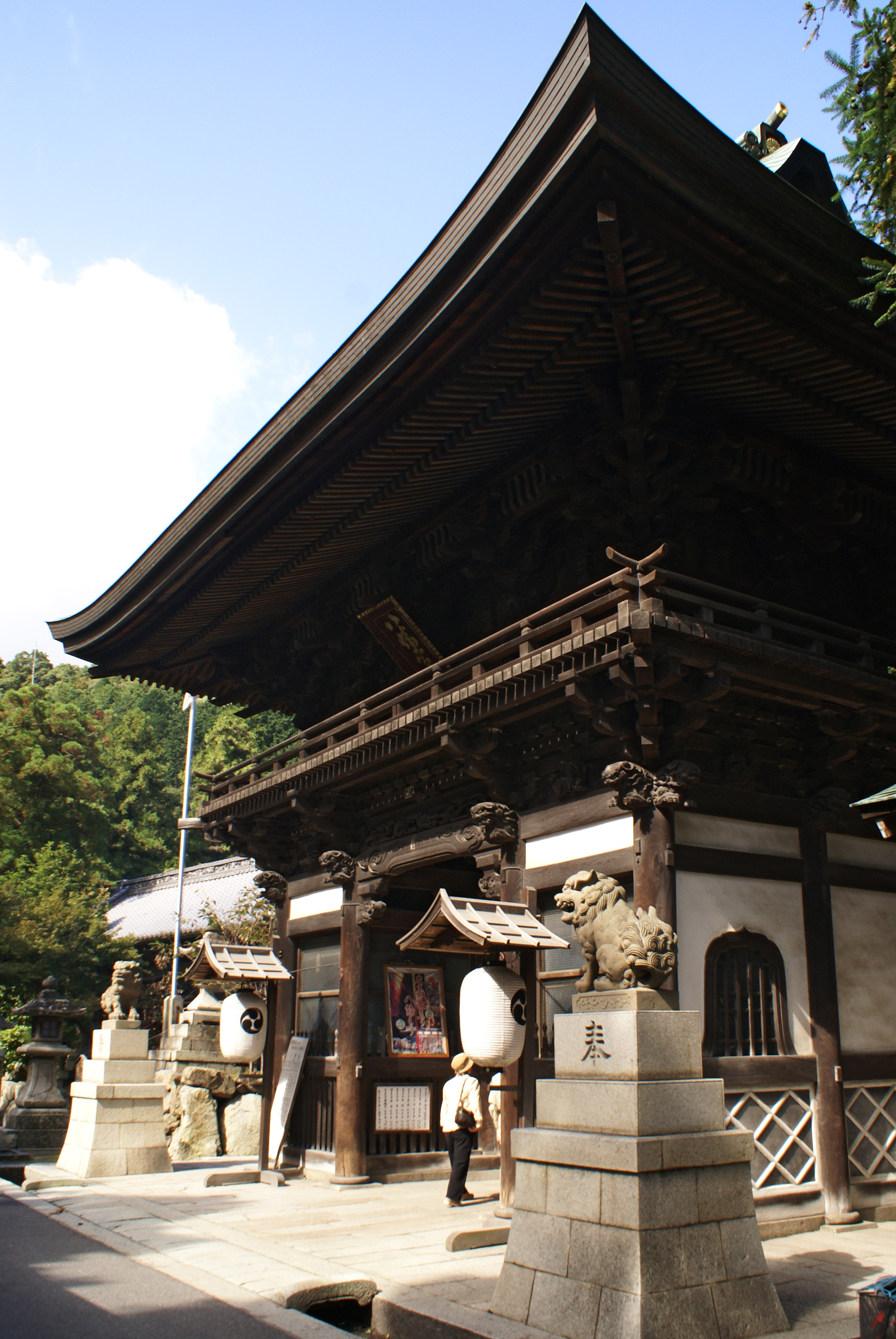
Romon

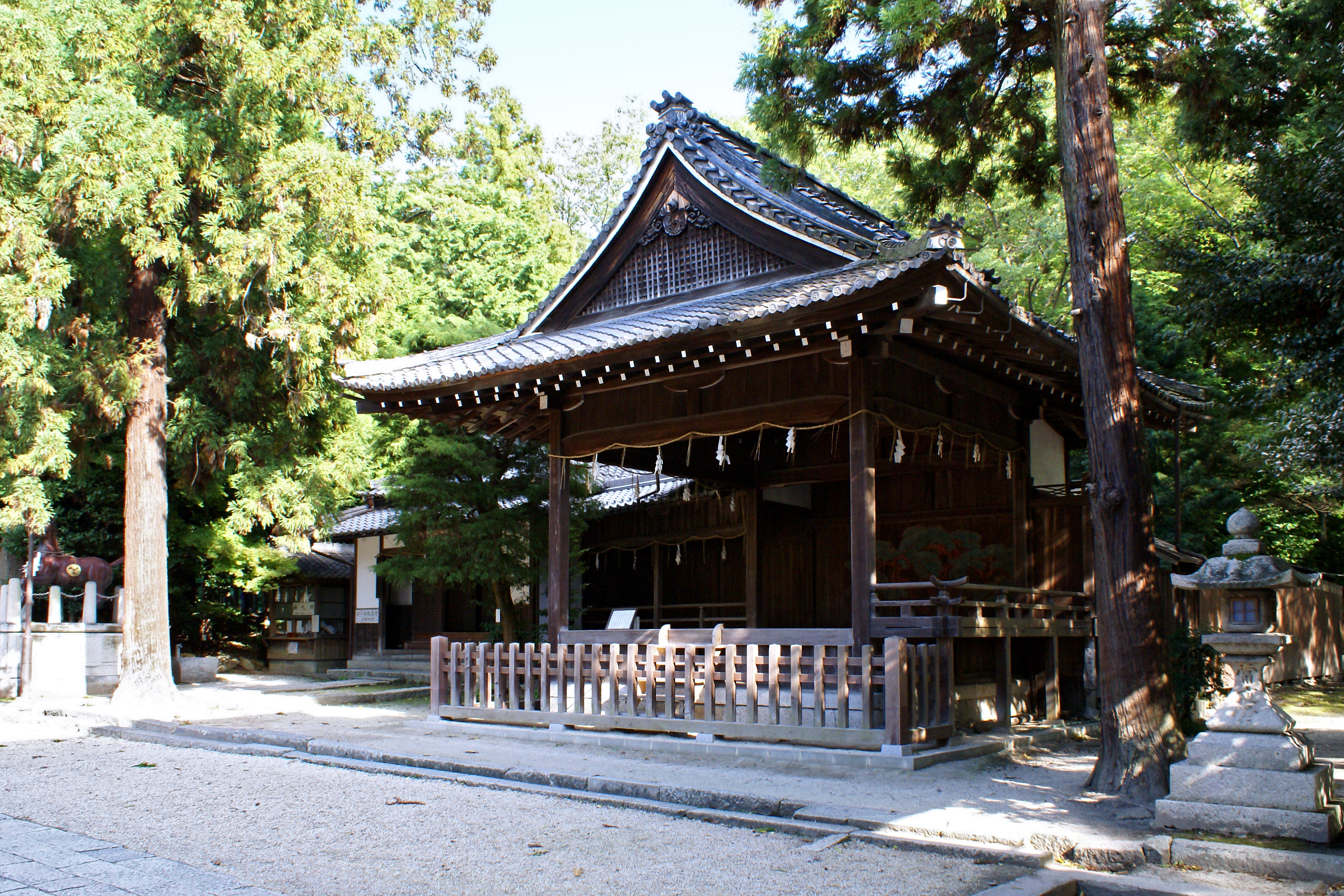
Noh Stage

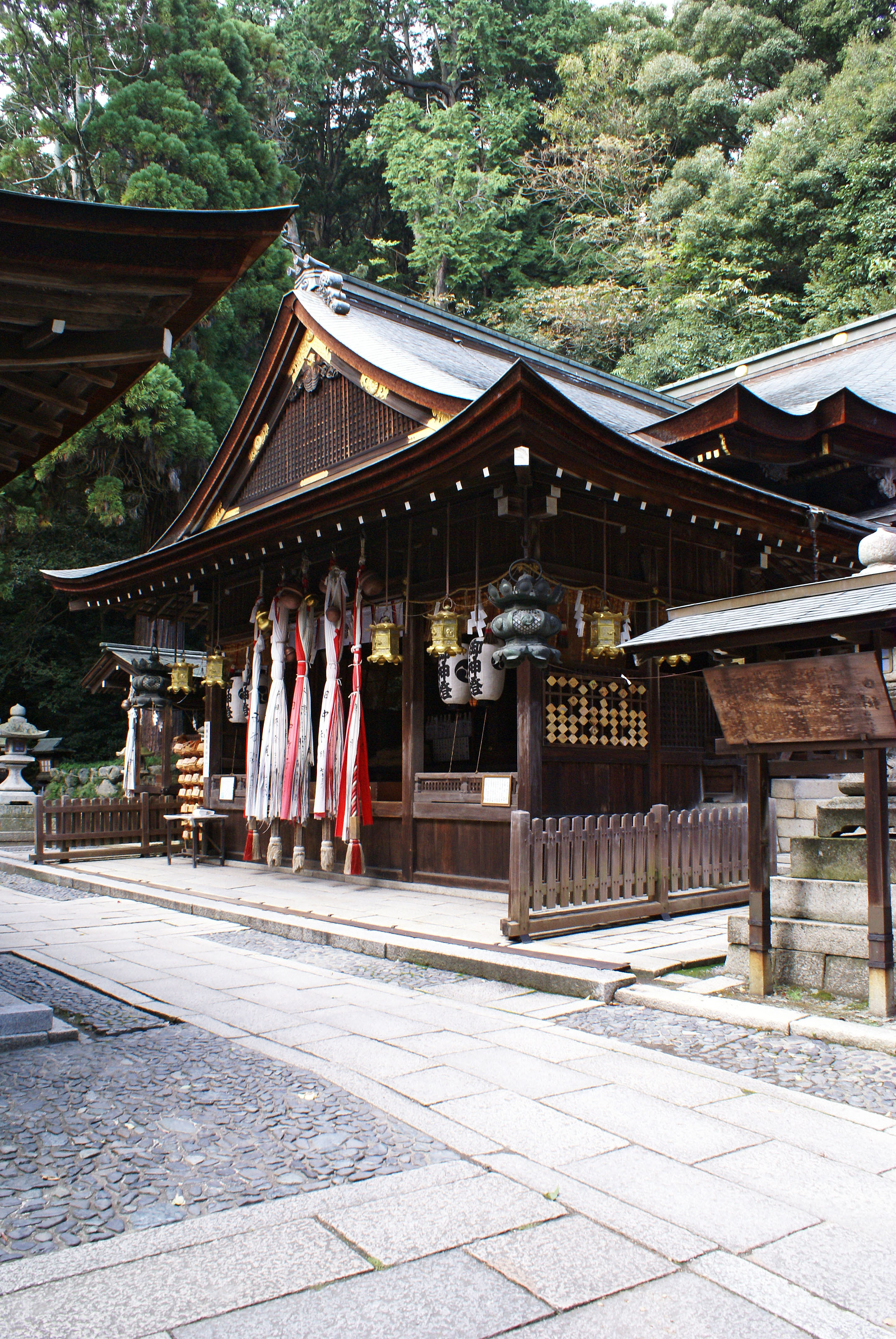
Honden

== See also ==
- List of Shinto shrines
