= Yukinoyama Kofun =

Burial mound in Kansai region of Japan

- 雪野山古墳 (Japanese)
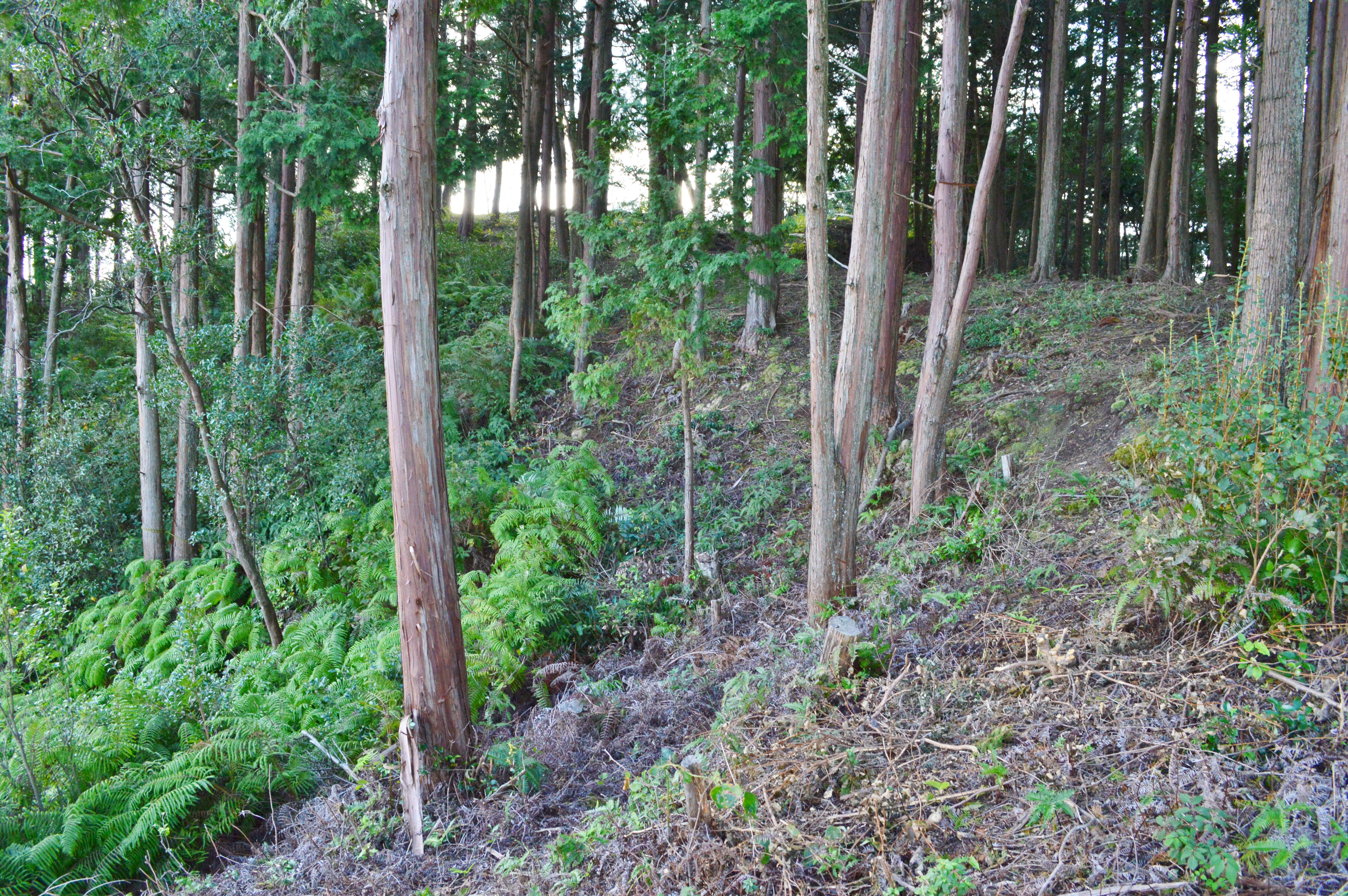
- Yukinoyama Kofun

- Yukinoyama Kofun Yukinoyama Kofun (Japan)
- 35°4′35.22″N 136°8′44.95″E
- Type: Kofun
- Periods: Kofun period
- Location: Ōmihachiman, Higashiōmi, Ryūō, Shiga, Japan.
- Region: Kansai region

History
- Built: 4th century AD

Site notes
- Public access: Yes (no public facilities)

The Yukinoyama Kofun (雪野山古墳) is a Kofun period burial mound located on the border of the cities of Ōmihachiman, Higashiōmi and the town of Ryūō, Shiga Prefecture, in the Kansai region of Japan. The tumulus was designated a National Historic Site of Japan in 2014.

== Overview ==
The Yukinoyama Kofun is located at the 200 meter elevation point on Mount Yukino, a 308.82 meter mountain on the Koto Plain on the southeastern shore of Lake Biwa. The tumulus is a zenpō-kōen-fun (前方後円墳), which is shaped like a keyhole, having one square end and one circular end, when viewed from above, orientated to the north-northeast, or parallel to Lake Biwa. It has an overall length of 70 meters, and was built in two-tiers and covered in fukiishi. No haniwa have been discovered. The tumulus makes use of the natural terrain of the hill in that the lower portion of the posterior circular portion and the front of the anterior rectangular portion are carved directly out of the rhyolite stone of the mountain. The tumulus was discovered only in the summer of 1989, as the tumulus had been remodeled and reused during the Sengoku period as the site of Yukinoyama Castle, which used the posterior circular portion as its inner bailey. From 1989 to 1992, four archaeological excavations had been completed.

These excavations found two burial chambers lined up in the east and west at the top of the posterior circular portion. The pit-type stone chamber on the east side, which is believed to have been the earlier construction, had a main axis from north-to-south, and was made of irregularly shaped lump stones of rhyolite, which was quarried on the mountain itself. The stone chamber was coated with a vermillion paint, and had a clay floor. The sarcophagus is estimated to have been a boat-shaped wooden structure, 5.2 meters in length, 0.9 meters in width at the north end, and 0.8 meters or more at the south end, and had two partition plates to divide the interior into three parts.

A very large amount of grave goods was recovered from the inside of the burial chamber. The body was buried in the central section of the sarcophagus, accompanied by iron swords wrapped in cloth on both sides. Three bronze mirrors were buried on the north side and two on the south side, of which two on the north side and two on the south side were leaned against the north-south partition with the mirrors facing the burial person. Only one mirror on the north side was arranged mirror side down, for unknown reasons. Beads, including cylindrical and magatama beads of jasper were also found. In the northern section of the sarcophagus contained stone products such as arrowheads and fishhooks, and agricultural tools such as sickles, and chisels, and fragments of armor. Outside the casket were the remains of leather helmets, wooden shields, iron swords and spearheads and various shards of pottery. It is estimated that these grave goods date from the early 4th century AD. These artifacts are stored at the Higashiōmi Buried Artifacts Cultural Center (東近江市埋蔵文化財センター, Higashiōmishi Maizō Bunkazai Sentā) and were collectively designated an National Important Cultural Property in 2001.

== Gallery ==
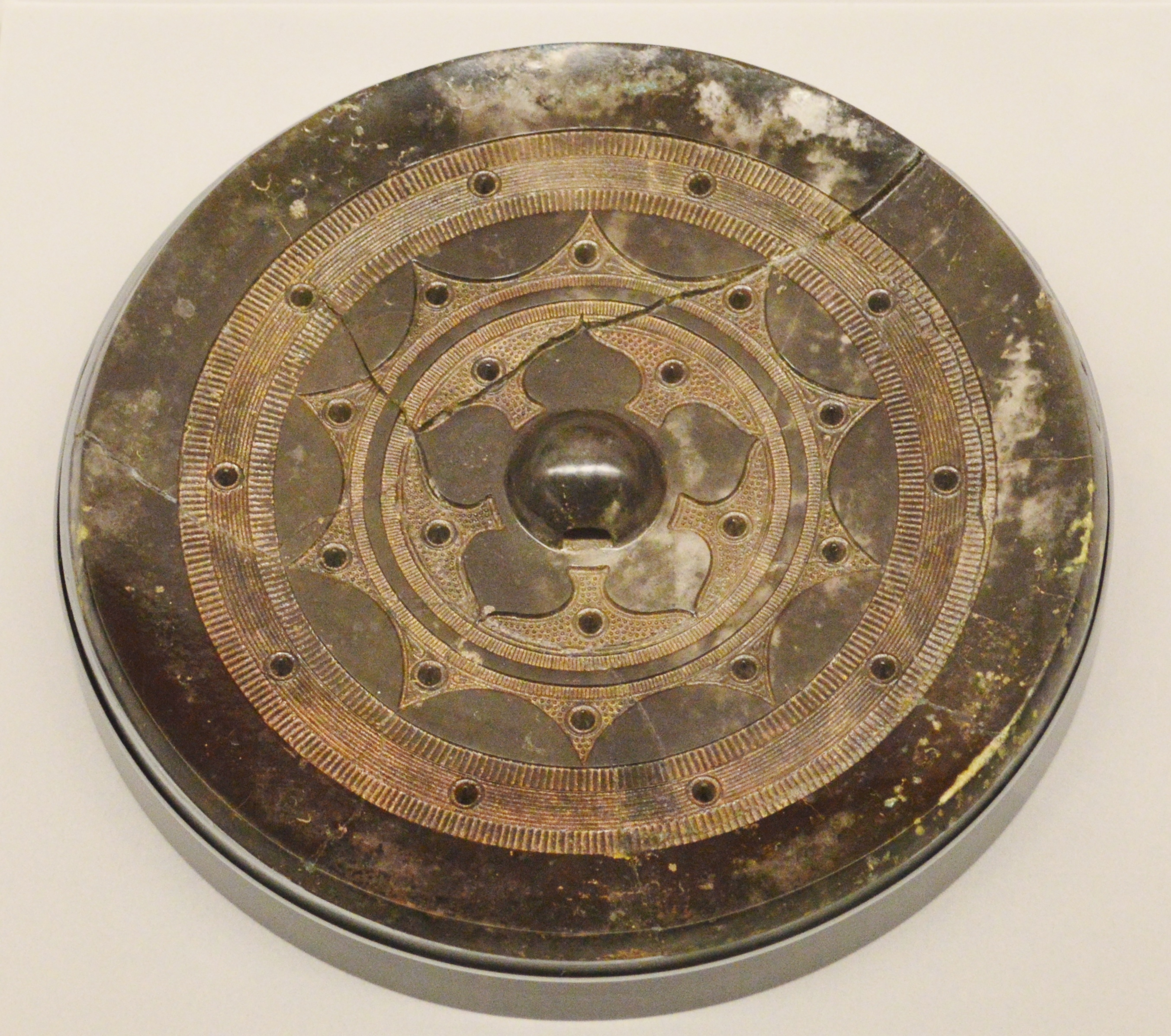
Inward Flower Mirror (No. 1 Mirror)）

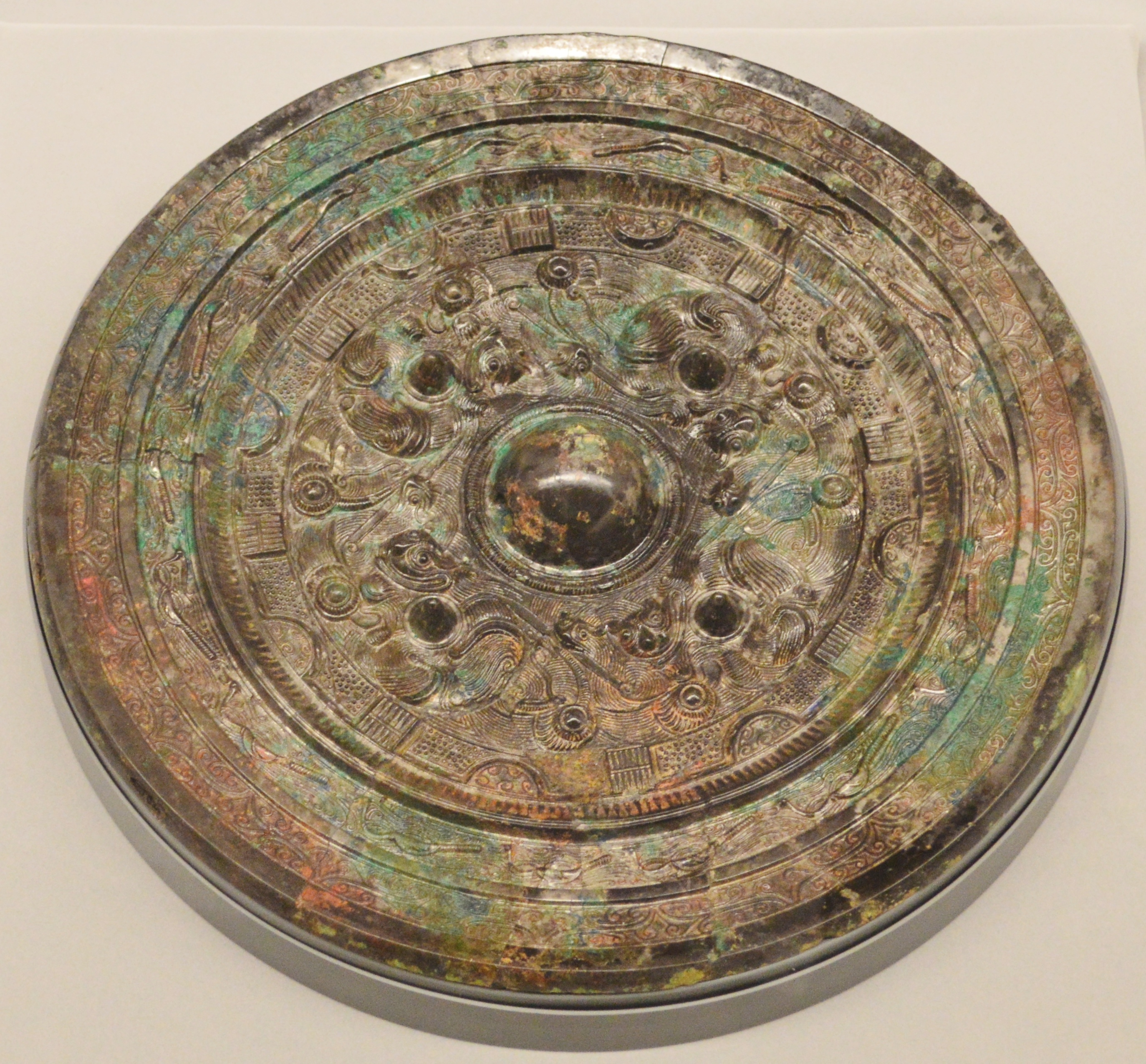
Dragon Mirror (No. 2 Mirror)

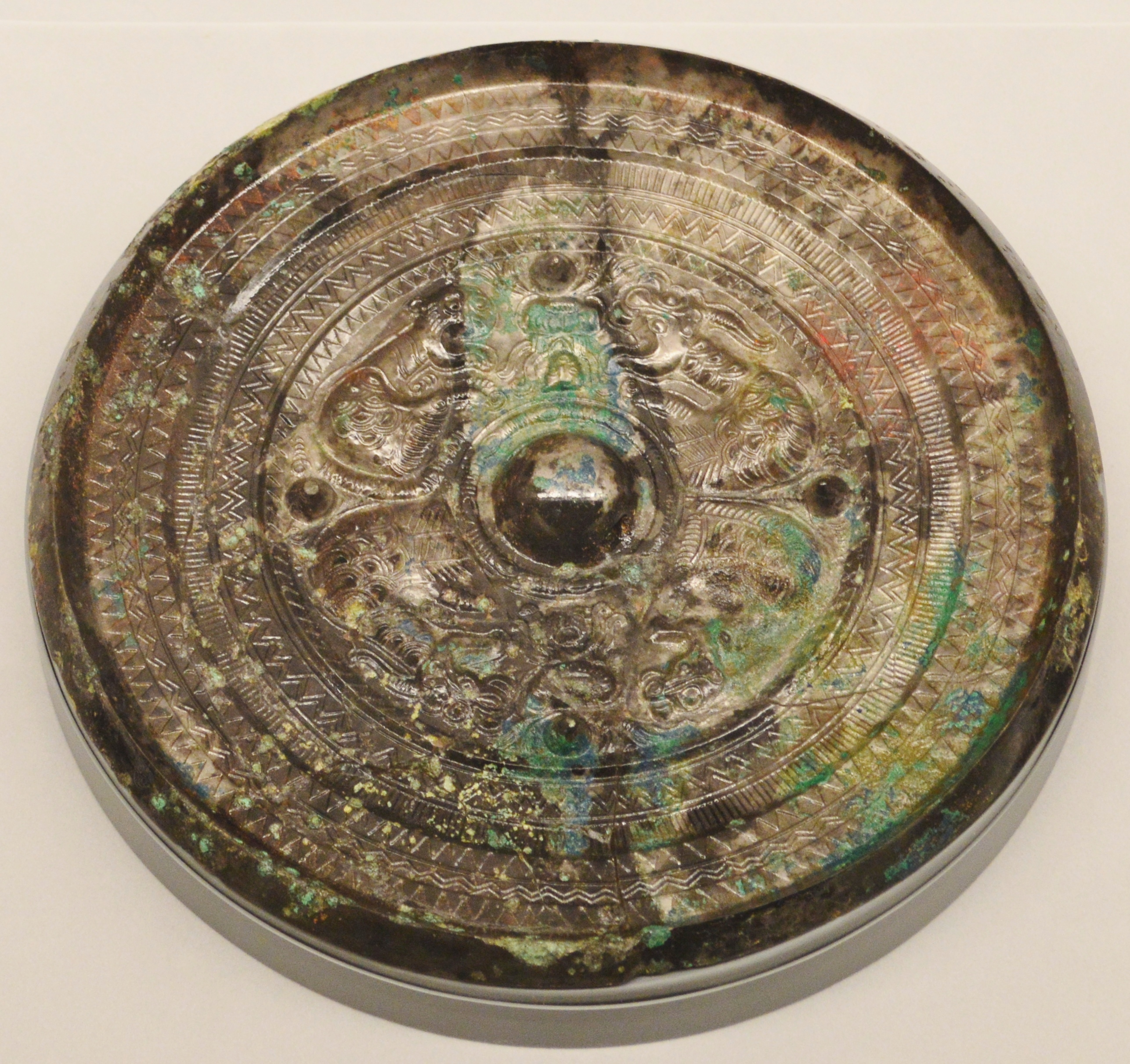
Triangular Margin Wave Band Dragon Mirror (No. 3 Mirror)

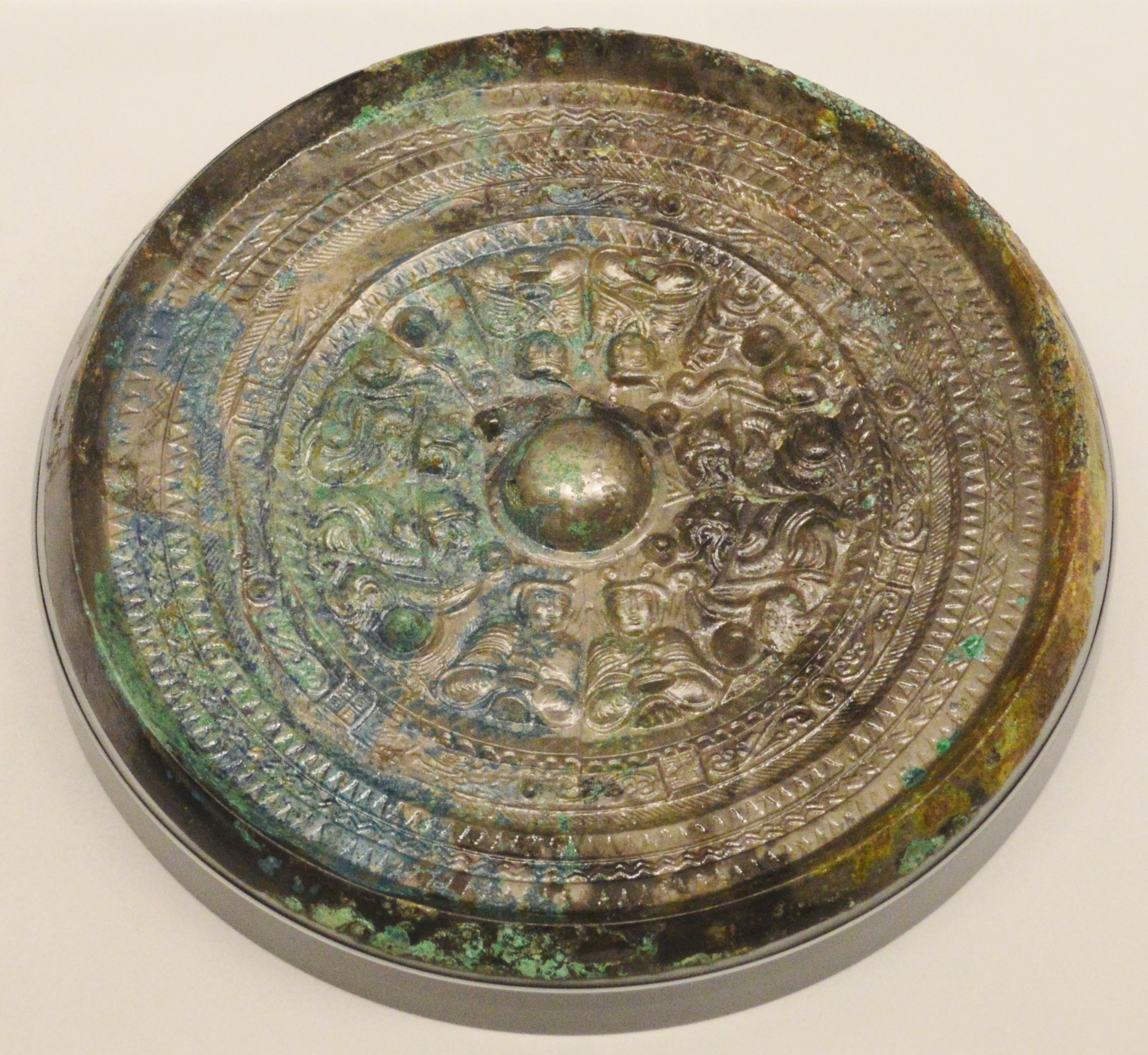
Triangular Edge Karakusa Bunka Four Gods Four Beast Mirror (No. 4 Mirror)

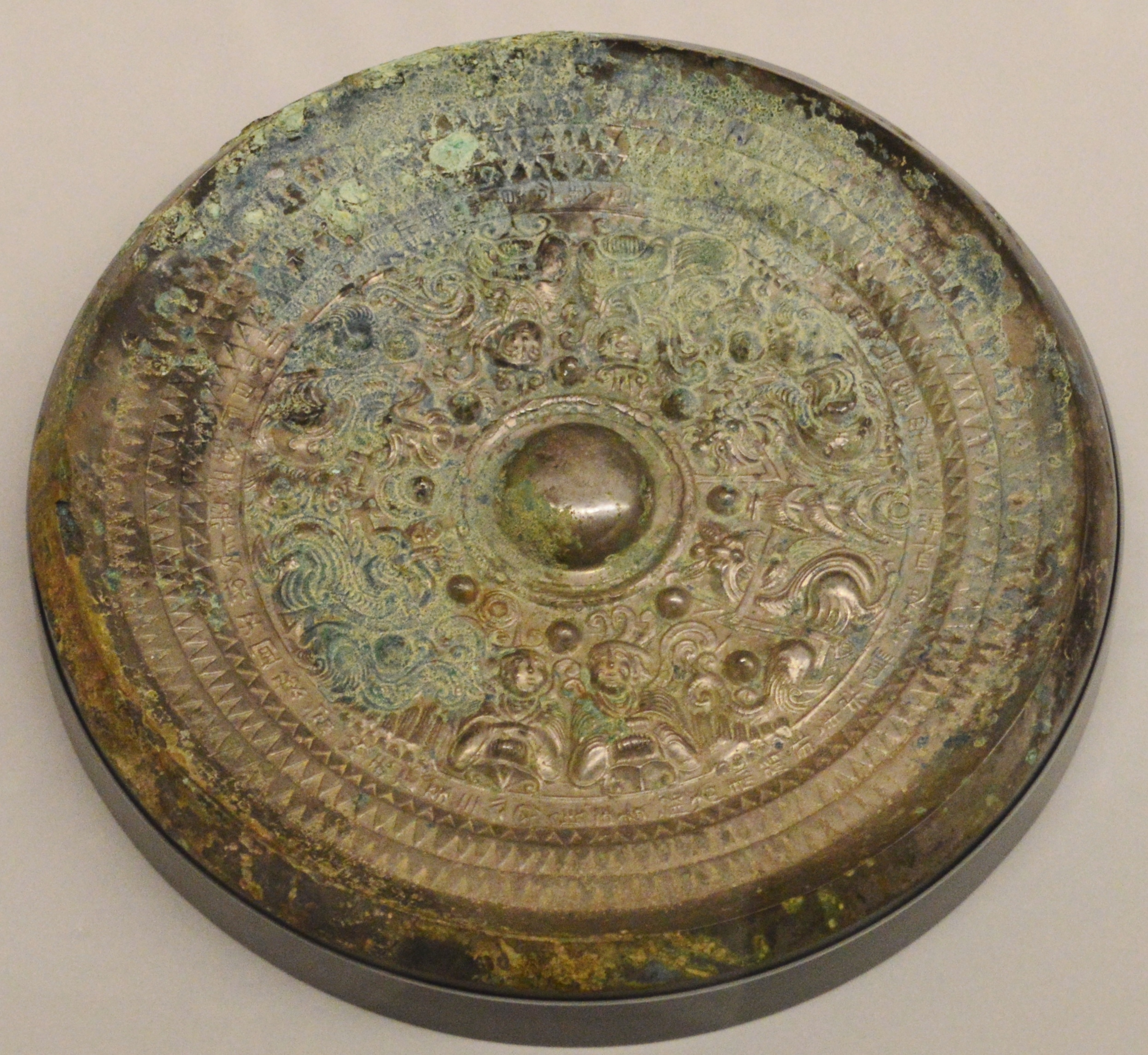
Triangular Edge Four Gods Four Beast Mirror (No. 5 Mirror)

Overall length
70 meters
Posterior circular portion
40 meter diameter x 4.5 meter high x 2-tier
Anterior rectangular portion
30 meters wide x 2.5 meters high x 2-tier

== See also ==
- List of Historic Sites of Japan (Shiga)
