= Azuchi-Hyōtanyama Kofun =

Kofun period burial mound in Ōmihachiman, Japan

- 安土瓢箪山古墳 (Japanese)
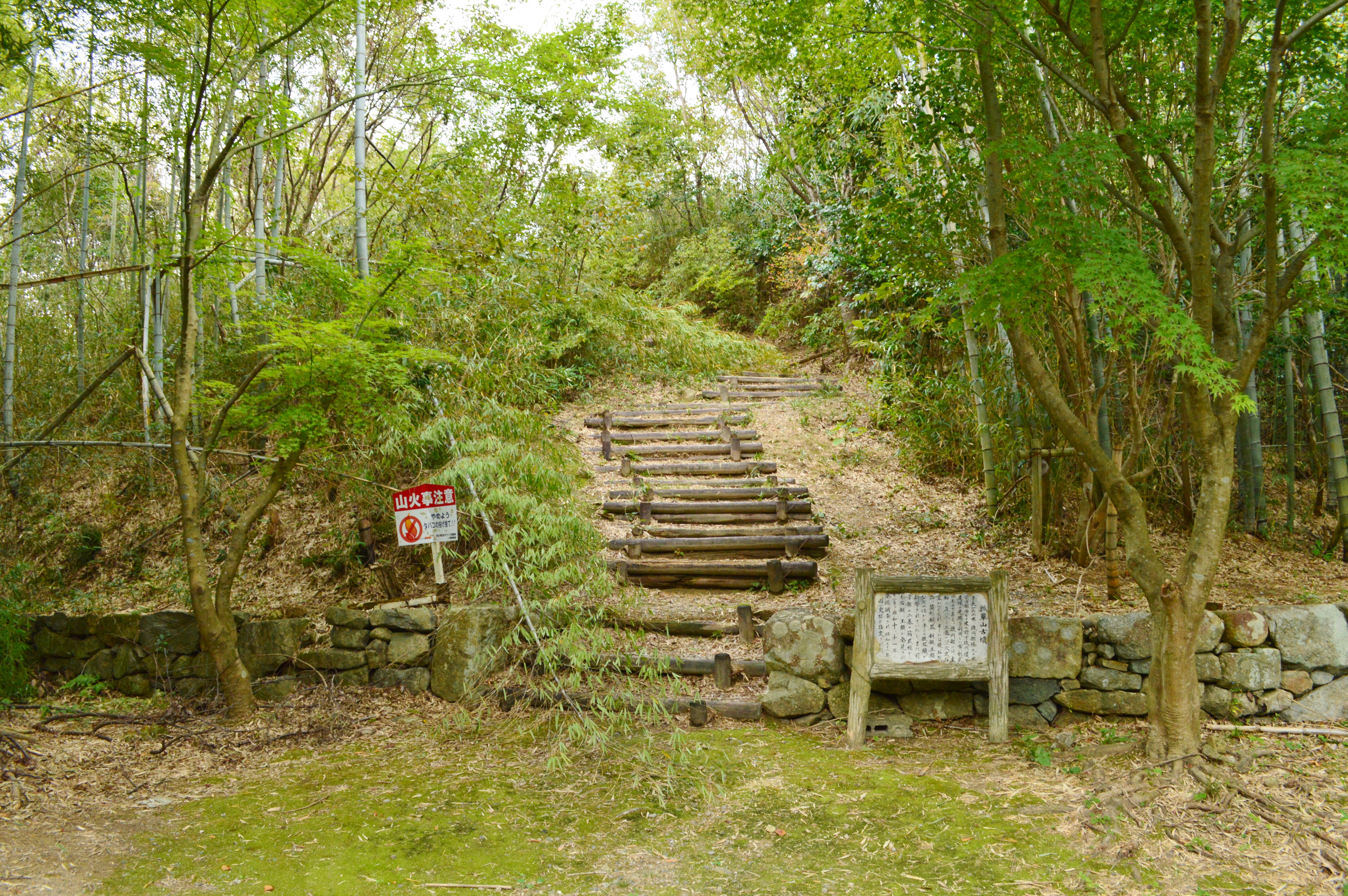
- Azuchi-Hyōtanyama Kofun

- Azuchi-Hyōtanyama Kofun Azuchi-Hyōtanyama Kofun (Japan)
- 35°08′32″N 136°08′54″E
- Type: Kofun
- Periods: Kofun period
- Location: Ōmihachiman, Shiga, Japan
- Region: Kansai region

History
- Built: 4th century AD

Site notes
- Public access: Yes (no public facilities)

The Azuchi-Hyōtanyama Kofun (安土瓢箪山古墳) is a Kofun period burial mound located in the Azuchi neighborhood of the city of Ōmihachiman, Shiga Prefecture in the Kansai region of Japan. The tumulus was designated a National Historic Site of Japan in 1957. With a total length of 134 meters, it is the largest kofun in Shiga Prefecture, and is estimated to have been built around the middle of the 4th century AD (early Kofun period).

== Overview ==
The Azuchi-Hyōtanyama Kofun is located on a ridge extending from Mount Kinugasa, at the western foot of Mount Kannonji on the eastern shore of Lake Biwa. It is a zenpō-kōen-fun (前方後円墳), which is shaped like a keyhole, having one square end and one circular end, when viewed from above, orientated to the northwest. At the time of its construction, the water level of Lake Biwa was higher than at present, and this ridge was a peninsula extending into the lake. The main road connecting the Gamō and Kōka Districts of Ōmi Province is at the base of this peninsula, thus the tumulus was on a strategic position overlooking both land and water transportation.

The tumulus was excavated from 1935 to 1936. The mound is considerably weathered and it is not certain if it was constructed in tiers, or if it had fukiishi. However, numerous cylindrical haniwa and earthenware jars with perforated bottoms have been found. The burial chamber consisted of three pit-type stone-lined chambers in the posterior circular portion, and two box-type sarcophagus in the anterior rectangular portion. A large quantity of grave goods was recovered from these five burial chambers, including bronze mirrors, iron swords and spearheads, bronze arrowheads, beads and shell jewelry. A restored model of the central stone chamber and replicas of many of the artifacts recovered are on display at the Shiga Prefectural Azuchi Castle Archaeological Museum (滋賀県立安土城考古博物館, Shiga Kenritsu Adzuchijō Kōko Hakubutsukan), with the actual artifacts stored at the Kyoto University Museum. The central stone chamber in the posterior circular portion is considered to be the main burial.

== Gallery ==
excavated burial chamber

Bronze mirrors

Iron weapons

Bronze arrowheads, shell jewelry

The tumulus is located bout 25-minute walk from Azuchi Station on the JR West Tōkaidō Main Line.

Overall length
134 meters
Posterior circular portion
78 meter diameter x 13 meter high
"Neck" portion
56 meters wide
Anterior rectangular portion
62 meters wide x 7 meters high

== See also ==
- List of Historic Sites of Japan (Shiga)
