= Ryūō, Shiga =

Ryūō 竜王町
- Town
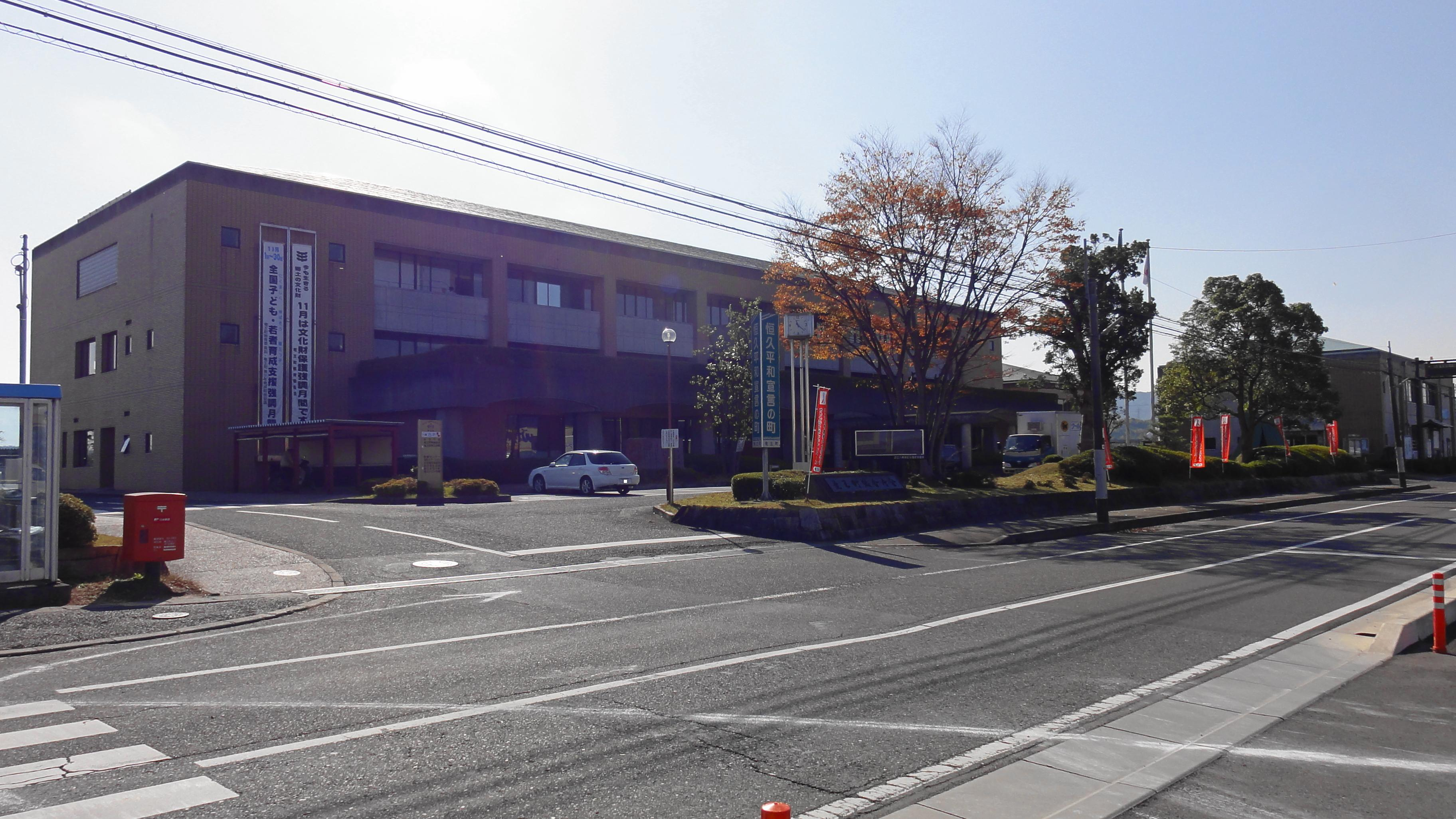
- Ryūō town hall

- Flag Emblem

- Location of Ryūō in Shiga Prefecture

- Location in Japan
- Coordinates: 35°4′N 136°7′E
- Country: Japan
- Region: Kansai
- Prefecture: Shiga

Government
  - Mayor: Hideharu Nishida (2016–present)

Area
  - Total: 44.52 km^{2} (17.19 sq mi)

Population (August 31, 2021)
  - Total: 11,786
  - Density: 264.7/km^{2} (685.7/sq mi)
- Time zone: UTC+09:00 (JST)
- City hall address: 3 Oguchi, Ryūō-chō, Gamō-gun, Shiga-ken; 520-2592
- Website: Official website
- Symbols
- Flower: Rhododendron farrerae
- Tree: Pine

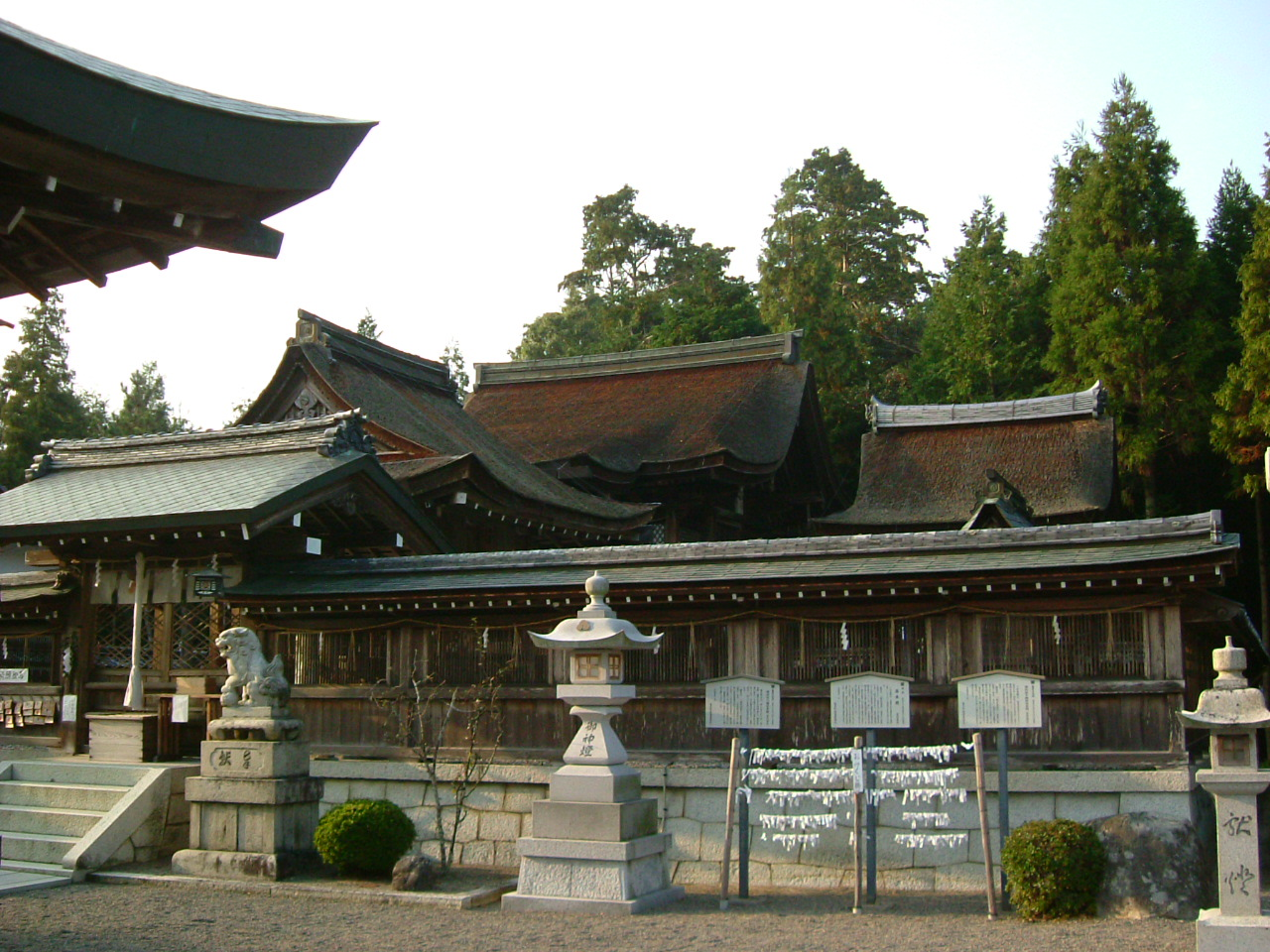
Namura Jinja Haiden

Ryūō (竜王町, Ryūō-chō) is a town located in Gamō District, Shiga Prefecture, Japan. As of 31 August 2021, the town had an estimated population of 11,786 in 4499 households and a population density of 260 persons per km^{2}. The total area of the town is 44.52 square kilometres (17.19 sq mi).

== Geography ==
Ryūō is located in the center of Shiga Prefecture. The Hino River and its 3 tributaries, Zenkōji-gawa, Sofu-gawa, and Sōshirō-gawa, run on the flat land between Mount Kagami on the west and Mount Yukino on the east. Hilly regions cover the southern area in and out of Ryūō.

- Mountains: Kagami-yama (also called Western Ryūō-zan), Yukinoyama (also called Eastern Ryūō-zan)
- Rivers: Hino, Zenkōji, Sofu, Sōshirō

=== Neighbouring municipalities ===
Shiga Prefecture

- Higashiōmi
- Koka
- Konan
- Ōmihachiman
- Yasu

=== Climate ===
Aishō has a humid subtropical climate (Köppen Cfa) characterized by warm summers and cool winters with light to no snowfall. The average annual temperature in Aishō is 14.8 °C. The average annual rainfall is 1433 mm with September as the wettest month. The temperatures are highest on average in August, at around 26.6 °C, and lowest in January, at around 3.5 °C.

== Demographics ==
Per Japanese census data, the population of Ryūō peaked around the year 2000 and has declined slightly since.

Historical population
Year	Pop.	±%
1920	7,933	—
1930	8,038	+1.3%
1940	8,001	−0.5%
1950	9,411	+17.6%
1960	8,911	−5.3%
1970	8,669	−2.7%
1980	10,396	+19.9%
1990	12,762	+22.8%
2000	13,370	+4.8%
2010	12,916	−3.4%
2020	11,789	−8.7%

== History ==
The area of Ryūō was part of ancient Ōmi Province. On April 1, 1889 the village of Nae (苗村) was formed within Gamō District, Shiga by the merger of the hamlets of Kawamori (川守村), Iwai (岩井村), Yamanoue (山之上村), Hayashi (林村), Shō (庄村), Shinano (信濃村), Kayochō (駕輿丁村), Shima (島村), and Ayado (綾戸村). Likewise, the village of Kagamiyama (鏡山村) was formed by the merger of the hamlets of Kagami (鏡村), Yamazura (山面村), Ukawa (鵜川村), Oguchi (小口村), Kuzushi (薬師村), Shichiri (七里村), Kawakami (川上村), Hashimoto (橋本村), Yuge (弓削村), Sue (須恵村), Nishikawa (西川村), Nishiyokozeki (西横関村), Yamanaka (山中村), and Okaya (岡屋村). On April 29, 1955 Kagamiyama and Nae merged to form the town of Ryūō. The name comes from the name of a mountain shared between the two villages.

== Government ==
Ryūō has a mayor-council form of government with a directly elected mayor and a unicameral city council of 12 members. Ryūō, collectively with the town of Hino, contributes one member to the Shiga Prefectural Assembly. In terms of national politics, the town is part of Shiga 4th district of the lower house of the Diet of Japan.

=== Industry ===
- Car Industry - Daihatsu Motor Co., Ltd.
- Industry Ratio
  - Farmer 6.3%
  - Industry 52.4%
  - Service 41.3%

== Education ==
Ryūō has two public elementary schools and one public middle school operated by the town government. The town does not have a high school.

Previously the city hosted a Brazilian school, Colégio Latino de Shiga. It moved to Ōmihachiman and changed its name to Colégio Latino do Japão.

== Transportation ==
=== Railway ===
Ryūō has no passenger rail service. The nearest station is Shinohara Station, but many people find the Ōmi-Hachiman Station or Yasu Station to be more convenient.

=== Highways ===
- Meishin Expressway
- National Route 8
- National Route 477

=== Bus ===
- Ōmi Bus

== Sister cities ==
Ryūō's sister cities are:

- Kai, Yamanashi, Japan
- Sault Ste. Marie, Michigan, United States, since 1974

== Local attractions ==
- Mitsui Outlet Park Shiga Ryūō
- Namura Jinja, a Shinto shrine with a National Treasure honden
- Ryūō-ji, Buddhist temple founded in the Nara period.
- Yukinoyama Kofun, Kofun period tumulus, National Historic Site
