= Dainaka Lake Minami Site =

Archaeological site in Õmihachiman, Kinki, Japan

Dainaka-no-ko Minami iseki
- 大中の湖南遺跡 (Japanese)
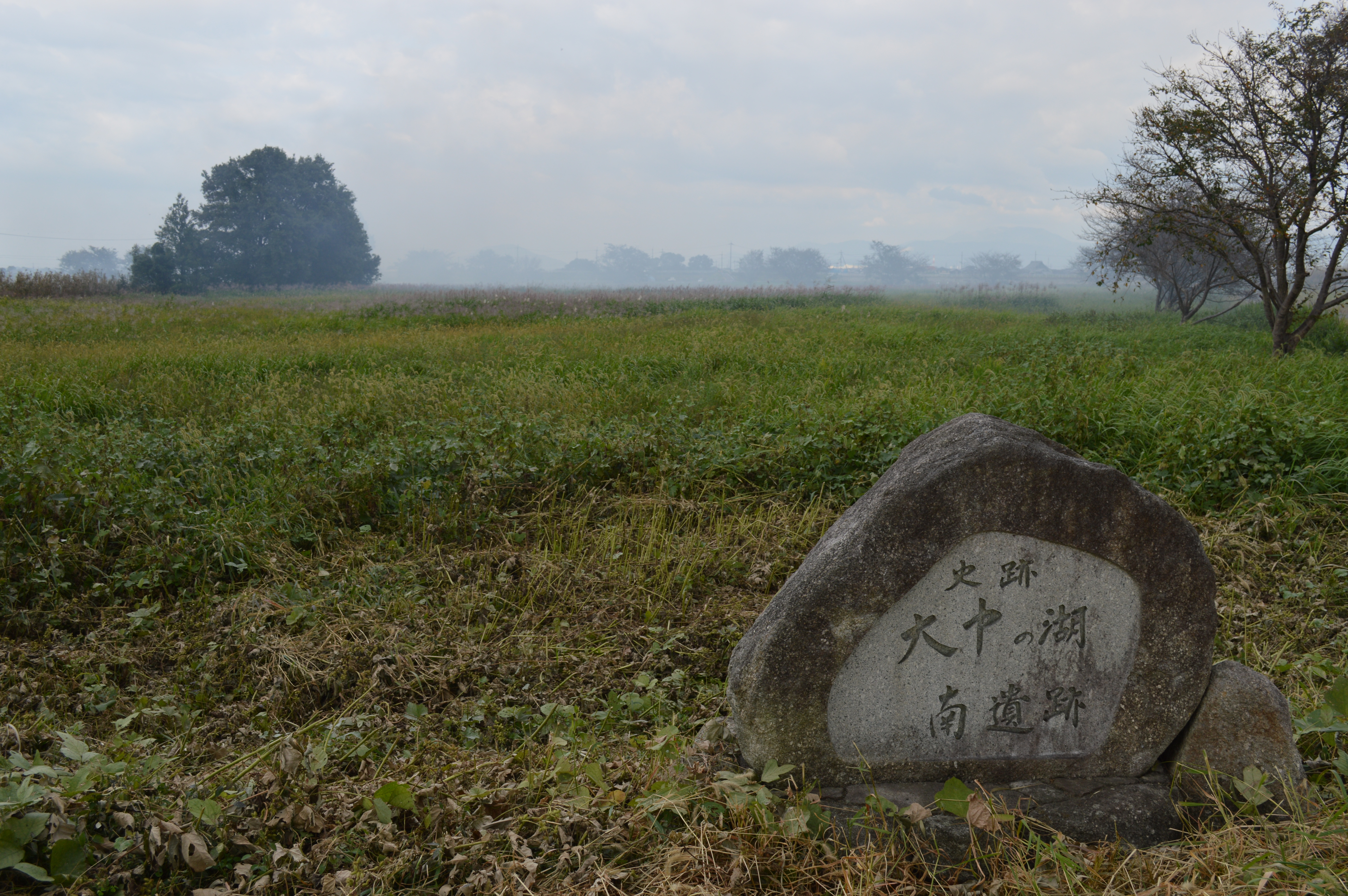
- Dainaka-no-ko Minami iseki

- Dainaka-no-ko Minami iseki Dainaka Lake Minami Site (Japan)
- 35°10′22″N 136°07′48″E
- Periods: Yayoi period
- Location: Ōmihachiman, Shiga, Japan
- Region: Kinai region

Site notes
- Public access: Yes (no facilities)

The Lake Dainaka South Site (大中の湖南遺跡, Dainaka-no-ko Minami iseki) is an archaeological site containing the ruins of an early-middle Yayoi period settlement, located in what is now part of the city of Ōmihachiman, Shiga Prefecture in the Kinki region of Japan. It was designated a National Historic Site of Japan in 1973.

== Overview ==
Lake Dainaka was the largest of what were once more than 40 small lakes within the Ōmi Basin, near the shoreline of the much larger Lake Biwa, to which it was once connected. Lake Dainaka was located on the eastern shore of the central part of Lake Biwa, from which it was separated by a sandbar. It was almost circular, with a diameter of four kilometers and a maximum depth of 2.7 meters. The water surface was 81 meters above sea level, which was lower than that of Lake Biwa, which is 84 meters. The area of Lake Dainaka was 15.4 square kilometers, which was slightly larger than Lake Suwa in Nagano Prefecture. After World War II, Lake Dainaka was destroyed in a large-scale land reclamation project to create new lands for agriculture, and it no longer exists.

The Lake Dainaka South Site was discovered during an agricultural land improvement project in 1964. As a result of the archaeological excavation, the trace of a village with paddy fields, and numerous wooden farming implements were excavated, along with fishing gear such as fish traps, spears and fishing bows, as well as Yayoi pottery and ritual objects. The paddy fields extended over a 9200 square meter area, and contained ridges and irrigation channels indicating sophisticated water management technology. Subsequent investigations have also unearthed the ruins of a jetty.

The site has been preserved as an archaeological park with replicated Yayoi-period dwellings, some excavated items are on display at the Azuchi Castle Archaeological Museum. The site is located about ten minutes by car from Azuchi Station on the JR West Biwako Line.

== Gallery ==
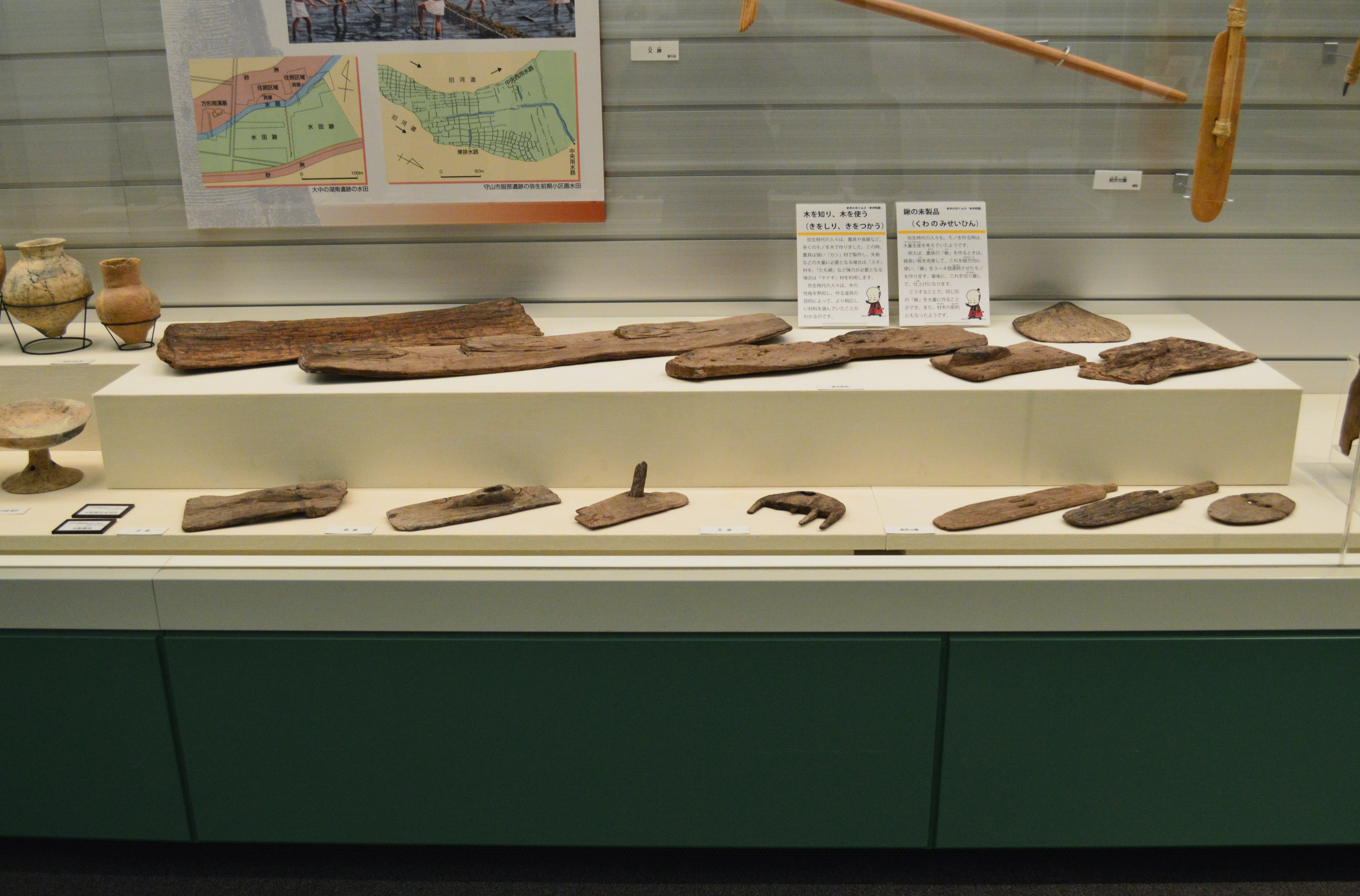
Wooden artifacts kept at the Azuchi Castle Archaeological Museum

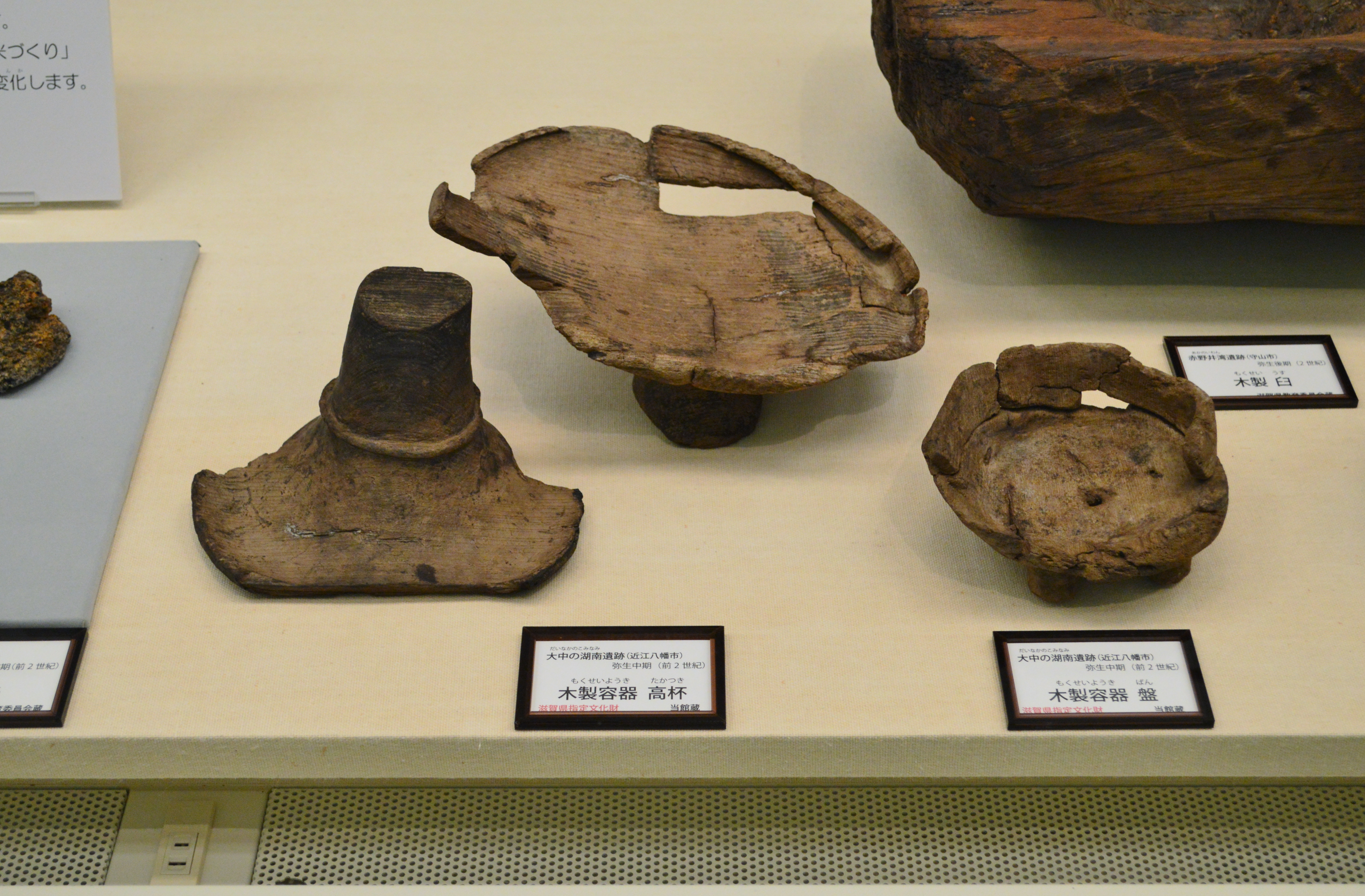
Wooden bowls

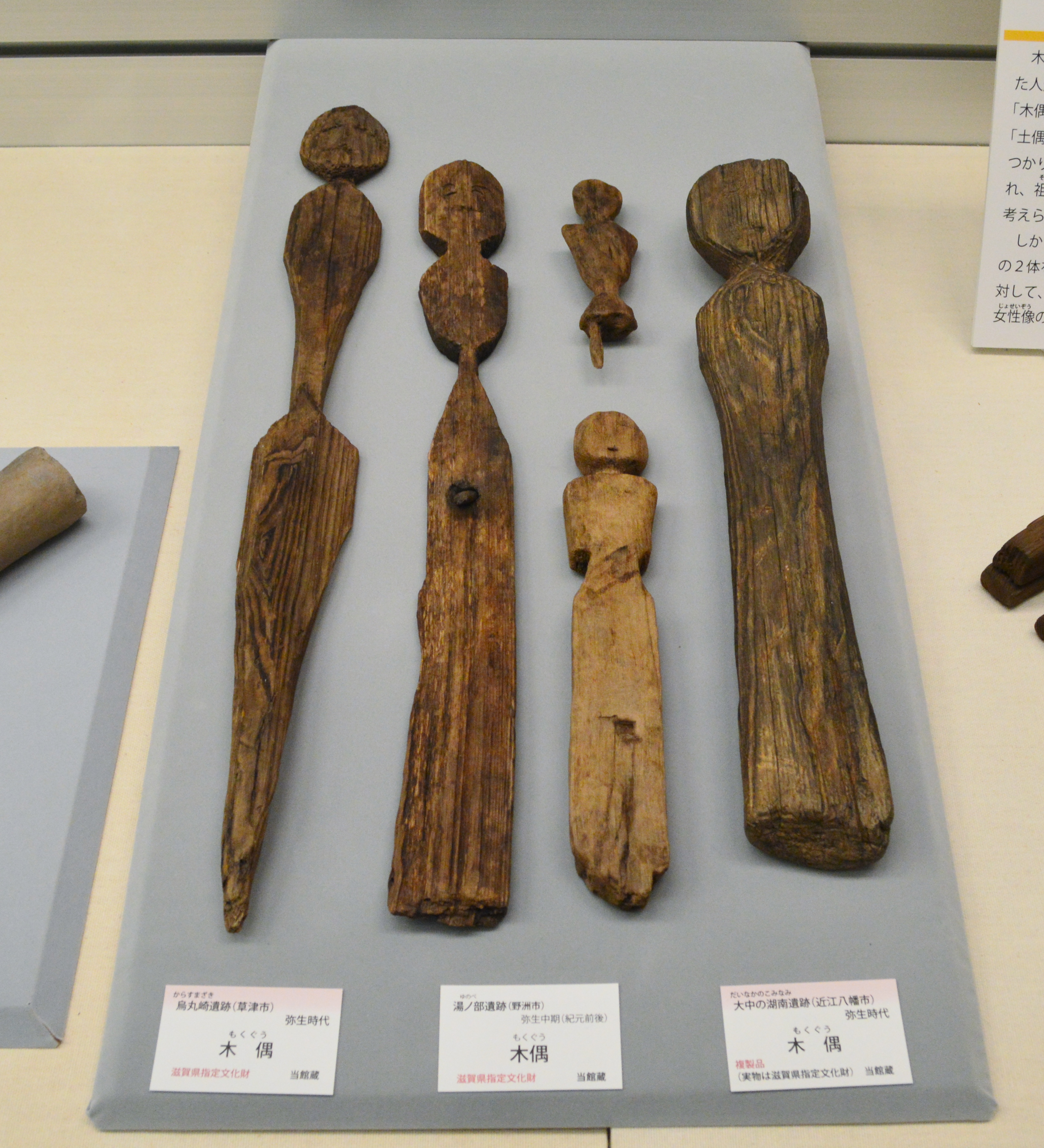
Ritual wooden objects

== See also ==
- List of Historic Sites of Japan (Shiga)
