= Kawara Museum =

Museum in Shiga Prefecture, Japan

Coordinates: 35°8′26″N 136°5′31″E

Omihachiman City Rooftile Museum
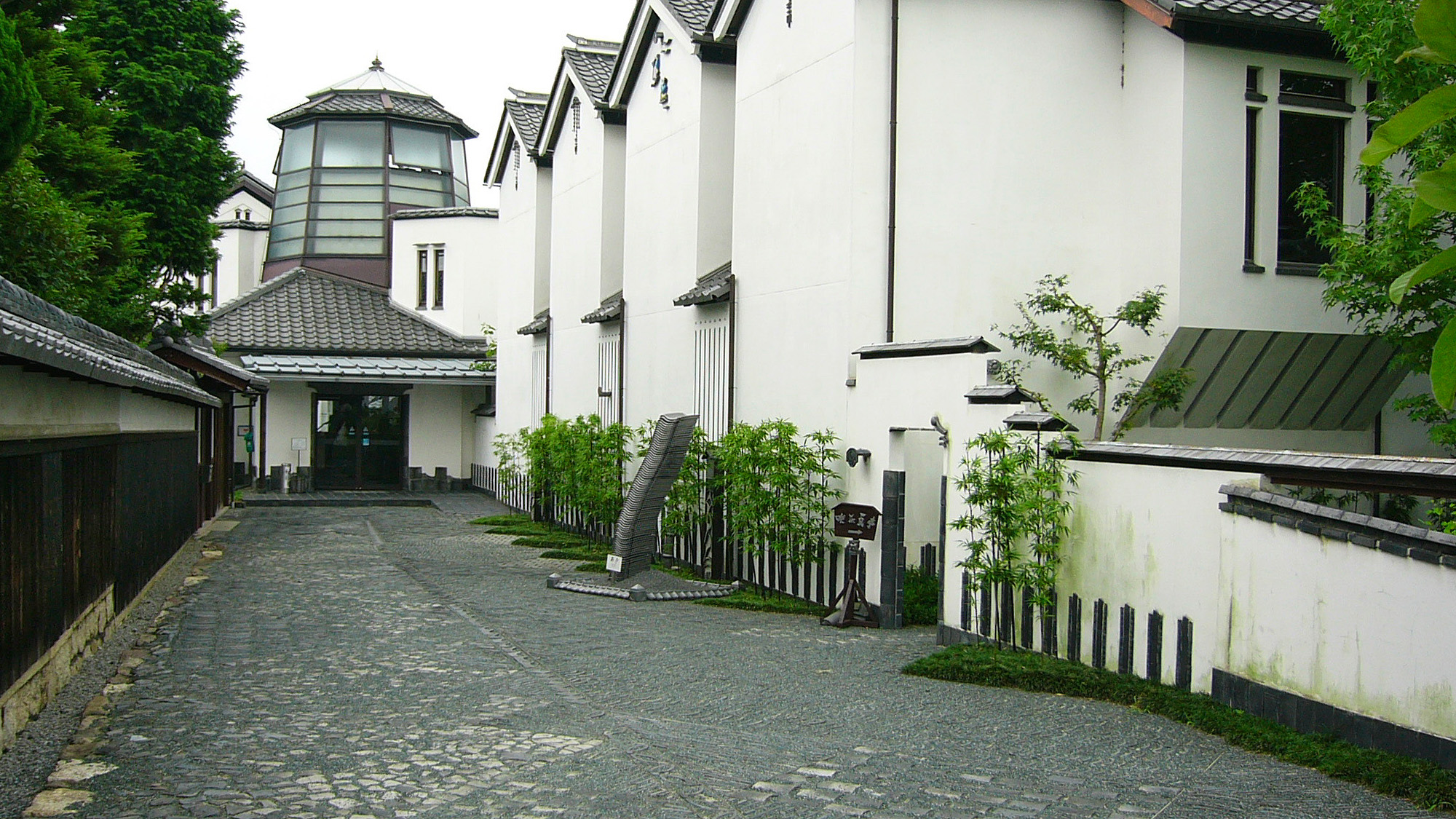
- Established: March 1995
- Location: 738-2 Taga-chō, Ōmihachiman, Shiga, Japan

The Kawara Museum (近江八幡市立かわらミュージアム)(Omihachiman City Rooftile Museum) is a museum in Ōmihachiman, Shiga, Japan, devoted to Japanese-style roof tiles (kawara).

== Buildings ==
The museum consists of ten buildings with roof tiles which form a whole pavilion. The new tiles on the roof of the museum were blackened to make them look older and thus fit in better with the other buildings in the neighborhood.

== Exhibits ==
In the permanent exhibition room on the first floor objects are displayed to show the history of Omihachiman roof tiles and the process by which they are made. Images of the city of Omihachiman are displayed at the entrance, and there is a large 3-dimensional photograph of the roof tiles of the houses in Shinmachi street at the innermost corner of the exhibition room.

== See also ==
- Onigawara, a type of Japanese roof ornamentation
