= Hachimanyama Castle =

Castle ruins in Ōmihachiman, Japan

- 八幡山城
- Ōmihachiman, Japan
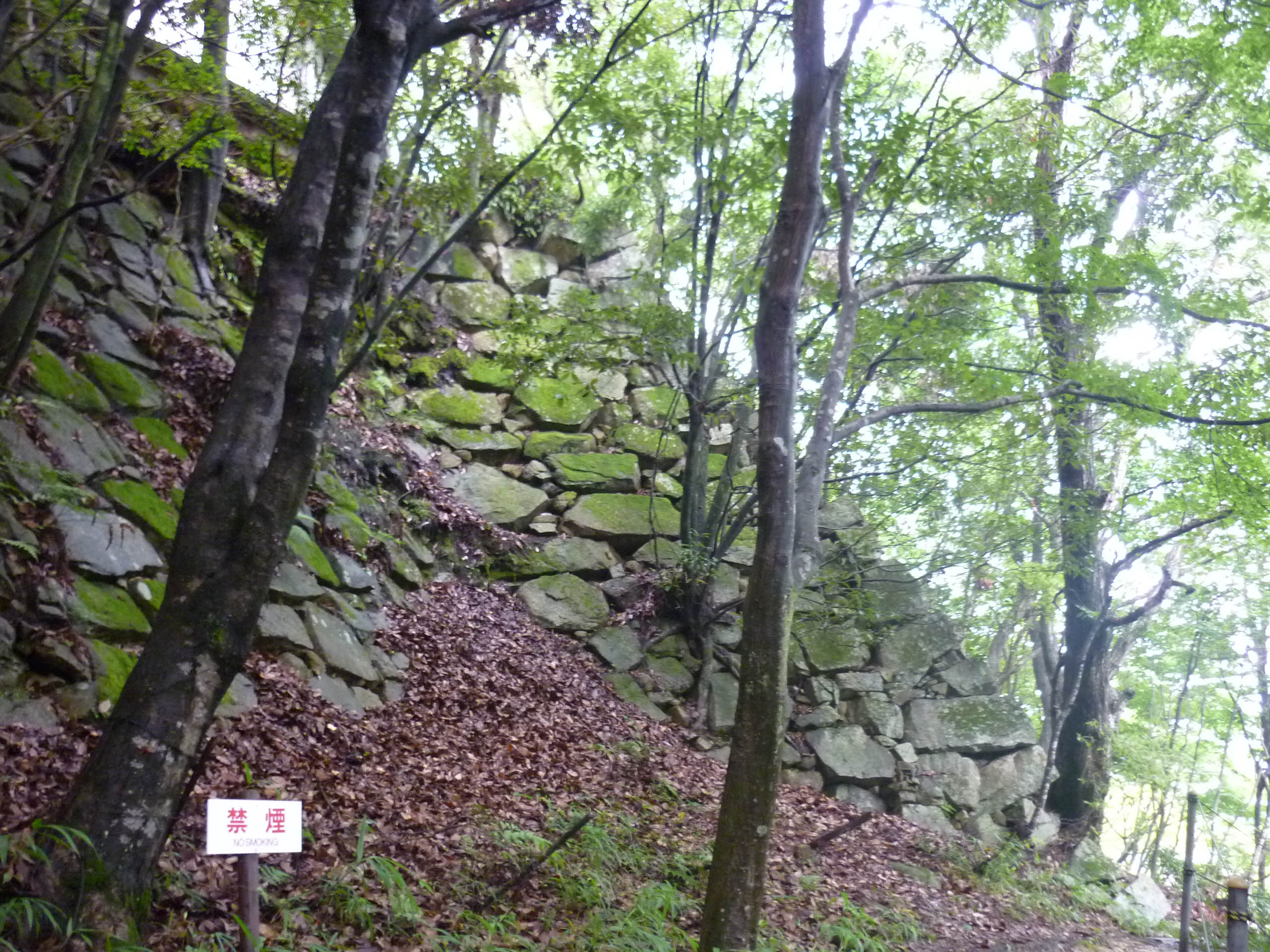
- Stone wall of Honmaru compound

Site information
- Type: Mountaintop style castle
- Owner: Toyotomi clan
- Condition: ruins

Site history
- Built: 1585
- Built by: Toyotomi Hidetsugu
- Materials: Stone walls
- Demolished: 1595

Garrison information
- Past commanders: Toyotomi Hidetsugu, Kyōgoku Takatsugu

Hachimanyama Castle (八幡山城, Hachimanyama-jō) was a castle in Ōmihachiman, Japan, on the eastern shore of Lake Biwa in Shiga prefecture. It was the home castle of Toyotomi Hidetsugu, the nephew of Toyotomi Hideyoshi.

== History ==
Hachimanyama Castle was built by Toyotomi Hidetsugu in 1585 under orders from Toyotomi Hideyoshi. Azuchi Castle's materials were used in the construction of the castle, and Azuchi city's functions were moved to Hachiman city. In 1595, Kyōgoku Takatsugu moved to Ōtsu Castle and Hachimanyama Castle was abandoned.

== Current state ==
Hachimanyama castle is now in ruins, with some extant stone walls and wet moat. The Buddhist temple Zuiryuji now occupies the former honmaru, or main bailey. Hachimanyama Ropeway provides services between the mountaintop and Himure Hachimangū. The castle was listed as one of the Continued Top 100 Japanese Castles in 2017.

== Gallery ==
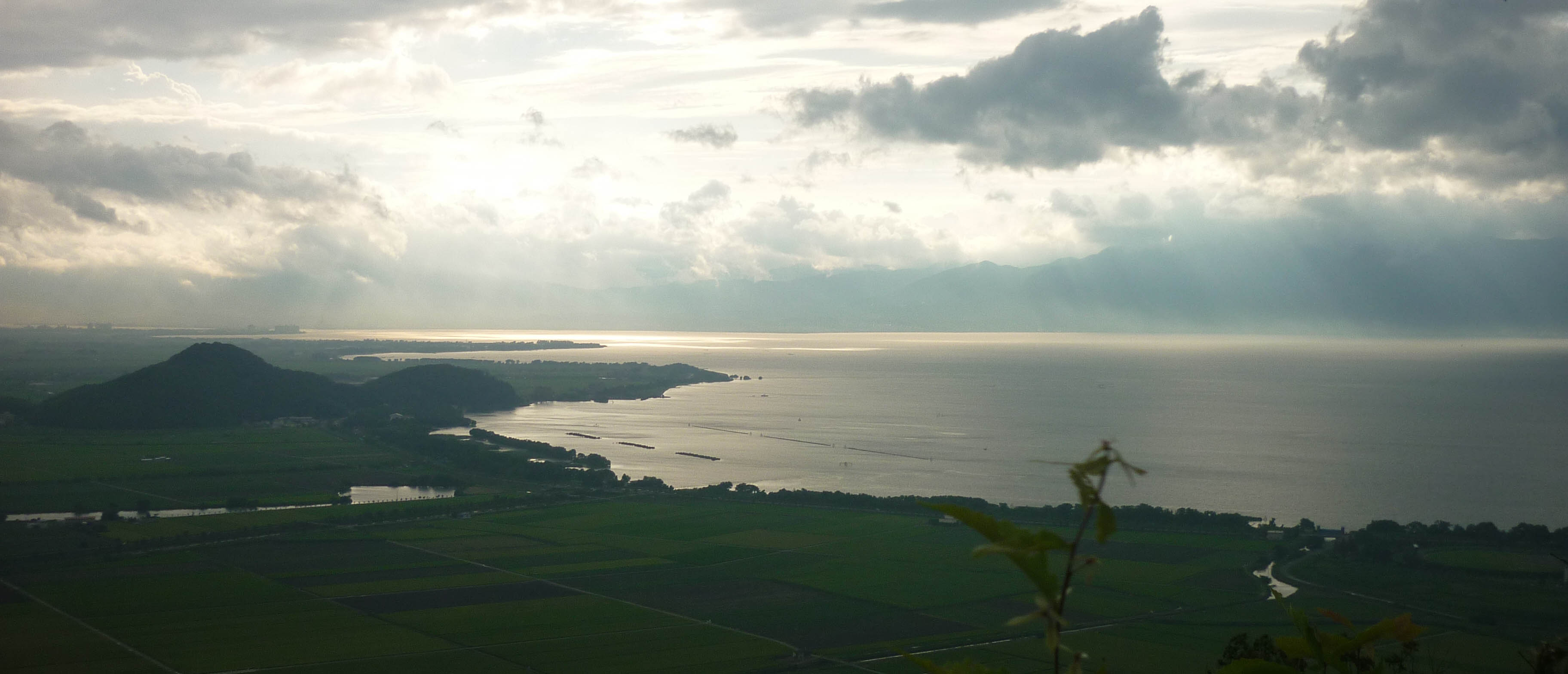
View from Nishinomaru, or western compound

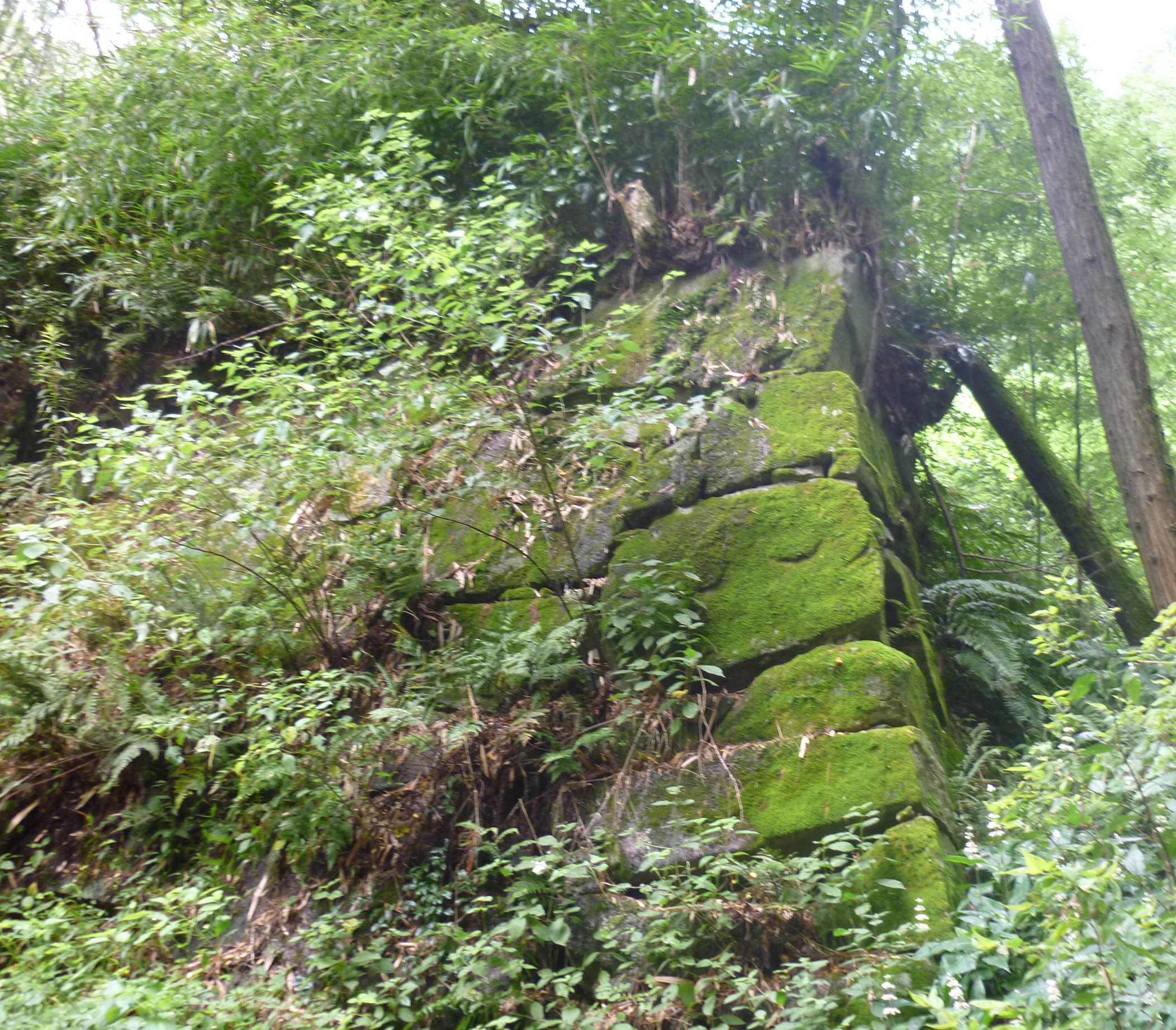
Stone wall of Toyotomi Hidetsugu's residence

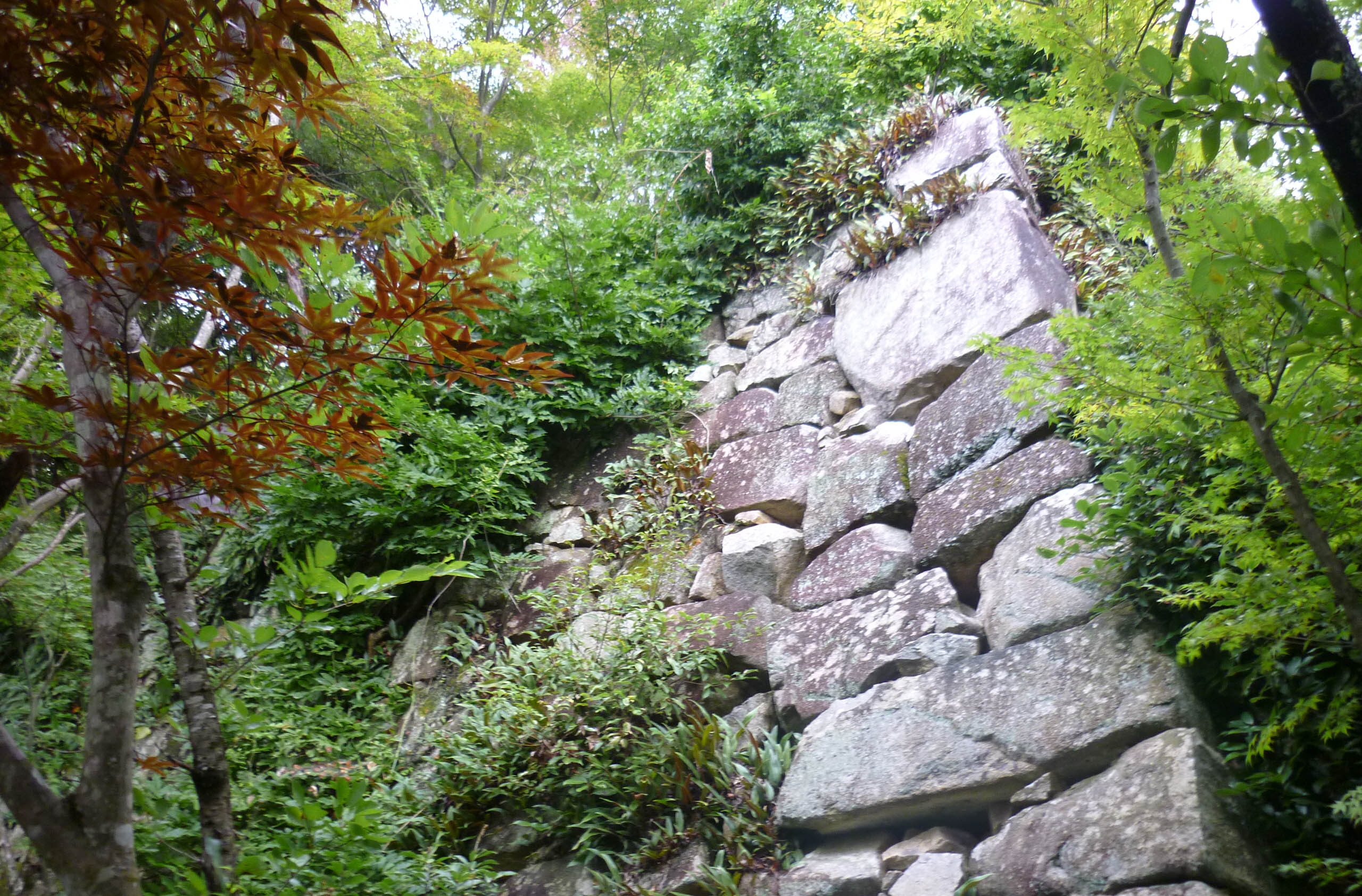
Stone wall of Ninomaru, or secondary compound

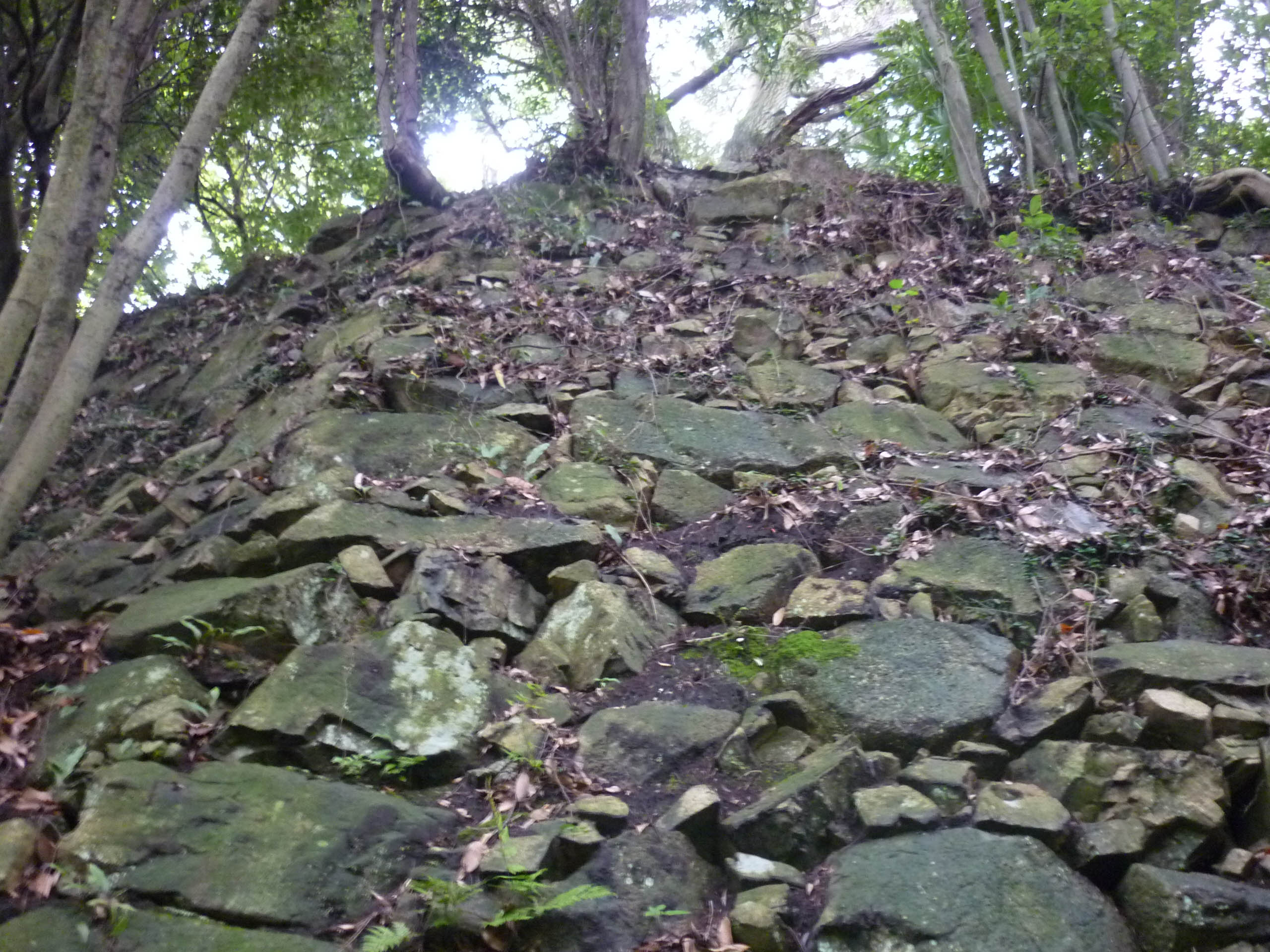
Stone wall of Nishinomaru, or western compound

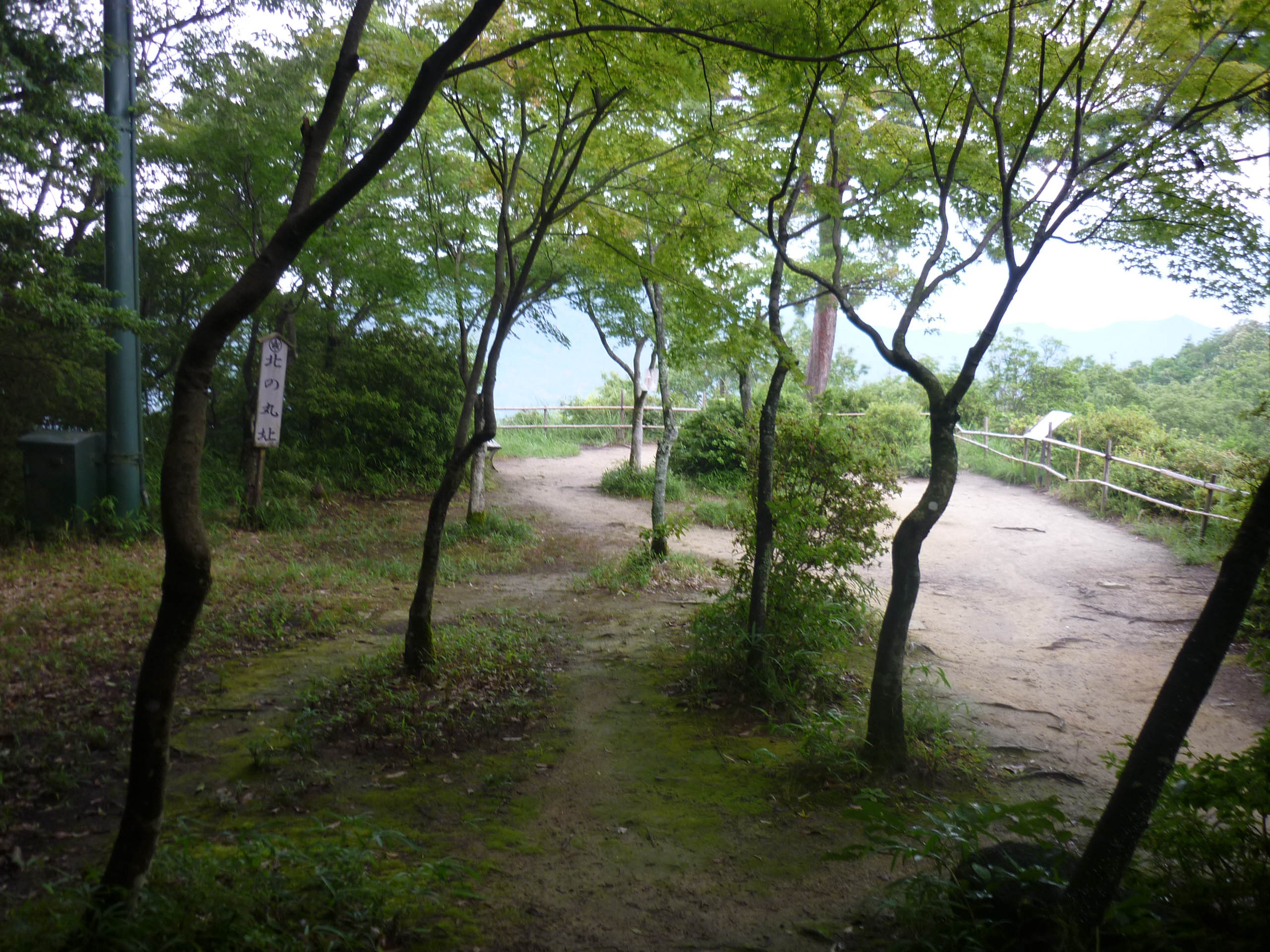
Kitanomaru, or northern compound

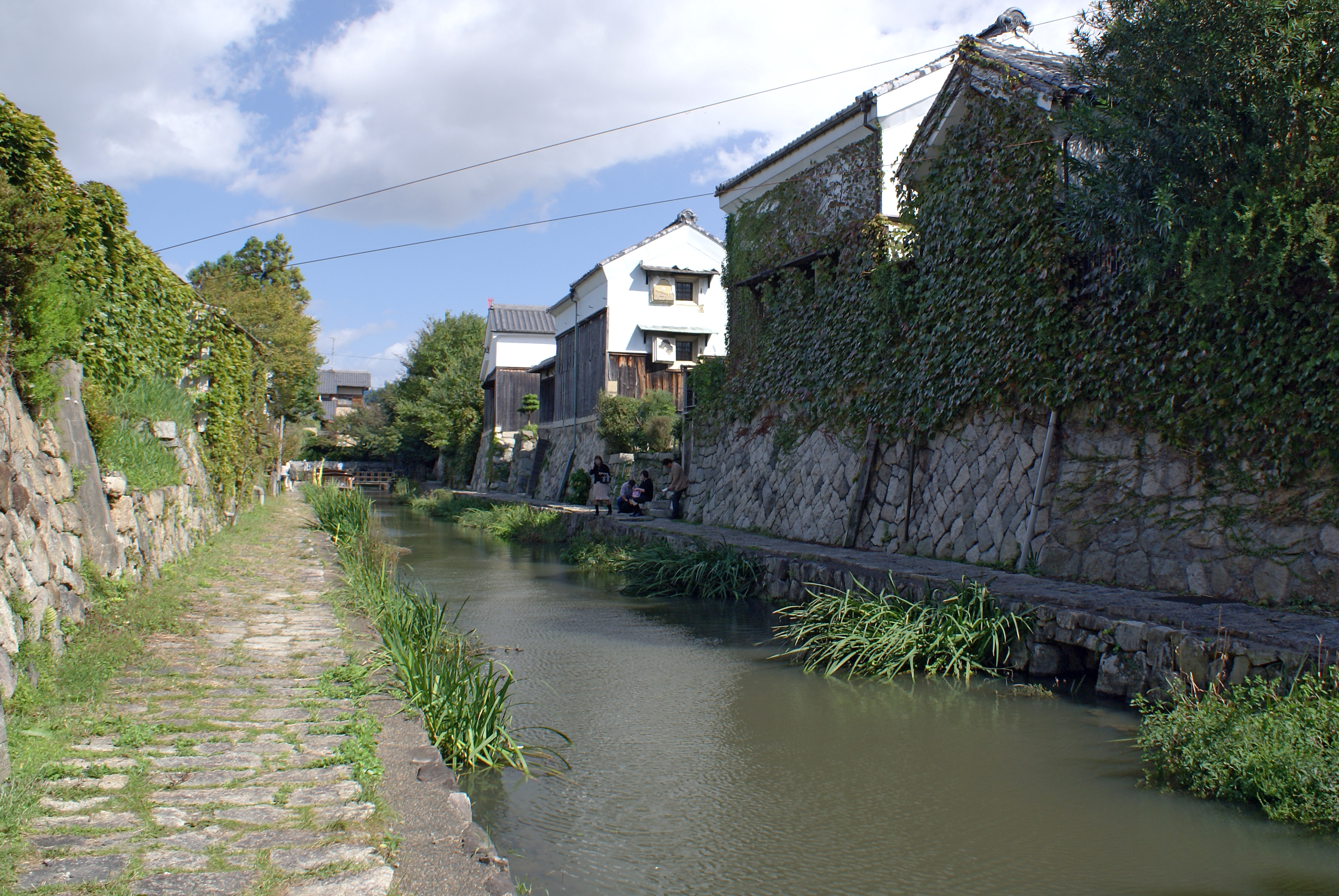
Wet moat of Hachiman

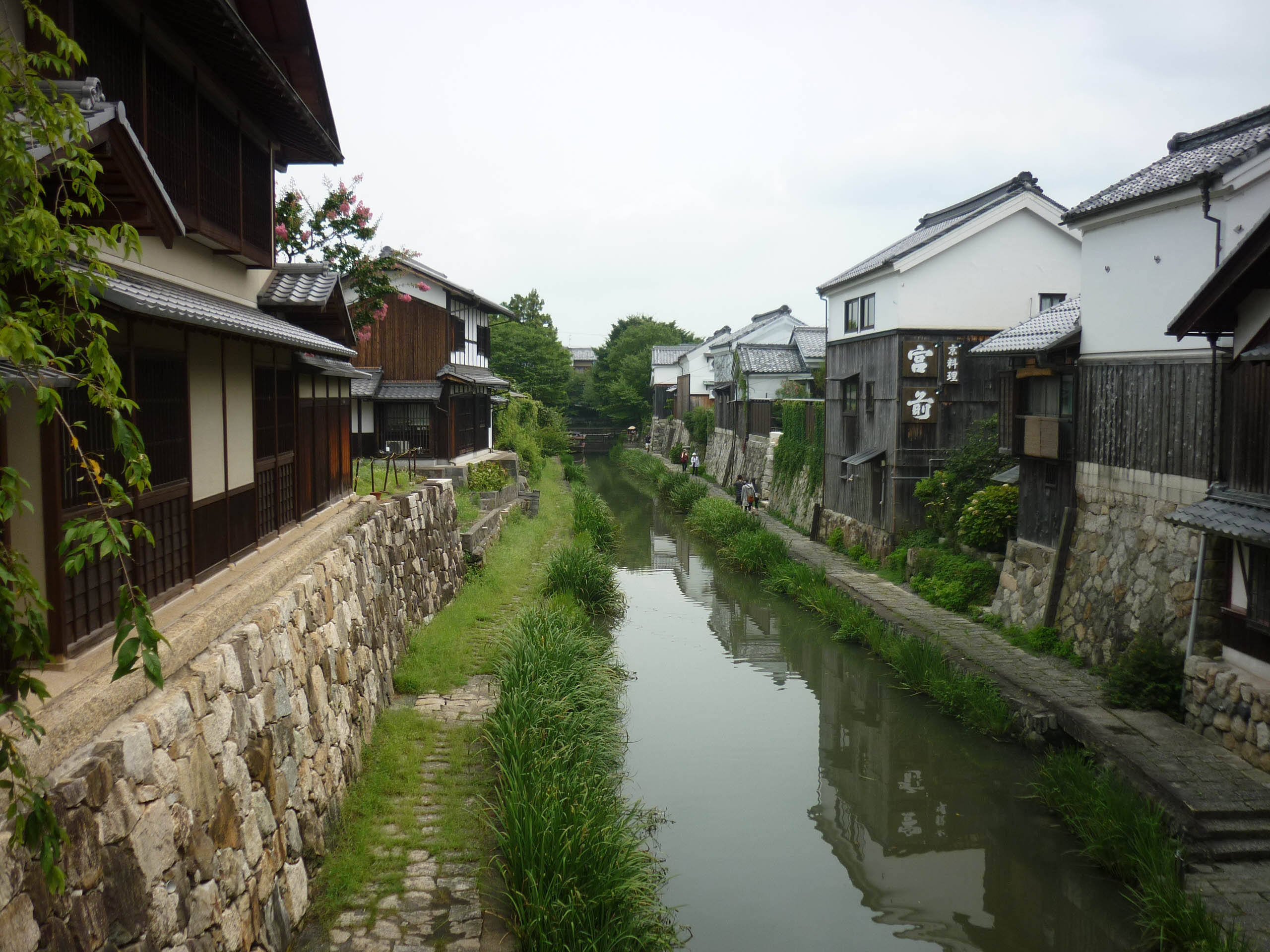
Wet moat of Hachiman

== Literature ==
- De Lange, William (2021). An Encyclopedia of Japanese Castles. Groningen: Toyo Press. pp. 600 pages. ISBN 978-9492722300.
