= Ōmihachiman =

Ōmihachiman 近江八幡市
- City
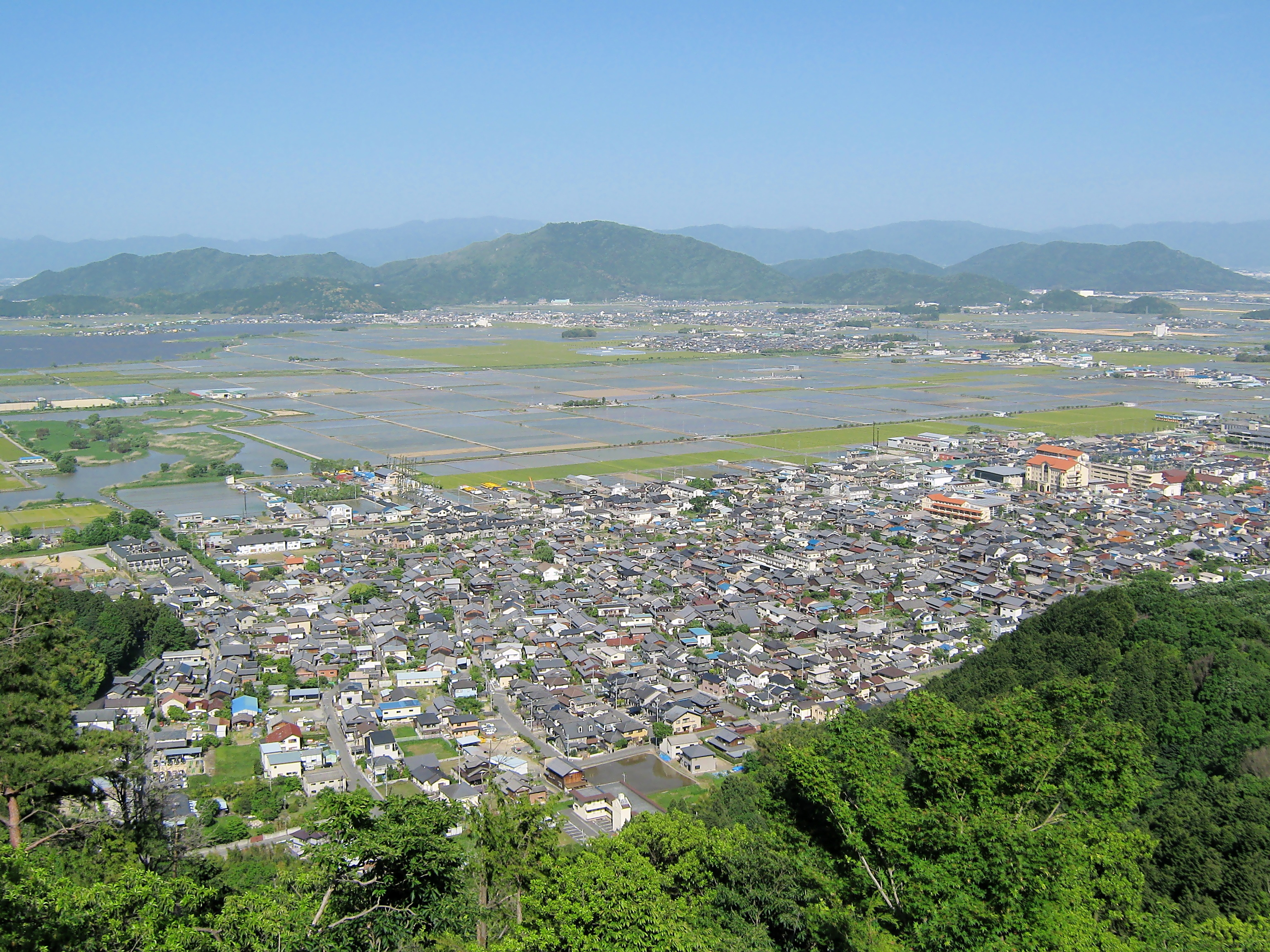
- Old city view from Mt. Hachiman

- Flag Seal

- Location of Ōmihachiman in Shiga Prefecture

- Location in Japan
- Coordinates: 35°07′42″N 136°5′53″E
- Country: Japan
- Region: Kansai
- Prefecture: Shiga Prefecture
- First official recorded: 131 AD (official)
- Hachiman of Shiga, town settled: April 1, 1889
- City settled: March 31, 1954

Government
  - Mayor: Hisashi Tokunaga (徳永久志) - from April 2026

Area
  - Total: 177.45 km^{2} (68.51 sq mi)

Population (31 August 2021)
  - Total: 82,233
  - Density: 463.42/km^{2} (1,200.2/sq mi)
- Time zone: UTC+09:00 (JST)
- City hall address: 236 Sakuragi-chō, Ōmihachiman-shi, Shiga-ken; 523-8501
- Phone number: 0748-33-3111
- Website: Official website
- Symbols
- Flower: Salvia
- Tree: Azalea, Sakura

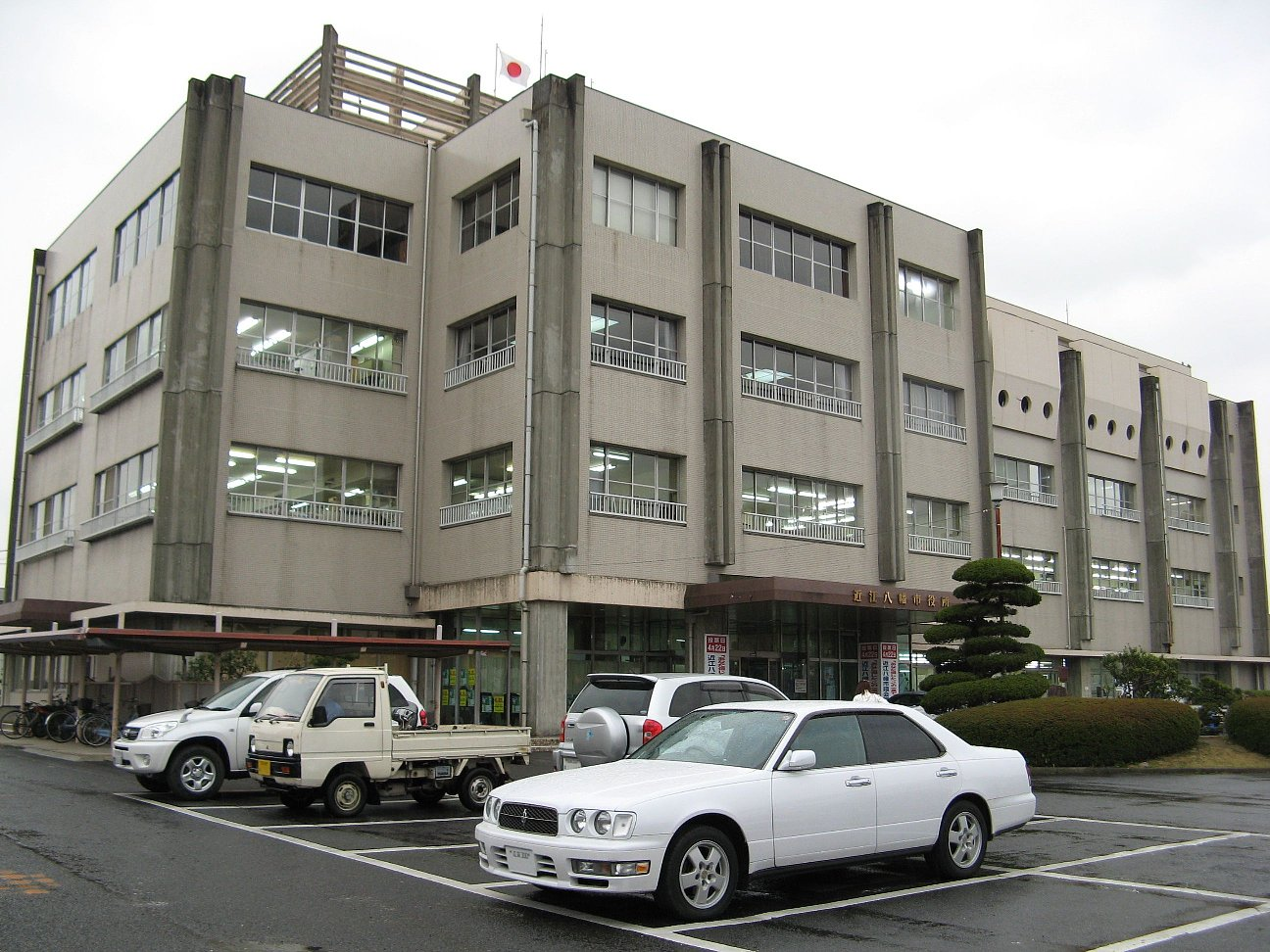
City Hall

Snowy evening in Ōmihachiman, 2022

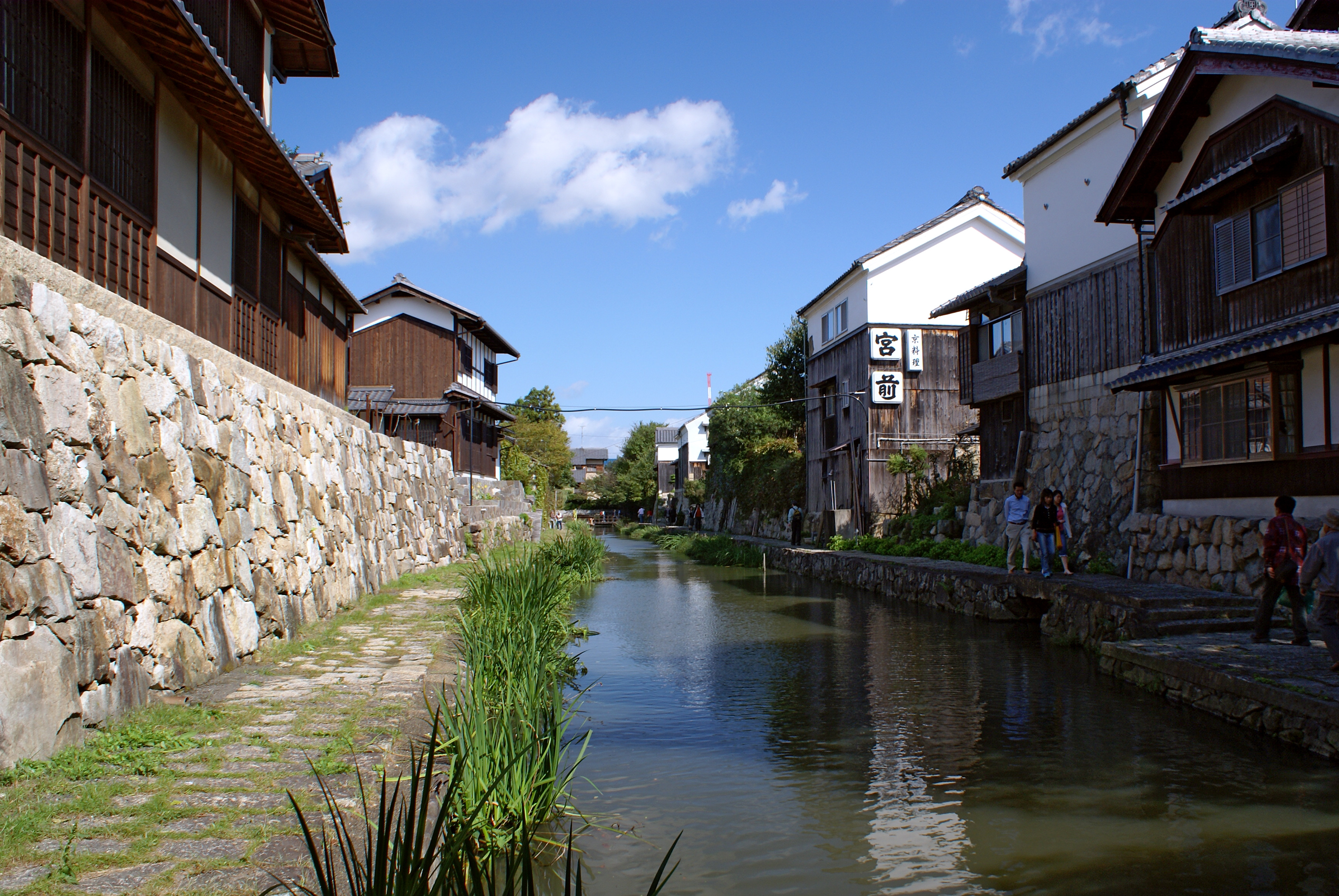
Traditional buildings Preservation Area

Ōmihachiman (近江八幡市, Ōmihachiman-shi; Japanese pronunciation: [ò̞ó̞.mʲí.hä́.c̟͡ɕí.mä̀ɴ̀, -mä́ɰ̃̀.ɕì, ó̞ó̞-]) is a city located in Shiga Prefecture, Japan. As of 31 August 2021, the city had an estimated population of 82,233 in 34747 households and a population density of 570 persons per km^{2}. The total area of the city is 76.97 square kilometres (29.72 sq mi).

== Geography ==
Ōmihachiman is located in central Shiga Prefecture, on flatlands along the eastern shore of Lake Biwa, and extending inland to the foothills of the Suzuka Mountains.

=== Neighboring municipalities ===
Shiga Prefecture

- Higashiōmi
- Ryūō
- Yasu

=== Climate ===
Ōmihachiman has a humid subtropical climate (Köppen Cfa) characterized by warm summers and cool winters with light to no snowfall. The average annual temperature in Ōmihachiman is 14.7 °C. The average annual rainfall is 1602 mm with September as the wettest month. The temperatures are highest on average in August, at around 26.6 °C, and lowest in January, at around 3.7 °C.

== Demographics ==
Per Japanese census data, the population of Ōmihachiman has recently plateaued after several decades of growth.

Historical population
Year	Pop.	±%
1950	54,461	—
1960	52,756	−3.1%
1970	52,171	−1.1%
1980	70,772	+35.7%
1990	77,730	+9.8%
2000	78,669	+1.2%
2010	81,738	+3.9%
2020	81,122	−0.8%

== History ==
Ōmihachiman is part of ancient Ōmi Province and was originally a post station that developed around Musa-juku on the Tōsandō (later the Nakasendō) highway connecting Heian-kyō with the eastern provinces. During the Sengoku period, the warlord Oda Nobunaga built Azuchi Castle in the hills on the border with Higashiōmi. Under Toyotomi Hidetsugu the center shifted to a castle town at the base of Hachimanyama Castle, which attracted many merchants ("Ōmi shōnin"), especially after the destruction of Azuchi Castle. Former merchant's residences and a canal used for transport are preserved in an old city area, designated a Preservation District for Groups of Traditional Buildings and an Important Cultural Landscape.

The town of Hachiman was established with Gamō District, Shiga with the creation of the modern municipalities system on April 1, 1889. In 1905, an American architect William Merrell Vories came to Ōmihachiman as an English language teacher at commercial high school. Two years later he resigned the original work, but he remained in Ōmihachiman and spent most of his productive life here. He handed down western-style buildings, a pharmaceutical company, an educational foundation and a hospital to the city. The town expanded by annexing the neighboring villages of Utsuro in 1933 and Shima in 1951. On March 31, 1954, Hachiman merged with the villages of Okayama, Kanada, Kirihara and Mabuchi to form the city of Ōmihachiman. The name was changed from "Hachiman" to "Ōmihachiman" to avoid confusion with the then existing city of Yahata in Fukuoka Prefecture, as both "Hachiman" and "Yawata" are written in the same kanji characters. On March 21, 2010, the town of Azuchi was merged into Ōmihachiman.

== Government ==
Ōmihachiman has a mayor-council form of government with a directly elected mayor and a unicameral city council of 24 members. Ōmihachiman contributes three members to the Shiga Prefectural Assembly. In terms of national politics, the city is part of Shiga 2nd district of the lower house of the Diet of Japan, and is represented by Kenichiro Ueno.

== Economy ==
Agriculture, commercial fishing and seasonal tourism are major components of the economy of Ōmihachiman. The key industries of Ōmihachiman include the manufacturing of pharmaceuticals.

== Education ==
Ōmihachiman has 12 public elementary schools and four public middle schools operated by the city government and three high schools operated by the Shiga Prefectural Department of Education. The city also has one private elementary school, one private middle school and one private high school.

== Transportation ==
=== Railway ===
JR West – Biwako Line

- Azuchi - Ōmi-Hachiman - Shinohara

Ohmi Railway – Main Line

- Musa - Ōmi-Hachiman

=== Highway ===
- National Route 8
- National Route 421
- National Route 477

== Sister cities ==
Ōmihachiman is twinned with:

=== Within Japan ===
- (Japan) Fujinomiya, Shizuoka
- (Japan) Matsumae, Hokkaidō

=== Outside Japan ===
- Grand Rapids, Michigan, United States, friendship city since 1986
- Leavenworth, Kansas, United States, sister city since 1997
- Mantua, Lombardy, Italy, friendship city since 2005
- Miryang, Gyeongsangnam-do, South Korea, friendship city since 1994

== Places of interest ==
Hachiman area

- Dainaka Lake Minami Site, Yayoi period settlement trace, National Historic Site
- Himure Hachiman-gū - The largest shrine in Ōmihachiman and the origin of the city name "Hachiman".
  - Sagichō Festival - A fire festival in every March which is held in the old city area and the Himure Hachimangū.
- Hachimanyama Castle - Toyotomi Hidetsugu's castle. Hachimanyama Ropeway services between the mountaintop and Himure Hachimangū.
- Hachiman-bori canal
- Suigō meguri - In the northeast of the city central, sightseeing boats service through the rural lagoon.
- Kawara Museum
- Lake Biwa
  - Okishima - A fishing island which is the only inhabited lake island in Japan.
  - Isaki no Sao-tobi - A water festival in every August which tests men's courage to jump into the lake from the Isaki Temple.
- Musa-juku

Azuchi area

- Azuchi Castle, Special National Historic Site
- Azuchi-Hyōtanyama Kofun, National Historic Site
- Chōmei-ji, 31st temple of the Saigoku Kannon Pilgrimage (西国三十三箇所, Saigoku sanjūsankasho)
- Kannonji Castle ruins, National Historic Site
- Kannonshō-ji, 32nd temple of the Saigoku Kannon Pilgrimage (西国三十三箇所, Saigoku sanjūsankasho)
- Oiso Shrine, National Historic Site
- Yukinoyama Kofun, National Historic Site

== Notable people ==
- Kota Aoki, football player
- Rikako Yagi, fashion model and actress
- Takashi Inui, football player
- Yukiko Inui, artistic swimmer
- Tatsuo Kawabata, politician
- Kazuyo Matsui, actress
- Miku Tanabe, entertainer
- Rorochan_1999 (1999–2013) - Infamous suicide of 14-year-old girl during a livestream on 24 November 2013.
- Merrell Vories Hitotsuyanagi (1880–1964) - American, later Japanese Christian missionary-architect
