= Motateyama Station =

Railway station in Ōtsu, Shiga Prefecture, Japan

Motateyama Station もたて山駅
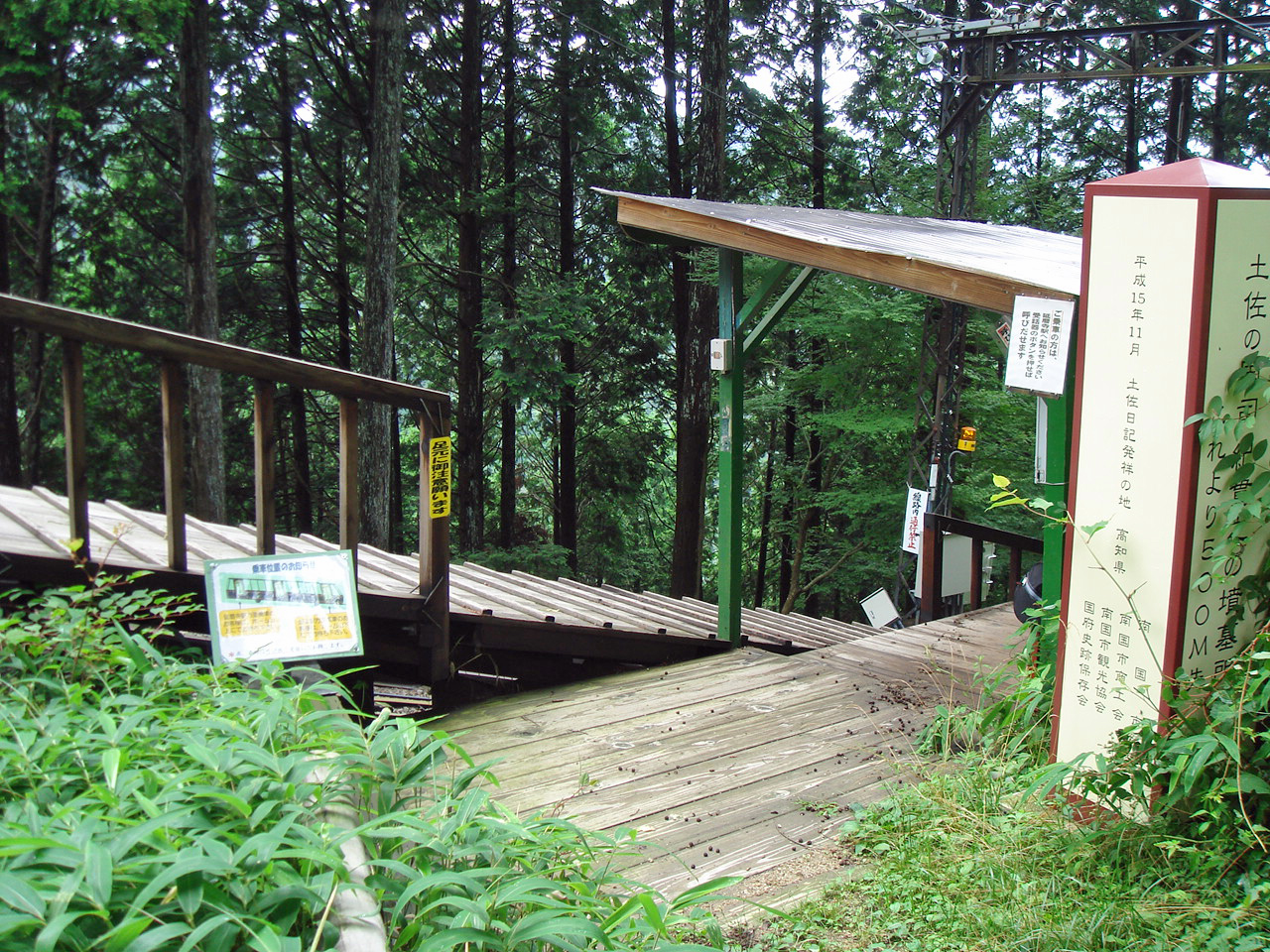
- Motateyama Station, July 2006

General information
- Location: Sakamotohonmachi, Ōtsu-shi, Shiga-ken 520-0116; Japan
- Coordinates: 35°4′3.1″N 135°50′52.6″E
- Operator: Hieizan Railway
- Line: Sakamoto Cable
- Distance: 1.7 km from Cable Sakamoto
- Platforms: 1 side platform

History
- Opened: 1949
- Former names: Motateyama Yuenchi eki (to 1974)
Location
- Location within Shiga Prefecture Location within Japan

Motateyama Station (もたて山駅, Motateyama-eki) is a funicular railway station located in the city of Ōtsu, Shiga Prefecture, Japan, operated by the private railway company Hieizan Railway.

It was opened as a way to access nearby campground (the former site of the Ohka launch pad). The campground has since closed.

== Lines ==
Motateyama Station is a station of the Sakamoto Cable, and is 1.7 kilometers from the terminus of the line at Cable Sakamoto. The train will stop only when it is notified in advance or when there is a call from the telephone installed at the station, and it usually passes.

== Station layout ==
The station consists of a single wooden side platform with no station building. There is a slope of 333 ‰ in the vicinity, but the platform is not stepped, and only non-slip cross timbers are struck on the board, which is slippery when wet. In the middle of the platform, there is a small shed and a bench that can seat 2 to 3 people.

== Adjacent stations ==
| « | Service | » |
Sakamoto Cable Line
| Hōraioka | - | Cable Enryakuji |

== History ==
Motateyama Station was opened in 1949 as Motateyama Yuenchi eki (裳立山遊園地駅). It was renamed January 15. 1974.

== Surrounding area ==
- Grave of Ki no Tsurayuki

== See also ==
- List of railway stations in Japan
