= Shiga Junior College =

Private junior college in Otsu, Shiga, Japan

Coordinates: 34°59′43.8″N 135°52′26.8″E

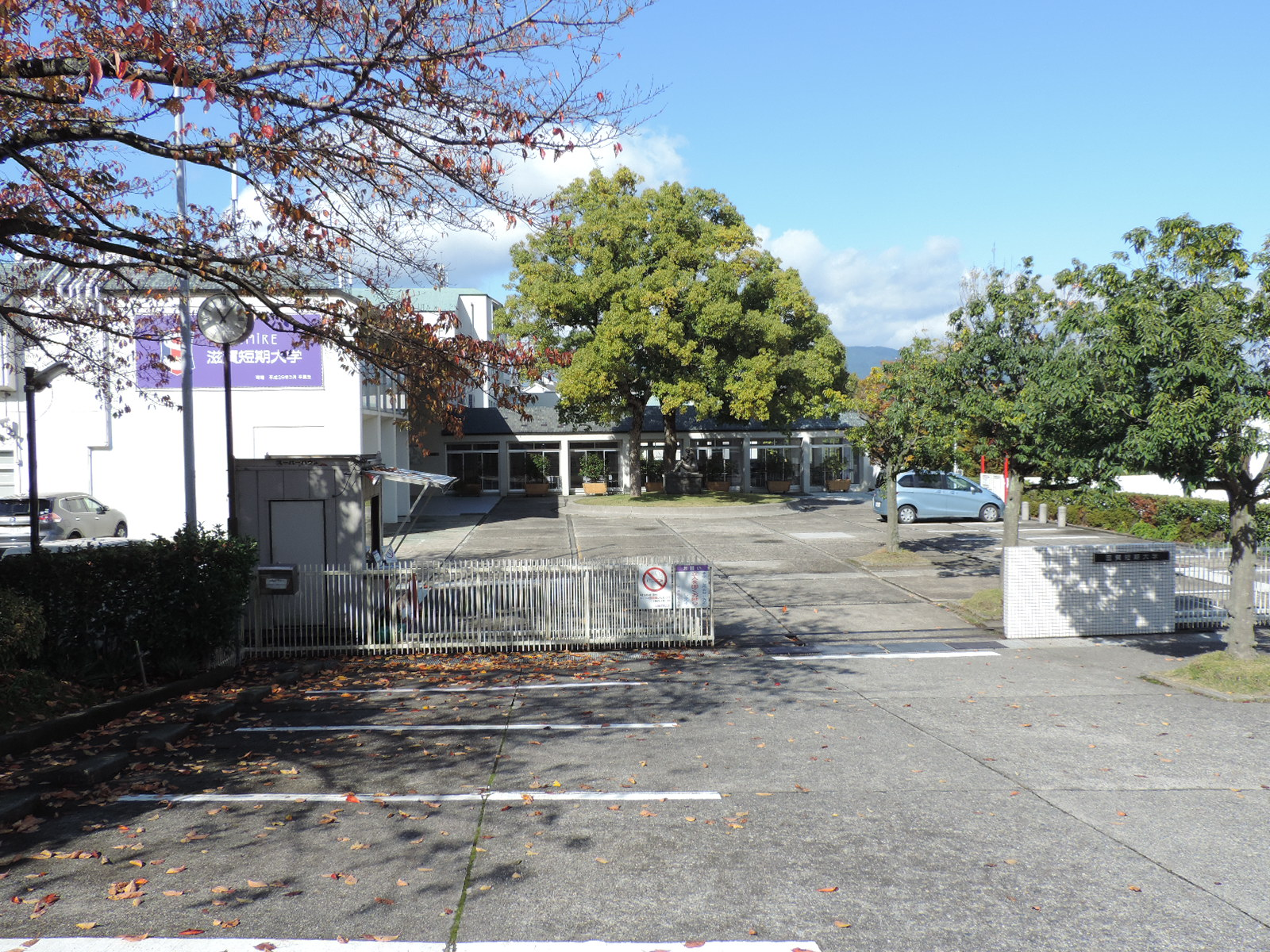
Shiga Junior College front gate

Shiga Junior College (滋賀短期大学, Shiga tanki daigaku) is a private junior college in Otsu, Shiga, Japan. Founded in 1970 as a junior women's college, it became coeducational in 2008.
