= Shiga Museum of Art =

Museum of art in Ōtsu, Shiga, Japan

- 滋賀県立美術館
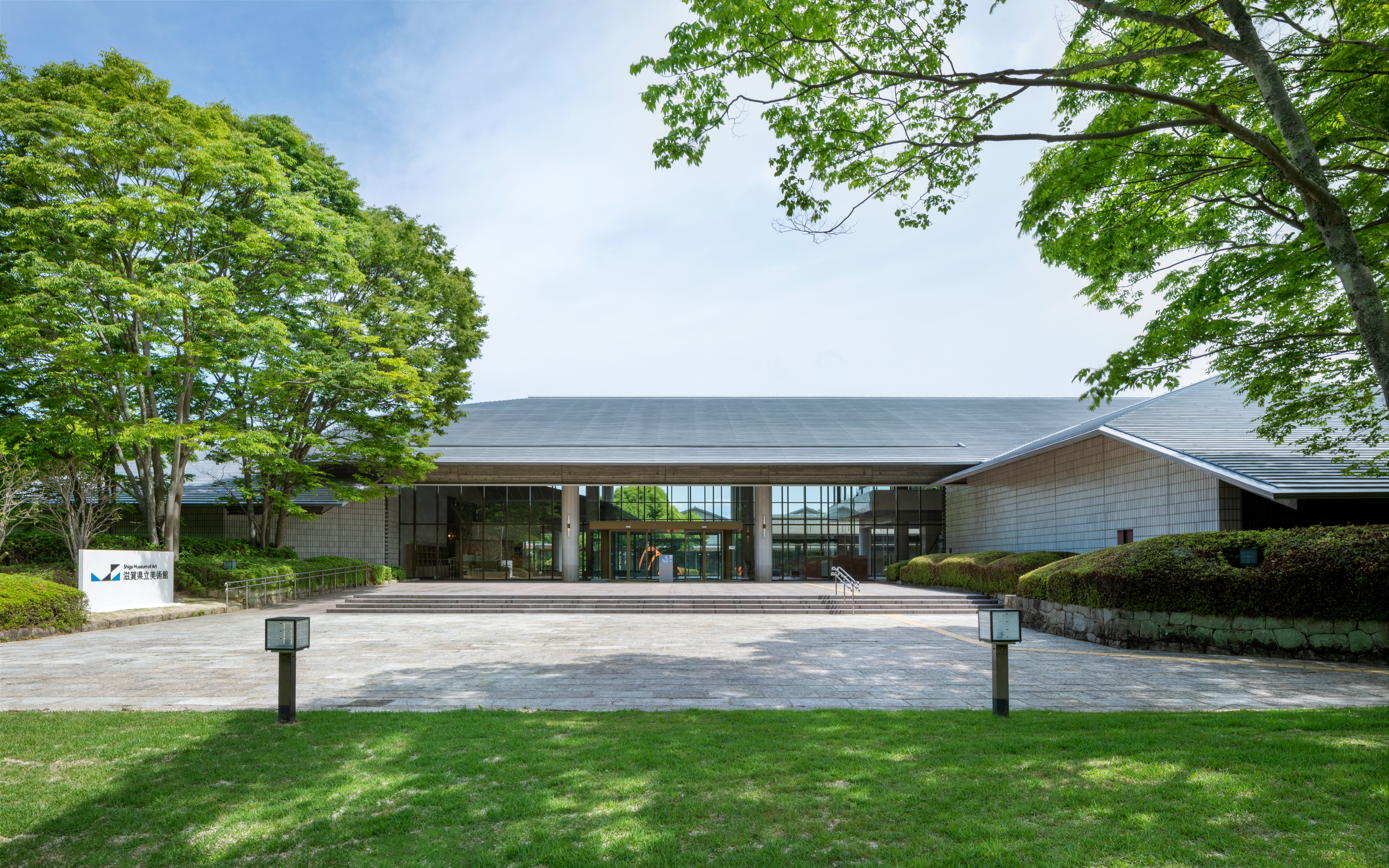
- Interactive map of the Shiga Museum of Art area

General information
- Location: 1740-1 Seta-Minamiōgaya-chō, Ōtsu, Shiga Prefecture, Japan
- Coordinates: 34°58′13″N 135°56′31″E
- Opened: 26 August 1984

Website
- Official website

Shiga Museum of Art (滋賀県立美術館, Shiga Kenritsu Bijutsukan) opened under the former name Museum of Modern Art, Shiga (滋賀県立近代美術館) in Ōtsu, Shiga Prefecture, Japan in 1984, changing its name to broaden its scope on 1 April 2021. As of 31 March 2024, the collection numbered some 2,589 works, including a Brâncuși Bird in Space, paintings by Rothko and Yukihiko Yasuda, and art brut.

== See also ==
- Ishiyama-dera
- Miho Museum
