= Shiga Prefectural Ishiyama High School =

Coordinates: 34°58′6.99″N 135°53′49.15″E

- 滋賀県立石山高等学校

Location
- 1-15-1 Kokubu; Ōtsu, Shiga; Japan

Information
- Type: Public secondary (Shiga prefectural)
- Motto: Independence and Autonomy ("自主・自律")
- Established: 1963
- Grades: 10-12 ("高1" - "高3")
- Nickname: Ishi-Kou ("石高")
- High School Code: 25107A
- Courses: Comprehensive Course ("普通科"), Musical Course ("音楽科")
- Website: http://www.ishiyama-h.shiga-ec.ed.jp

Shiga Prefectural Ishiyama High School (Japanese: 滋賀県立石山高等学校) is a senior high school located in Ōtsu, Shiga, Japan. It is called Ishi-Kou as a term of endearment by the locals.

There are two courses at the school: Comprehensive Course ("普通科") and Musical Course ("音楽科"). This is the only high school in Shiga, which has the Musical Course.

About 1000 students are enrolled, and more than the half of them are female.

The school motto is "Independence and Autonomy" ("自主・自律"). Students are expected to discipline themselves. Therefore, there has not been any school rule about students' clothes and hairstyles even though most of Japanese schools set such rules.

The school song was composed by Yasuhiko Murachi.

It is famous for sending many students into university. The percentage of the students going on to university was 58.4% in 2004; and it was the fourth highest in Shiga.

== History ==
- 1 April 1963 – Shiga Prefectural Ishiyama High School was founded in Nishino-chō, Ōtsu, where Shiga University had been.
- 1 April 1964 – It moved to Kokubu-chō, Ōtsu.
- 1 April 1968 – Musical Course was set up.

== Kokubu-Sai ==
The school festival, Kokubu-Sai ("石舞祭") is annually held. It is all managed by students. The name of the festival is derived from the school's address (Kokubu, Ōtsu); its kanji, nevertheless, is different.

At the festival, there are two parts: cultural festival and sports festival. Every year, the 10th-year students participate in exhibitions, the 11th-year students in dramas, and the 12th in booths in the cultural festival.

=== Themes ===
- 1994 – "Kansai Kokusai Kūkō"
- 1995 – (Unknown)
- 1996 – (Unknown)
- 1997 – (Unknown)
- 1998 – (Unknown)
- 1999 – (Unknown)
- 2000 – "The first and the last: On the honor of the biggest festival in Shiga"
- 2001 – "Infinite 2∞1"
- 2002 – "Bright trajectory: To go down in Kokubu's history"
- 2003 – "Calling smiles / ECO: Our revolution, resonate right now!"
- 2004 – "Buyūden: Legend with friends in Kokubu"
- 2005 – "Bushidō: Compeers of Kokubu, pioneer!!"
- 2006 – "Koku-Bridge"
- 2007 – "Aikoku-shin: Nine loves sworn for Kokubu"
- 2008 – "Incitement and stimulation"
- 2009 – (Unknown)
- 2010 – "KKB48, get crazy, the spirits of Kokubu"

=== International Relations ===
Foreign students visit the school festival every year.

== Facilities ==
- Main building
- Musical Course building
- Musical hall "Kosei"
- Small hall
- Library building
- Gymnasium
- Training hall
- Pool
- Club house
- Alumni House "Ishi-Kou Kaikan"
- House "Kokubu Kaikan"

== Clubs ==
=== Sports ===
- Kendo
- Soccer
- Mountain
- Judo
- Swimming
- Soft tennis
- Softball
- Artistic gymnastics
- Table tennis
- Basketball – Men's club won third prize in National Interscholastic Athletic Competition in 1981.
- Badminton
- Volleyball
- Fencing – It is a pioneering club in Shiga, and often participates in National Interscholastic Athletic Competitions.
- Baseball – It participated in Japanese High School Baseball Invitational Tournament in 1994.
- Rugby
- Track and field

=== Cultural ===
- Film
- English language
- Drama
- Science
- Choir
- Tea ceremony and Kado
- Social issues
- Photography
- Shodo
- Newspaper
- Wind-instrument music
- Art
- Literature
- Broadcasting

=== Semi-official ===
- Light music

== Access ==
- 20 min. from Ishiyama Station (JR Biwako Line)
- 10 min. from Ishiyamadera Station (Keihan Ishiyama Sakamoto Line)

== Graduates ==
- Setsuko Karasuma – Actress
- Tetsu – Comedian
- Satsuki Yukino – Voice actress
- Mitsuhiko Imamori – Photographer
