= Sakamoto Cable =

Funicular line in Ōtsu, Shiga, Japan

Coordinates: 35°3′59.5″N 135°51′21.9″E

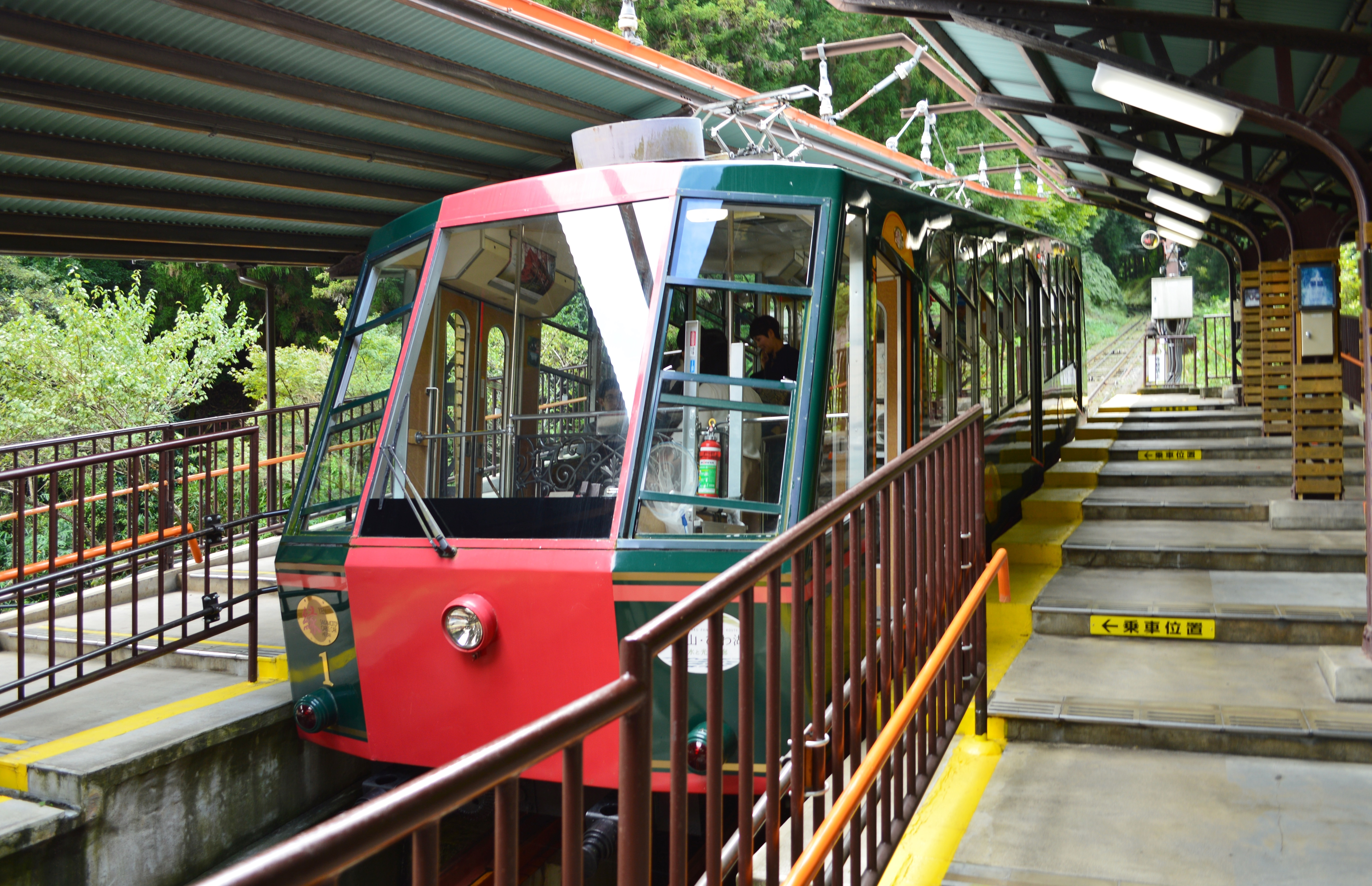
- Cable car at Cable Sakamoto Station in 2019

Overview
- Native name: 坂本ケーブル
- Locale: Ōtsu, Shiga Prefecture
- Stations: 4

Service
- Type: Funicular

Technical
- Line length: 2.0 km (1.2 mi)
- Track gauge: 1,067 mm (3 ft 6 in)

The Sakamoto Cable (坂本ケーブル, Sakamoto Kēburu), officially the Hieizan Railway Line (比叡山鉄道線, Hieizan Tetsudō-sen), is a Japanese funicular line in Ōtsu, Shiga. It is the only line Hieizan Railway (比叡山鉄道, Hieizan Tetsudō) operates. The line opened in 1927, as an eastern route to Enryaku-ji, a famous temple on Mount Hiei. This is the longest funicular line in Japan.

== Stations ==
Station Name	Distance between stations (km)	Distance from start (km)	Year opened
Cable Sakamoto ケーブル坂本	-	0.0	1927
Hōraioka ほうらい丘	0.3	0.3	1984
Motateyama もたて山	1.4	1.7	1949
Cable Enryakuji ケーブル延暦寺	0.3	2.0	1927

== See also ==
- Keifuku Cable Line – on the other side of the mountain
- List of funicular railways
- List of railway companies in Japan
- List of railway lines in Japan
