= Oiwake Station (Shiga) =

Railway station in Ōtsu, Shiga Prefecture, Japan

Oiwake Station 追分駅
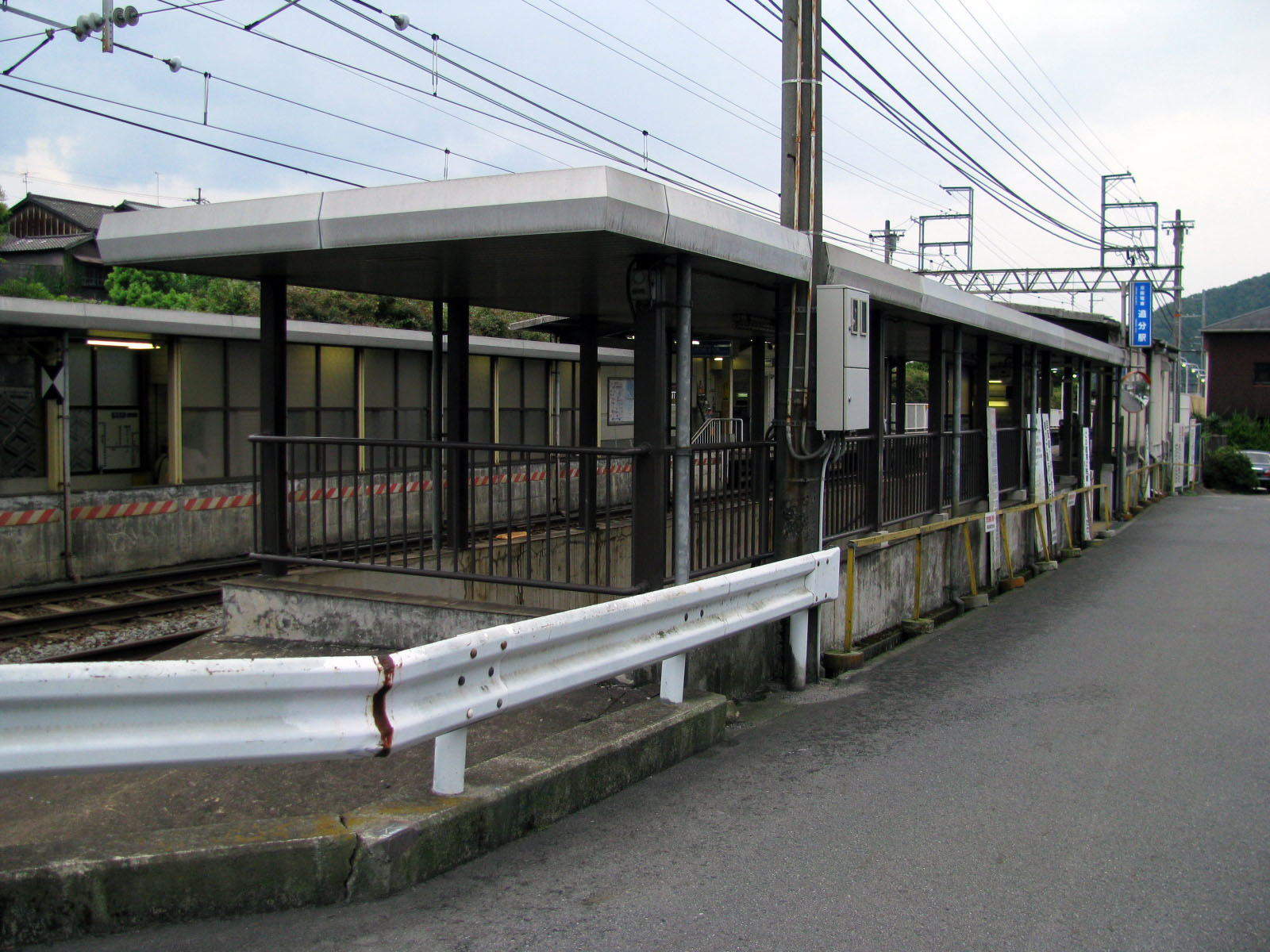
- Oiwake Station

General information
- Location: 6 Oiwakechō, Ōtsu-shi, Shiga-ken 520-0064; Japan
- Coordinates: 34°59′29.52″N 135°50′13.91″E
- Operator: Keihan Electric Railway
- Line: Keishin Line
- Distance: 3.4 km from Misasagi
- Platforms: 2 side platforms

Other information
- Station code: OT33
- Website: Official website

History
- Opened: August 15, 1912

Passengers
- FY2019: 899 daily

Services
Preceding station	Keihan Electric Railway	Following station
Shinomiya towards Misasagi	Keishin Line	Ōtani towards Biwako-hamaotsu
Location
- Location within Shiga Prefecture Location within Japan

Oiwake Station (追分駅, Oiwake-eki) is a passenger railway station located in the city of Ōtsu, Shiga Prefecture, Japan, operated by the private railway company Keihan Electric Railway.

== Lines ==
Oiwake Station is served by the Keihan Keishin Line, and is 3.4 kilometers from the starting point of the line at Misasagi.

== Station layout ==
The station consists of two opposed unnumbered side platforms connected by an underground passage. The station is unattended.

== Platforms ==
north	■ Keishin Line	for Biwako-Hamaōtsu, Ishiyamadera and Sakamoto-hieizanguchi
south	■ Keishin Line	for Yamashina

== History ==
Oiwaake Station was opened on August 15, 1912.

== Passenger statistics ==
In fiscal 2018, the station was used by an average of 899 passengers daily (boarding passengers only).

== Surrounding area ==
- Otsu Fujio Post Office
- Otsu City Fujio Elementary School
- Otsu City Fujio Civic Center

== See also ==
- List of railway stations in Japan
