= Tenson Shrine =

Shinto shrine in Shiga Prefecture, Japan

The Tenson Shrine (天孫神社, Tenson Jinja)
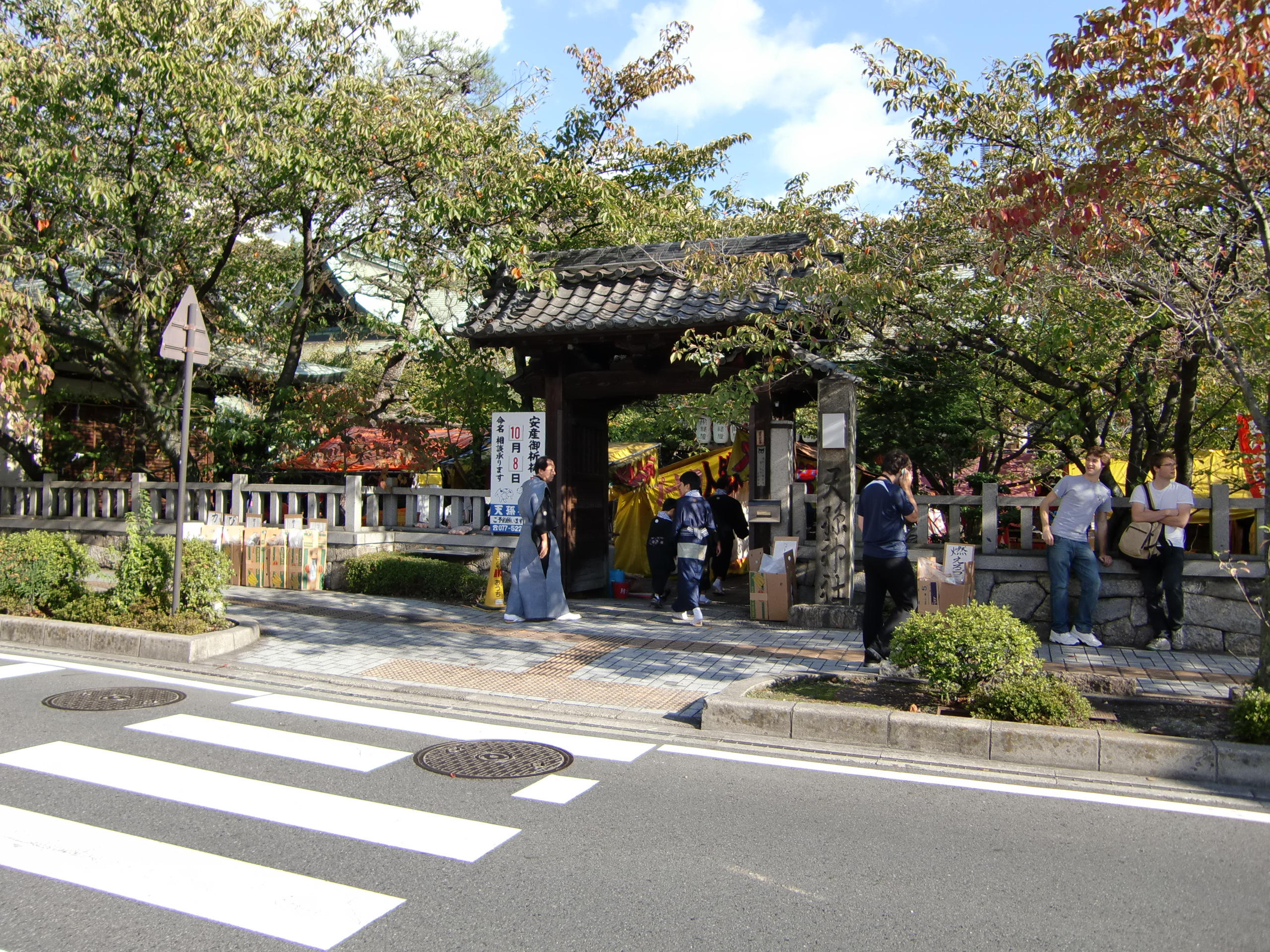
- Entrance to the shrine

- Location within Japan

Religion
- Affiliation: Shinto

Location
- Interactive map of The Tenson Shrine (天孫神社, Tenson Jinja)
- Coordinates: 35.0057°N 135.867°E

Architecture
- Established: 782

The Tenson Shrine (天孫神社, Tenson Jinja) is a Shinto shrine located in Ōtsu, Shiga, Japan.

== Enshrined gods ==
- Hikohohodemi
- Ōnamuchi
- Kunitokotachi
- Tarashinakatsuhiko

== History ==
The Tenson Shrine was established in 782 and purified by Emperor Heizei in 806.
