= Cable Enryakuji Station =

Railway station in Ōtsu, Shiga Prefecture, Japan

Cable Enryakuji Station ケーブル延暦寺駅
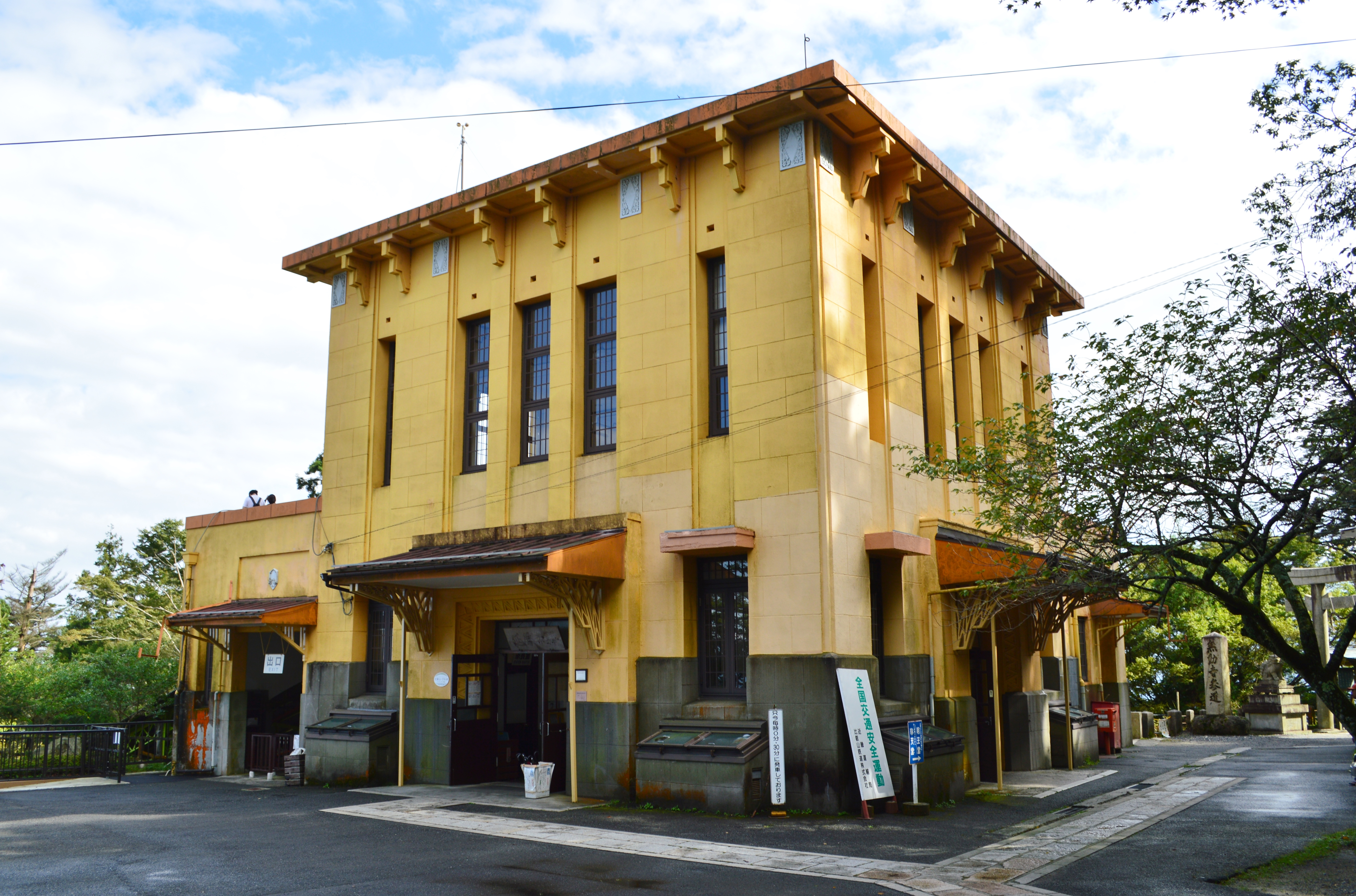
- Cable Enryakuji Station, September 2019

General information
- Location: Sakamotohonmachi, Ōtsu-shi, Shiga-ken 520-0116; Japan
- Coordinates: 35.066536°N 135.843887°E
- Operator: Hieizan Railway
- Line: Sakamoto Cable
- Distance: 2.0 km from Cable Sakamoto
- Platforms: 1 bay platform

History
- Opened: March 15, 1927
- Former names: Eizan Chūdō-eki (to 1974)
Location
- Location within Shiga Prefecture Location within Japan

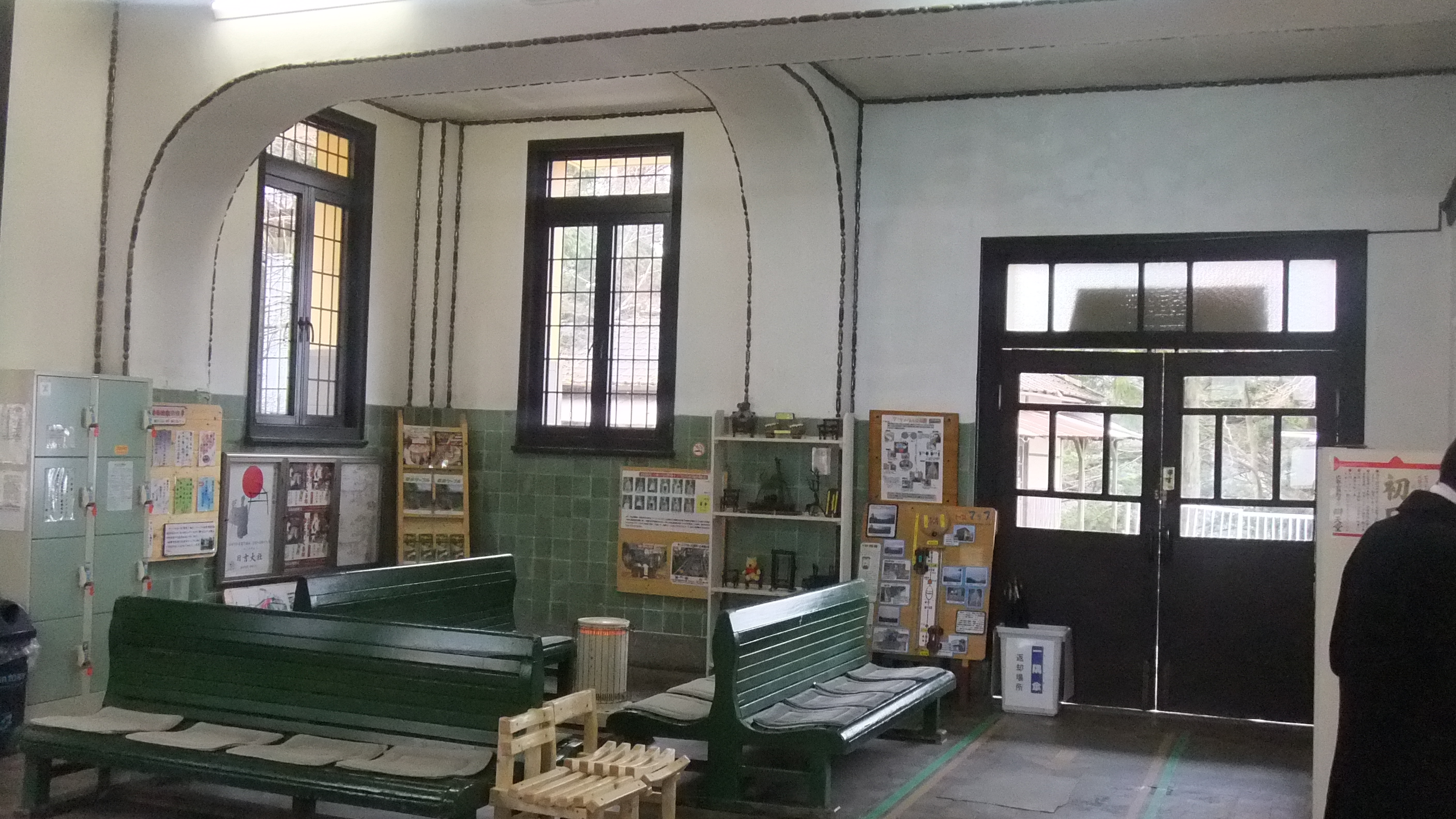
Inside the Station

Cable Enryakuji Station (ケーブル延暦寺駅, Kēburu Enryakuji-eki) is a funicular railway station located in the city of Ōtsu, Shiga Prefecture, Japan, operated by the private railway company Hieizan Railway.

== Lines ==
Cable Enryakuji Station is the upper terminus of the Sakamoto Cable, and is 2.0 kilometers from the lower terminus of the line at Cable Sakamoto.

== Station layout ==
The station consists of a single bay platform, and when it is crowded, the doors on both sides of the train may be opened to drop passengers. The station building was built in 1925 and is a two-story Western-style structure with a ticket office, a waiting room, operator room, and a crew waiting room on the first floor. There used to be a guest room on the second floor, but now it is open to the public as a gallery, and observation terrace. The station building received protection by the national government as a Registered Tangible Cultural Property in 2017.

== Adjacent stations ==
«	Service	»
Sakamoto Cable Line
Motateyama	-	Terminus

== History ==
Cable Enryakuji Station was opened on March 15, 1927, as Eizan Chūdō-eki (叡山中堂駅). Operation were suspended from March 19, 1945, to Augusts 7, 1946. The station was renamed January 15, 1974.

== Surrounding area ==
- Enryaku-ji
- Mount Hiei

== See also ==
- List of railway stations in Japan
