= Kita-Komatsu Station =

Railway station in Ōtsu, Shiga Prefecture, Japan

Kita-Komatsu Station 北小松駅
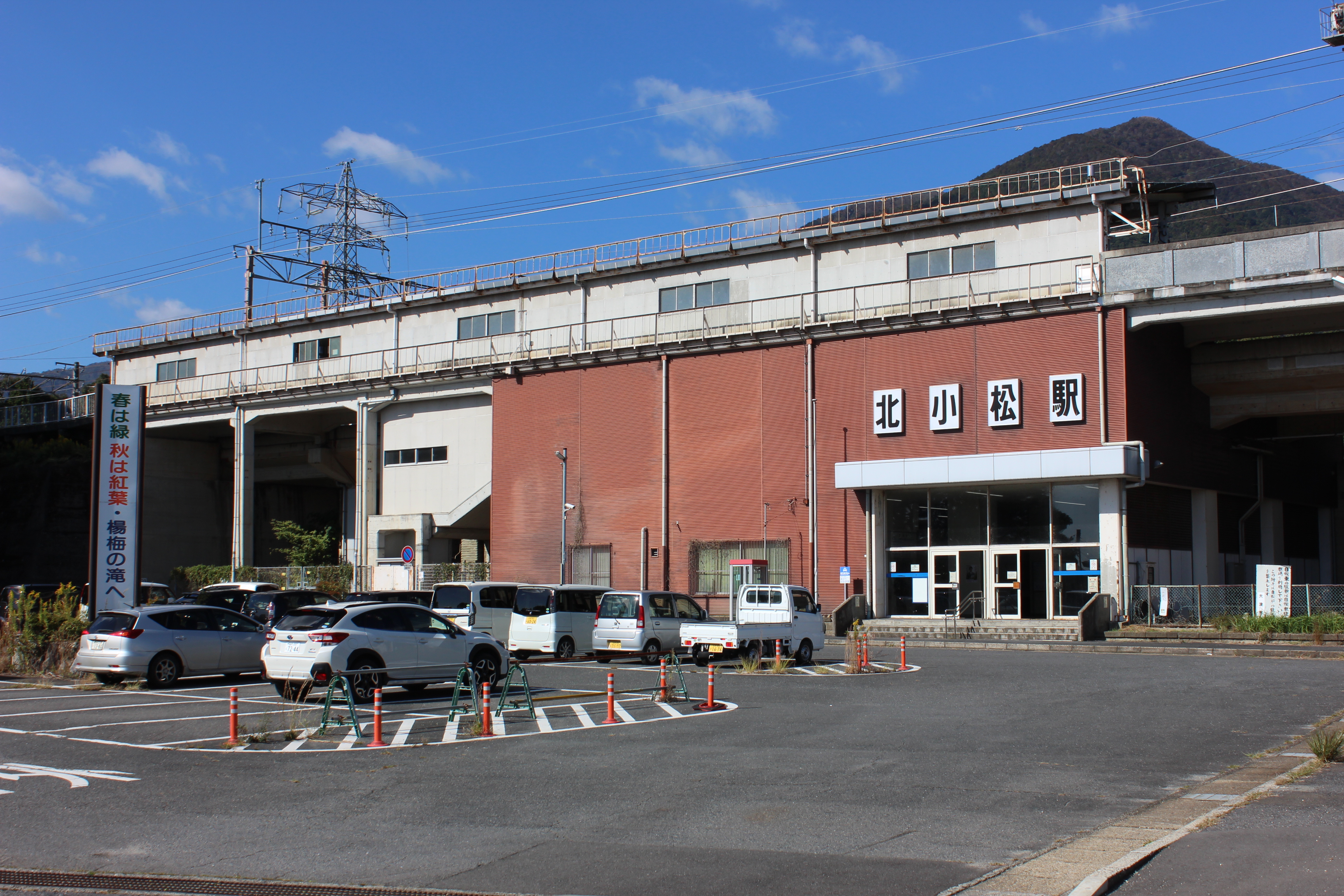
- Kita-Komatsu Station

General information
- Location: 743-4 Kita-Komatsu, Ōtsu-shi, Shiga-ken 520-0501; Japan
- Coordinates: 35.2534°N 135.9701°E
- Operator: JR West
- Line: Kosei Line
- Distance: 34.5 km from Yamashina
- Platforms: 2 side platforms
- Tracks: 2
- Connections: Bus stop

Construction
- Structure type: Elevated
- Accessible: None

Other information
- Station code: JR-B18
- Website: Official website

History
- Opened: 20 July 1974

Passengers
- FY 2023: 502 daily

Services
Preceding station	JR West	Following station
Omi-Maiko towards Kyoto	Kosei Line Local Rapid Special Rapid	Omi-Takashima towards Tsuruga
Location
- Location within Shiga Prefecture Location within Japan

Kita-Komatsu Station (北小松駅, Kita-Komatsu-eki) is a passenger railway station located in the city of Ōtsu, Shiga Prefecture, Japan, operated by the West Japan Railway Company (JR West).

== Lines ==
Kita-Komatsu Station is served by the Kosei Line, and is 34.5 kilometres (21.4 miles) from the starting point of the line at Yamashina and 40.0 kilometres (24.9 miles) from Kyoto.

== Station layout ==
The station consists of two opposed elevated side platforms with the station building underneath. The station is staffed.

== Platforms ==
1	■ Kosei Line	for Ōmi-Imazu and Tsuruga
2	■ Kosei Line	for Katata and Kyoto

== History ==
The station opened on 20 July 1974 as a station on the Japan National Railway (JNR). The station became part of the West Japan Railway Company on 1 April 1987 due to the privatization and dissolution of the JNR.

Station numbering was introduced in March 2018 with Kita-Komatsu being assigned station number JR-B18.

== Passenger statistics ==
In fiscal 2019, the station was used by an average of 361 passengers daily (boarding passengers only).

== Surrounding area ==
- Otsu City Komatsu Civic Center
- Shiga Komatsu Post Office
- Kitakomatsu Swimming Pool
- Yobai Falls

== See also ==
- List of railway stations in Japan
