= Nakanoshō Station =

Railway station in Ōtsu, Shiga Prefecture, Japan

Coordinates: 34°59′29″N 135°53′30″E

Nakanoshō Station 中ノ庄駅
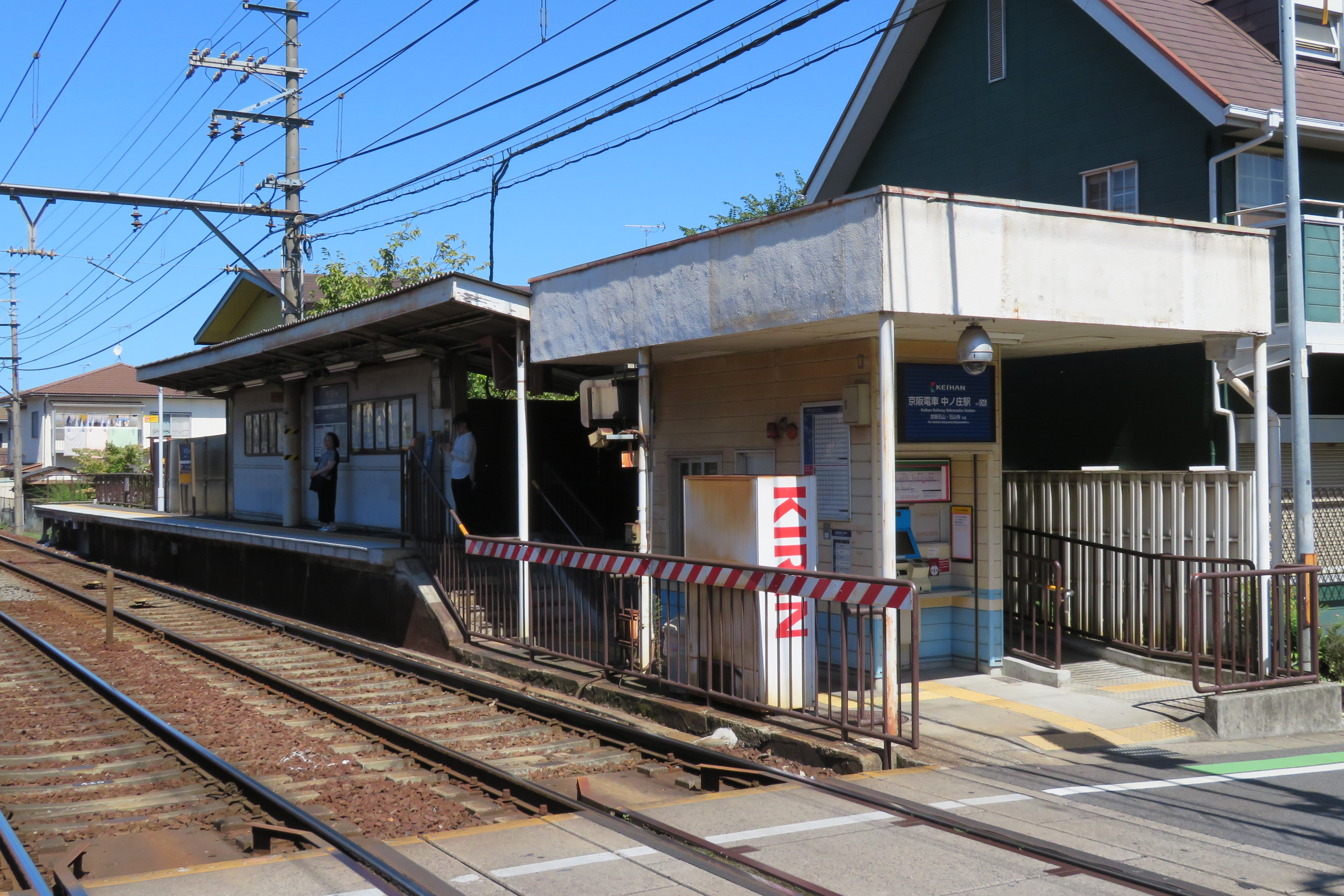
- Nakanoshō Station, September 2019

General information
- Location: Nakashō 1-chome, Ōtsu-shi, Shiga-ken 520-0837; Japan
- Operator: Keihan Electric Railway
- Line: Ishiyama Sakamoto Line
- Distance: 3.3 km from Ishiyamadera
- Platforms: 2 side platforms

Other information
- Station code: OT06
- Website: Official website

History
- Opened: March 1, 1913

Passengers
- FY2018: 874 daily (boarding)

Services
Preceding station	Keihan Electric Railway	Following station
Kawaragahama towards Ishiyamadera	Ishiyama Sakamoto Line	Zezehommachi towards Sakamoto-hieizanguchi
Location
- Location within Shiga Prefecture Location within Japan

Nakanoshō Station (中ノ庄駅, Nakanoshō-eki) is a passenger railway station located in the city of Ōtsu, Shiga Prefecture, Japan, operated by the private railway company Keihan Electric Railway.

== Lines ==
Nakanoshō Station is a station of the Ishiyama Sakamoto Line, and is 3.3 kilometers from the terminus of the line at Ishiyamadera.

== Station layout ==
The station consists of two opposed unnumbered side platforms connected by a level crossing. The station is unattended.

== Platforms ==
Station side	■ Ishiyama Sakamoto Line	for Ishiyamadera
Opposite side	■ Ishiyama Sakamoto Line	for Biwako-Hamaōtsu and Sakamoto-hieizanguchi

== History ==
Nakanoshō Station was opened on May 1, 1913.

== Passenger statistics ==
In fiscal 2018, the station was used by an average of 874 passengers daily (boarding passengers only).

== Surrounding area ==
- Otsu City Zeze Elementary School
- Chausuyama Kofun

== See also ==
- List of railway stations in Japan
