= Ōmi-Maiko Station =

Railway station in Ōtsu, Shiga Prefecture, Japan

Ōmi-Maiko Station 近江舞子駅
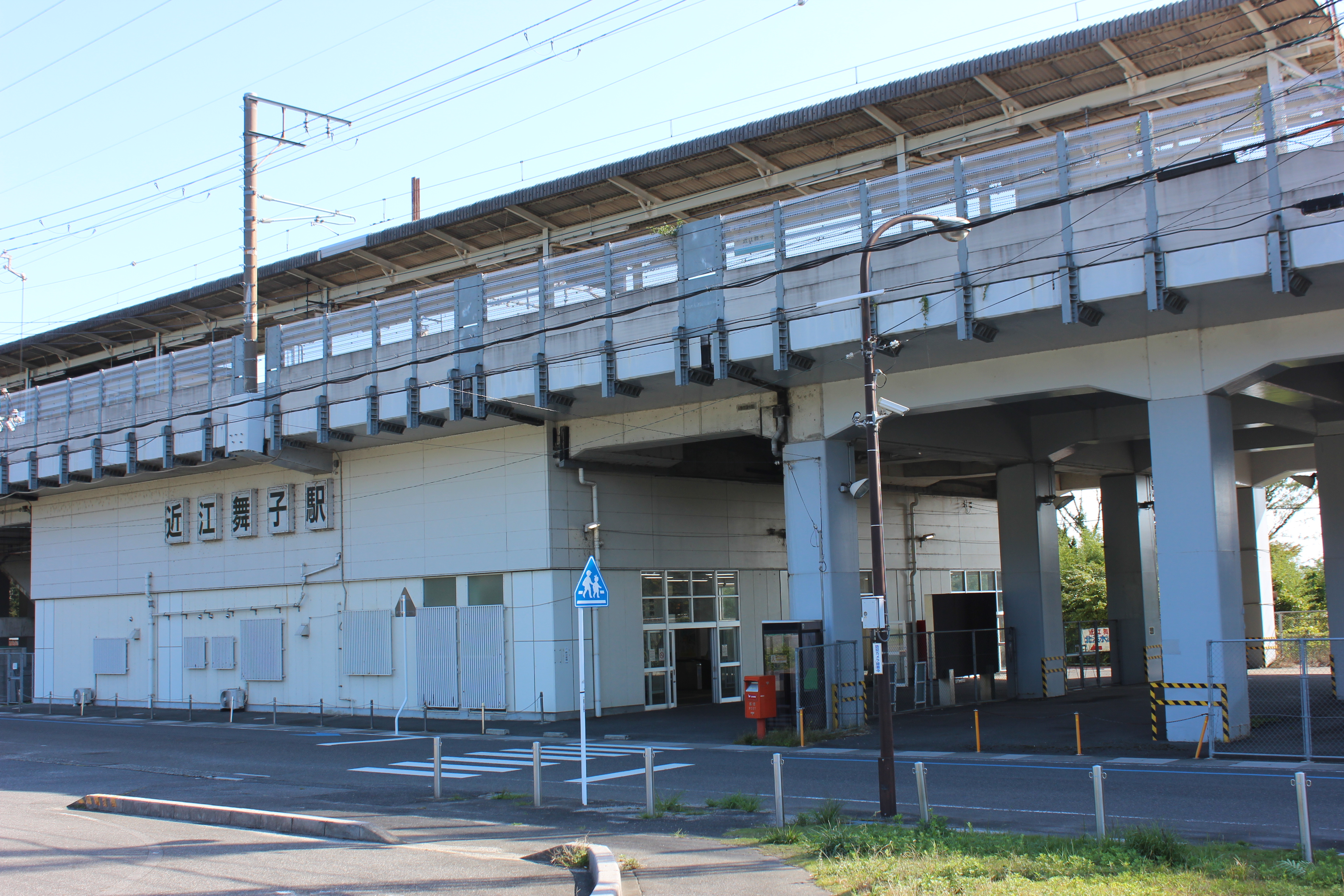
- Ōmi-Maiko Station

General information
- Location: Kaga 1109-8 Minami-Komatsu, Ōtsu-shi, Shiga-ken 520-0502; Japan
- Coordinates: 35.2364°N 135.9595°E
- Operator: JR West
- Line: Kosei Line
- Distance: 32.2 km from Yamashina
- Platforms: 2 side platforms
- Tracks: 4

Construction
- Structure type: Elevated
- Accessible: None

Other information
- Station code: JR-B19
- Website: Official website

History
- Opened: 20 July 1974

Passengers
- FY2023: 1,526 daily
Location
- Location within Shiga Prefecture Location within Japan

Ōmi-Maiko Station (近江舞子駅, Ōmi-Maiko-eki) is a passenger railway station located in the city of Ōtsu, Shiga Prefecture, Japan, operated by the West Japan Railway Company (JR West).

== Lines ==
Ōmi-Maiko Station is served by the Kosei Line, and is 32.2 kilometres (20.0 miles) from the starting point of the line at Yamashina and 37.7 kilometres (23.4 miles) from Kyoto.

== Station layout ==
The station consists of two opposed elevated side platforms with the station building underneath. The station is staffed.

== Platforms ==
1/2	■ Kosei Line	for Ōmi-Imazu and Tsuruga
3/4	■ Kosei Line	for Katata and Kyoto

== Adjacent Stations ==
«	Service	»
West Japan Railway Company Kosei Line
Hira	Local	Kita Komatsu
Katata	Rapid Service	Kita Komatsu
Katata	Special Rapid Service	Kita Komatsu

== History ==
The station opened on 20 July 1974 as a station on the Japan National Railway (JNR). The station became part of the West Japan Railway Company on 1 April 1987 due to the privatization and dissolution of the JNR.

Station numbering was introduced in March 2018 with Ōmi-Maiko being assigned station number JR-B19.

== Passenger statistics ==
In fiscal 2019, the station was used by an average of 754 passengers daily (boarding passengers only).

== Surrounding area ==
- Lake Biwa
- Omi Maiko Swimming Pool

== See also ==
- List of railway stations in Japan
