= Finnish School in Japan =

International school in Ōtsu, Japan

Coordinates: 34.9453°N 135.9526°E

- Japanin suomalainen koulu

Information
- Other name: 日本フィンランド学校
- Opened: 1964
- Closed: 2008
- Grades: 1-11 (originally); Kindergarten-6 (later)
- Enrollment: 43

Finnish School in Japan (Japanese: 日本フィンランド学校; Finnish: Japanin suomalainen koulu), nicknamed JASUKO, was a Finnish international school in Ōtsu, Shiga Prefecture, Japan. It served grades 1-11, and later Kindergarten-6.

== History ==
The Finnish Free Foreign Mission established the school, which was originally intended for the sons and daughters of Finnish missionaries. Jasuko opened the fall of 1964 in a church in Chausuyama. Other missionary organizations, including the Finnish Lutheran Mission (FLM), the Finnish Lutheran Overseas Mission (FLOM), and the Lutheran Evangelical Association of Finland (LEAF), joined the efforts to run the school. Parents and volunteers built a structure that the school used until 1987. The peak enrollment was 43 students, most of whom were boarding students, in the spring of 1987. That year a new classroom building and dormitory opened.

The school population declined as the number of missionaries decreased in the 1990s. The school closed when the missionary cooperation ceased in 2003. In 2006 the school reopened as a trilingual Japanese-Finnish-English school but it closed again in 2008.

Joona Kallio, a former student, designed a logo for the school's 50 year anniversary. The "5" appears like the Japanese hiragana "ち" and the colors used are those of the flag of Finland.
