= Gichū-ji =

Buddhist temple in Shiga Prefecture, Japan

- 義仲寺
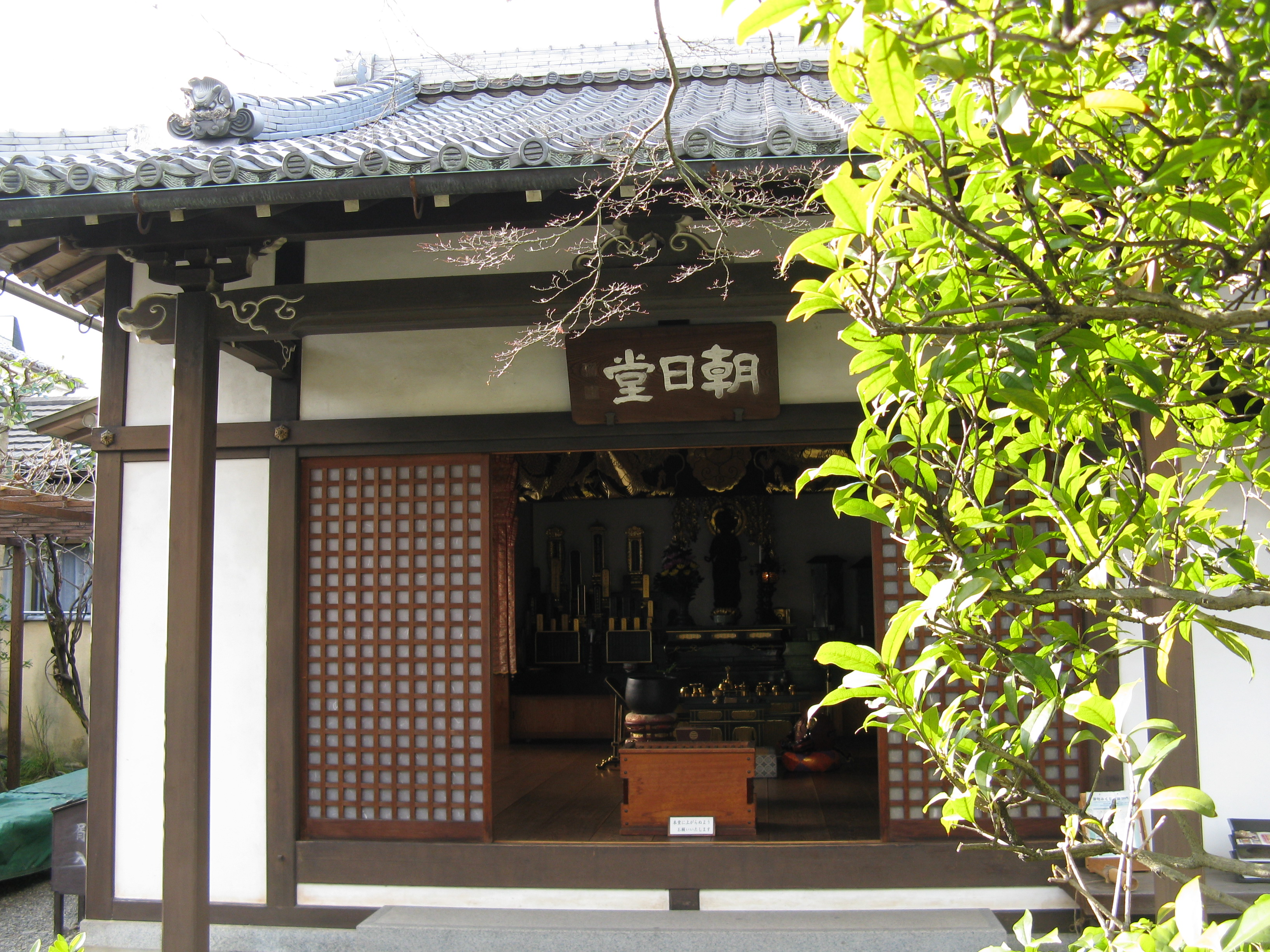
- Gichū-ji Main Hall

- Gichū-ji Gichū-ji (Japan)

Religion
- Affiliation: Buddhist
- Deity: Shō-Kannon Bosatsu
- Rite: Tendai

Location
- Location: 1-5-11 Baba, Ōtsu-shi, Shiga-ken
- Country: Japan
- Interactive map of Gichū-ji
- Coordinates: 35°00′11″N 135°52′48″E

Architecture
- Founder: unknown
- Completed: unknown

Gichū-ji (義仲寺) is a Tendai Buddhist temple in the Baba neighborhood of the city of Ōtsu, Shiga Prefecture, Japan. Its honzon is a statue of Shō-Kannon Bosatsu. It contains the grave of the late Heian period warlord Kiso Yoshinaka and the Edo period poet Matsuo Basho. Its precincts were designated a National Historic Site in 1967.

== History ==
The foundation or original name of this temple is unknown. The name of Gichū-ji is a kanbun pronunciation of the name "Yoshinaka". Kiso Yoshinaka was the cousin of Minamoto no Yoritomo and became a rival in the struggle to seize control of the country from the Taira clan in the Genpei War. He was killed at the Battle of Awazu in Ōmi Province (in what is now part of Ōtsu) and was buried in a mound planted with a Japanese persimmon near the battlefield. His consort, Tomoe Gozen was captured and taken to Kanagawa, where she was forced to marry one of Yoritomo's generals, Wada Yoshimori. She was the mother of Asahina Yoshihide. After the Wada clan was destroyed in a coup in 1203, she escaped to Fukumitsu, Toyama, where she became a nun. Her subsequent history is uncertain. She is said to have lived to the age of 91 years, and her grave is in what is now Nanto, Toyama, although other purported graves are located in Yokosuka, Kanagawa, Kiso, Nagano and Jōetsu, Niigata. Per the undocumented history of Gichū-ji, Tomoe Gozen came to this location after she had become a nun, and established a small hermitage which she named the "hermitage of the nameless woman", and lived at this location until her death. This hermitage became Gichū-ji and eventually a stone hōkyōintō monument was erected in place of the burial mound. The temple fell into ruin during the Muromachi period, but was revived by the shugo of Ōmi Province, Rokkaku Yoshikata in 1553, becoming a subsidiary for Mii-dera in the Edo period. The haiku master Matsuo Basho often stayed at this temple, and in his will, requested that his tomb be placed next to Yoshinaka's tomb after his death.

After the end of World War II, the temple was in danger of extinction, but it was purchased by a private philanthropist, who also established a foundation for its subsequent maintenance and upkeep.

== Gallery ==
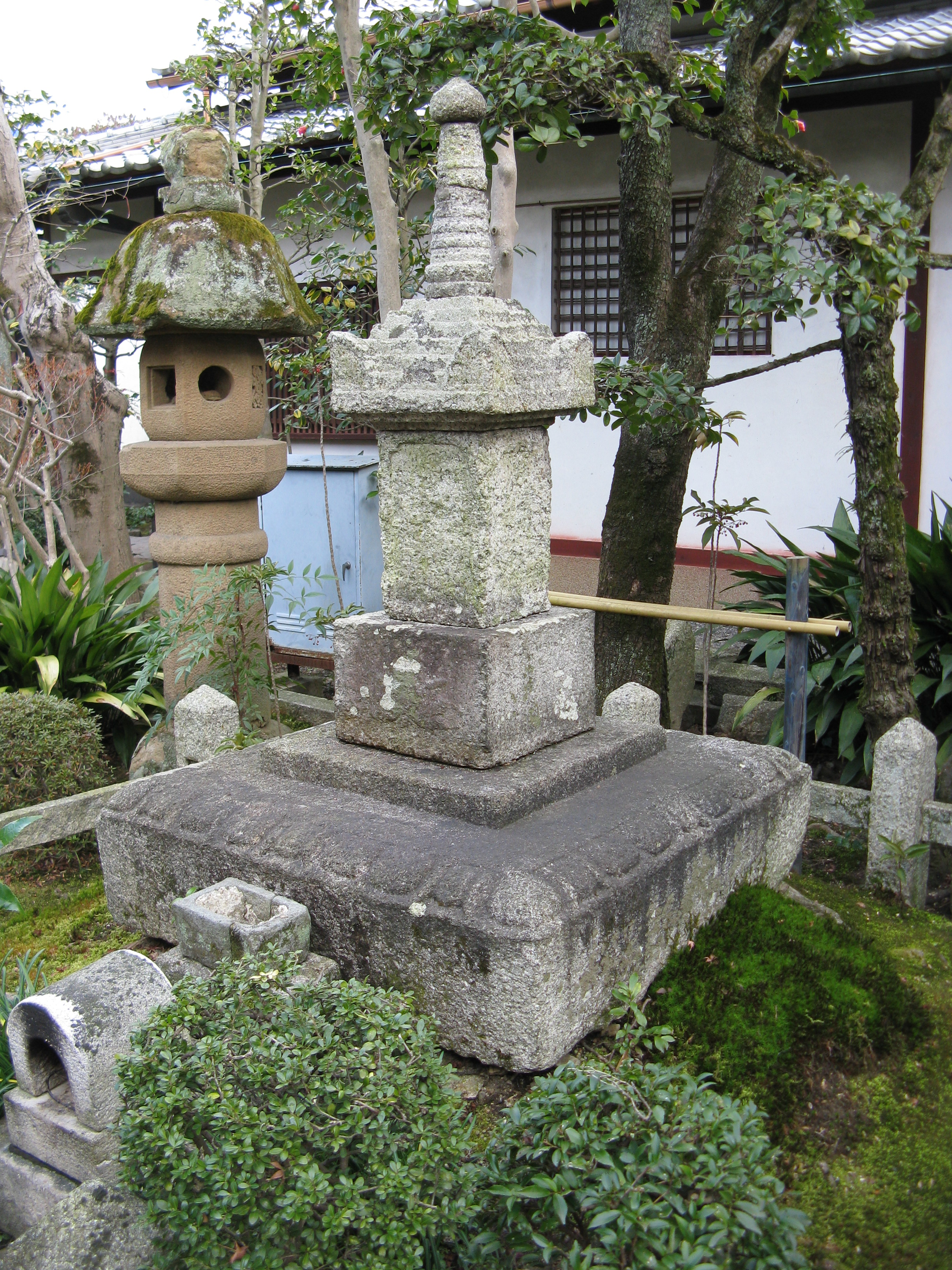
Grave of Kiso Yoshinaka

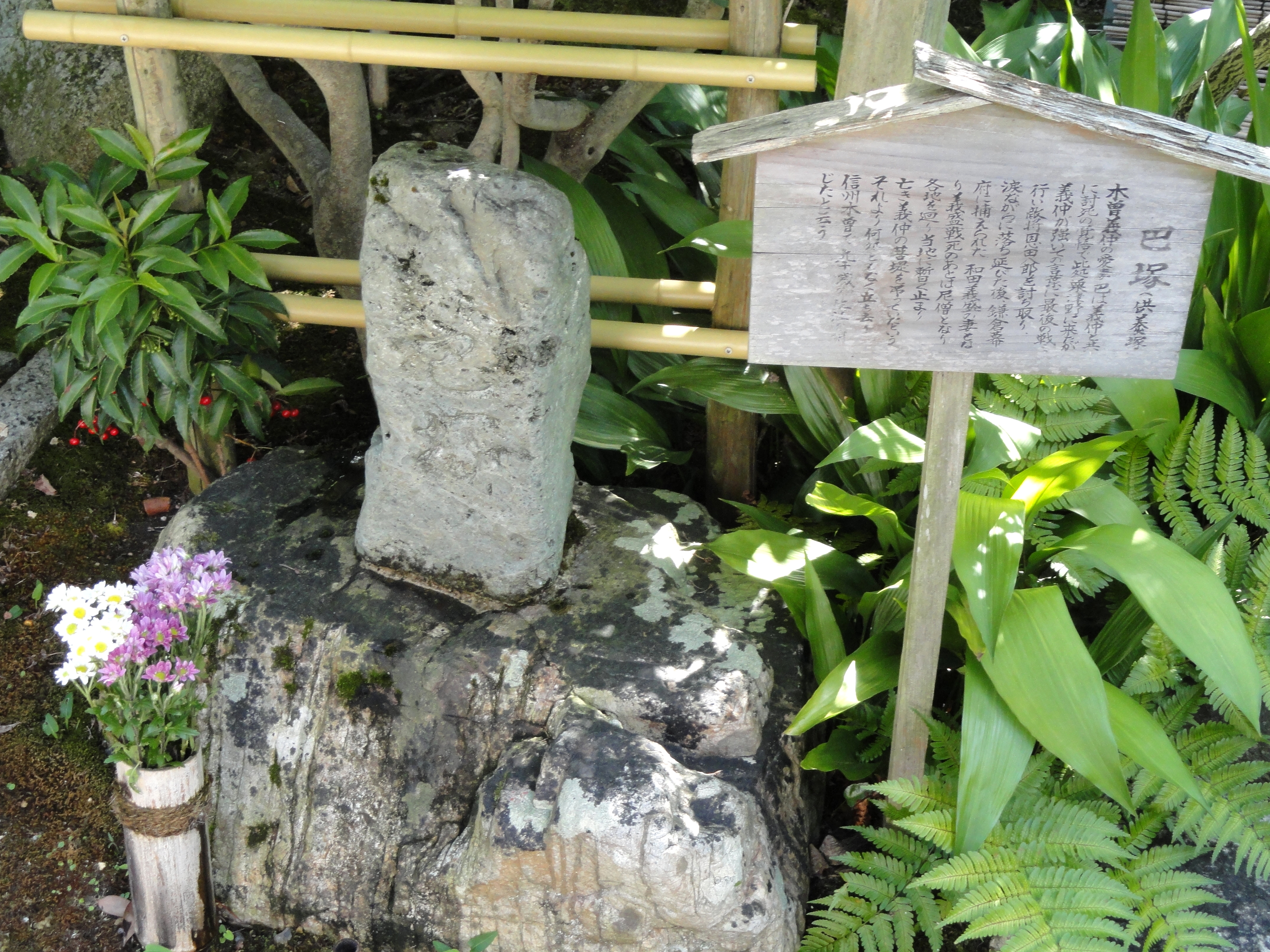
Grave of Tomoe Gozen

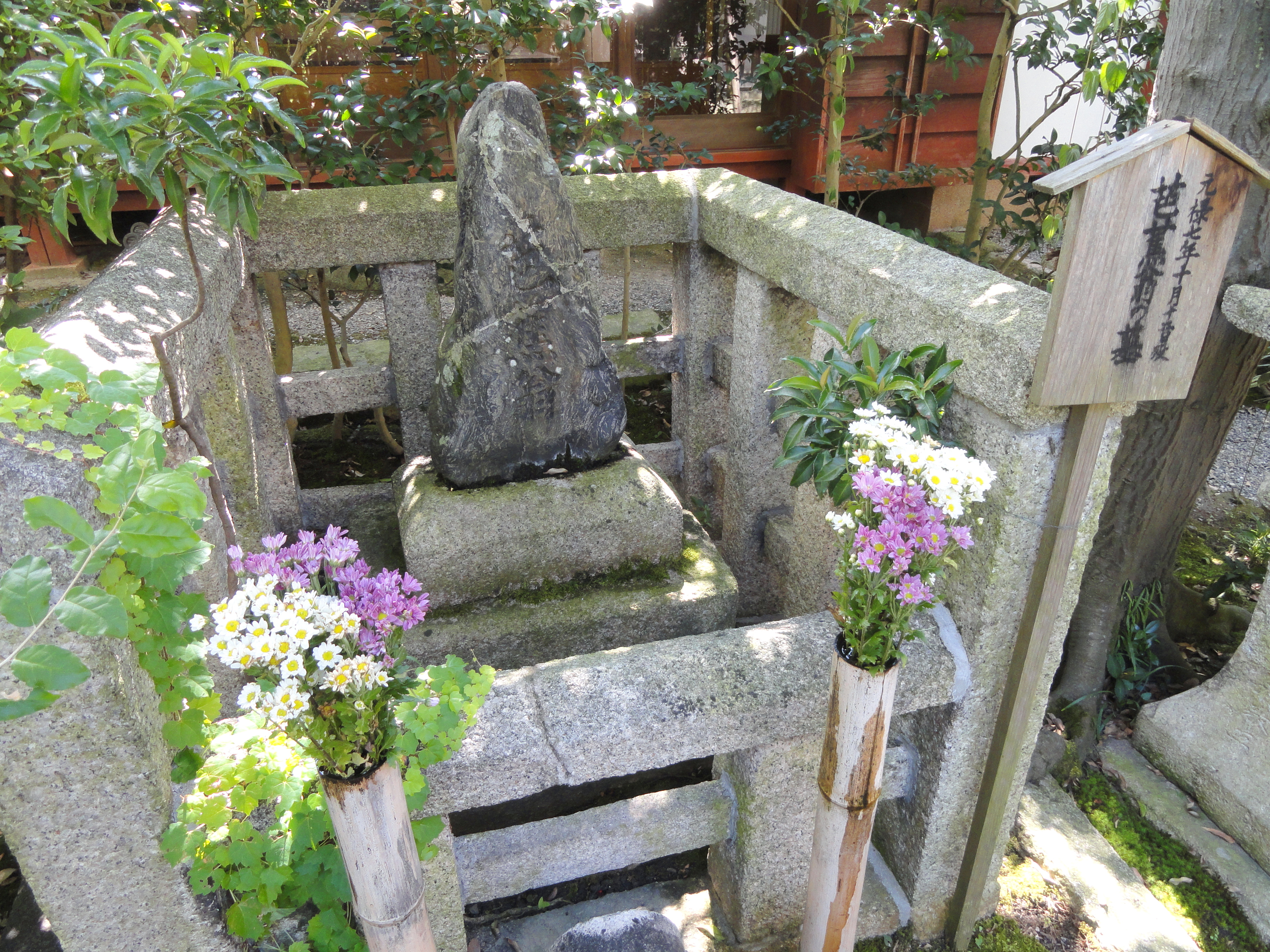
Grave of Matsuo Basho

The temple has a small museum with displays concerning Kiso Yoshinaka and Matsuo Bashō. The temple is a seven-minute walk from Zeze Station on the JR West Biwako Line or the Keihan Electric Railway Ishiyama Sakamoto Line.

== See also ==
- List of Historic Sites of Japan (Shiga)
