= Hōraioka Station =

Railway station in Ōtsu, Shiga Prefecture, Japan

Hōraioka Station ほうらい丘駅
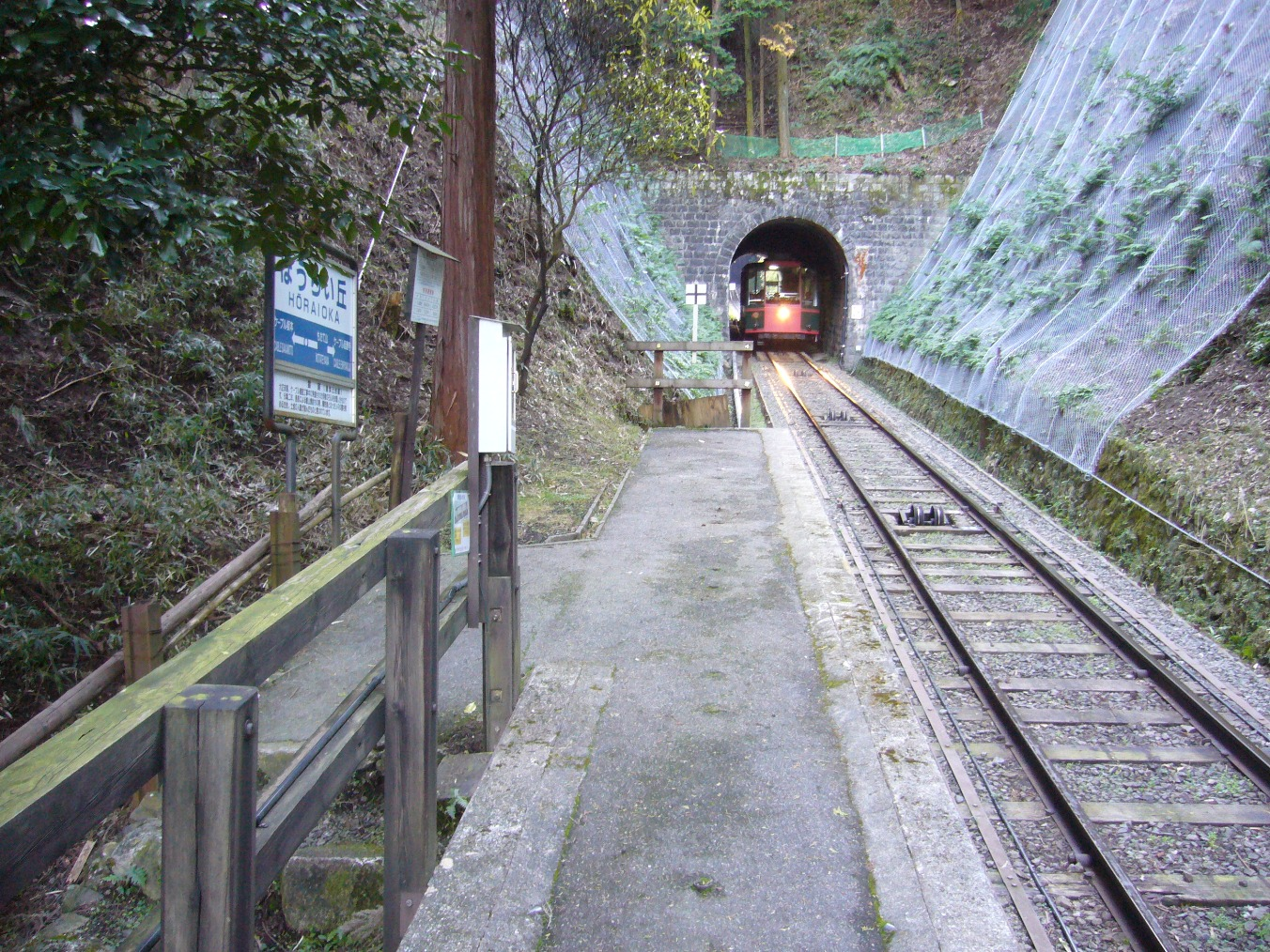
- Hōraioka Station, November 2007

General information
- Location: Sakamotohonmachi, Ōtsu-shi, Shiga-ken 520-0116; Japan
- Coordinates: 35°4′6.1″N 135°51′40.3″E
- Operator: Hieizan Railway
- Line: Sakamoto Cable
- Distance: 0.3 km from Cable Sakamoto
- Platforms: 1 side

History
- Opened: April 2, 1984
Location
- Location within Shiga Prefecture Location within Japan

Hōraioka Station (ほうらい丘駅, Hōraioka-eki) is a funicular railway station located in the city of Ōtsu, Shiga Prefecture, Japan, operated by the private railway company Hieizan Railway.

== Lines ==
Hōraioka Station is a station of the Sakamoto Cable, and is 0.3 kilometers from the terminus of the line at Cable Sakamoto. The train will stop only when it is notified in advance or when there is a call from the telephone installed at the station, and it usually passes.

== Station layout ==
The station consists of a single side platform with no station building. Due to the not-so-steep slope of 160 ‰ in the vicinity, the platform is sloped rather than stepped.

== Adjacent stations ==
«	Service	»
Sakamoto Cable Line
Cable Sakamoto	-	Motateyama

== History ==
Hōraioka Station was opened on April 2, 1984

== Surrounding area ==
The station is located in dense forest with no road access, as the mountain paths to the station are usually blocked by called trees and debris. On alighting at this station, passengers have no choice but to return to the next train.

== See also ==
- List of railway stations in Japan
