= Cable Sakamoto Station =

Railway station in Ōtsu, Shiga Prefecture, Japan

Cable Sakamoto Station ケーブル坂本駅
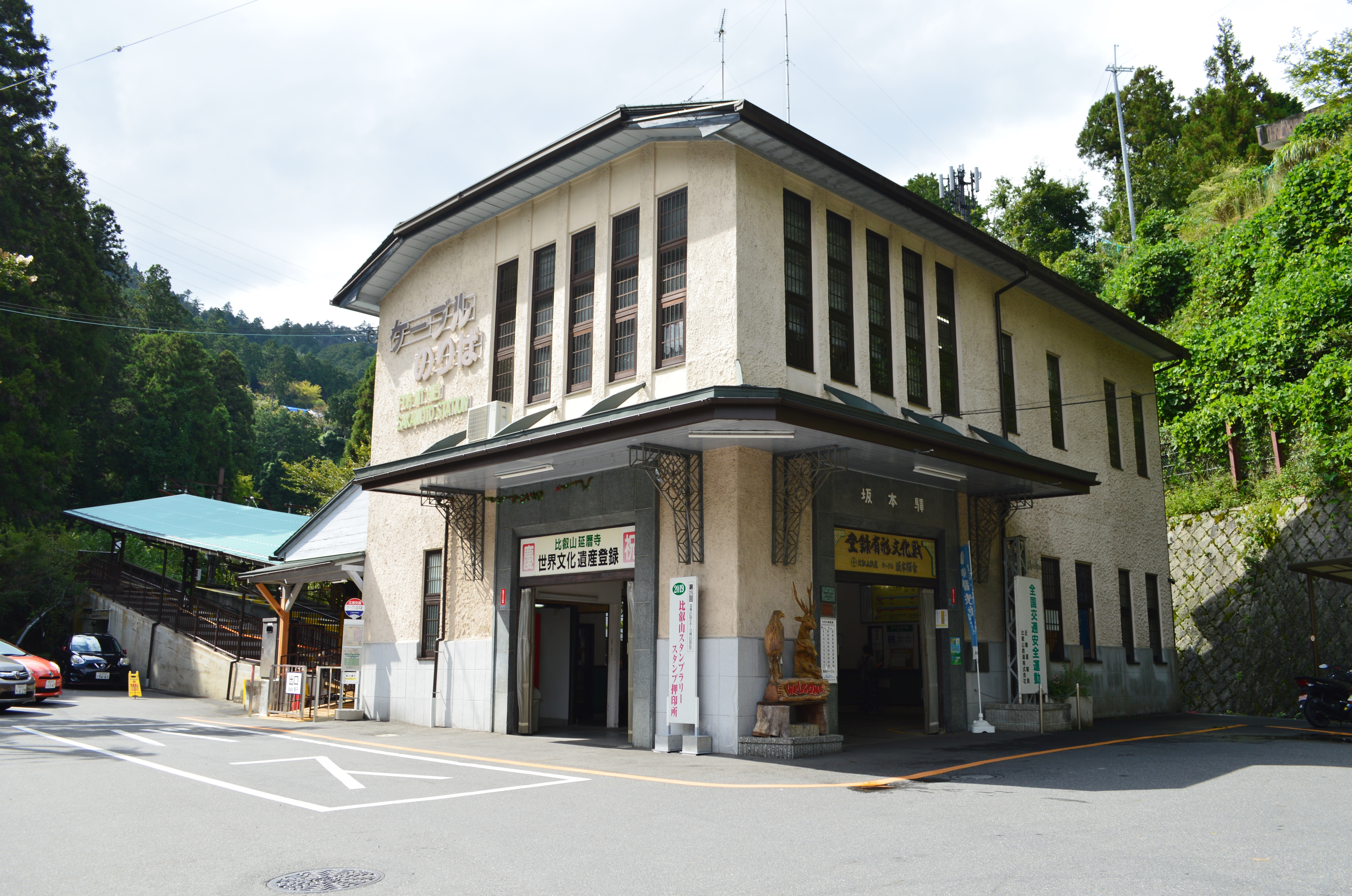
- Cable Sakamoto Station, September 2019

General information
- Location: Sakamotohonmachi, Ōtsu-shi, Shiga-ken 520-0116; Japan
- Coordinates: 35.069660°N 135.863953°E
- Operator: Hieizan Railway
- Line: Sakamoto Cable
- Distance: 2.0 km from Cable Enryakuji
- Platforms: 1 bay platform

History
- Opened: March 15, 1927
- Former names: Sakamoto (to 1974)
Location
- Location within Shiga Prefecture Location within Japan

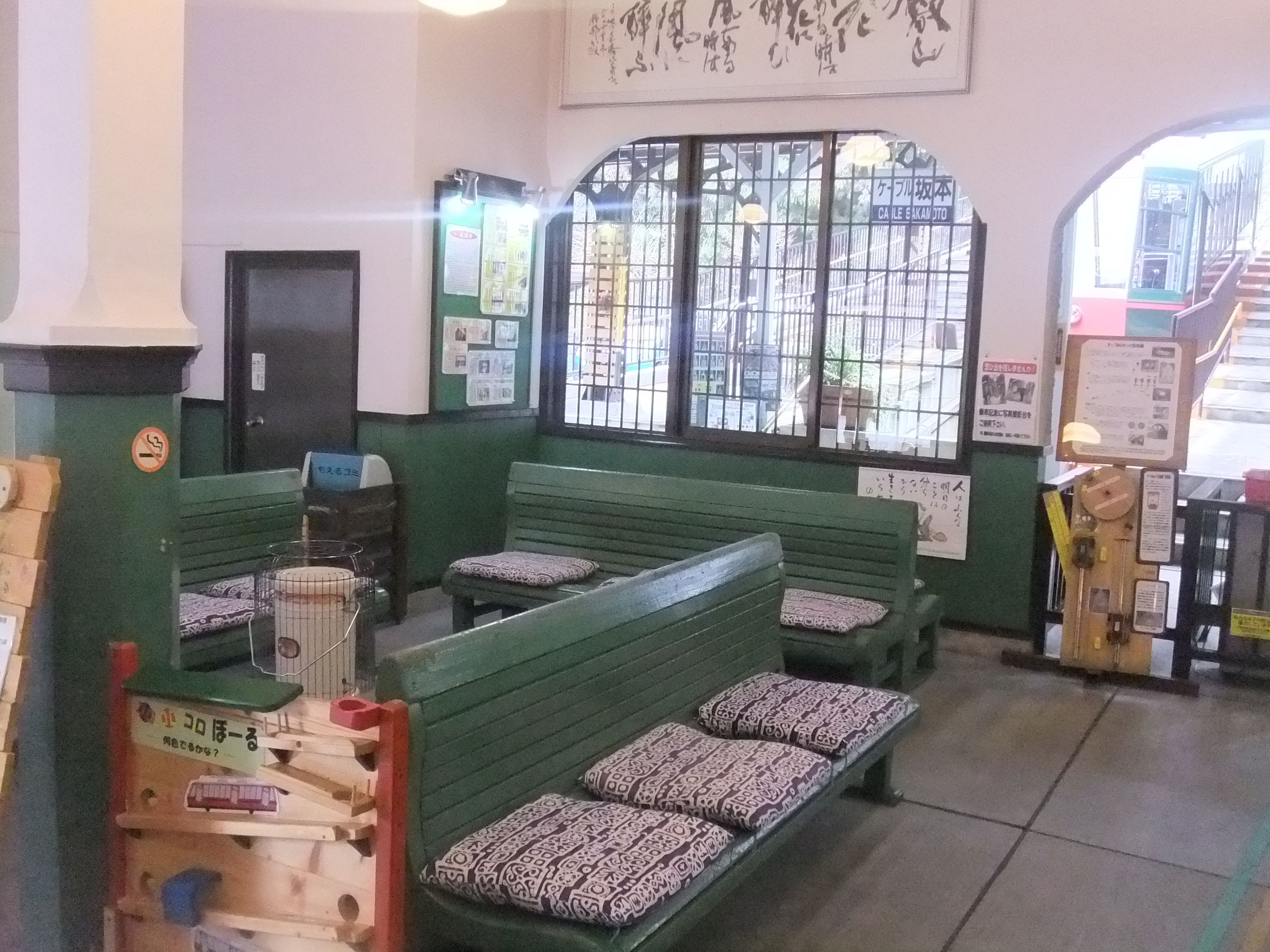
Inside the Station

Cable Sakamoto Station (ケーブル坂本駅, Kēburu-Sakamoto-eki) is a funicular railway station located in the city of Ōtsu, Shiga Prefecture, Japan, operated by the private railway company Hieizan Railway.

== Lines ==
Cable Sakamoto Station is the lower terminus of the Sakamoto Cable, and is 2.0 kilometers from the upper terminus of the line at Cable Enryakuji. It is the longest cable-car route in Japan at 2,025 meters.

== Station layout ==
The station consists of a single bay platform, and when it is crowded, the doors on both sides of the train may be opened to drop passengers. The track has a slope of 160 ‰, but the platform is not a slope but a gentle staircase. The station building was built in 1925 and is a two-story Western-style structure with a ticket office, a waiting room, and a crew waiting room on the first floor and offices on the second floor. The station building received protection by the national government as a Registered Tangible Cultural Property in 2017.

== Adjacent stations ==
«	Service	»
Sakamoto Cable Line
Terminus	-	Hōraioka

== History ==
Cable Sakamoto Station was opened on March 15, 1927, as Sakamoto-eki (坂本駅). Operation were suspended from March 19, 1945, to Augusts 7, 1946. The station was renamed January 15, 1974.

== Surrounding area ==
- Hiyoshi Taisha

== See also ==
- List of railway stations in Japan
