= Minami-Shiga Station =

Railway station in Ōtsu, Shiga Prefecture, Japan

Minamishiga Station 南滋賀駅
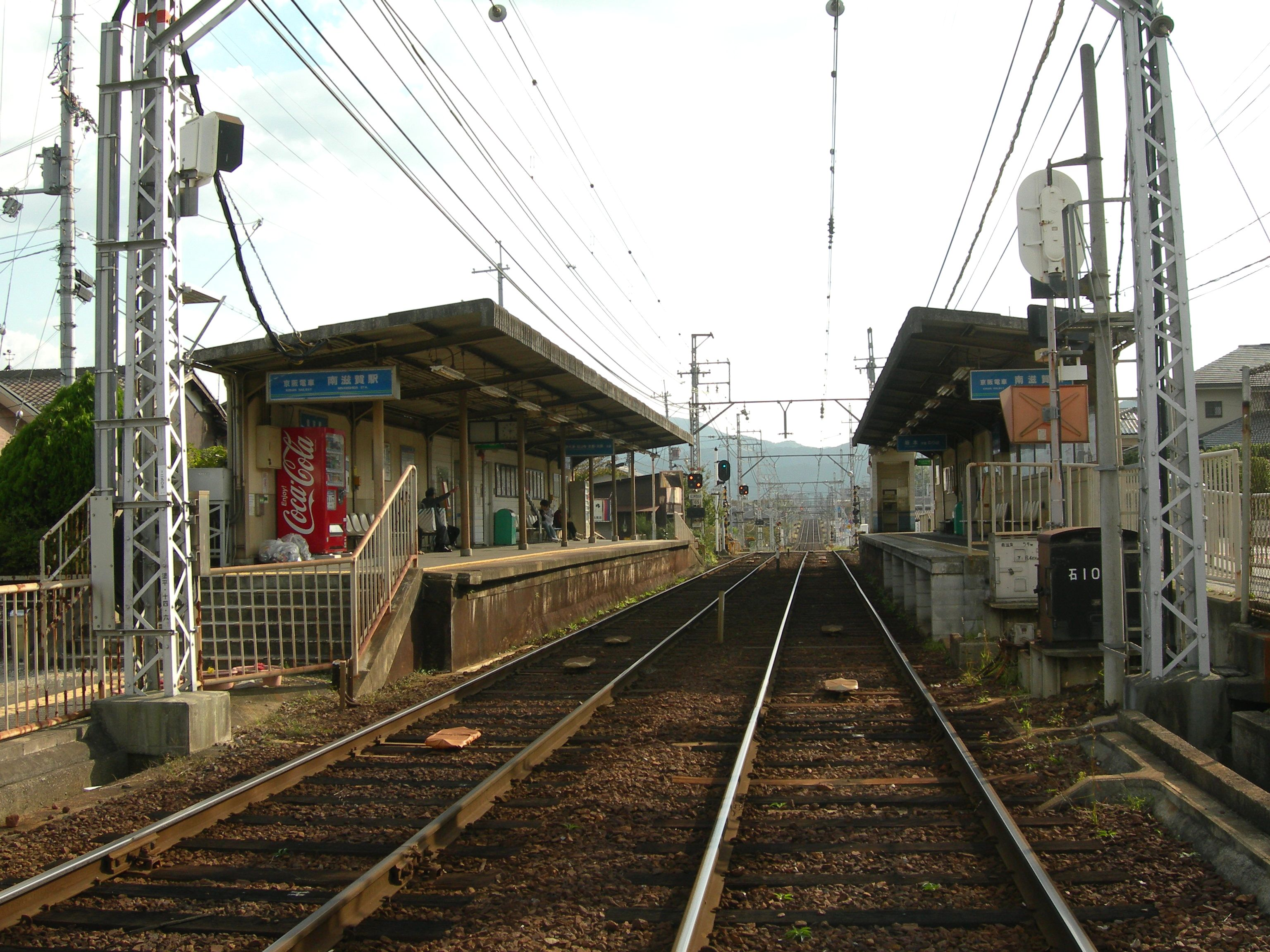
- Minami-Shiga Station, October 2009

General information
- Location: 9-8, Minamishiga 3-chome, Ōtsu-shi, Shiga-ken 520-0011; Japan
- Coordinates: 35.036616°N 135.857569°E
- Operator: Keihan Electric Railway
- Line: Ishiyama Sakamoto Line
- Distance: 10.0 km from Ishiyamadera
- Platforms: 2 side platforms

Other information
- Station code: OT17
- Website: Official website

History
- Opened: May 15, 1927

Passengers
- FY2018: 1134 daily (boarding)

Services
Preceding station	Keihan Electric Railway	Following station
Ōmijingūmae towards Ishiyamadera	Ishiyama Sakamoto Line	Shigasato towards Sakamoto-hieizanguchi
Location
- Location within Shiga Prefecture Location within Japan

Minami-Shiga Station (南滋賀駅, Minami-Shiga-eki) is a passenger railway station located in the city of Ōtsu, Shiga Prefecture, Japan, operated by the private railway company Keihan Electric Railway.

== Lines ==
Minami-Shiga Station is a station of the Ishiyama Sakamoto Line, and is 10.0 kilometers from the terminus of the line at Ishiyamadera.

== Station layout ==
The station consists of two opposed unnumbered side platforms connected by a level crossing. The station is unattended.

== Platforms ==
East	■ Ishiyama Sakamoto Line	for Sakamoto-hieizanguchi
West	■ Ishiyama Sakamoto Line	for Biwako-Hamaōtsu and Ishiyamadera

== History ==
Minami-Shiga Station was opened on May 15, 1927.

== Passenger statistics ==
In fiscal 2018, the station was used by an average of 1134 passengers daily (boarding passengers only).

== Surrounding area ==
- Otsu City Shiga Civic Center
- Otsu Minamishiga Post Office
- Otsu Municipal Shiga Elementary School

== See also ==
- List of railway stations in Japan
