= Shigasato Station =

Railway station in Ōtsu, Shiga Prefecture, Japan

Shigasato Station 滋賀里駅
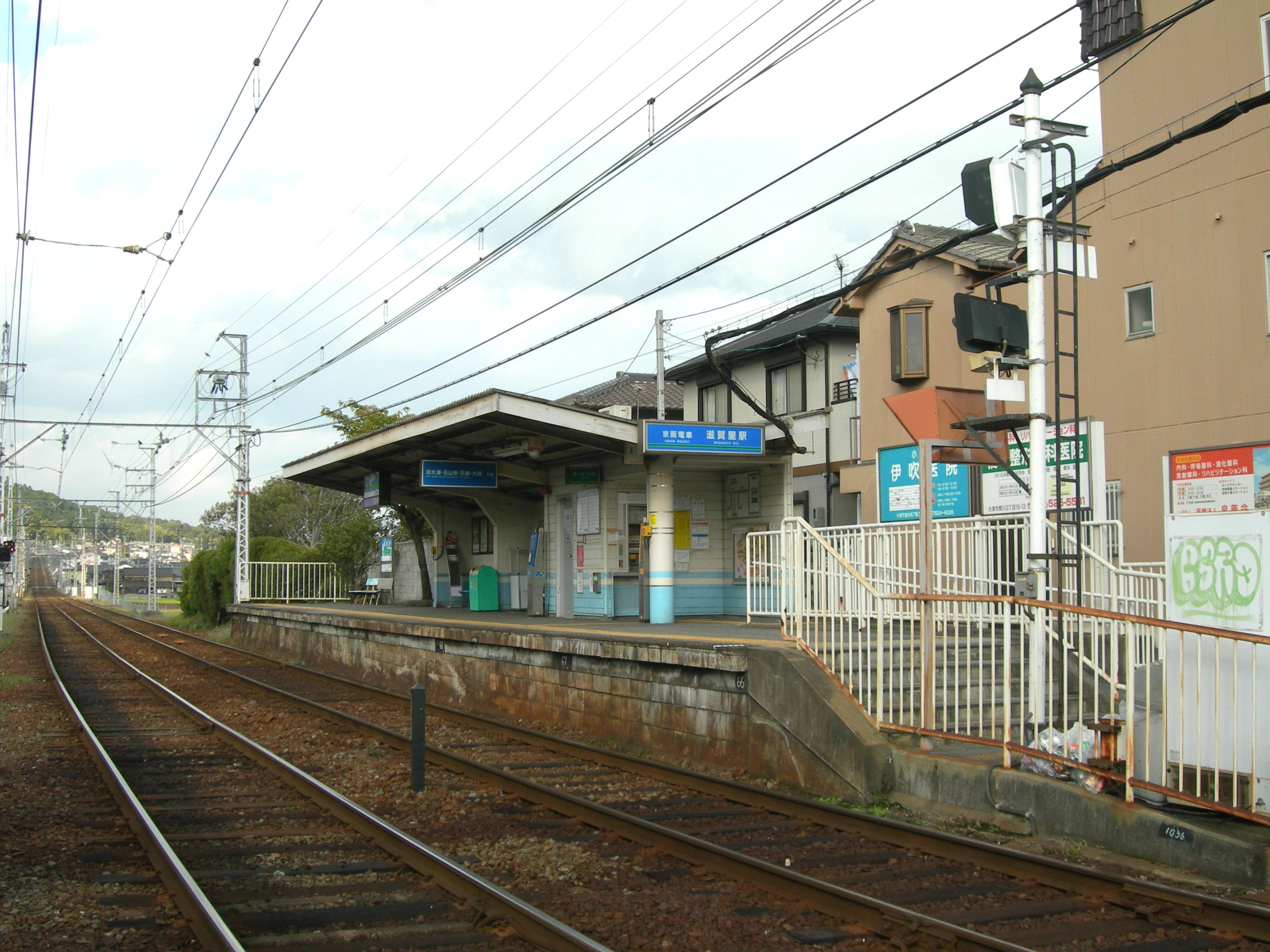
- Shigasato Station, October 2009

General information
- Location: 12, Sakamoto 2-chome, Ōtsu-shi, Shiga-ken 520-0113; Japan
- Coordinates: 35.04338°N 135.859039°E
- Operator: Keihan Electric Railway
- Line: Ishiyama Sakamoto Line
- Distance: 10.8 km from Ishiyamadera
- Platforms: 2 side platforms

Other information
- Station code: OT18
- Website: Official website

History
- Opened: May 15, 1927

Passengers
- FY2018: 932 daily (boarding)

Services
Preceding station	Keihan Electric Railway	Following station
Minami-Shiga towards Ishiyamadera	Ishiyama Sakamoto Line	Anō towards Sakamoto-hieizanguchi
Location
- Location within Shiga Prefecture Location within Japan

Shigasato Station (滋賀里駅, Shigasato-eki) is a passenger railway station located in the city of Ōtsu, Shiga Prefecture, Japan, operated by the private railway company Keihan Electric Railway.

== Lines ==
Shigasato Station is a station of the Ishiyama Sakamoto Line, and is 10.8 kilometers from the terminus of the line at Ishiyamadera.

== Station layout ==
The station consists of two opposed unnumbered side platforms connected by a level crossing. There is no station building, but only a sheet built directly on the platform. The station is unattended.

== Platforms ==
South	■ Ishiyama Sakamoto Line	for Sakamoto-hieizanguchi
North	■ Ishiyama Sakamoto Line	for Biwako-Hamaōtsu and Ishiyamadera

== History ==
Shigasato Station was opened on May 15, 1927. In May 1955, the station was relocated 400 meters towards Ishiyamadera Station from its original location.

== Passenger statistics ==
In fiscal 2018, the station was used by an average of 932 passengers daily (boarding passengers only).

== Surrounding area ==
- Shigasato Hospital
- Shigasato Post Office
- Japan National Route 161

== See also ==
- List of railway stations in Japan
