= Awazu Station (Shiga) =

Railway station in Ōtsu, Japan

Awazu Station 粟津駅
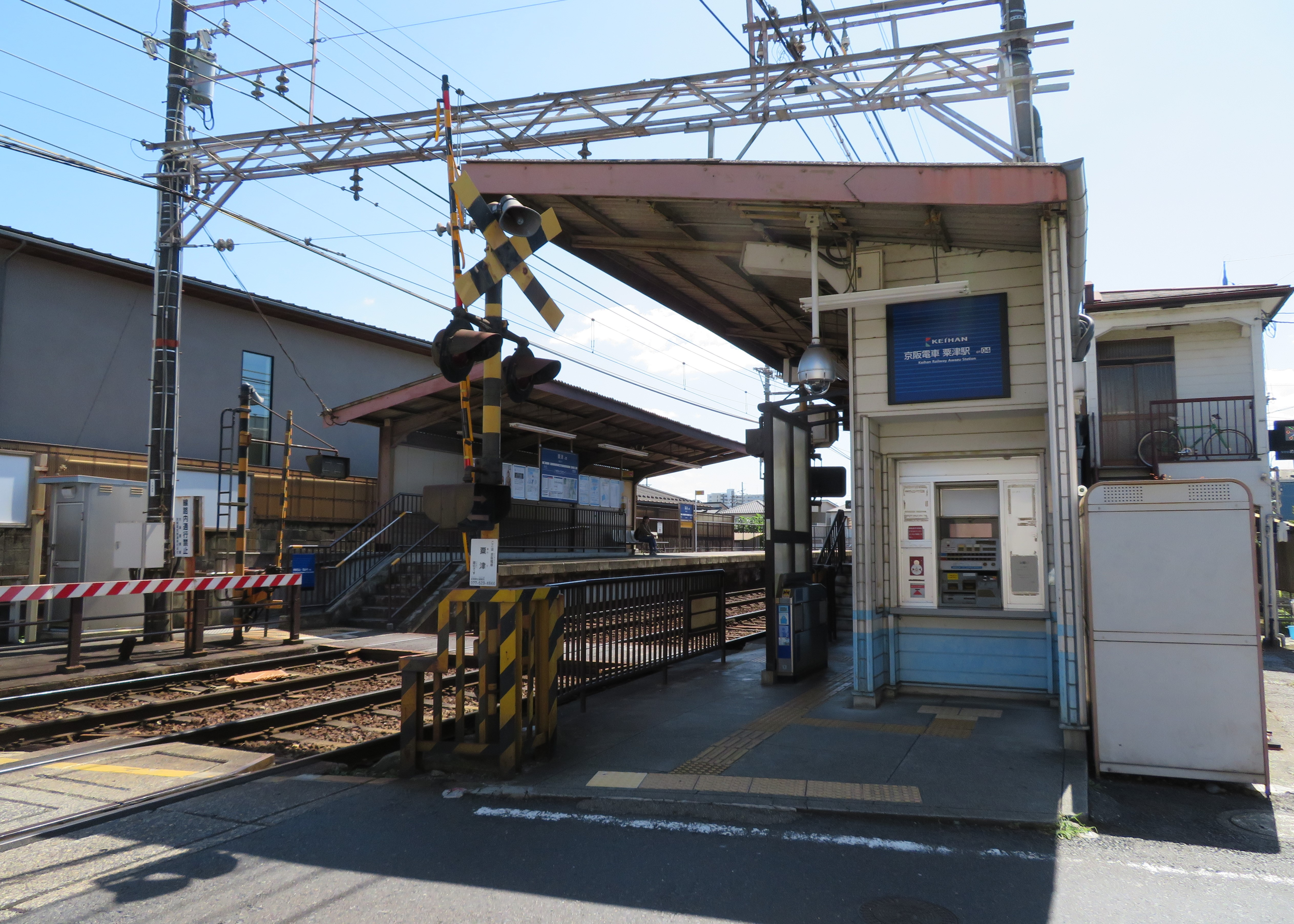
- Awazu Station, September 2019

General information
- Location: 7, Beppo 1-chome, Ōtsu-shi, Shiga-ken 520-0833; Japan
- Coordinates: 34°59′06″N 135°53′44″E
- Operator: Keihan Electric Railway
- Line: Ishiyama Sakamoto Line
- Distance: 2.8 km from Ishiyamadera
- Platforms: 2 side platforms

Other information
- Station code: OT04
- Website: Official website

History
- Opened: March 1, 1913

Passengers
- FY2018: 671 daily (boarding)

Services
Preceding station	Keihan Electric Railway	Following station
Keihan Ishiyama towards Ishiyamadera	Ishiyama Sakamoto Line	Kawaragahama towards Sakamoto-hieizanguchi
Location
- Location within Shiga Prefecture Location within Japan

Awazu Station (粟津駅, Awazu-eki) is a passenger railway station located in the city of Ōtsu, Shiga Prefecture, Japan, operated by the private railway company Keihan Electric Railway.

== Lines ==
Awazu Station is a station of the Ishiyama Sakamoto Line, and is 2.8 kilometers from the terminus of the line at Ishiyamadera.

== Station layout ==
The station consists of two opposed unnumbered side platforms connected by a level crossing. The station is unattended.

=== Platforms ===
Station side	■ Ishiyama Sakamoto Line	for Biwako-Hamaōtsu and Sakamoto-hieizanguchi
Opposite side	■ Ishiyama Sakamoto Line	for Ishiyamadera

== History ==
Awazu Station was opened on March 1, 1913 as Beppo Station (別保駅, Beppo-eki). It was relocated to its present location and renamed to its present name on January 17, 1914.

== Passenger statistics ==
In fiscal 2018, the station was used by an average of 671 passengers daily (boarding passengers only).

== Surrounding area ==
- Renesas Semiconductor Manufacturing Shiga Factory
- Otsu City Awazu Junior High School

== See also ==
- List of railway stations in Japan
