= Kawaragahama Station =

Railway station in Ōtsu, Shiga Prefecture, Japan

Kawaragahama Station 瓦ヶ浜駅
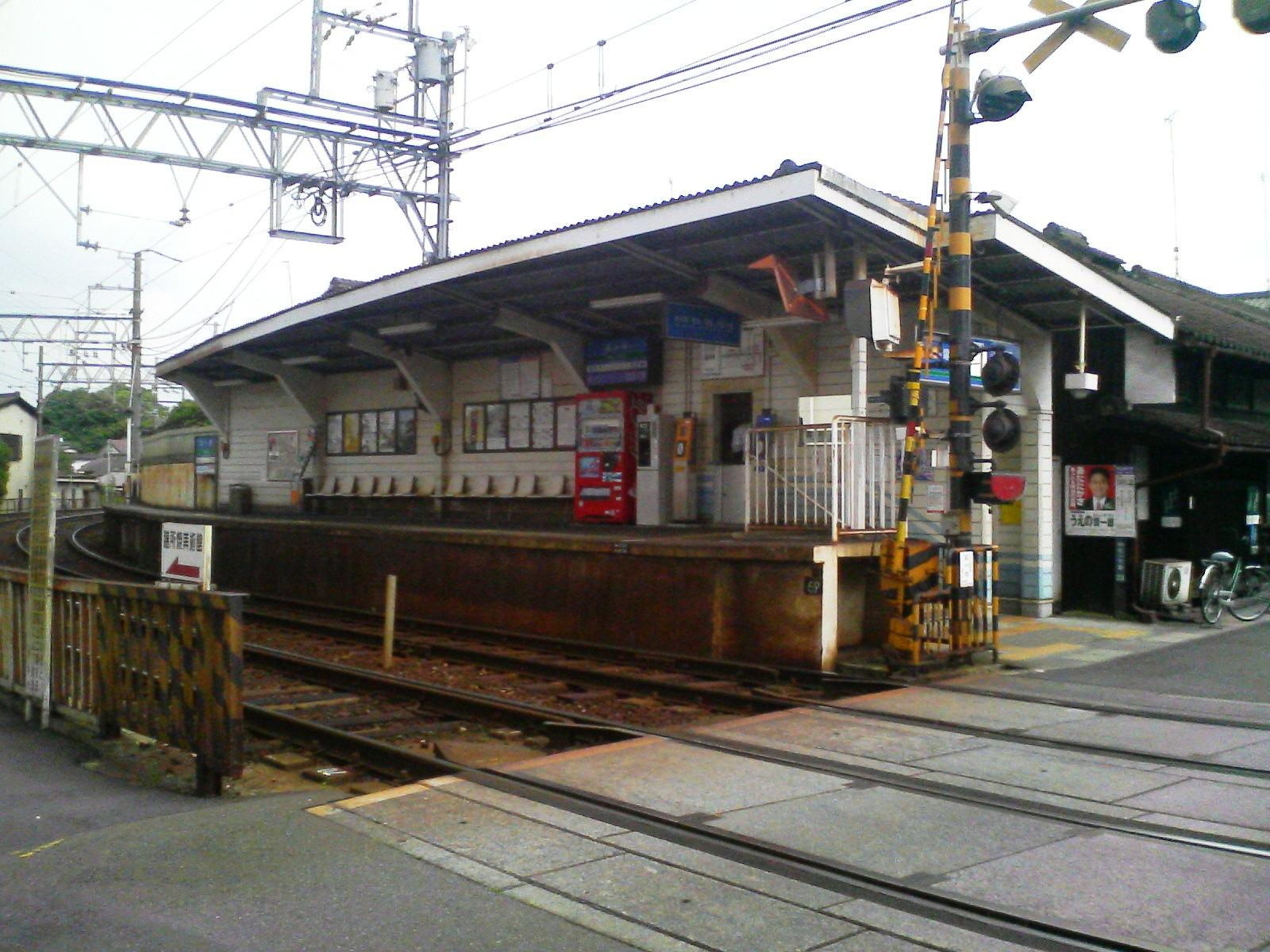
- Kawaragahama Station, June 2008

General information
- Location: Nakashō 1-chome, Ōtsu-shi, Shiga-ken 520-0837; Japan
- Coordinates: 34°59′19″N 135°53′38″E
- Operator: Keihan Electric Railway
- Line: Ishiyama Sakamoto Line
- Distance: 2.8 km from Ishiyamadera
- Platforms: 2 side platforms

Other information
- Station code: OT05
- Website: Official website

History
- Opened: January 17, 1914

Passengers
- FY2018: 737 daily (boarding)

Services
Preceding station	Keihan Electric Railway	Following station
Awazu towards Ishiyamadera	Ishiyama Sakamoto Line	Nakanoshō towards Sakamoto-hieizanguchi
Location
- Location within Shiga Prefecture Location within Japan

Kawaragahama Station (瓦ヶ浜駅, Kawaragahama-eki) is a passenger railway station located in the city of Ōtsu, Shiga Prefecture, Japan, operated by the private railway company Keihan Electric Railway.

== Lines ==
Kawaragahama Station is a station of the Ishiyama Sakamoto Line, and is 2.8 kilometers from the terminus of the line at Ishiyamadera.

== Station layout ==
The station consists of two opposed unnumbered side platforms connected by a level crossing. The station is unattended.

=== Platforms ===
East	■ Ishiyama Sakamoto Line	for Biwako-Hamaōtsu and Sakamoto-hieizanguchi
West	■ Ishiyama Sakamoto Line	for Ishiyamadera

== History ==
Kawaragahama Station was opened on January 17, 1914. The station was closed from August 15, 1944 to December 1, 1945.

== Passenger statistics ==
In fiscal 2018, the station was used by an average of 737 passengers daily (boarding passengers only).

== Surrounding area ==
- Biwako Chuo Hospital
- Zezeyaki Museum
- Honda Shrine
- Wakamiya Hachiman Shrine
- Otsu City Chuo Elementary School

== See also ==
- List of railway stations in Japan
