= Anō Station (Shiga) =

Railway station in Ōtsu, Shiga Prefecture, Japan

Coordinates: 35.05563°N 135.864685°E

Anō Station 穴太駅
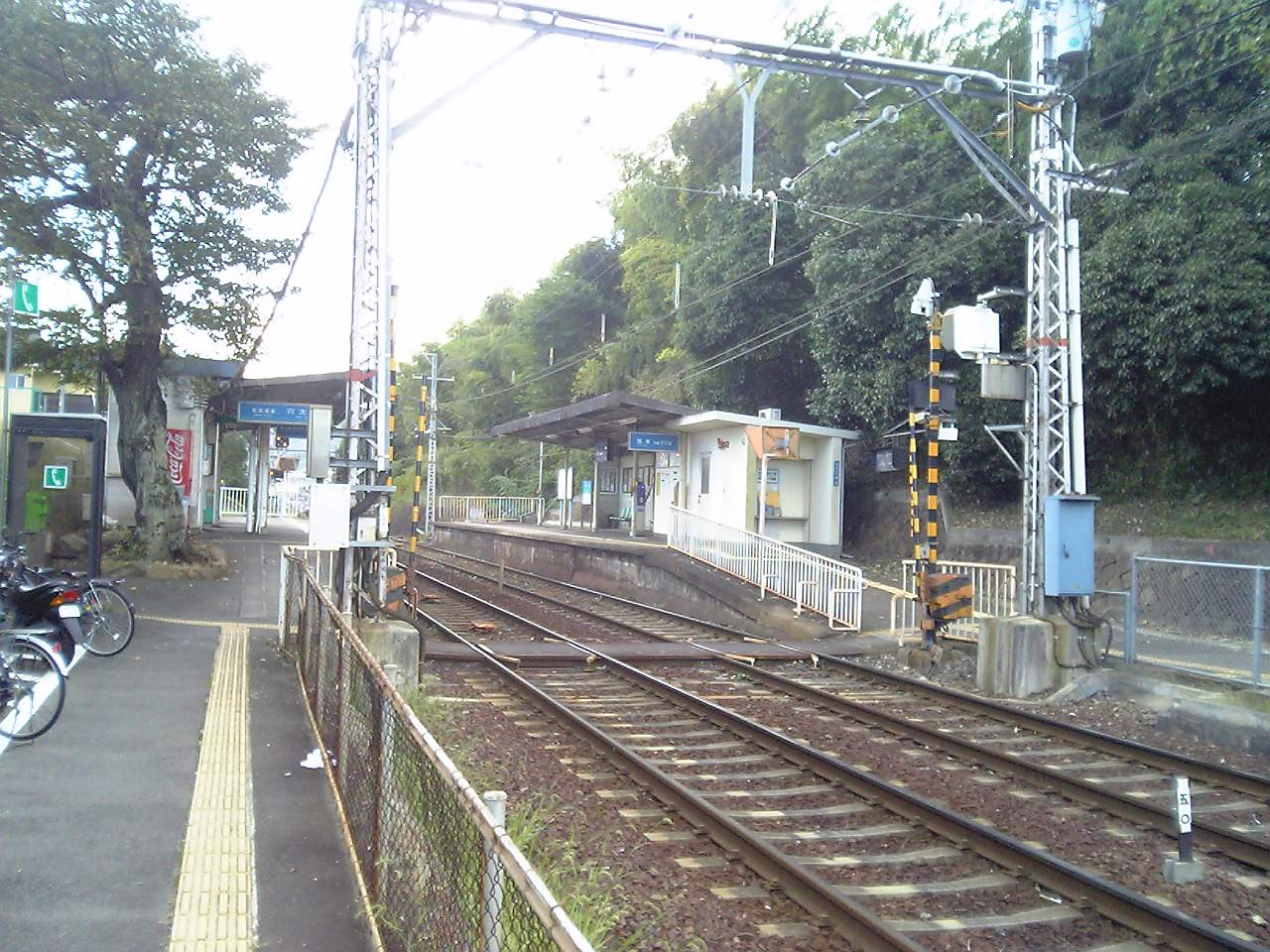
- Anō Station, October 2009

General information
- Location: 9, Anō 2-chome, Ōtsu-shi, Shiga-ken 520-0114; Japan
- Operator: Keihan Electric Railway
- Line: Ishiyama Sakamoto Line
- Distance: 12.3 km from Ishiyamadera
- Platforms: 2 side platforms

Other information
- Station code: OT19
- Website: Official website

History
- Opened: May 15, 1927

Passengers
- FY2018: 463 daily (boarding)

Services
Preceding station	Keihan Electric Railway	Following station
Shigasato towards Ishiyamadera	Ishiyama Sakamoto Line	Matsunobamba towards Sakamoto-hieizanguchi
Location
- Location within Shiga Prefecture Location within Japan

Anō Station (穴太駅, Anō-eki) is a passenger railway station located in the city of Ōtsu, Shiga Prefecture, Japan, operated by the private railway company Keihan Electric Railway.

== Lines ==
Anō Station is a station of the Ishiyama Sakamoto Line, and is 12.3 kilometers from the terminus of the line at Ishiyamadera.

== Station layout ==
The station consists of two opposed side platforms connected by a level crossing. The station is unattended.

== Platforms ==
1	■ Ishiyama Sakamoto Line	for Sakamoto-hieizanguchi
2	■ Ishiyama Sakamoto Line	for Biwako-Hamaōtsu and Ishiyamadera

== History ==
Anō Station was opened on May 15, 1927.

== Passenger statistics ==
In fiscal 2018, the station was used by an average of 463 passengers daily (boarding passengers only).

== Surrounding area ==
- Japan National Route 161
- Karasaki Shrine
- JR West Kosei Line Karasaki Station

== See also ==
- List of railway stations in Japan
