= Otsu-shiyakusho-mae Station =

Railway station in Ōtsu, Shiga Prefecture, Japan

Otsu-shiyakusho-mae Station 大津市役所前駅
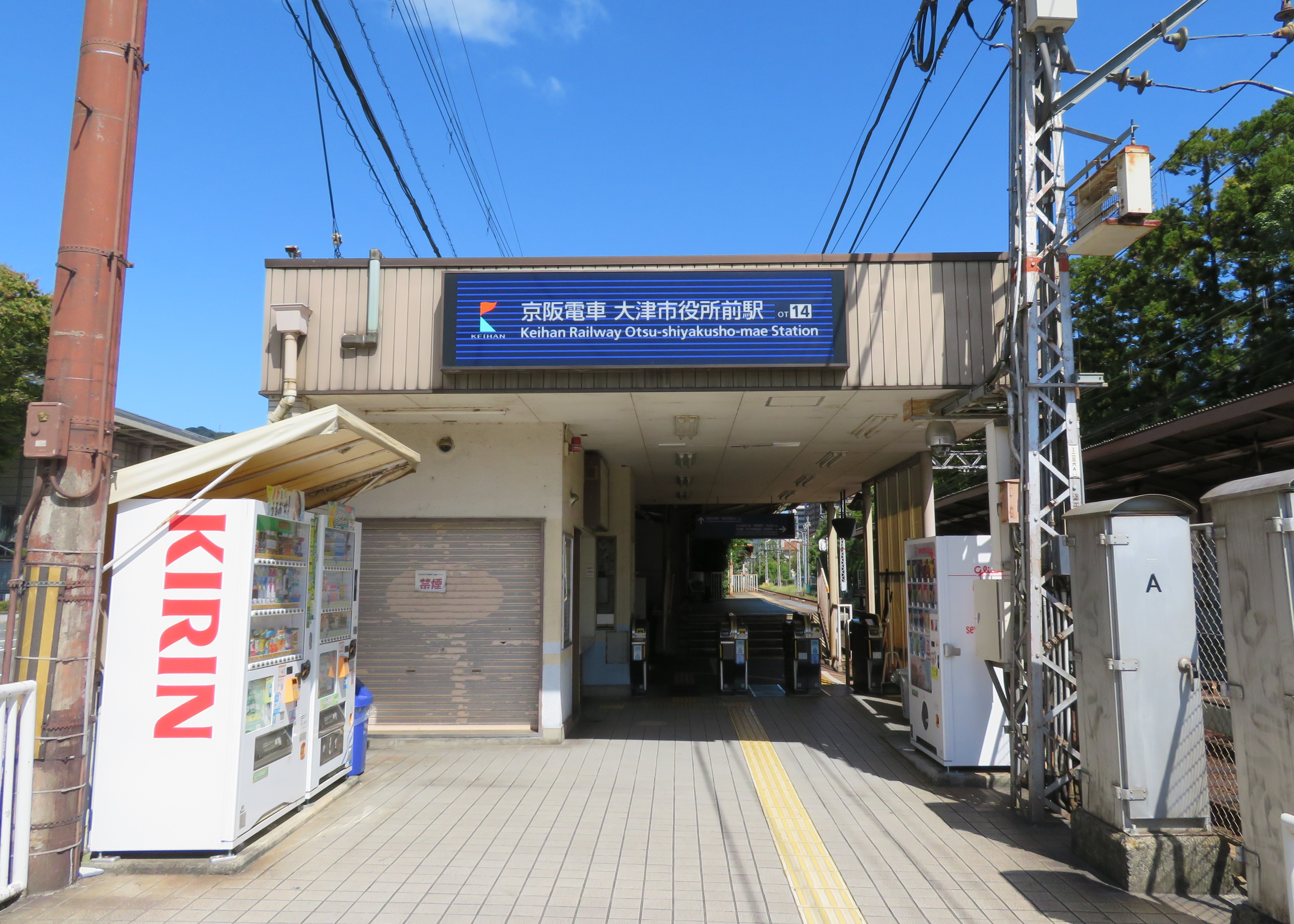
- Otsu-shiyakusho-mae Station, September 2019

General information
- Location: 5 Goryōchō, Ōtsu-shi, Shiga-ken 520-0037; Japan
- Coordinates: 35°01′05″N 135°51′19″E
- Operator: Keihan Electric Railway
- Line: Ishiyama Sakamoto Line
- Distance: 8.0 km from Ishiyamadera
- Platforms: 2 side platforms

Other information
- Station code: OT14
- Website: Official website

History
- Opened: May 15, 1927
- Former names: Heiei-mai (until 1940); Bessho (until 2018)

Passengers
- FY2018: 1334 daily (boarding)

Services
Preceding station	Keihan Electric Railway	Following station
Miidera towards Ishiyamadera	Ishiyama Sakamoto Line	Keihan-otsukyo towards Sakamoto-hieizanguchi
Location
- Location within Shiga Prefecture Location within Japan

Otsu-shiyakusho-mae Station (大津市役所前駅, Ōtsu-shiyakusho-mae-eki) is a passenger railway station located in the city of Ōtsu, Shiga Prefecture, Japan, operated by the private railway company Keihan Electric Railway.

== Lines ==
Otsu-shiyakusho-mae Station is a station of the Ishiyama Sakamoto Line, and is 8.0 kilometers from the terminus of the line at Ishiyamadera.

== Station layout ==
The station consists of two opposed unnumbered side platforms connected by a level crossing. The station is unattended.

== Platforms ==
station side	■ Ishiyama Sakamoto Line	for Sakamoto-hieizanguchi
opposite side	■ Ishiyama Sakamoto Line	for Biwako-Hamaōtsu and Ishiyamadera

== History ==
Otsu-shiyakusho-mae Station was opened on May 15, 1927 as Heiei-mae Station (兵営前駅). The station name was changed to Bessho Station (別所駅) on November 10, 1940. The station was relocated 300 meters towards Sakamoto on September 24, 1967 due to the relocation of the Otsu City Hall. The station name was changed it its present name on March 17, 2018.

== Passenger statistics ==
In fiscal 2018, the station was used by an average of 1334 passengers daily (boarding passengers only).

== Surrounding area ==
- Otsu City Hall
- Otsu City Public Enterprise Bureau
- Otsu City Hall Post Office
- Otsu City Fire Department
- Shiga Prefectural Police Academy
- Shiga Prefectural Otsu Commercial High School

== See also ==
- List of railway stations in Japan
