= Ōmijingūmae Station =

Railway station in Ōtsu, Shiga Prefecture, Japan

Ōmijingūmae Station 近江神宮前駅
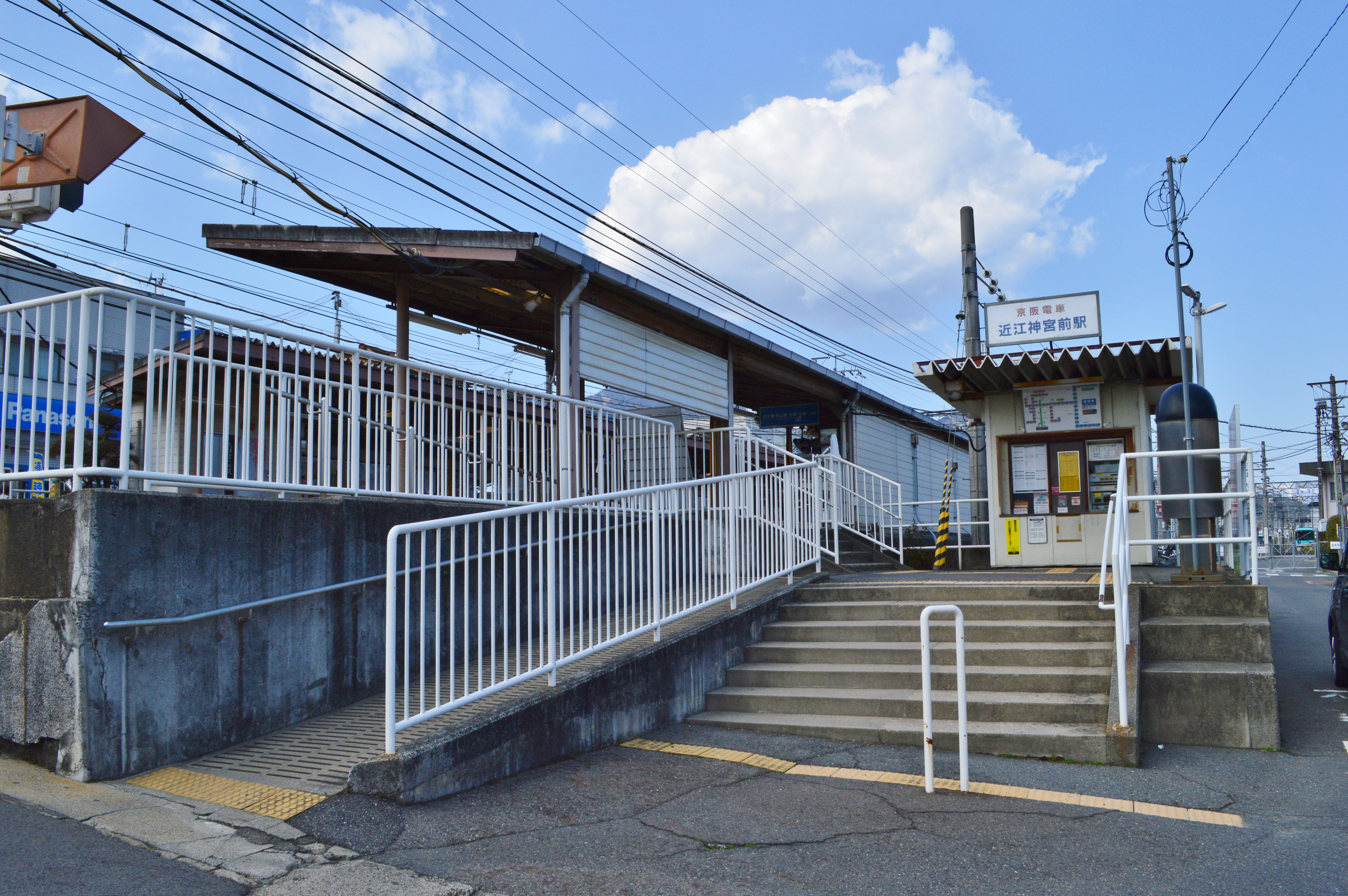
- Ōmijingūmae Station, April 2007

General information
- Location: 7, Nishikōri 2-chome,, Ōtsu-shi, Shiga-ken 520-0027; Japan
- Coordinates: 35°1′41.07″N 135°51′21.02″E
- Operator: Keihan Electric Railway
- Line: Ishiyama Sakamoto Line
- Distance: 9.1 km from Ishiyamadera
- Platforms: 2 side platforms

Other information
- Station code: OT16
- Website: Official website

History
- Opened: May 15, 1927
- Former names: Nishigōri (to 1941)

Passengers
- FY2018: 701 daily (boarding)

Services
Preceding station	Keihan Electric Railway	Following station
Keihan-otsukyo towards Ishiyamadera	Ishiyama Sakamoto Line	Minami-Shiga towards Sakamoto-hieizanguchi
Location
- Location within Shiga Prefecture Location within Japan

Ōmijingūmae Station (近江神宮前駅, Ōmijingūmae-eki) is a passenger railway station located in the city of Ōtsu, Shiga Prefecture, Japan, operated by the private railway company Keihan Electric Railway.

== Lines ==
Ōmijingūmae Station is a station of the Ishiyama Sakamoto Line, and is 9.1 kilometers from the terminus of the line at Ishiyamadera.

== Station layout ==
The station consists of two opposed unnumbered side platforms connected by a level crossing. There is no station building and the station is unattended. The station is located next to Nishigori Depot. Trains terminating at this station return to the east side platform from the through track to Sakamoto in the north of the station to start for Ishiyamadera because there is no siding track at the station, and the east side platform serves the trains starting from this station for Sakamoto because there is no connection from the depot to the west side platform for Sakamoto.

== Platforms ==
West	■ Ishiyama Sakamoto Line	for Sakamoto-hieizanguchi
East	■ Ishiyama Sakamoto Line	for Biwako-Hamaōtsu and Ishiyamadera

== History ==
Ōmijingūmae Station was opened on May 15, 1927, as Nishigōri Station (錦織駅). It was renamed to its present name on February 1, 1941, but reverted to its original name from January 8 to July 10, 1948.

== Passenger statistics ==
In fiscal 2018, the station was used by an average of 701 passengers daily (boarding passengers only).

== Surrounding area ==
- Omi Shrine
- Otsu Nishikori Post Office
- Ōmi Ōtsukyō Nishigōri Site
- Yanagasaki Lakeside Park

== See also ==
- List of railway stations in Japan
