= Zezehommachi Station =

Railway station in Ōtsu, Shiga Prefecture, Japan

Zezehommachi Station 膳所本町駅
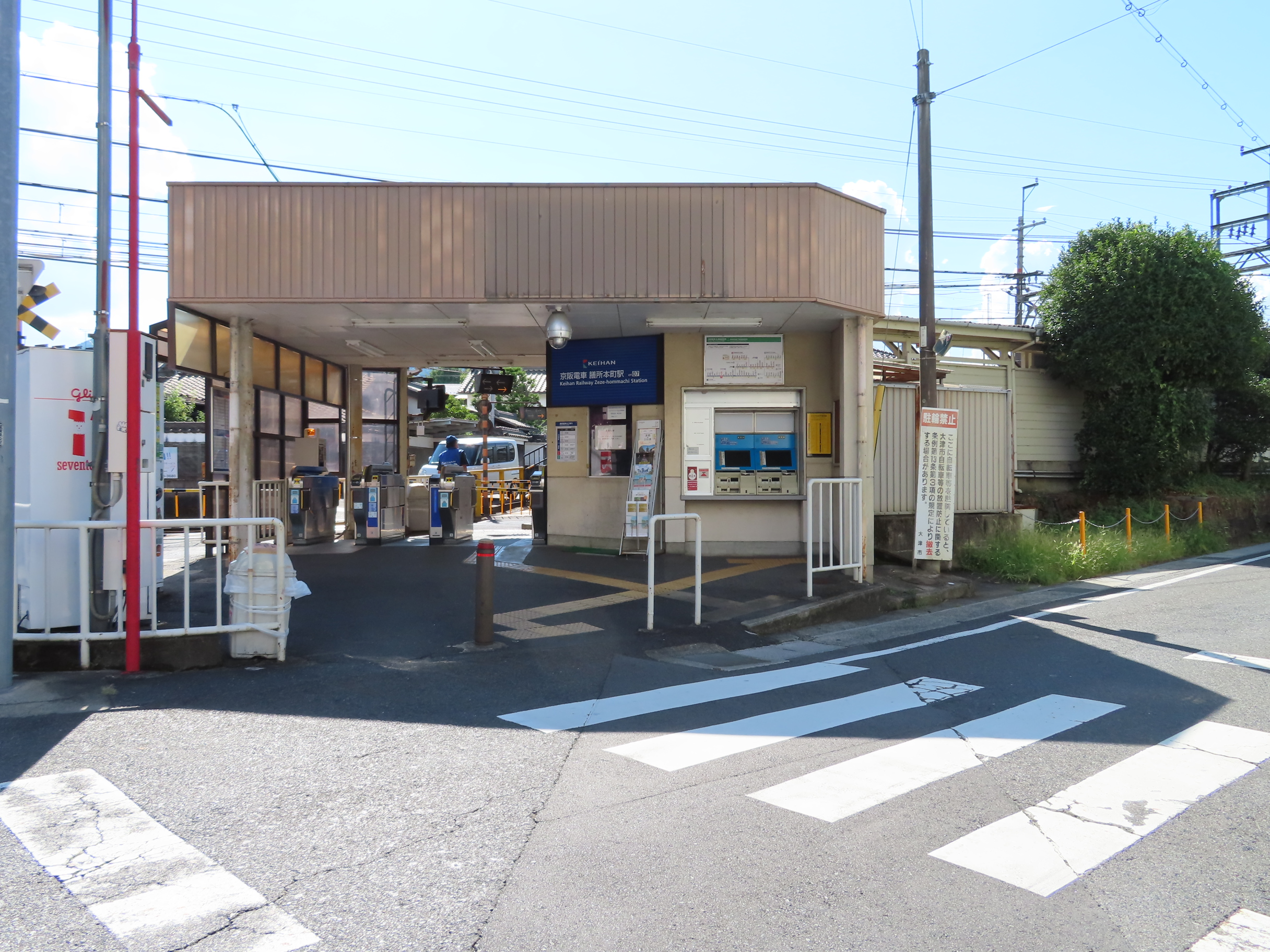
- Zezehommachi Station, August 2020

General information
- Location: 2-8 Zeze, Ōtsu-shi, Shiga-ken 520-0815; Japan
- Coordinates: 34°59′42.38″N 135°53′21.66″E
- Operator: Keihan Electric Railway
- Line: Ishiyama Sakamoto Line
- Distance: 3.8 km from Ishiyamadera
- Platforms: 2 side platforms

Other information
- Station code: OT07
- Website: Official website

History
- Opened: March 1, 1913
- Former names: Zeze (to 1938)

Passengers
- FY2018: 1989 daily (boarding)

Services
Preceding station	Keihan Electric Railway	Following station
Nakanoshō towards Ishiyamadera	Ishiyama Sakamoto Line	Nishiki towards Sakamoto-hieizanguchi
Location
- Location within Shiga Prefecture Location within Japan

Zezehommachi Station (膳所本町駅, Zezehonmachi-eki) is a passenger railway station located in the city of Ōtsu, Shiga Prefecture, Japan, operated by the private railway company Keihan Electric Railway.

== Lines ==
Zezehommachi Station is a station of the Ishiyama Sakamoto Line, and is 3.8 kilometers from the terminus of the line at Ishiyamadera.

== Station layout ==
The station consists of two opposed unnumbered side platforms connected by a level crossing. The station is unattended.

== Platforms ==
Station side	■ Ishiyama Sakamoto Line	for Ishiyamadera
Opposite side	■ Ishiyama Sakamoto Line	for Biwako-Hamaōtsu and Sakamoto-hieizanguchi

== History ==
Zezehommachi Station was opened on March 1, 1913 as Zeze Station (膳所駅, Zeze-eki). It was renamed on August 20, 1938.

== Passenger statistics ==
In fiscal 2018, the station was used by an average of 1989 passengers daily (boarding passengers only).

== Surrounding area ==
- Shiga Prefectural Zeze High School
- Zeze Shrine
- Zeze Castle Ruins Park

== See also ==
- List of railway stations in Japan
