= Keihan =

In Japanese, Keihan may refer to:

== People ==
- Keihan Takahashi (高橋 慶帆; born 2003), Japanese volleyball player

== Places ==
- Keihan (京阪), the Kyoto-Osaka area, part of the larger Keihanshin (京阪神; Kyoto-Osaka-Kobe) area.
- Keihan-ishiyama Station (京阪石山駅), is a passenger railway station located in the city of Ōtsu
- Keihan-otsukyo Station (京阪大津京駅), is a passenger railway station located in the city of Ōtsu
- Keihan Bus (京阪バス株式会社), is a bus company that operates within Osaka
- Keihan Cable Line (京阪鋼索線), is a funicular line in Yawata, Kyoto, Japan
- Keihan Electric Railway (京阪電気鉄道), a Kyoto-Osaka train line, often abbreviated to Keihan.
- Keihan Ishiyama Sakamoto Line (京阪石山坂本線), is a railway line in Shiga Prefecture
- Keihan Katano Line (京阪交野線), is a railway line in northern Osaka Prefecture
- Keihan Keishin Line (京津線), is an interurban partially-street running railway line in Japan
- Keihan Main Line (京阪本線), is a railway line in Japan operated by Keihan Electric Railway
- Keihan Nakanoshima Line (京阪中之島線), is a railway line operated by the Keihan Electric Railway in Osaka
- Keihan Ōtō Line (鴨東線), is a railway line in Kyoto
- Keihan Uji Line (京阪宇治線), is a commuter rail line in Kyoto, Japan
- Keihan Zeze Station (京阪膳所駅), is a passenger railway station located in the city of Ōtsu

== Other uses ==
- Keihan Hai (京阪杯), Japanese Grade 3 horse race for Thoroughbreds
- Keihan rice (鶏飯, Keihan), a local dish of the Amami Islands, Kagoshima Prefecture in the south of Japan.
