= Nishiki Station =

Railway station in Ōtsu, Shiga Prefecture, Japan

Nishiki Station 錦駅
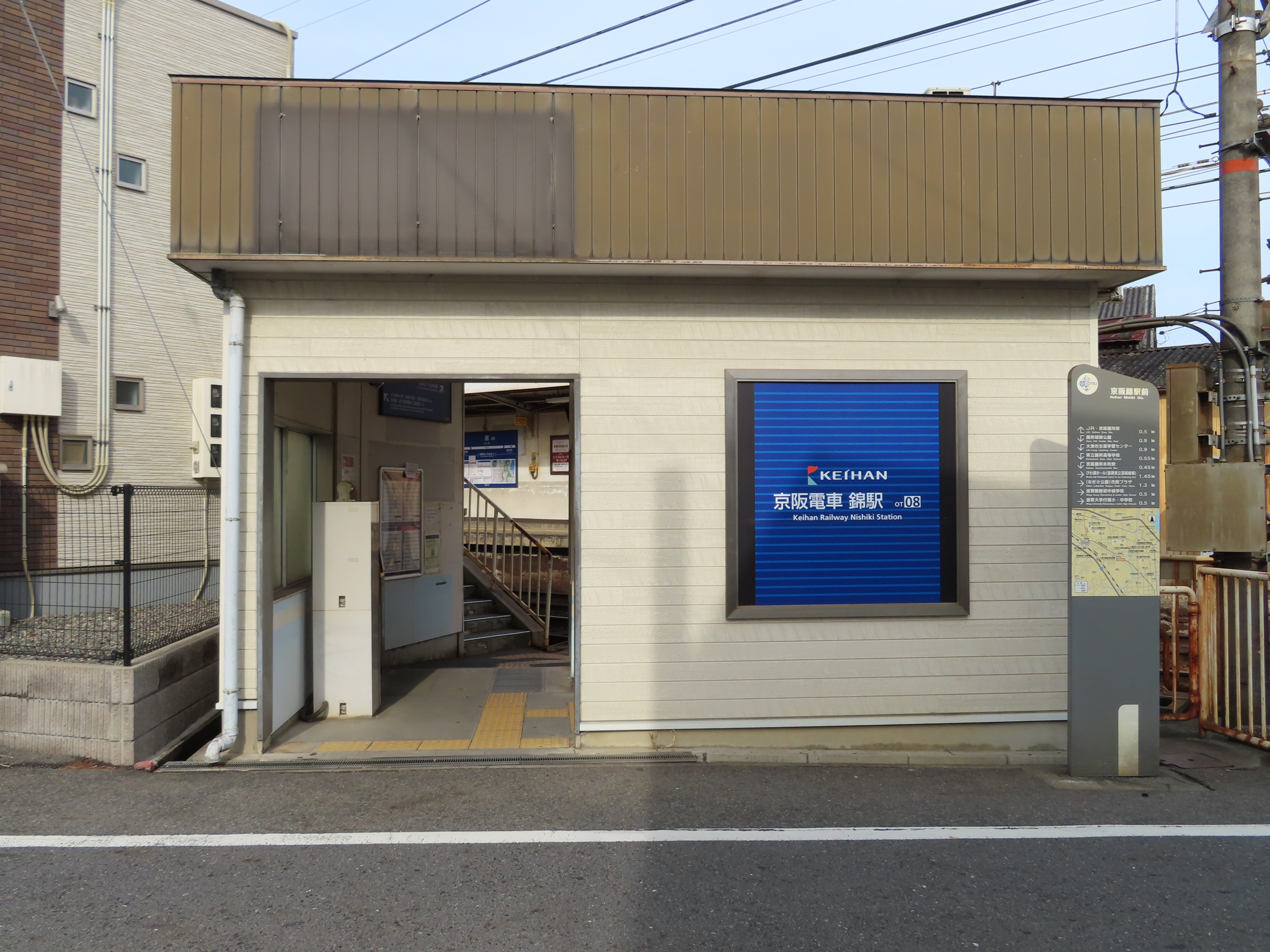
- Nishiki Station, January 2020

General information
- Location: 2, Shōwa-chō, Ōtsu-shi, Shiga-ken 520-0817; Japan
- Coordinates: 34°59′51″N 135°53′09″E
- Operator: Keihan Electric Railway
- Line: Ishiyama Sakamoto Line
- Distance: 4.2 km from Ishiyamadera
- Platforms: 2 side platforms

Other information
- Station code: OT08
- Website: Official website

History
- Opened: March 1, 1913
- Closed: 1944-1959

Passengers
- FY2018: 978 daily (boarding)

Services
| Preceding station | Keihan Electric Railway | Following station |
|---|---|---|
| Zezehommachi towards Ishiyamadera | Ishiyama Sakamoto Line | Keihan Zeze towards Sakamoto-hieizanguchi |
Location
- Location within Shiga Prefecture Location within Japan

Nishiki Station (錦駅, Nishiki-eki) is a passenger railway station located in the city of Ōtsu, Shiga Prefecture, Japan, operated by the private railway company Keihan Electric Railway.

== Lines ==
Nishiki Station is a station of the Ishiyama Sakamoto Line, and is 4.2 kilometers from the terminus of the line at Ishiyamadera.

== Station layout ==
The station consists of two opposed unnumbered side platforms connected by a level crossing. The station is unattended.

== Platforms ==
| Station side | ■ Ishiyama Sakamoto Line | for Biwako-Hamaōtsu and Sakamoto-hieizanguchi |
| Opposite side | ■ Ishiyama Sakamoto Line | for Ishiyamadera |

== History ==
Nishiki Station was opened on March 1, 1913. The station was closed from August 15, 1944, to September 1, 1959.

== Passenger statistics ==
In fiscal 2018, the station was used by an average of 978 passengers daily (boarding passengers only).

== Surrounding area ==
- Shiga University Faculty of Education Elementary School
- Shiga University Faculty of Education Junior High School

== See also ==
- List of railway stations in Japan
