= Miidera Station =

Railway station in Ōtsu, Shiga Prefecture, Japan

Miidera Station 三井寺駅
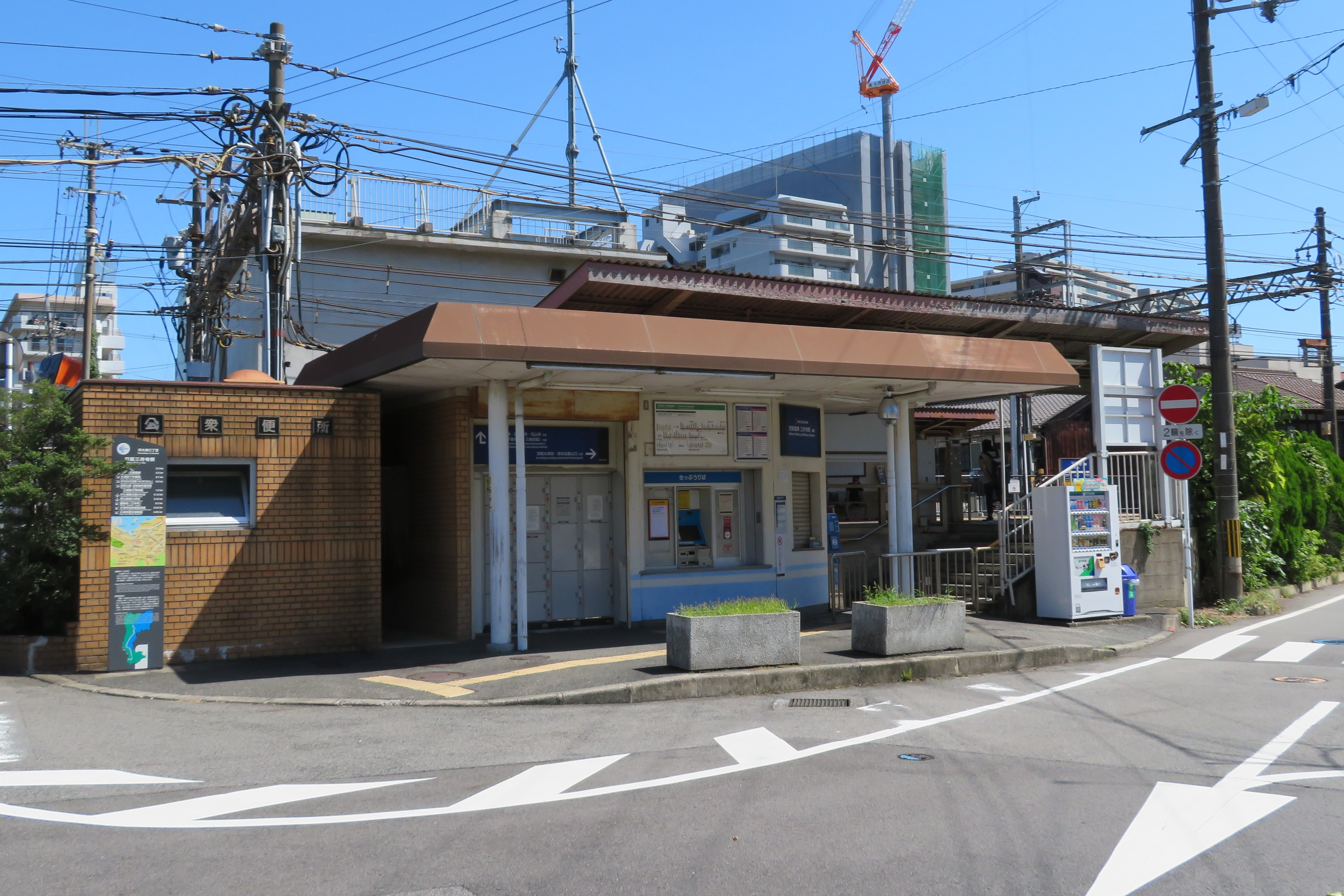
- Miidera Station, October 2019

General information
- Location: 64, Hamaōtsu 3-chome, Ōtsu-shi, Shiga-ken 520-0047; Japan
- Coordinates: 35°00′47″N 135°51′34″E
- Operator: Keihan Electric Railway
- Line: Ishiyama Sakamoto Line
- Distance: 7.2 km from Ishiyamadera
- Platforms: 2 side platforms

Other information
- Station code: OT13
- Website: Official website

History
- Opened: May 7, 1922

Passengers
- FY2018: 929 daily (boarding)

Services
Preceding station	Keihan Electric Railway	Following station
Biwako-hamaotsu towards Ishiyamadera	Ishiyama Sakamoto Line	Otsu-shiyakusho-mae towards Sakamoto-hieizanguchi
Location
- Location within Shiga Prefecture Location within Japan

Miidera Station (三井寺駅, Miidera-eki) is a passenger railway station located in the city of Ōtsu, Shiga Prefecture, Japan, operated by the private railway company Keihan Electric Railway.

== Lines ==
Miidera Station is a station of the Ishiyama Sakamoto Line, and is 7.2 kilometers from the terminus of the line at Ishiyamadera.

== Station layout ==
The station consists of two opposed unnumbered side platforms. Each platform has its own separate exit and there is no interconnection between platforms. The station is unattended.

== Platforms ==
West	■ Ishiyama Sakamoto Line	for Sakamoto-hieizanguchi
East	■ Ishiyama Sakamoto Line	for Biwako-Hamaōtsu and Ishiyamadera

== History ==
Miidera Station was opened on May 7, 1922.

== Passenger statistics ==
In fiscal 2018, the station was used by an average of 929 passengers daily (boarding passengers only).

== Surrounding area ==
- Lake Biwa Canal
- Biwako Boat Racecourse
- Mii-dera
- Otsu City Nagara Elementary School

== See also ==
- List of railway stations in Japan
