= Matsunobamba Station =

Railway station in Ōtsu, Shiga Prefecture, Japan

Matsunobamba Station 松ノ馬場駅
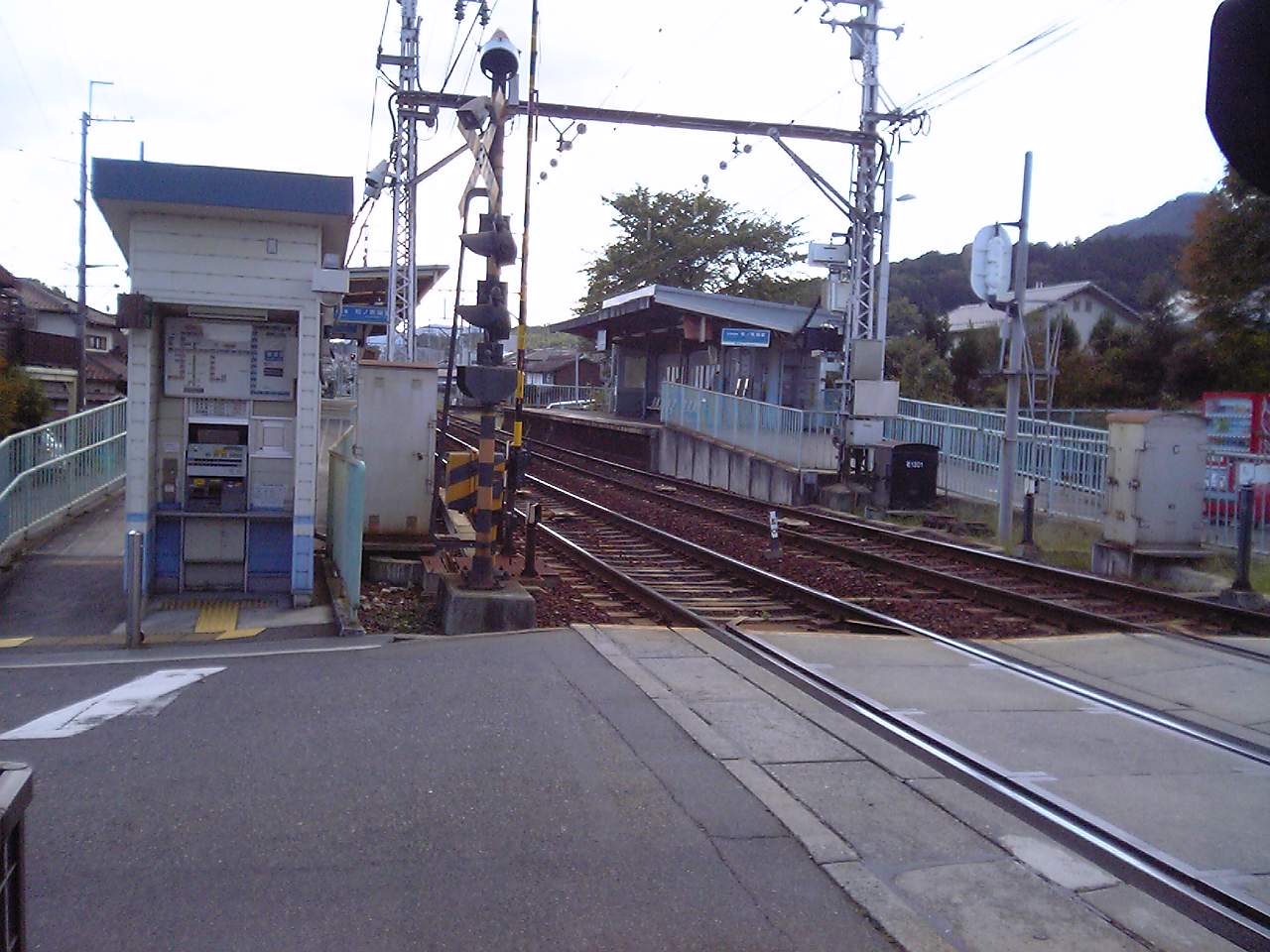
- Matsunobamba Station, October 2009

General information
- Location: 12, Sakamoto 2-chome, Ōtsu-shi, Shiga-ken 520-0113; Japan
- Coordinates: 35.065541°N 135.870406°E
- Operator: Keihan Electric Railway
- Line: Ishiyama Sakamoto Line
- Distance: 13.5 km from Ishiyamadera
- Platforms: 2 side platforms

Other information
- Station code: OT20
- Website: Official website

History
- Opened: May 15, 1927

Passengers
- FY2018: 890 daily (boarding)

Services
Preceding station	Keihan Electric Railway	Following station
Anō towards Ishiyamadera	Ishiyama Sakamoto Line	Sakamoto-hieizanguchi Terminus
Location
- Location within Shiga Prefecture Location within Japan

Matsunobamba Station (松ノ馬場駅, Matsunobanba-eki) is a passenger railway station located in the city of Ōtsu, Shiga Prefecture, Japan, operated by the private railway company Keihan Electric Railway.

== Lines ==
Matsunobamba Station is a station of the Ishiyama Sakamoto Line, and is 13.5 kilometers from the terminus of the line at Ishiyamadera.

== Station layout ==
The station consists of two opposed side platforms connected by a level crossing. The station is unattended.

== Platforms ==
1	■ Ishiyama Sakamoto Line	for Sakamoto-hieizanguchi
2	■ Ishiyama Sakamoto Line	for Biwako-Hamaōtsu and Ishiyamadera

== History ==
Matsunobamba Station was opened on May 15, 1927.

== Passenger statistics ==
In fiscal 2018, the station was used by an average of 890 passengers daily (boarding passengers only).

== Surrounding area ==
- Sakamoto Castle ruins
- Biwako Hospital
- Tonan-ji
- Otsu City Shimosakamoto Elementary School

== See also ==
- List of railway stations in Japan
