= Karahashimae Station =

Railway station in Ōtsu, Shiga Prefecture, Japan

Karahashimae Station 唐橋前駅
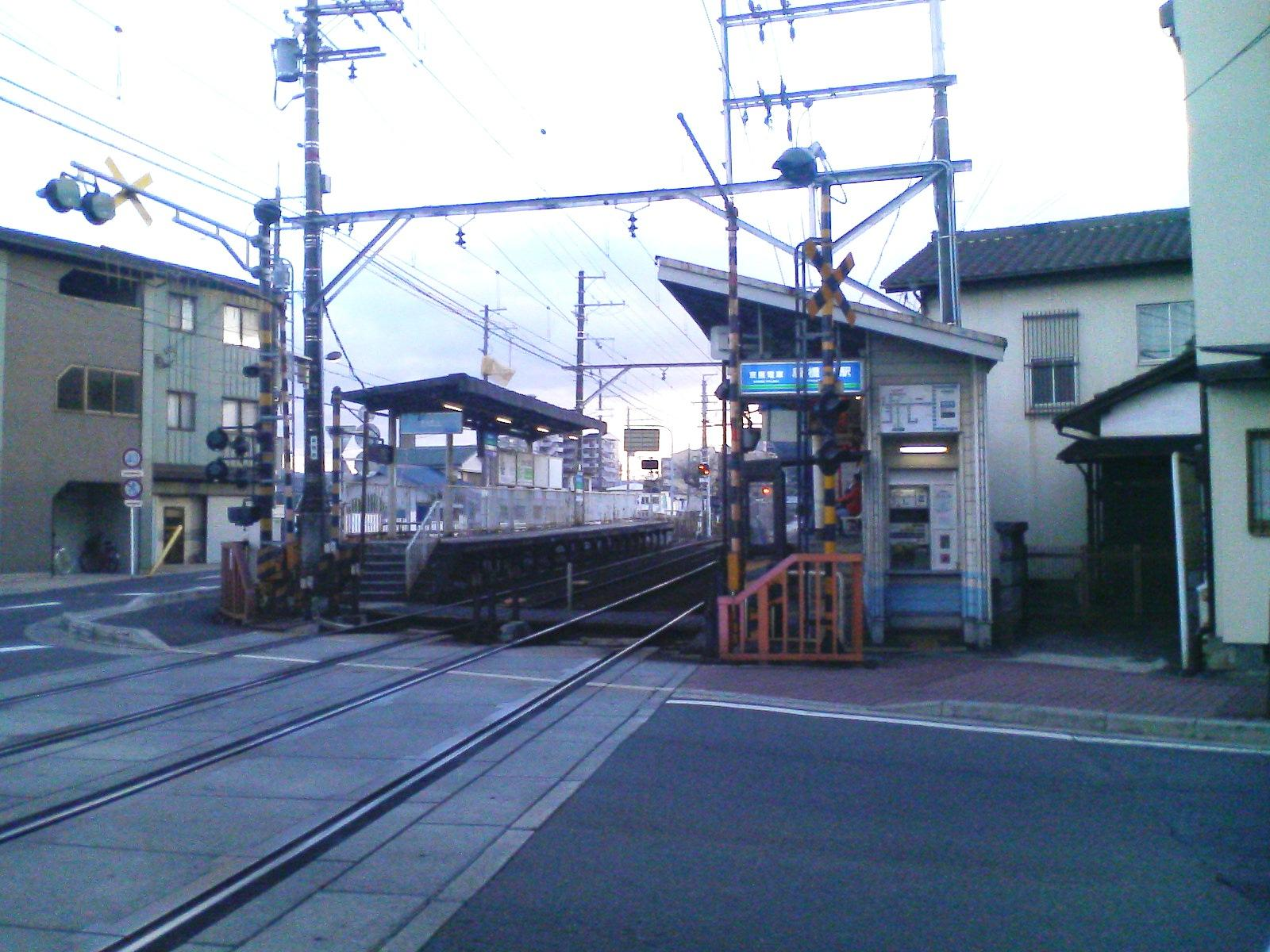
- Karahashimae Station, January 2008

General information
- Location: 7, Toriigawa-cho, Ōtsu-shi, Shiga-ken 520-0854; Japan
- Coordinates: 34°58′25″N 135°54′11″E
- Operator: Keihan Electric Railway
- Line: Ishiyama Sakamoto Line
- Distance: 0.7 km from Ishiyamadera
- Platforms: 2 side platforms

Other information
- Station code: OT02
- Website: Official website

History
- Opened: January 17, 1914

Passengers
- FY2018: 800 daily (boarding)

Services
Preceding station	Keihan Electric Railway	Following station
Ishiyamadera Terminus	Ishiyama Sakamoto Line	Keihan Ishiyama towards Sakamoto-hieizanguchi
Location
- Location within Shiga Prefecture Location within Japan

Karahashimae Station (唐橋前駅, Karahashimae-eki) is a passenger railway station located in the city of Ōtsu, Shiga Prefecture, Japan, operated by the private railway company Keihan Electric Railway.

== Lines ==
Karahashimae Station is a station of the Ishiyama Sakamoto Line, 0.7 kilometers from the terminus of the line at Ishiyamadera.

== Station layout ==
The station consists of two opposed unnumbered side platforms connected by a level crossing. The station is unattended.

=== Platforms ===
Station side	■ Ishiyama Sakamoto Line	for Biwako-Hamaōtsu and Sakamoto-hieizanguchi
Opposite side	■ Ishiyama Sakamoto Line	for Ishiyamadera

== History ==
Karahashimae Station was opened on January 17, 1914.

== Passenger statistics ==
In fiscal 2018, the station was used by an average of 800 passengers daily (boarding passengers only).

== Surrounding area ==
- Seto no Karahashi
- Otsu City Seiran Elementary School
- Shiga Prefectural Seta Technical High School
- Japan National Route 422

== See also ==
- List of railway stations in Japan
