= Ishiba Station =

Railway station in Ōtsu, Shiga Prefecture, Japan

Ishiba Station 石場駅
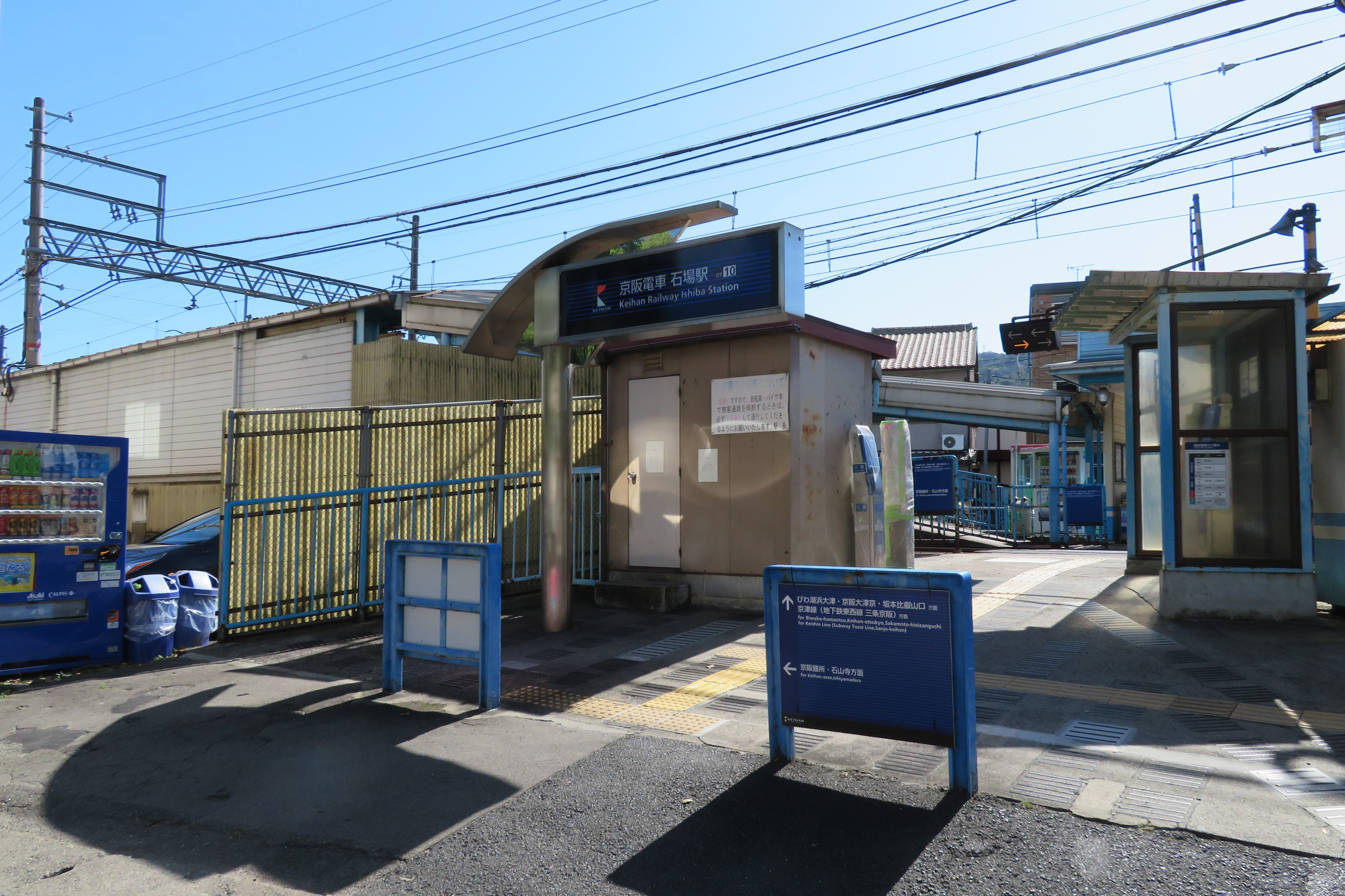
- Ishiba Station, September 2019

General information
- Location: 15, Matsumoto 2-chome, Ōtsu-shi, Shiga-ken 520-0807; Japan
- Coordinates: 35°00′18″N 135°52′31″E
- Operator: Keihan Electric Railway
- Line: Ishiyama Sakamoto Line
- Distance: 5.5 km from Ishiyamadera
- Platforms: 2 side platforms

Other information
- Station code: OT10
- Website: Official website

History
- Opened: March 1, 1913

Passengers
- FY2018: 1619 daily (boarding)

Services
Preceding station	Keihan Electric Railway	Following station
Keihan Zeze towards Ishiyamadera	Ishiyama Sakamoto Line	Shimanoseki towards Sakamoto-hieizanguchi
Location
- Location within Shiga Prefecture Location within Japan

Ishiba Station (石場駅, Ishiba-eki) is a passenger railway station located in the city of Ōtsu, Shiga Prefecture, Japan, operated by the private railway company Keihan Electric Railway.

== Lines ==
Ishiba Station is a station of the Ishiyama Sakamoto Line, and is 5.5 kilometers from the terminus of the line at Ishiyamadera.

== Station layout ==
The station consists of two opposed unnumbered side platforms connected by a level crossing. The station is unattended.

== Platforms ==
Station side	■ Ishiyama Sakamoto Line	for Biwako-Hamaōtsu and Sakamoto-hieizanguchi
Opposite side	■ Ishiyama Sakamoto Line	for Ishiyamadera

== History ==
Ishiba Station was opened on March 1, 1913.

== Passenger statistics ==
In fiscal 2018, the station was used by an average of 1619 passengers daily (boarding passengers only).

== Surrounding area ==
- Shiga Labor Bureau
- Otsu Labor Standards Inspection Office
- Otsu Public Employment Security Office

== See also ==
- List of railway stations in Japan
