= Shimanoseki Station =

Railway station in Ōtsu, Shiga Prefecture, Japan

Shimanoseki Station 島ノ関駅
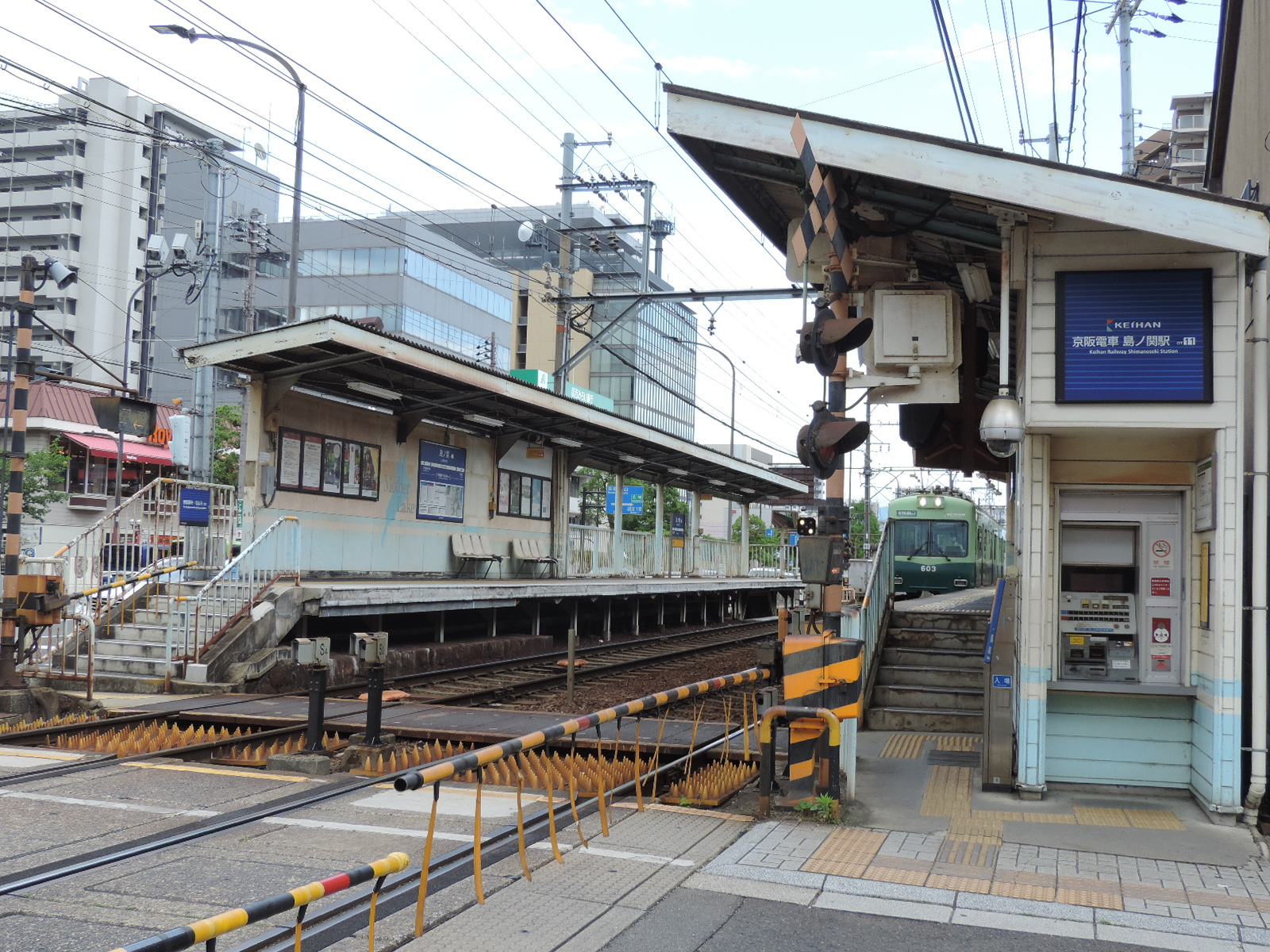
- Shimanoseki Station, May 2020

General information
- Location: 10-7 Shimanoseki, Ōtsu-shi, Shiga-ken 520-0043; Japan
- Coordinates: 35°00′28″N 135°52′14″E
- Operator: Keihan Electric Railway
- Line: Ishiyama Sakamoto Line
- Distance: 6.0 km from Ishiyamadera
- Platforms: 2 side platforms

Other information
- Station code: OT11
- Website: Official website

History
- Opened: March 1, 1913

Passengers
- FY2018: 1121 daily (boarding)

Services
Preceding station	Keihan Electric Railway	Following station
Ishiba towards Ishiyamadera	Ishiyama Sakamoto Line	Biwako-hamaotsu towards Sakamoto-hieizanguchi
Location
- Location within Shiga Prefecture Location within Japan

Shimanoseki Station (島ノ関駅, Shimanoseki-eki) is a passenger railway station located in the city of Ōtsu, Shiga Prefecture, Japan, operated by the private railway company Keihan Electric Railway.

== Lines ==
Shimanoseki Station is a station of the Ishiyama Sakamoto Line, and is 6.0 kilometers from the terminus of the line at Ishiyamadera.

== Station layout ==
The station consists of two opposed unnumbered side platforms connected by a level crossing. The station is unattended.

== Platforms ==
Station side	■ Ishiyama Sakamoto Line	for Biwako-Hamaōtsu and Sakamoto-hieizanguchi
Opposite side	■ Ishiyama Sakamoto Line	for Ishiyamadera

== History ==
Shimanoseki Station was opened on March 1, 1913.

== Passenger statistics ==
In fiscal 2018, the station was used by an average of 1121 passengers daily (boarding passengers only).

== Surrounding area ==
- Shiga Prefectural Police Headquarters / Shiga Prefectural Public Safety Commission
- Shiga Prefectural Lake Biwa Cultural Center
- Lake Otsu Nagisa Park
- Otsu Civic Hall
- Otsu City Chuo Elementary School

== See also ==
- List of railway stations in Japan
