= Keihan-otsukyo Station =

Railway station in Ōtsu, Shiga Prefecture, Japan

Keihan-otsukyo Station 京阪大津京駅
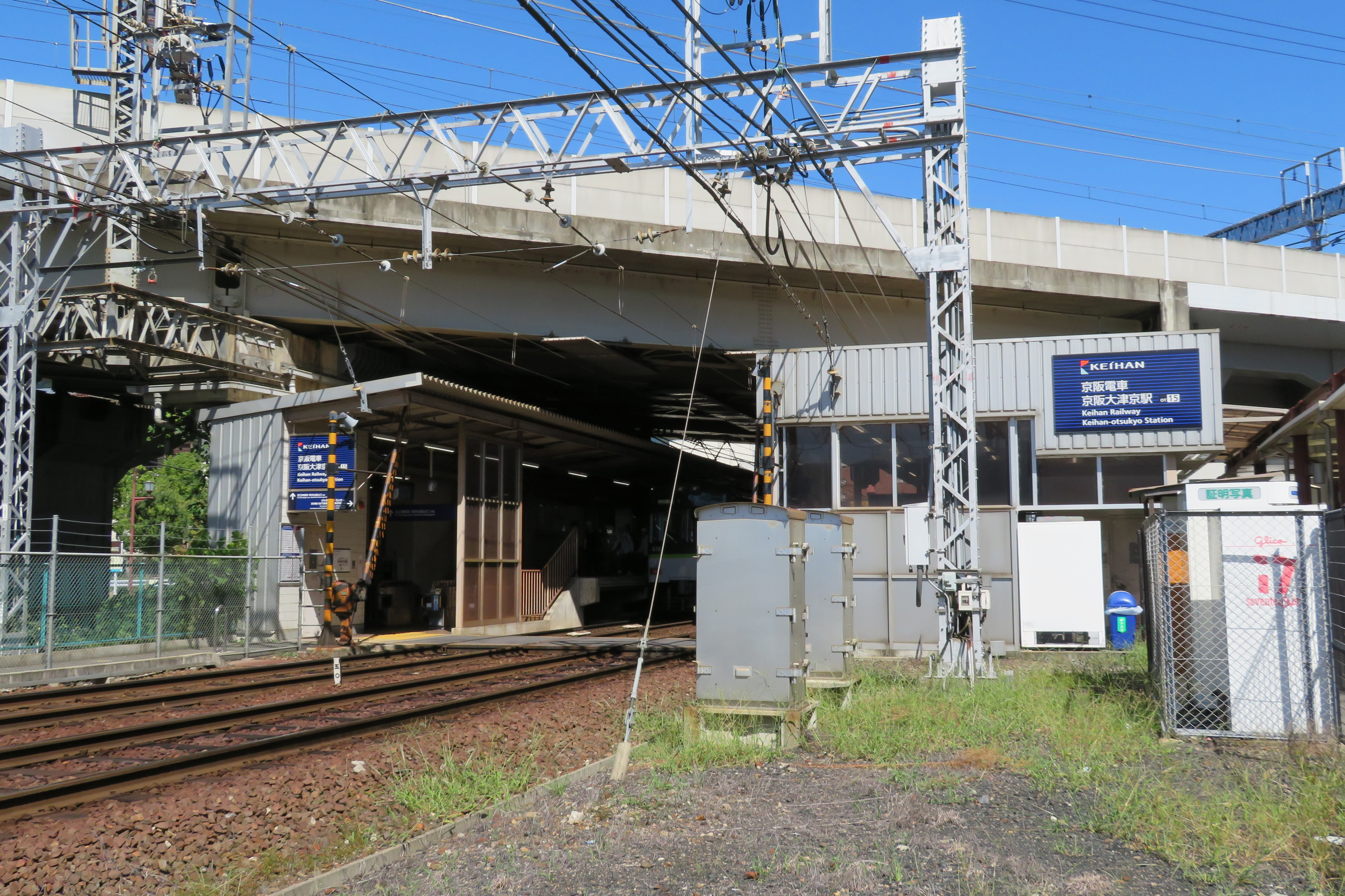
- Keihan Otsukyo station beneath the Kosei Line

General information
- Location: 5, Ōjigaoka 2-chome, Ōtsu-shi, Shiga-ken 520-0025; Japan
- Coordinates: 35°1′23.35″N 135°51′19.83″E
- Operator: Keihan Electric Railway
- Line: Ishiyama Sakamoto Line
- Distance: 8.5 km from Ishiyamadera
- Platforms: 2 side platforms

Other information
- Station code: OT15
- Website: Official website

History
- Opened: March 1, 1946
- Former names: Ōjiyama (until 2018)

Passengers
- FY2018: 2997 daily (boarding)

Services
Preceding station	Keihan Electric Railway	Following station
Otsu-shiyakusho-mae towards Ishiyamadera	Ishiyama Sakamoto Line	Ōmijingūmae towards Sakamoto-hieizanguchi
Location
- Location within Shiga Prefecture Location within Japan

Keihan-otsukyo Station (京阪大津京駅, Keihan-Ōtsukyō-eki)is a passenger railway station located in the city of Ōtsu, Shiga Prefecture, Japan, operated by the private railway company Keihan Electric Railway. The station is located underneath the elevated tracks of the Kosei Line of West Japan Railway Company, and passenger interchange is possible with JR West Ōtsukyō Station, although the stations are not physically connected.

== Lines ==
Keihan-otsukyo Station is a station of the Ishiyama Sakamoto Line, and is 8.5 kilometers from the terminus of the line at Ishiyamadera.

== Station layout ==
The station consists of two opposed unnumbered side platforms connected by a level crossing. The station is unattended.

== Platforms ==
station side	■ Ishiyama Sakamoto Line	for Biwako-Hamaōtsu and Ishiyamadera
opposite side	■ Ishiyama Sakamoto Line	for Sakamoto-hieizanguchi

== History ==
The station opened on March 1, 1946 as Ōjiyama Station (皇子山駅, Ōjiyama-eki). The station was constructed at the middle position of two closed stations: Yamagami Station (山上駅), suspended on May 15, 1945 and closed upon the opening of Ōjiyama Station, and Sazanami Station (漣駅), closed on August 15, 1944. Due to a road construction project, the station was moved 52 meters north to the present location on March 18, 2006 from the original location.

The station name was changed to Keihan-otsukyo on March 17, 2018.

== Passenger statistics ==
In fiscal 2018, the station was used by an average of 2997 passengers daily (boarding passengers only).

== Surrounding area ==
- JR West Ōtsukyō Station
- Ōjiyama Sports Park
- Biwako Boat Racecourse
- Otsu Municipal Prince Yama Junior High School

== See also ==
- List of railway stations in Japan
