= Ishiba =

Ishiba may refer to:

== Places ==
- Ishiba Station, a train station in Shiga Prefecture, Japan
- Lake Ishiba Ng'andu, a lake in Zambia

== People ==
- Jirō Ishiba (石破 二朗; 1908–1981), Japanese bureaucrat and politician
- Shigeru Ishiba (石破 茂; born 1957), Japanese politician
- Yoshiko Ishiba (石破 佳子; born 1956), the wife of Shigeru Ishiba, the former prime minister of Japan
