= Clipped compound =

Form of linguistic clipping for a compound term

In linguistics, a clipped compound is a word produced from a compound word by reducing its parts while retaining the meaning of the original compound. It is a special case of a type of word formation called clipping.

Clipped compounds are common in various slang and jargon vocabularies, but they are not specific to those. Examples in English include sci fi, comp sci, lab tech, and surg tech.

== Definition ==
A clipped compound word is linguistically a type of blend word. The nature of its morphology and orthography (i.e., solid, hyphenated, or open compound) is subject to the linguistic forces seen with other compounds. Like other blends, clipped compounds may be made of two or more components. However, a blend may have a meaning independent of its components' meanings (e.g., motel <— motor + hotel), while in a clipped compound the components already serve the function of producing a compound meaning (for instance, pulmotor <— pulmonary + motor). In addition, a clipped compound may drop one component completely: hard instead of hard labor, or mother for motherfucker (a process called ellipsis). Laurie Bauer suggests the following ad hoc distinction for English: If the word has compound stress, it is a clipped compound; if it has single-word stress, it is a blend.

The meaning of clipped compound may overlap with that of acronym.

== In other languages ==
In the Russian language, a clipped compound may acquire one or more extra suffixes that indicate the intended grammatical form of the formed word. In particular, the suffix -k is commonly used, for example, in askorbinka (from askorbinovaya kislota (i.e., ascorbic acid)).

In Japanese, clipped compounds are very commonly used to shorten long, either coined or wholly borrowed, compounds (see also Japanese phonology and transcription into Japanese). For instance, a word processor (ワードプロセッサ wādo purosessa) may be referred to as simply ワープロ wāpuro, sexual harassment (セクシャルハラスメント sekusharu harasumento) as セクハラ sekuhara, the program Clip Studio Paint (クリップスタジオペイント Kurippu Sutajio Peinto) as クリスタ Kurisuta, the video game series Monster Hunter (モンスターハンター Monsutā Hantā) as モンハン Monhan, the United Nations (国際連合 Kokusai Rengō) as 国連 Kokuren, and the Soviet Union (ソビエト連邦 Sobieto Renpō) as ソ連 Soren.

In Hebrew, there are many words that are clipped compounds and other types of abbreviations. Since in the Hebrew writing system the vowels are usually omitted, the resulting word may sound differently: "mabas" for "base commander" is made of מפקד הבסיס ("mefaked basis"). Another example: רמזור (traffic light) is רמז (hint) plus אור (light).

== Clipped compound place names ==
Clipped compounds are sometimes used in place names in various languages. Below is a non-exhaustive list of examples.

- English: The Delmarva Peninsula is named for the US states of Delaware, Maryland, and Virginia (from the traditional abbreviation Va.). The names of several Manhattan neighborhoods are clipped compounds, including Soho ("South of Houston"), Noho ("North of Houston"), Tribeca ("Triangle Below Canal Street"), Nolita ("North of Little Italy") and Nomad ("North of Madison Square").
- Chinese: The Chinese city of Wuhan takes its name from a clipped compound of the "Three Towns of Wuhan": Wuchang contributes "Wu", whereas Hankou and Hanyang both contribute "Han."
- Japanese: Japanese place names are often combined in a clipped compound with alternative readings of the characters. This is especially common for combined regions or for train line names. Most often the kan-on readings (most common readings in kanji compounds) are used for the compounds, while the place names often use other readings. For example, the Kyoto (京都, Kyōto) and Osaka (大阪, Ōsaka) region is called Keihan (京阪, Keihan), as is a major train line connecting them (Keihan Electric Railway), replacing the go-on reading kyō (京) and kun'yomi saka (阪) with the kan-on readings kei (京) and han (阪). The larger region, including Kobe (神戸, Kōbe), is similarly called Keihanshin (京阪神, Keihanshin), the go-on reading shin (神) replacing the kun'yomi kō (神).
- Korean: Seven of the historical Eight Provinces of Korea—all except Gyeonggi—were named by combining the initial Hanja characters of two major cities. These were Chungcheong (Chungju + Cheongju), Gyeongsang (Gyeongju + Sangju), Jeolla (Jeonju + Naju), Gangwon (Gangneung + Wonju), Pyongan (Pyongyang + Anju), Hwanghae (Hwangju + Haeju), and Hamgyong (Hamhung + Kyongsong).
- Multi-lingual: The Benelux Union takes its name from its component nations, Belgium, Netherlands, and Luxembourg.
- The African country Tanzania has a name that combines the names of the two states that unified to create the country: Tanganyika and Zanzibar.

== See also ==
- Portmanteau
- Syllabic abbreviation
