= Keihan Zeze Station =

Railway station in Ōtsu, Shiga Prefecture, Japan

Keihan Zeze Station 京阪膳所駅
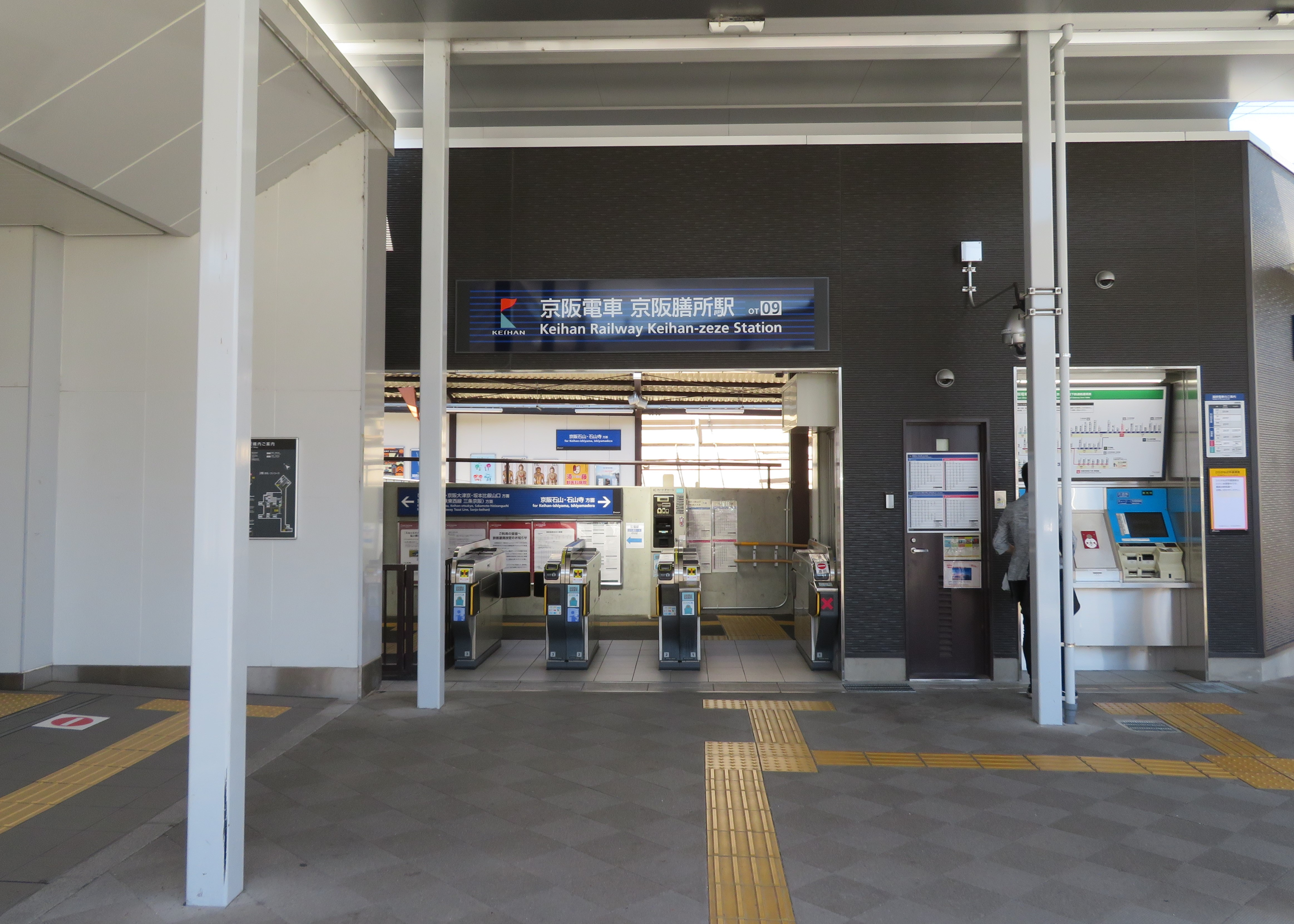
- Keihan Zeze Station, September 2019

General information
- Location: 2-11, Banba-chō, Ōtsu-shi, Shiga-ken 520-0802; Japan
- Coordinates: 34°59′51″N 135°53′09″E
- Operator: Keihan Electric Railway
- Line: Ishiyama Sakamoto Line
- Distance: 4.7 km from Ishiyamadera
- Platforms: 2 side platforms

Other information
- Station code: OT08
- Website: Official website

History
- Opened: March 1, 1913
- Former names: Banba (to 1937): Zeze-ekimae (to 1951)

Passengers
- FY2018: 2762 daily (boarding)

Services
Preceding station	Keihan Electric Railway	Following station
Nishiki towards Ishiyamadera	Ishiyama Sakamoto Line	Ishiba towards Sakamoto-hieizanguchi
Location
- Location within Shiga Prefecture Location within Japan

Keihan Zeze Station (京阪膳所駅, Keihan Zeze-eki) is a passenger railway station located in the city of Ōtsu, Shiga Prefecture, Japan, operated by the private railway company Keihan Electric Railway. It is located adjacent to the JR West Zeze Station, but the two stations are not physically connected and there is no interchange between stations.

== Lines ==
Keihan Zeze Station is a station of the Ishiyama Sakamoto Line, and is 4.7 kilometers from the terminus of the line at Ishiyamadera.

== Station layout ==
The station consists of two opposed unnumbered side platforms connected by a level crossing. The station is unattended.

== Platforms ==
Station side	■ Ishiyama Sakamoto Line	for Biwako-Hamaōtsu and Sakamoto-hieizanguchi
Opposite side	■ Ishiyama Sakamoto Line	for Ishiyamadera

== History ==
Keihan Zeze Station was opened on March 1, 1913 as Banba Station (馬場駅, Banba-eki). At the time, the current JR West Zeze Station was called "Ōtsu Station", so this station was sometimes referred to as Ōtsu-ekimae Station (大津駅前駅, Ōtsu-ekimae-eki). The station was renamed Zeze-ekimae Station (膳所駅前駅, Zeze-ekimae-eki) on August 20, 1937. It was renamed to its present name on April 1, 1953.

== Passenger statistics ==
In fiscal 2018, the station was used by an average of 2762 passengers daily (boarding passengers only).

== Surrounding area ==
- Gichū-ji, National Historic Site
- Shiga Prefectural Otsu High School
- Otsu Municipal Hirano Elementary School

== See also ==
- List of railway stations in Japan
