= Keihan-ishiyama Station =

Railway station in Ōtsu, Shiga Prefecture, Japan

Keihan-ishiyama Station 京阪石山駅
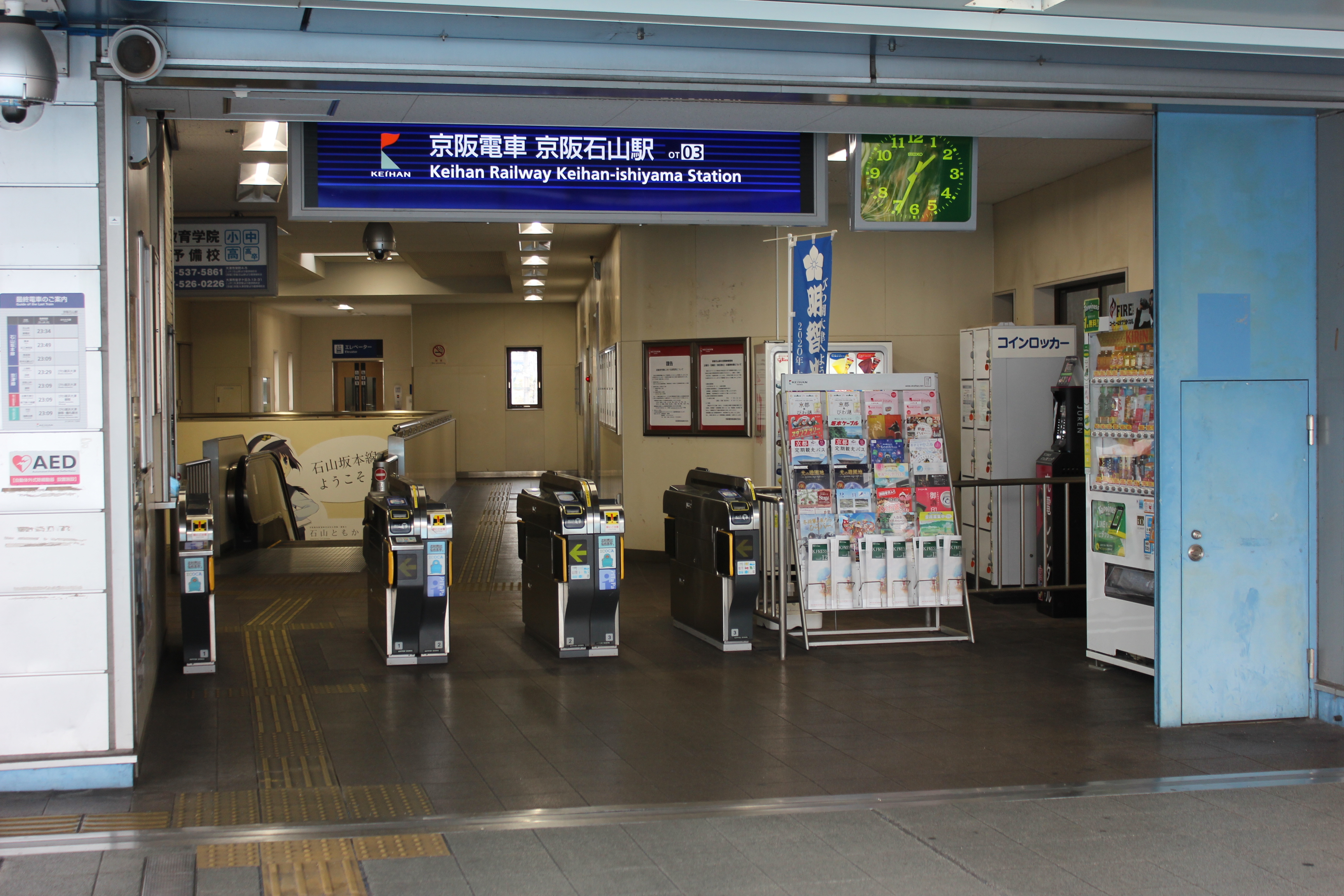
- Keihan-ishiyama Station, December 2020

General information
- Location: 2 Awazuchō, Ōtsu-shi, Shiga-ken 520-0832; Japan
- Coordinates: 34°59′51″N 135°53′09″E
- Operator: Keihan Electric Railway
- Line: Ishiyama Sakamoto Line
- Distance: 1.6 km from Ishiyamadera
- Platforms: 1 island platform

Other information
- Station code: OT03
- Website: Official website

History
- Opened: January 12, 1914
- Former names: Ishiyama-ekimae (to 1953)

Passengers
- FY2018: 3481 daily (boarding)

Services
Preceding station	Keihan Electric Railway	Following station
Karahashimae towards Ishiyamadera	Ishiyama Sakamoto Line	Awazu towards Sakamoto-hieizanguchi
Location
- Location within Shiga Prefecture Location within Japan

Keihan-ishiyama Station (京阪石山駅, Keihan-ishiyama-eki) is a passenger railway station located in the city of Ōtsu, Shiga Prefecture, Japan, operated by the private railway company Keihan Electric Railway. The station is located adjacent to the JR West Ishiyama Station with which it is connected by a concourse.

== Lines ==
Keihan-ishiyama Station is a station of the Ishiyama Sakamoto Line, and is 1.6 kilometers from the terminus of the line at Ishiyamadera.

== Station layout ==
The station consists of one island platform with an elevated station building.

== Platforms ==
1	■ Ishiyama Sakamoto Line	for Biwako-Hamaōtsu and Sakamoto-hieizanguchi
2	■ Ishiyama Sakamoto Line	for Ishiyamadera

== History ==
Keihan-ishiyama Station was opened on January 12, 1914, as Ishiyama-ekimae Station (石山駅前駅). It was renamed to its present name on April 1, 1953. The station was relocated to its present location on March 1, 2005, and rebuilt as an elevated station building.

== Passenger statistics ==
In fiscal 2018, the station was used by an average of 3481 passengers daily (boarding passengers only).

== Surrounding area ==
- Renesas Semiconductor Manufacturing Shiga Factory (formerly Renesas Kansai Semiconductor)
- Japan National Route 1

== See also ==
- List of railway stations in Japan
