= Zeze Station =

Railway station in Ōtsu, Shiga Prefecture, Japan

Zeze Station 膳所駅
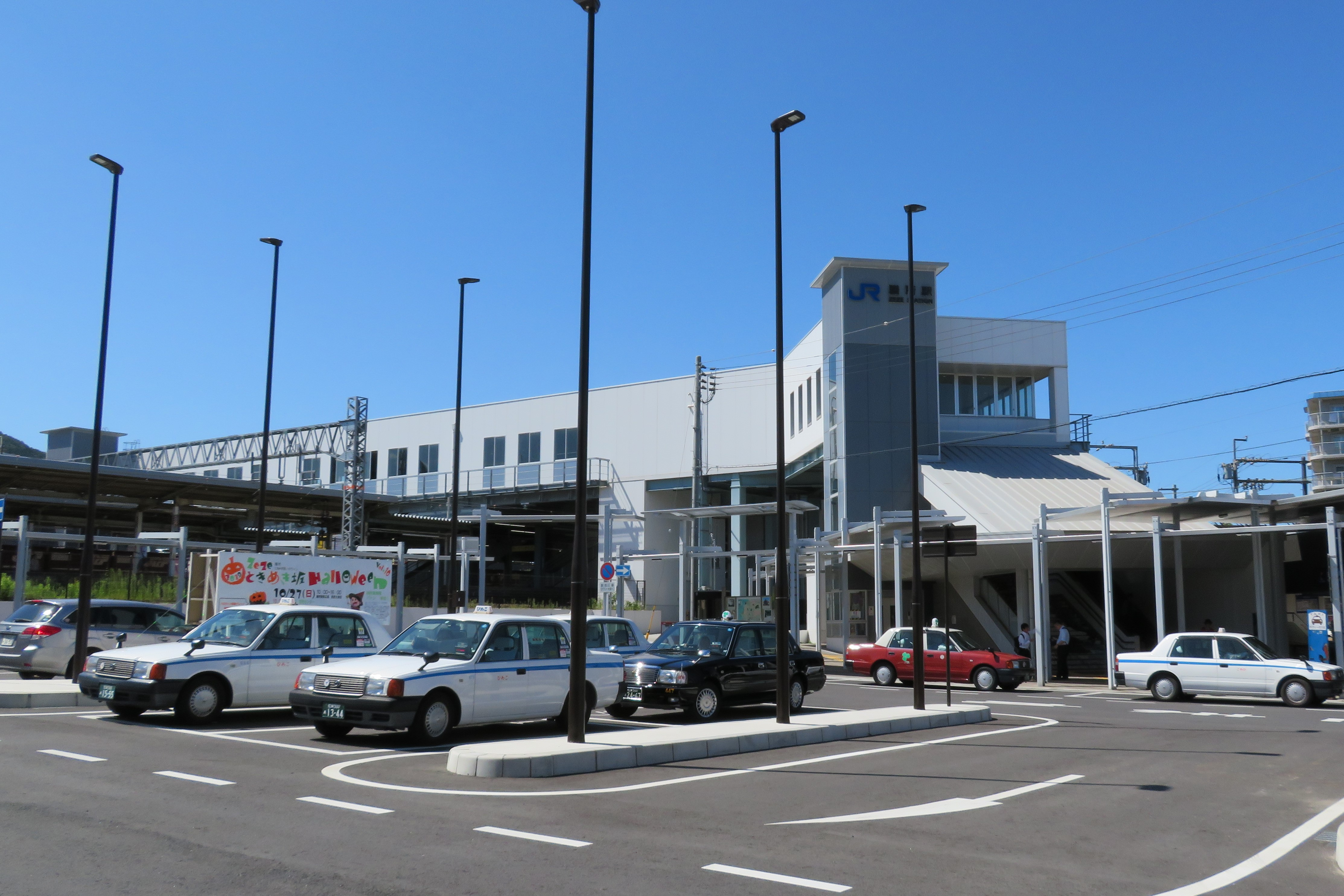
- Zeze Station North entrance, September 2019

General information
- Location: 2-11-8 Baba, Ōtsu-shi, Shiga-ken 520-0802; Japan
- Coordinates: 34°59′57.52″N 135°52′50.01″E
- Operator: JR West
- Line: Biwako Line
- Distance: 56.0 km from Maibara
- Platforms: 2 island platforms

Construction
- Structure type: Ground level
- Accessible: Yes

Other information
- Station code: JR-A28

History
- Opened: 12 August 1969
- Former names: Baba (until 1913; 1921-1934); Ōtsu (1913-1921)

Passengers
- FY 2023: 24,120 daily

Services
Preceding station	JR West	Following station
Ōtsu towards Kyoto	Biwako Line Local	Ishiyama towards Nagahama
Location
- Location within Shiga Prefecture Location within Japan

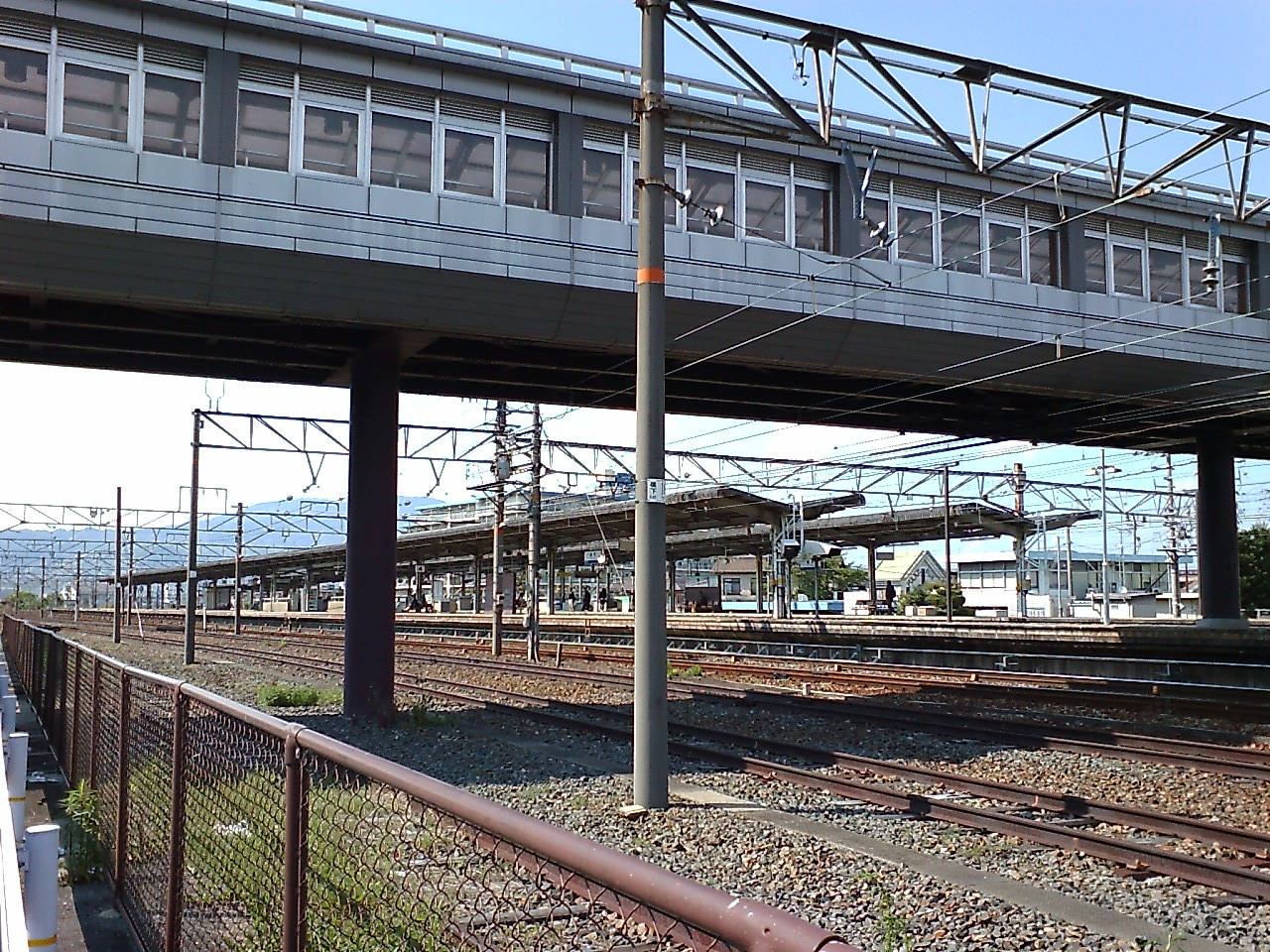
Zeze Station

Zeze Station (膳所駅, Zeze-eki) is a passenger railway station located in the city of Ōtsu, Shiga Prefecture, Japan, operated by the West Japan Railway Company (JR West). It is located adjacent to the privately operated Keihan Electric Railway Keihan Zeze Station, but the two stations are not physically connected and there is no interchange between stations.

== Lines ==
Zeze Station is served by the Biwako Line portion of the Tōkaidō Main Line, and is 56.0 kilometers from Maibara and 501.9 kilometers from Tokyo.

== Station layout ==
The station consists of two island platforms connected by an elevated station building. The station is staffed.

is a railway station in Ōtsu, Shiga, Japan. The station is on the Biwako Line (Tōkaidō Main Line) of West Japan Railway Company (JR West). In front of Zeze Station is Keihan Zeze Station (京阪膳所駅, Keihan Zeze-eki) on the Ishiyama-Sakamoto Line of Keihan Electric Railway. This article covers both stations.

== Platforms ==
1	■ Biwako Line	for Kusatsu and Maibara (partly) (Kusatsu Line) for Kusatsu and Kibukawa
2	■ Biwako Line	for Kusatsu and Maibara
3	■ Biwako Line	for Kyoto and Osaka (partly)
4	■ Biwako Line	for Kyoto and Osaka

== History ==
Zeze Station opened as Baba Station (馬場駅, Baba-eki) on the Japanese Government Railways (JGR) when the railway extended from Kyoto to the lakeside port of Ōtsu on 15 July 1880. At this time, the stations en route were (from Ōtsu) Ishiba, Baba, Yamashina, Ōtani and Inari. When the last section of the Tōkaidō railway completed on 1 July 1889, the railway from the east connected at Baba, leaving the branch between Baba and Ōtsu. On 1 June 1913, Ōtsu Station and Baba Station were renamed as Hamaōtsu and Ōtsu. On 1 August 1921, the new route between Ōtsu and Kyoto was opened. New Ōtsu Station and Yamashina Station opened en route and the former Ōtsu Station became a freight terminal with no passenger operations and reverted to its former name of Baba. Passenger services were resumed on 15 September 1934 with the station renamed to Zeze. The station came under the control of JR West with the privatization of the Japan National Railway on 1 April 1987.

Station numbering was introduced to the station in March 2018 with Zeze being assigned station number JR-A28.

== Passenger statistics ==
In fiscal 2019, the station was used by an average of 12,915 passengers (boarding passengers only) in 2019, making it the 26th-busiest station by traffic in the West Japan Railway Company's network.

== Surrounding area ==
- Japan National Route 1
- Keihan Zeze Station
- Shiga Prefectural Otsu High School
- Shiga Prefectural Otsu Seiryo High School Baba Branch School
- Shiga University Faculty of Education Junior High School / Elementary School

== See also ==
- List of railway stations in Japan
