= Keihan Ishiyama Sakamoto Line =

Railway line in Japan

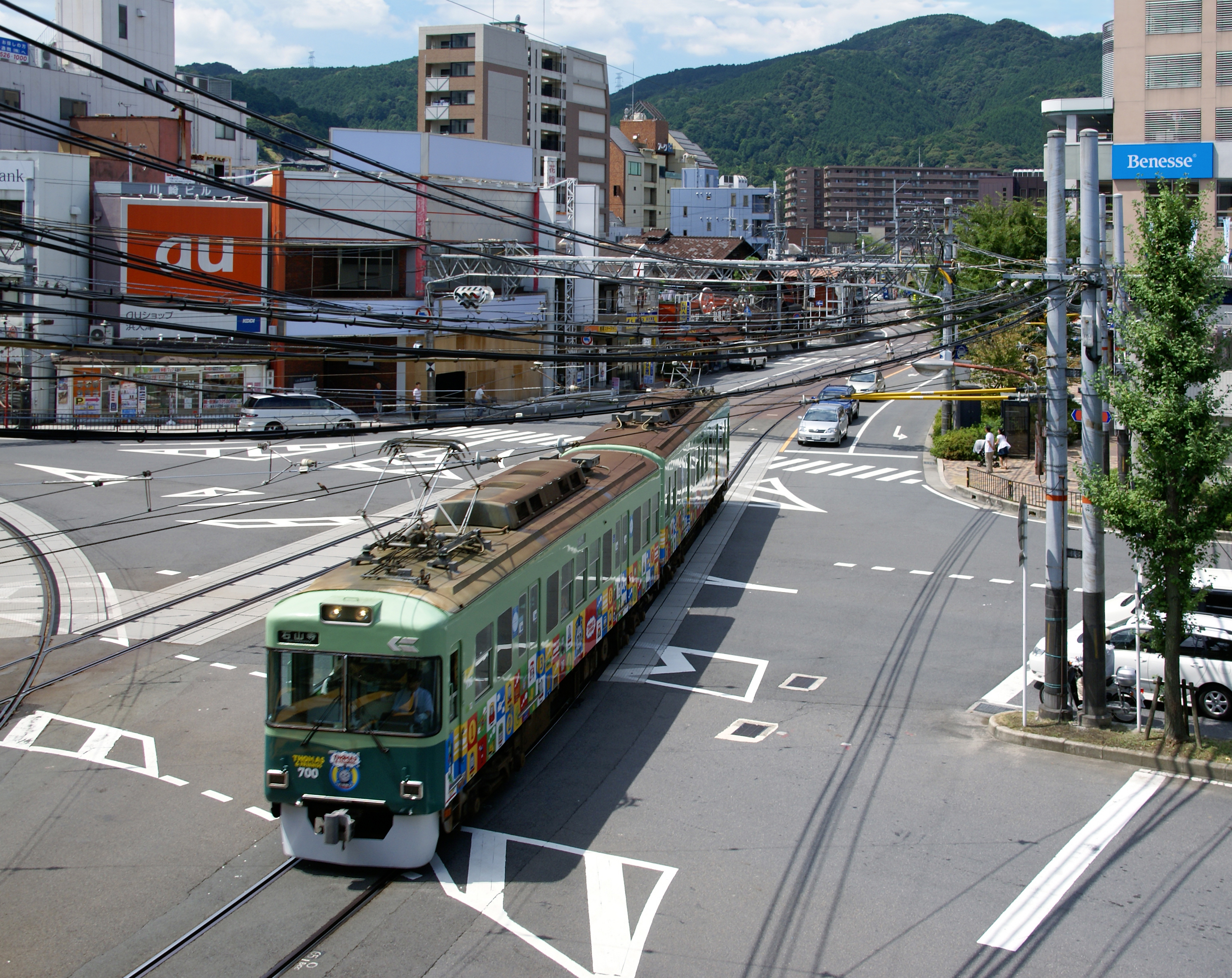
- An Ishiyamadera-bound train approaching Hamaōtsu Station

Overview
- Native name: 京阪石山坂本線
- Locale: Shiga Prefecture
- Termini: Ishiyamadera; Sakamoto-hieizanguchi
- Stations: 21

Service
- Operator(s): Keihan Electric Railway

History
- Opened: 1 March 1913

Technical
- Line length: 14.1 km (8.8 mi)
- Track gauge: 1,435 mm (4 ft 8 1/2 in)
- Electrification: 1,500 V DC overhead catenary
- Operating speed: 70 km/h (45 mph)
Route map

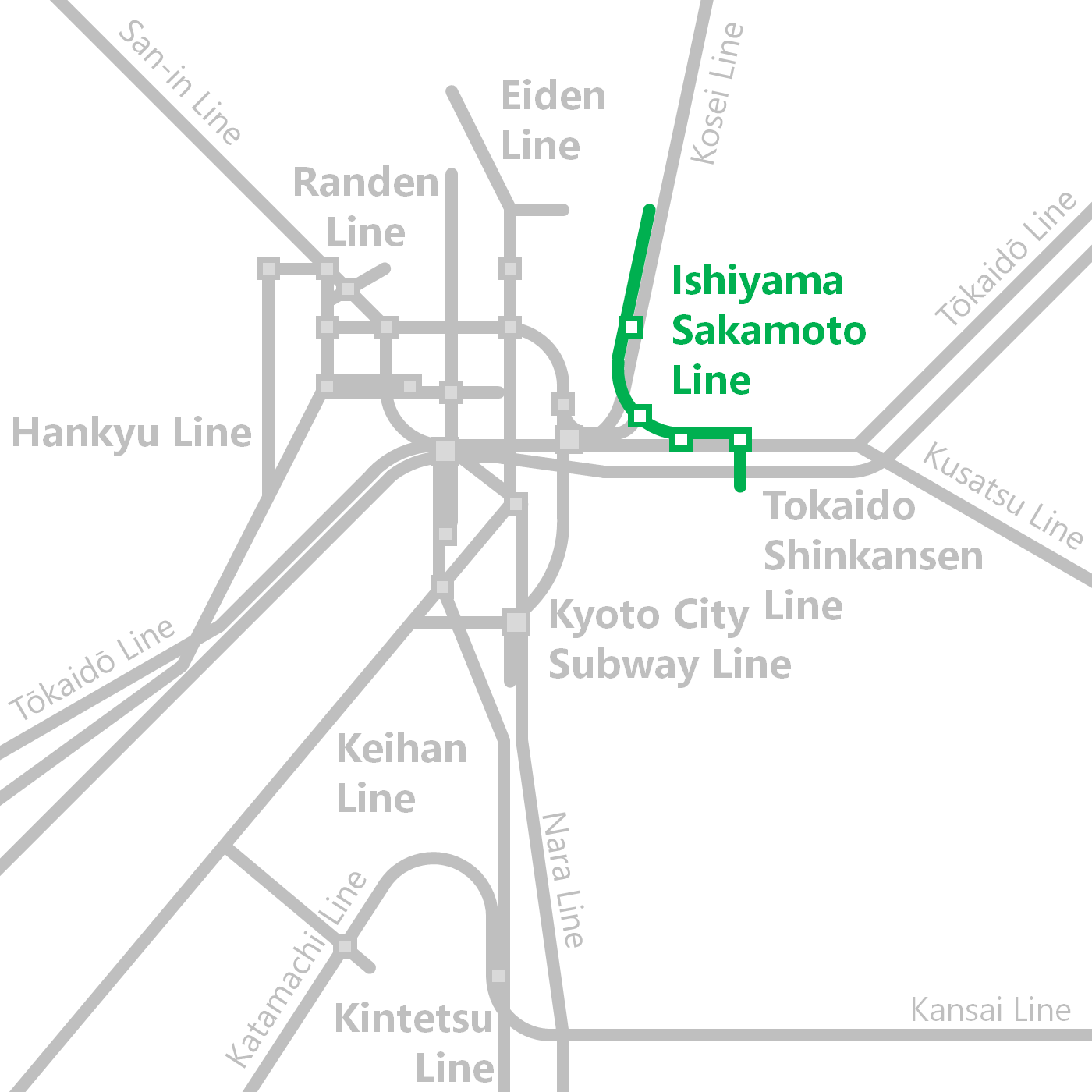
Railway map around Ishiyama Sakamoto Line

The Keihan Ishiyama Sakamoto Line (京阪石山坂本線, Keihan Ishiyama Sakamoto-sen) is a railway line in Shiga Prefecture, Japan, operated by the private railway operator Keihan Electric Railway.

== Stations ==
No.	Name	Japanese	Distance (km)		Transfers	Location
No.	Name	Japanese	Between stations	Total	Transfers	Location
OT01	Ishiyamadera	石山寺	-	0.0		Ōtsu, Shiga
OT02	Karahashimae	唐橋前	0.7	0.7		Ōtsu, Shiga
OT03	Keihan Ishiyama	京阪石山	0.9	1.6	A Biwako Line	Ōtsu, Shiga
OT04	Awazu	粟津	0.8	2.4		Ōtsu, Shiga
OT05	Kawaragahama	瓦ヶ浜	0.4	2.8		Ōtsu, Shiga
OT06	Nakanoshō	中ノ庄	0.5	3.3		Ōtsu, Shiga
OT07	Zezehommachi	膳所本町	0.5	3.8		Ōtsu, Shiga
OT08	Nishiki	錦	0.4	4.2		Ōtsu, Shiga
OT09	Keihan Zeze	京阪膳所	0.5	4.7	A Biwako Line	Ōtsu, Shiga
OT10	Ishiba	石場	0.8	5.5		Ōtsu, Shiga
OT11	Shimanoseki	島ノ関	0.5	6.0		Ōtsu, Shiga
OT12	Biwako-Hamaōtsu	びわ湖浜大津	0.7	6.7	■ Keihan Keishin Line	Ōtsu, Shiga
OT13	Miidera	三井寺	0.5	7.2		Ōtsu, Shiga
OT14	Otsu-shiyakusho-mae	大津市役所前	0.8	8.0		Ōtsu, Shiga
OT15	Keihan-otsukyo	京阪大津京	0.5	8.5	B Kosei Line	Ōtsu, Shiga
OT16	Ōmijingūmae	近江神宮前	0.6	9.1		Ōtsu, Shiga
OT17	Minami-Shiga	南滋賀	0.9	10.0		Ōtsu, Shiga
OT18	Shigasato	滋賀里	0.8	10.8		Ōtsu, Shiga
OT19	Anō	穴太	1.5	12.3		Ōtsu, Shiga
OT20	Matsunobamba	松ノ馬場	1.2	13.5		Ōtsu, Shiga
OT21	Sakamoto-hieizanguchi	坂本比叡山口	0.6	14.1	Sakamoto Cable	Ōtsu, Shiga

== History ==
The Otsu Railway opened the Hamaotsu to Awazu section in 1913, electrified at 600 V DC. The line was extended to Ishiyamadera (as single track) the following year.

The Hamaotsu to Miidera section opened in 1922 (dual track electrified), and in 1927 the company merged with a tourist boat operator to become the Biwako Railway & Steamship Co., which extended the line to Sakamoto the same year.

Keihan acquired the company in 1929 (and divested the steamship component immediately), connecting the line to its Keishin line in 1939.

The Awazu to Ishiyama section was double-tracked in 1943, but in 1945 the Sakamoto to Shigasato section was singled and the rails recycled for the Japanese war effort. The dual track was reinstated in 1947.

The voltage was increased to 1,500 V DC in conjunction with the voltage upgrade on the Keishin line.
