= Biwako-Hamaōtsu Station =

Railway station in Ōtsu, Shiga Prefecture, Japan

Biwako-Hamaotsu Station びわ湖浜大津駅
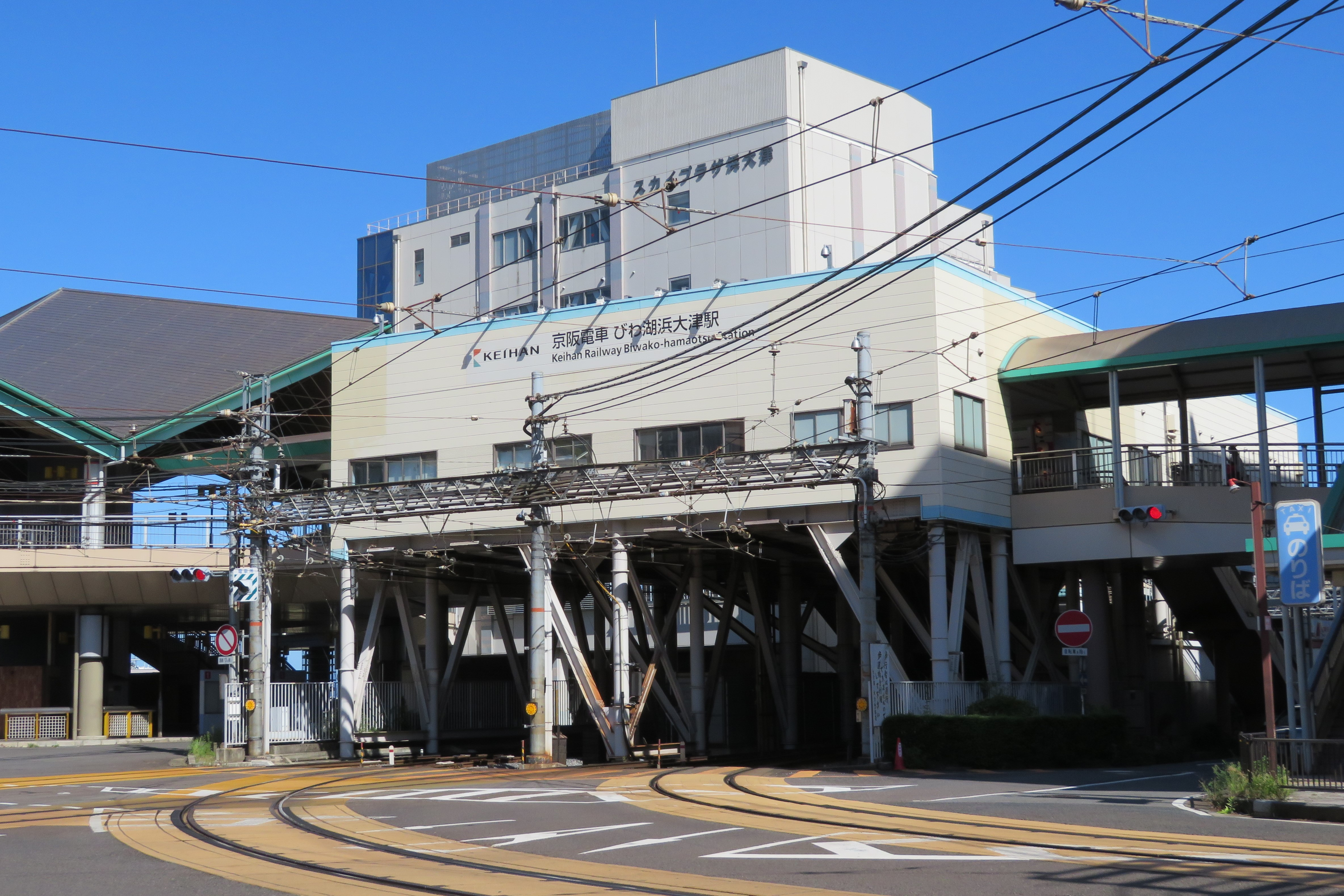
- Biwako-Hamaotsu Station

General information
- Location: 3-8, Hamaotsu Itchome, Ōtsu-shi, Shiga-ken 520-0047; Japan
- Coordinates: 35°0′40.88″N 135°51′49.82″E
- Operator: Keihan Electric Railway
- Lines: Keishin Line; Ishiyama Sakamoto Line
- Platforms: 2 island platforms

Other information
- Station code: OT12
- Website: Official website

History
- Opened: July 15, 1880
- Former names: Ōtsu (until 1913); Hamaōtsu (until 2018)

Passengers
- FY2018: 3,008 daily (boarding)

Services
Preceding station	Keihan Electric Railway	Following station
Kamisakaemachi towards Misasagi	Keishin Line	Terminus
Shimanoseki towards Ishiyamadera	Ishiyama Sakamoto Line	Miidera towards Sakamoto-hieizanguchi
Location
- Location within Shiga Prefecture Location within Japan

Biwako-Hamaōtsu Station (びわ湖浜大津駅, Biwako-Hamaōtsu-eki) is a junction passenger railway station located in the city of Ōtsu, Shiga Prefecture, Japan, operated by the private railway company Keihan Electric Railway.

== Lines ==
Biwako-Hamaōtsu Station is a station of the Ishiyama Sakamoto Line, and is 6.7 kilometers from the terminus of the line at Ishiyamadera. It is also a station of the Keihan Keishin Line, and is 7.5 kilometers from the terminus of that line at Misasagi.

== Station layout ==
The station consists of two island platforms connected by an elevated station building.

== Platforms ==
1	■ Ishiyama Sakamoto Line	for Sakamoto-hieizanguchi
	■ Keishin Line	for Misasagi, Sanjō-Keihan, Kyōtoshiyakusho-mae, Uzumasa Tenjingawa
2	■ Ishiyama Sakamoto Line	for Keihan Zeze, Keihan Ishiyama, Ishiyamadera
	■ Keishin Line	for terminating trains

== History ==
Biwako-Hamaōtsu Station was opened on July 15, 1880 as Ōtsu Station (大津駅, Ōtsu-eki) on the Japanese Government Railways (JGR) Tōkaidō Main Line . The private Ōtsu Electric Railway began operations to the station in 1913, the same year that the Tōkaidō Main Line was rerouted to bypass this station and JGR operations ceased. The station was renamed Hamaōtsu Station (浜大津駅, Hamaōtsu-eki) on June 1, 1913. It was renamed again to its present name on March 17, 2018.

=== Past lines (Ōtsu Station) ===
«	Service	»
JGR Tōkaidō Line Branch
Zeze	-	Terminus
Kōjaku Railway
Zeze	-	Miidera-shita

== Passenger statistics ==
In fiscal 2018, the station was used by an average of 3008 passengers daily (boarding passengers only).

== Surrounding area ==
- Otsu Port
- Former Otsu Public Hall
- Shiga Prefectural Road 558 Takashima Otsu Line
- Shiga Prefectural Road No. 18 Otsu Kusatsu Linehool

== See also ==
- List of railway stations in Japan
