= Sakamoto-hieizanguchi Station =

Railway station in Ōtsu, Shiga Prefecture, Japan

Sakamoto-hieizanguchi Station 坂本比叡山口駅
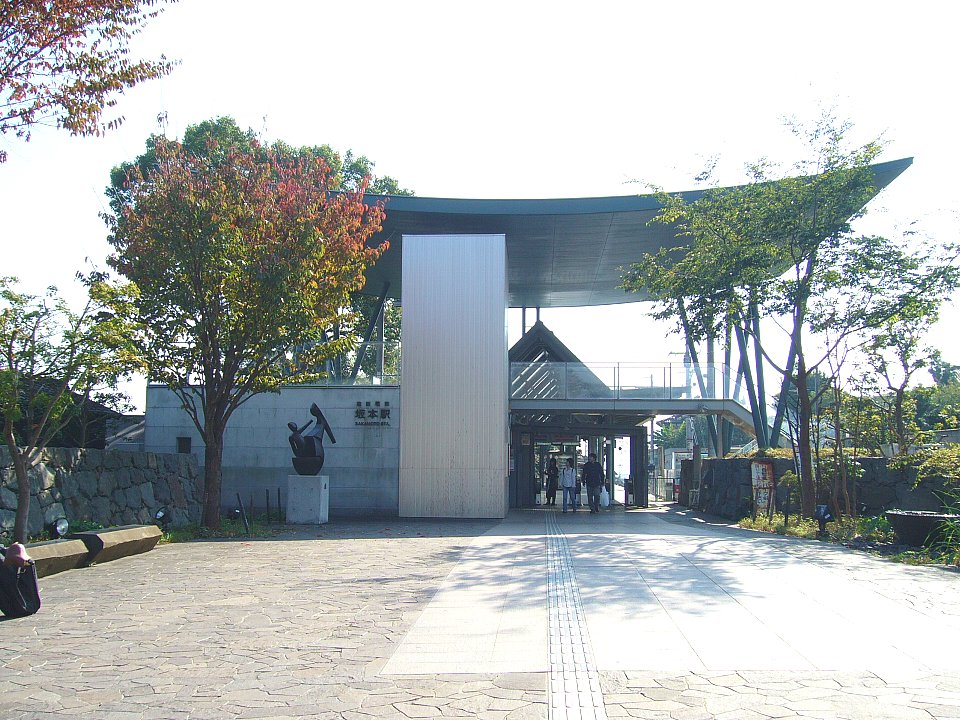
- Sakamoto-hieizanguchi Station

General information
- Location: 4-12 Sakamoto, Ōtsu-shi, Shiga-ken 520-0113; Japan
- Coordinates: 35.070778°N 135.871290°E
- Operator: Keihan Electric Railway
- Line: Ishiyama Sakamoto Line
- Distance: 14.1 km from Ishiyamadera
- Platforms: 1 bay platform

Other information
- Station code: OT21
- Website: Official website

History
- Opened: August 13, 1927
- Former names: Sakamoto (until 2008)

Passengers
- FY2018: 1236 daily (boarding)

Services
Preceding station	Keihan Electric Railway	Following station
Matsunobamba towards Ishiyamadera	Ishiyama Sakamoto Line	Terminus
Location
- Location within Shiga Prefecture Location within Japan

Sakamoto-hieizanguchi Station (坂本比叡山口駅, Sakamoto-Hieizanguchi-eki) is a passenger railway station located in the city of Ōtsu, Shiga Prefecture, Japan, operated by the private railway company Keihan Electric Railway. The Sakamoto Cable runs from Cable Sakamoto Station which is about 15 minutes walk from this station.

== Lines ==
Sakamoto-hieizanguchi Station is the terminal station of the Ishiyama Sakamoto Line, and is 14.1 kilometers from the opposing terminus of the line at Ishiyamadera.

== Station layout ==
The station consists of one bay platform serving two tracks.

== Platforms ==
1, 2	■ Ishiyama Sakamoto Line	for Biwako-Hamaōtsu and Ishiyamadera

== History ==
Sakamoto-hieizanguchi Station was opened on August 13, 1927 as Sakamoto Station (坂本駅, Sakamoto-eki). It was renamed to its present name on March 17, 2008.

== Passenger statistics ==
In fiscal 2018, the station was used by an average of 1236 passengers daily (boarding passengers only).

== Surrounding area ==
- Hiyoshi Taisha Shrine
- Hiyoshi Tosho-gu
- JR Hieizan Sakamoto Station
- Hieizan Railway Cable Sakamoto Station
- Enkeiji Gakuen Hieizan Junior High School / High School, Eizan Gakuin
- Otsu City Sakamoto Elementary School

== See also ==
- List of railway stations in Japan
