= Ishiyamadera Station =

Railway station in Ōtsu, Shiga Prefecture, Japan

Ishiyamadera Station 石山寺駅
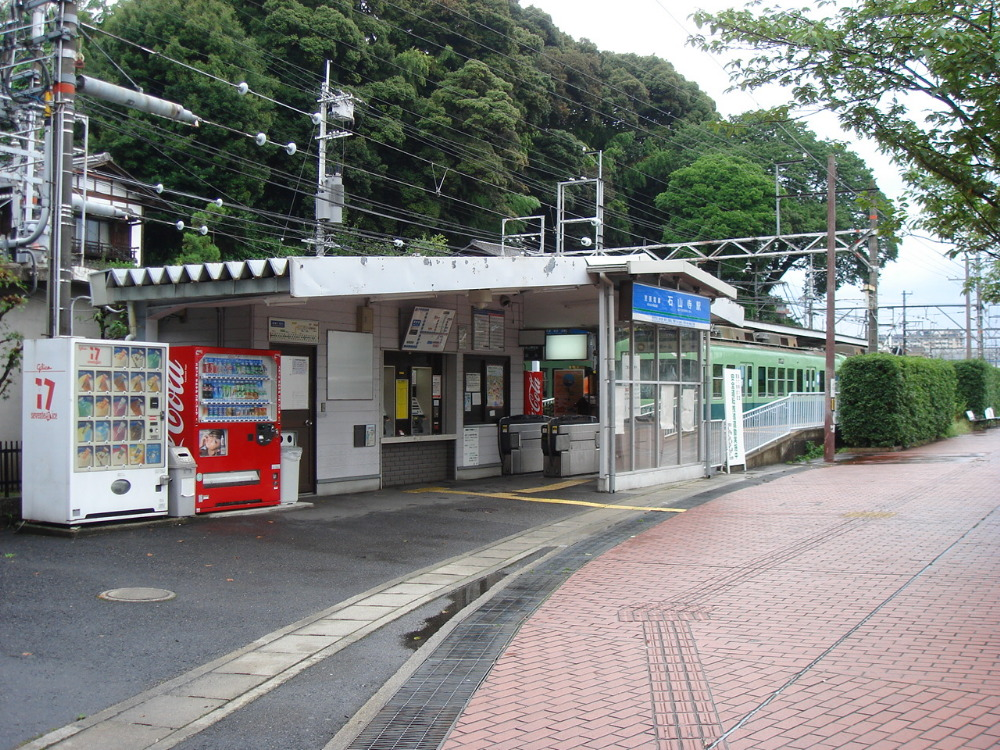
- Shimanoseki Station, May 2020

General information
- Location: 5, Hotarudani, Ōtsu-shi, Shiga-ken 520-0853; Japan
- Coordinates: 34°58′01″N 135°54′12″E
- Operator: Keihan Electric Railway
- Line: Ishiyama Sakamoto Line
- Distance: 14.1 km from Sakamoto-hieizanguchi
- Platforms: 2 bay platforms

Other information
- Station code: OT01
- Website: Official website

History
- Opened: February 15, 1914
- Former names: Ishiyama (to 1937); Ishiyama-Hotarudani (1950-1953)

Passengers
- FY2018: 1121 daily (boarding)

Services
| Preceding station | Keihan Electric Railway | Following station |
|---|---|---|
| Terminus | Ishiyama Sakamoto Line | Karahashimae towards Sakamoto-hieizanguchi |
Location
- Location within Shiga Prefecture Location within Japan

Ishiyamadera Station (石山寺駅, Ishiyamadera-eki) is a passenger railway station located in the city of Ōtsu, Shiga Prefecture, Japan, operated by the private railway company Keihan Electric Railway.

== Lines ==
Ishiyamadera Station is a terminal station of the Ishiyama Sakamoto Line, and is 14.1 kilometers from the opposing terminus of the line at Sakamoto-hieizanguchi.

== Station layout ==
The station consists of two bay platforms serving three tracks.

=== Platforms ===
| 1, 2 | ■ Ishiyama Sakamoto Line | for Biwako-Hamaōtsu and Sakamoto-hieizanguchi |

== History ==
Ishiyamadera Station was opened on February 15, 1914, as Ishiyama Station (石山駅, Ishiyama-eki). It was renamed to its present name on August 20, 1937. On October 1, 1950, it was renamed Ishiyama-Hotarudani Station (石山蛍谷駅, Ishiyama-Hotarudani-eki), but reverted to Ishiyamadera Station on April 1, 1953.

== Passenger statistics ==
In fiscal 2018, the station was used by an average of 1236 passengers daily (boarding passengers only).

== Surrounding area ==
- Ishiyama-dera
- Ishiyama Onsen
- Shiga Prefectural Ishiyama High School

== See also ==
- List of railway stations in Japan
