= Kinugawa temple ruins =

Archeological site in Ōtsu, Japan

- 衣川廃寺跡 (Japanese)
- Kinugawa temple ruins Kinugawa temple ruins (Japan)
- 35°06′36″N 135°54′23″E
- Type: temple ruins
- Periods: Asuka period
- Location: Ōtsu, Shiga, Japan
- Region: Kansai region

Site notes
- Public access: Yes (no public facilities)

The Kinugawa temple ruins (衣川廃寺跡, Kinugawa Haiji ato) is an archaeological site with the ruins of an Asuka period Buddhist temple located in the Kinugawa neighborhood of the city of Ōtsu, Shiga Prefecture, in the Kansai region of Japan. The site was designated a National Historic Site of Japan in 1977.

== Overview ==
Kinugawa temple ruins site is located at the narrowest point of Lake Biwa, at an elevation of 100 meters above sea level, or three meters above the surrounding paddy fields. The site is on a hill which has been artificially flattened and filled to make the temple precincts. From archaeological evidence it is believed to have been built in the latter half of the Asuka period (mid 7th century AD), and is thus one of the oldest Buddhist temple sites in Ōmi Province. It appears to have consisted of two buildings built on rammed earth platforms. The northern structure is believed to have been the Kondō, with a base that measured 18 meters east-to-west by 15 meters north-to-south, with some remaining foundation stones and cornerstones. The smaller structure to the east has a square base, nine meters on each side, and is believed to have been the pagoda. It addition, there was the trace of a kiln on the southwestern slope of the temple grounds, presumably for the production of roof tiles. Six types of roof tiles have been excavated from the site, which is an unusually large variety for a site which was in existence for only a short period of time. Inscriptions on tile shards indicate that the temple had some connection with the Wani clan, which was a powerful local clan which ruled this area from the Kofun period into the Nara period. No remains of any other buildings or structures have been found, and it is possible that the construction was suspended before the complete temple was finished. The temple appears to have been abandoned around the time that the Ōmi Ōtsu Palace was abandoned in 672 AD.

The temple does not appear in any historical documentation, and even the name of the temple is unknown. The site, which was backfilled after excavation, is located about a five-minute walk from the "Kinugawa" bus stop on the Kosaku Bus from Katata Station on the JR West Kosei Line.

== See also ==
- List of Historic Sites of Japan (Shiga)
