= Seta Hills Production Sites =

Group of archaeological sites

- 瀬田丘陵生産遺跡群 (Japanese)
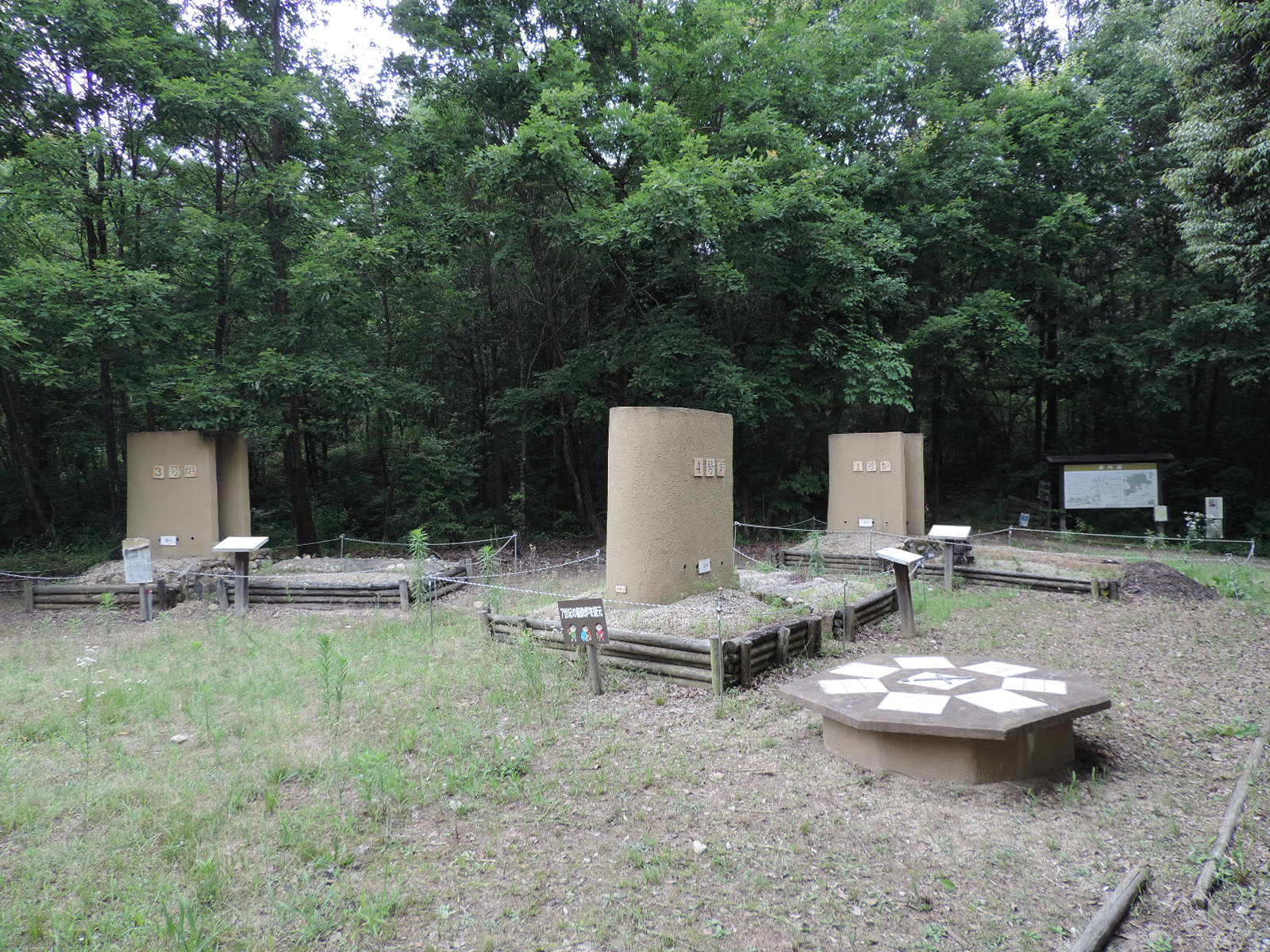
- Ruins of smelting furnaces at Gennai Pass Site

- Seta Hills Production Sites Seta Hills Production Sites (Japan)
- 34°59′41″N 135°57′05″E
- Periods: Nara period
- Location: Kusatsu, Ōtsu, Shiga, Japan
- Region: Kansai region

Site notes
- Public access: Yes (no public facilities)

The Seta Hills Production Sites (瀬田丘陵生産遺跡群, Seta kyūryō seisan iseki-gun) is a group of archaeological sites containing ancient industrial facilities located in the cities of Kusatsu and Ōtsu in the Kansai region of Japan. These site were collectively designated a National Historic Site of Japan in 1985.

== Overview ==
The Seta sites are located in the Seta Hills, which extend from the southeastern part of Lake Biwa inland to Kusatsu and the surrounding areas. The Noji Onoyama Ironworks (野路小野山製鉄遺跡) site in the Noji neighborhood of Kusatsu was first designated as a National Historic Site in 1985. It is the largest and best preserved of many iron smelting ruins which were built in the Seta Hills due to local iron ore deposits and abundant forest resources that provided charcoal for iron making in the Nara period.

In 2006, the Yamanokami site (山ノ神遺跡) with 14 pottery Anagama kilns for making Sue ware pottery, with workshops for handling clay and disposal of ashes, as well as the Gennai Pass site (源内峠遺跡; Gennai Tōge iseki) with the ruins of four refining furnaces were added to the National Historic Site designation. Products made at these various industries sites were transported down the Seta River to Lake Biwa for distribution, and were used in the subsequent construction of Fujiwara-kyo and Heian-kyo. These sites were most active during the brief period that the capital was located at the Ōmi Ōtsu Palace (667-672 AD).

These sites are located a ten-minute walk from the "Bunka Zone Mae" bus stop on the Teisan Konan Kotsu Bus from Seta Station on the JR Central Biwako Line.

== See also ==
- List of Historic Sites of Japan (Shiga)
