= Anō temple ruins =

Buddhist temple in Ōtsu, Japan

- 穴太廃寺跡 (Japanese)
- Anō temple ruins Anō temple ruins (Japan)
- 35°03′12″N 135°52′03″E
- Type: temple ruins
- Periods: Asuka period
- Location: Ōtsu, Shiga, Japan
- Region: Kansai region

Site notes
- Area: 33,028.5 m^{2} (355,516 sq ft)
- Public access: Yes (no public facilities)

The Anō temple ruins (穴太廃寺跡, Anō Haiji ato) is an archaeological site with the ruins of an Asuka period Buddhist temple located between the Anō and Karasaki neighborhoods of the city of Ōtsu, Shiga Prefecture, in the Kansai region of Japan. The site was designated as a National Historic Site of Japan in 1997.

== Overview ==
The Anō temple site has been known for a long time due to numerous roof tiles which have been found in the vicinity, but was identified as the ruins of Buddhist temple complex only in 1973, and was excavated in 1984. The site has two overlapping occupation layers. The earliest layer appears to have been patterned after Kawara-dera in Asuka, with a Kondō in the west and a pagoda in the east, surrounded by a cloister, aligned slightly to the northeast. The second layer appears to have been patterned after Hokki-ji in Ikaruga, Nara, with a Kondō in the west, Pagoda in the east, and a large Lecture Hall in the north. The alignment of this later temple is on a north-south axis. Fragments of a silver Buddha image have been recovered from the site of the Lecture Hall. Inscriptions on excavated roof tiles give the dates of either 630 and 632 or 690 and 692 AD. This was either shortly before or after the construction of the Ōmi Ōtsu Palace, which was used from 667 to 672 AD. The temple is believed to have existed into the Heian period, although no details are mentioned in historical documentation, and even the name of the temple is unknown.

The site, which was backfilled after excavation, is located about a five-minute walk from Anō Station on the Keihan Electric Railway Ishiyama Sakamoto Line.

== See also ==
- List of Historic Sites of Japan (Shiga)
