= Kōjinyama Kofun =

Kofun period burial mound in Hikone, Japan

- 荒神山古墳 (Japanese)
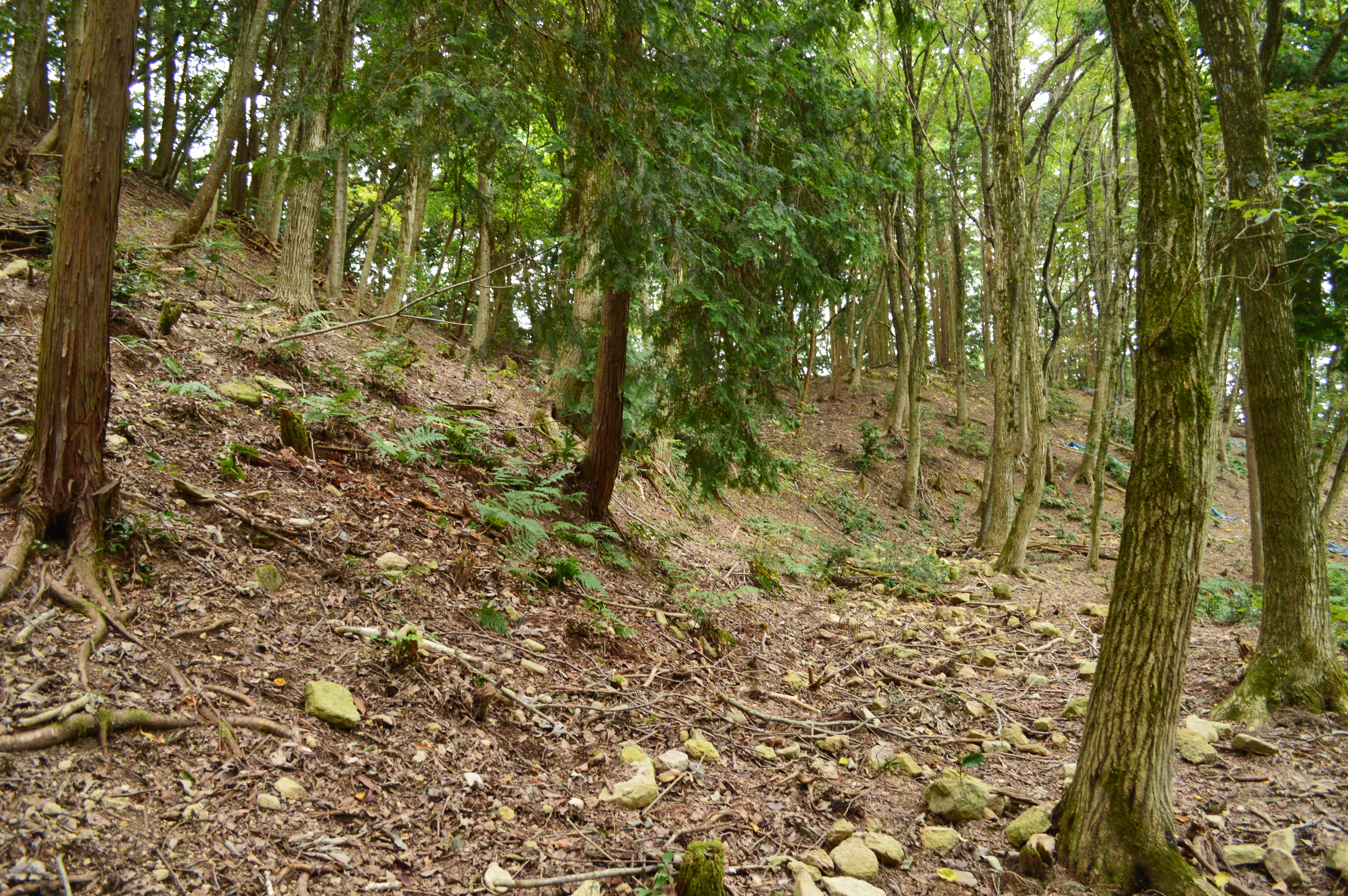
- Kōjinyama Kofun

- Kōjinyama Kofun Kōjinyama Kofun (Japan)
- 35°14′6.91″N 136°11′52.35″E
- Type: Kofun
- Periods: Kofun period
- Location: Hikone, Shiga, Japan
- Region: Kansai region

History
- Built: 4th century AD

Site notes
- Area: 13,150 m^{2} (141,500 sq ft)
- Public access: Yes (no public facilities)

The Kōjinyama Kofun (荒神山古墳) is a Kofun period burial mound located between the Hinatsu and Kiyosaki neighborhoods of the city of Hikone Shiga Prefecture in the Kansai region of Japan. The tumulus was designated a National Historic Site of Japan in 2011.

== Overview ==
The Kōjinyama Kofun is located on the top of a ridge that descends from the summit of 284-meter Mount Kōjin, on the eastern shore of Lake Biwa. It is a zenpō-kōen-fun (前方後円墳), which is shaped like a keyhole, having one square end and one circular end, when viewed from above. The surrounding area was once part of shōen controlled by Tōdai-ji in Nara and was also the location of the Muromachi period Kōjinyama Castle. The mountain also contains more than ten other known kofun burial mounds, forming the "Kōjinyama Kofun cluster".

The tumulus has a total length of 124 meters and is thus the second largest in Shiga Prefecture. The exterior of the tumulus was surveyed from 2002 to 2007. It was discovered that the mound had been constructed in three tiers, and that it had originally covered in fukiishi. Numerous shards of haniwa were recovered from the vicinity. These include cylindrical, "morning glory-shaped", and figurative (shaped like houses, animals or people) haniwa. The interior has never been excavated, so the details of the burial chamber are unknown, but the tumulus is believed to date from the early Kofun period (end of the 4th century AD) from the shape of the mound and type of haniwa. As the posterior circular portion has an indentation and slabs of stone are scattered around the site, it is assumed that the tumulus had a pit-type burial chamber which was looted in antiquity. The excavated haniwa are collectively designated as a Tangible Cultural Property by Hikone City. They are kept at the Kaikoku Memorial Hall (開国記念館, Kaikoku Kinenkan) in Hikone city.

The tumulus is located about ten minutes by car from Kawase Station on the JR Biwako Line.

The Inabe site (稲部遺跡, Inabe iseki), which is about three kilometers south of the Kōjinyama Kofun, contains the ruins of a very large building with a floor area of 188 square meters, was contemporary to the tumulus, and it is speculated that there is some connection between these sites. Also, the temple of Enjuzen-ji (延寿禅寺) at the foot of Mount Kōjin has a large stone wheel made of green tuff. While its provenance is uncertain, similar stone wheels are known to have been used to seal the burial chambers in kofun tumuli, and both the composition of the stone and its workmanship coincide with the stone fragments of the burial chamber found near the tumulus.

Overall length
124 meters
Posterior circular portion
80 meter diameter x 16 meter high x 3 tiers
"Neck" portion
52 meters wide x 9 meters high
Anterior rectangular portion
61 meters wide x 53 meters long x 10 meters high x 3 tiers

== See also ==
- List of Historic Sites of Japan (Shiga)
