= Kyōgoku fortified residence ruin =

Kyōgoku clan fortified residence ruins
- 京極氏遺跡
- Maibara, Shiga Prefecture, Japan

Site information
- Type: flatland-style Japanese castle
- Condition: ruins

Location
- Kyōgoku clan fortified residence ruins Kyōgoku clan fortified residence ruins (Japan)
- Coordinates: 35°23′40″N 136°24′39″E

Site history
- Built: Sengoku period
- In use: Sengoku period
- Demolished: c.1572

The Kyōgoku fortified residence ruin (京極氏遺跡, Kyōgoku iseki) the name of a Japanese National Historic Site locatejd in the city of Maibara in northern Shiga Prefecture in the Kansai region of Japan. The site consists of the Kyōgoku clan residence ruins (京極氏城館跡, Kyōgoku-shi jōkan ato) and the Yataka-ji temple ruins (弥高寺跡, Yataka-ji ato).

== Overview ==
The Kyōgoku clan was a powerful samurai clan which dominated northern Ōmi Province during the muromachi and early Sengoku period. Sasaki Nobutsuna played a prominent role in the Jōkyū War and was awarded with vast estates in his native Ōmi by the Kamakura shogunate. This fourth son, Ujinobu, inherited the six districts of Echi, Inukami, Sakata, Ika, Azai and Takashima and the position of shugo and established a cadet branch of the clan, taking his name from the location of his residence in the Kyōgoku neighborhood of Kyoto. Throughout the remainder of the Kamakura period and the Muromachi period, the prestigious post of shugo was monopolized by the Rokkaku clan, a rival cadet branch of the Sasaki clan which dominated southern Ōmi Province; however, the Kyōgoku remained rulers of northern Ōmi for our two centuries until, when weekend by internal rebellions, the clan was defeated by the Azai clan of Echizen Province.

The Kyōgoku had their main residence in the Kiyotaki neighborhood of what is now the eastern edge of the city of Maibara. Known as the Kashiwahara-kan (柏原館), this residence was near the surviving clan bodaiji of Tokugen-in. In 1505, Kyōgoku Takakiyo relocated to the most easily defendable slopes of Mount Ibuki and built the Jōheiji-no-yakata (上平寺館; ]) fortified residence.

== Jōheiji-no-yakata ==
The Jōheiji-no-yakata presumably takes its name from a pre-existing Buddhist temple, of which no trace has yet been found. The site was with a 250 meter north-to-south by 170 meter east-to-west enclosure, surrounded by moats and earthen ramparts, and divided by an inner moat. The mansion itself occupied a 35 by 54 meter inner enclosure, with two large and two smaller buildings forming a U-shaped courtyard, which contained a garden with pond and monumental stones. Archaeological excavations have found a large number of porcelain shards, including banqueting cups, and celedon and white porcelain which had been imported from China. The mansion was surrounded by the residences of senior vassals and clan officials. To the south, on the outside of they inner moat were two large buildings, one for samurai involved in the administration of the Kyōgoku territories, and the other to administer commerce and industries under the direct control of the Kyōgoku clan. Further south was the jōkamachi itself, as well as districts for the residence of lower-ranked samurai. Archaeological excavations have detected the cornerstones of buildings, stone ditches, stone walls, earthworks, and gravel trails.

Further up the slopes of Mount Ibuki was the site of Jōheiji Castle (上平寺城). This was not used in peacetime, but was a final redoubt in case of conflict. Little is known of the original configuration of the castle, as in 1523, following a local uprising against the Kyōgoku, the forces of Azai Sukemasa invaded northern Ōmi and overwhelmed the clan. The castle was extensively remodeled around 1570 by the Azai with the assistance of the Asakura clan, and consisted of a main enclosure at an elevation of 669 meters, connected directly to a second and third enclosure, protected by vertical dry moats, earthworks, and a network of ridge-shaped pits is dug to block the movement of the enemy. The Azai and Asakura clans were destroyed by the forces of Oda Nobunaga shortly afterwards, and Jōheiji Castle was surrendered to Nobunaga's forces without a battle and was thereafter abandoned.

== Tatakaji ==
Yataka-ji (弥高寺) was a Buddhist temple on the southern slopes of Mount Ibuki. As seen from the site of Jōheiji Castle, the temple was located to the west, across a valley. Mount Ibuki (1377 meters) has been regarded as a sacred mountain and a place of worship for the Shugendō practitioners since ancient times. The temple of Gokoku-ji, the predecessor to Yakata-ji was founded in 878 AD, and was one of the four temples on the mountain which were collectively called the "Ibukiyama Temple". By 1496, the temple had been extensively fortified and was used as a stronghold by the Kyōgoku clan and continued in this role even after the building of the Jōheiji-no-yakata and associated castle. The fortified area measured 300 meters from north-to-south and 250 meters from east-to-west, with a flat central enclosure which housed the main temple buildings. Although excavations have found some foundation stones from what is assumed to be the site of the Main Hall, the remains are not well preserved and the layout of the structures is uncertain. Excavation has unearthed various Buddhist relics, such as incense burners, fragments of Buddhist statuary and numerous earthenware shards. The main gate to the temple was a box-gate, similar to that used on a Japanese castle and a network of ridge-shaped pits, similar to that which was found at Jōheiji Castle was also dug into the slopes around the gate to hinder the advance of any enemies. These were most likely later additions by the Azai and Asakura, who remodeled the fortifications at this temple at the same time as Jōheiji Castle. The temple survived the fall of the Azai clan in 1573, but was relocated to the foot of the mountain in 1580 and the original fortified site fell into ruin.

The ruins are about a 12-minute drive from Ōmi-Nagaoka Station on the JR West Biwako Line.

== See also ==
- List of Historic Sites of Japan (Shiga)
