= Dōnoue Site =

Archaeological site in Ōtsu, Japan

Dōnoue ruins
- 堂ノ上遺跡 (Japanese)
- Dōnoue ruins Dōnoue Site (Japan)
- 34°58′19″N 135°54′41″E
- Periods: Nara – Heian period
- Location: Ōtsu, Shiga, Japan
- Region: Kansai region

History
- Built: 7th–10th century AD

Site notes
- Elevation: 27 m (89 ft)
- Public access: No

The Dōnoue Site (堂ノ上遺跡, Dōnoue iseki) is an archaeological site with the ruins of a Nara to Heian period government administrative complex located in what is now the Jinryo neighborhood of the city of Ōtsu in Shiga Prefecture in the Kansai region of Japan. The site has been protected as a National Historic Site from 1978, with the area under protection expanded in 2002.

== Overview ==
In the late Nara period, after the establishment of a centralized government under the Ritsuryō system, local rule over the provinces was standardized under a kokufu (provincial capital), and each province was divided into smaller administrative districts, known as (郡, gun, kōri), composed of 2–20 townships in 715 AD. Each of the units had an administrative complex, or kanga (官衙遺跡) built on a semi-standardized layout based on contemporary Chinese design.

The Dōnoue ruins are located along the ancient route of the Tōsandō highway. It is located on a small plateau east of the Seta Bridge on the Seta River (which flows out of Lake Biwa), and southwest of the Ōmi Kokufu ruins. As the result of several archaeological excavations, it was found that the ruins follow roughly the standardized kanga format, with a large rectangular enclosure surrounded by an earthen rampart and wooden palisade, with a base width of 3.5 meters, and a moat ranging in width from 11,5 meters in the north and south to 26.1 meters in the east and west. Within, there were several buildings built with foundation stones, with a large main hall, smaller rear hall and east and west side halls, forming a U-shaped courtyard. The building used the same roof tiles as the Ōmi Kokufu.

Although the ruins are very close to the Ōmi Kokufu, it is believed from the type and layout of the buildings, as well as the dates, that this is the ruin of some unknown county-level administrative complex for Ōmi Province. The facility was built in the middle of the 8th century in the Nara period, and was abolished in the early Heian period (late 9th century to early 10th century). It is also believed to be the location of a post station called the Seta-no-umaya (勢多駅) mentioned in the Engishiki records.

The site was backfilled after excavation and is now an empty field. It is about a five-minute walk from Karahashimae Station on the Keihan Electric Railway Ishiyama Sakamoto Line.

== See also ==
- List of Historic Sites of Japan (Shiga)
