= List of cultural properties of Japan – historical materials (Shiga) =

This list is of the cultural properties of Japan designated in the category of historical materials (歴史資料, rekishi shiryō) for the Prefecture of Shiga.

== National Cultural Properties ==
As of 1 August 2015, five Important Cultural Properties have been designated, being of national significance.

Property	Date	Municipality	Ownership	Comments	Image	Coordinates	Ref.
Materials relating to Amenomori Hōshū 雨森芳洲関係資料; Amenomori Hōshū kankei shiryō	Edo period	Nagahama	Takatsuki Kannon No Sato Museum of History and Folklore (高月町立観音の里歴史民俗資料館)	123 items		35°28′31″N 136°14′26″E	
Onjō-ji Shaku 園城寺尺; Onjōji shaku	Muromachi period	Ōtsu	Onjō-ji	two items		35°00′48″N 135°51′10″E	
Katsura-gawa Myōō-in Confinement Ofuda 葛川明王院参籠札; Katsura-gawa Myōō-in sanrō fuda	Kamakura to Edo period	Ōtsu	Myōō-in (明王院)	501 items		35°14′52″N 135°52′09″E	
Shūzon edition woodblock characters 宗存版木活字（付属品共） Shūzon-ban mokkatsuji (fuzoku hintomo)	Edo period	Ōtsu	Enryaku-ji	174,261 items		35°04′13″N 135°50′28″E	
Kemari-related materials of the Nanba Family 難波家蹴鞠関係資料; Nanba-ke kemari kankei shiryō	Heian to Edo period	Ōtsu	Hirano Jinja (平野神社)	491 items		35°00′12″N 135°52′26″E	

== Prefectural Cultural Properties ==
As of 1 January 2004, five properties have been designated at a prefectural level.

Property	Date	Municipality	Ownership	Comments	Image	Coordinates	Ref.
Saigoku 33 Temple Pilgrimage Ofuda 西国三十三所順礼札; Saigoku sanjūsan-sho junrei satsu	Muromachi to Edo period	Ōtsu	Ishiyama-dera	nine items		34°57′37″N 135°54′21″E	
Kinshō-ji Notice Boards 金勝寺制札; Kinshōji seisatsu	1487 and 1491	Rittō	Kinshō-ji (金勝寺) (kept at the Rittō Museum of History and Folklore (栗東歴史民俗博物館))	two items		35°01′05″N 136°00′32″E	
Chōju-ji Notice Boards 長寿寺制札; Chōjuji seisatsu	1333 and 1491	Konan	Chōju-ji (長寿寺)	two items		34°59′07″N 136°03′36″E	
Lotus Sutra woodblocks (Saimyō-ji edition) 法華経板木 (西明寺版); Hokke-kyō hangi (Saimyōji-ban)	Nanboku-chō and Muromachi period	Kōra	Saimyō-ji (西明寺)	forty-eight woodblocks, with inscriptions of 1386 and 1413		35°11′00″N 136°17′08″E	
Humane King Sutra woodblocks (Saimyō-ji edition) 仁王経板木 (西明寺版); Ninnō-kyō hangi (Saimyōji-ban)	1388	Kōra	Saimyō-ji (西明寺)	ten woodblocks		35°11′00″N 136°17′08″E	

== See also ==
- Cultural Properties of Japan
- List of Historic Sites of Japan (Shiga)
- Ōmi Province
- List of National Treasures of Japan (historical materials)
