= Ōjiyama Kofun =

Burial mound in Japan

- 皇子山古墳 (Japanese)
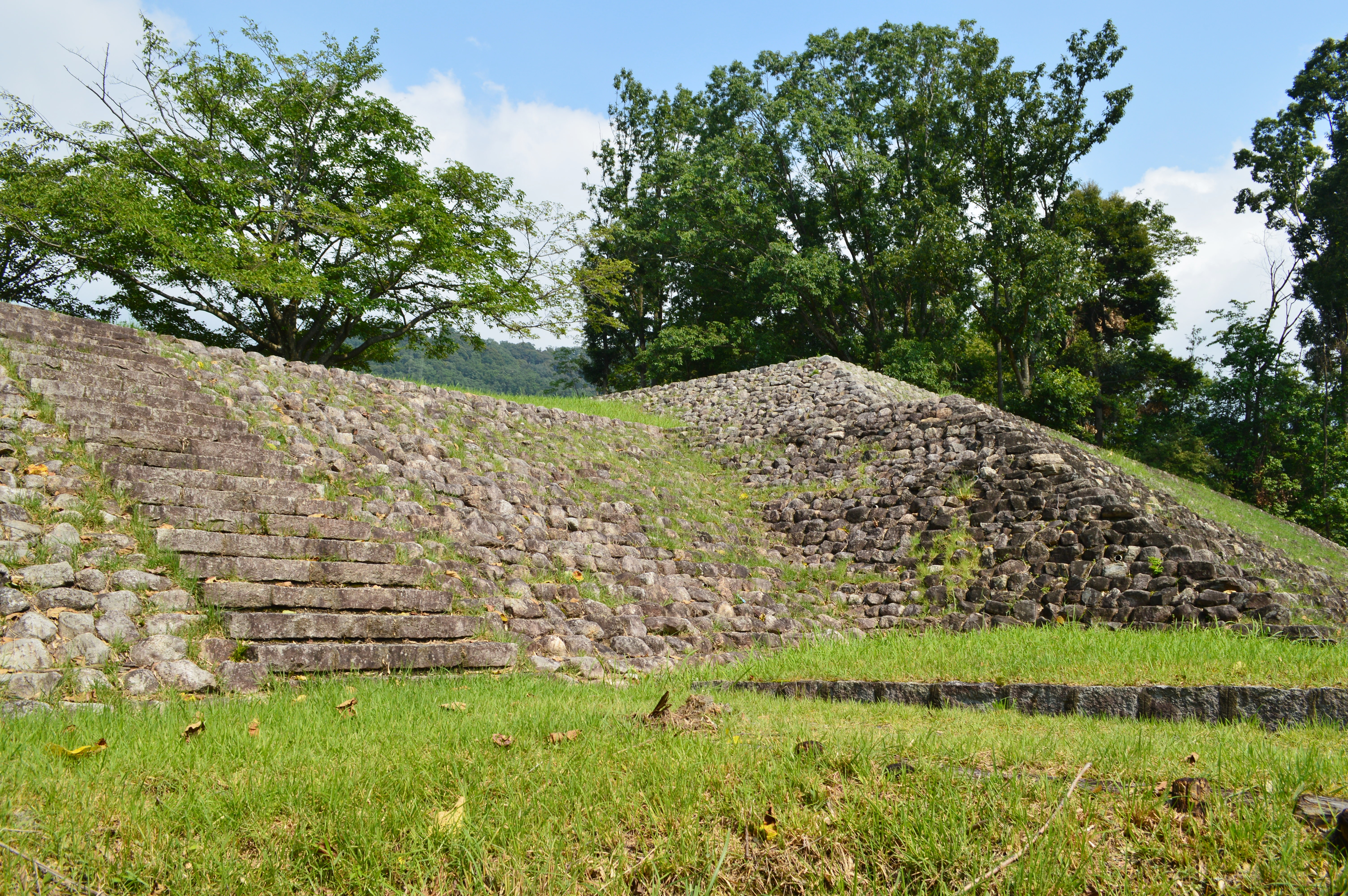
- Ōjiyama Kofun

- Ōjiyama Kofun Ōjiyama Kofun (Japan)
- 35°14′6.91″N 136°11′52.35″E
- Type: Kofun
- Periods: Kofun period
- Location: Ōtsu, Shiga, Japan
- Region: Kansai region

History
- Built: 4th century AD

Site notes
- Public access: Yes (park)

The Ōjiyama Kofun (皇子山古墳) is a Kofun period burial mound located in the Nishikori neighborhood of the city of Ōtsu Shiga Prefecture in the Kansai region of Japan. The tumulus was designated a National Historic Site of Japan in 1974.

== Overview ==
The Ōjiyama Kofun is located in the southern part of the west bank of Lake Biwa, west of Keihan Electric Railway Ōmijingūmae Station, at an elevation of 164 meters. It is a "two conjoined rectangles" type tumulus (zenpō-kōhō-fun (前方後方墳)), orientated to the south. it is covered in fukiishi only on the side facing Lake Biwa, and there is evidence that it was designed to be visible from the lake. The tumulus was excavated in 1964 and 1970, at which time four burial facilities were found in the anterior portion and one in the posterior portion; however, a detailed investigation was not made of the burial chambers and grave good were not recovered.

Estimated to have been constructed in the late 4th century, it is the oldest tumulus to have been found in the Ōmi region. It is not known who built this tumulus, but it is believed to have some connection with the powerful Wani clan, which is known to have ruled this area of Ōmi during the Kofun period. The location of the tumulus near the site of the late Asuka period Ōmi Palace may also have some significance.

From 1981 to 1985, the tumulus was restored, and is now part of an archaeological park open to the public. It is located about ten minutes on foot from Ōmijingūmae Station on the Keihan Electric Railway Ishiyama Sakamoto Line.

The National Historic Site designation includes a circular burial mound (empun (円墳)) with a diameter of about 20 meters, which is slightly east of the main tumulus. The mound was once surrounded by a moat. It is estimated to date from around the end of the 3rd century AD, or earlier than the main tumulus.

Overall length
60 meters
Posterior portion
35 meters wide
Anterior portion
25 meters wide

== See also ==
- List of Historic Sites of Japan (Shiga)
