= Oiso Shrine =

Oiso Shrine 奥石神社
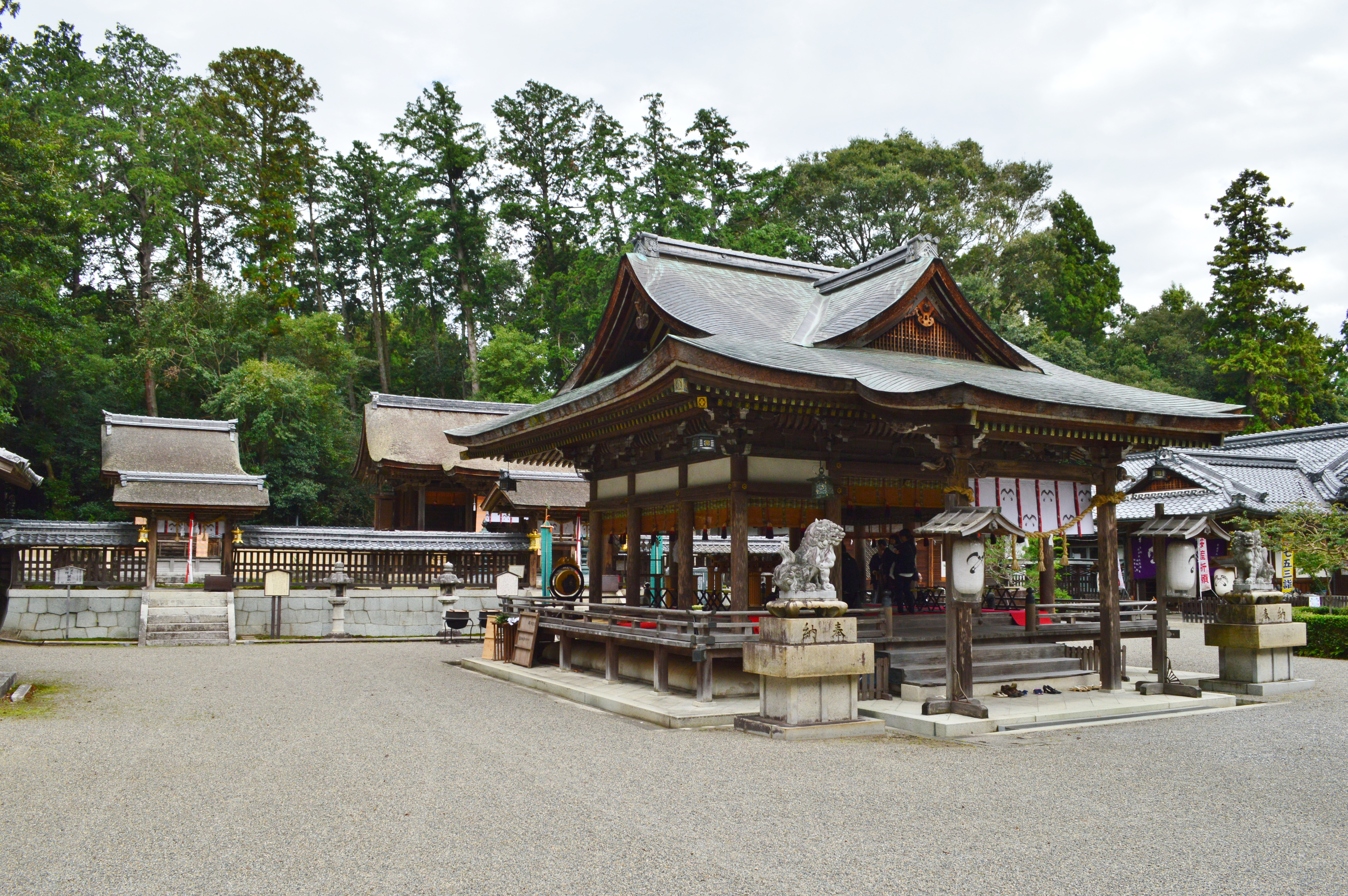
- Oiso Shrine

- Oiso Shrine Oiso Shrine (Japan)

Religion
- Affiliation: Shinto
- Deity: Ame-no-Koyane

Location
- Location: Ōmihachiman-shi, Shiga-ken
- Interactive map of Oiso Shrine 奥石神社
- Coordinates: 35°07′50″N 136°09′41″E

Architecture
- Established: pre-Nara period

Oiso Shrine (奥石神社, Oiso Jinja) is a Shinto shrine located in the Azuchi neighborhood of the city of Ōmihachiman, Shiga Prefecture, Japan. It located on the old Nakasendō highway connecting Kyoto with the eastern provinces of Japan, and part of the precincts are a National Historic Site. The main kami enshrined is Ame-no-Koyane, who at this shrine is worshipped as the kami of then kitchen and protection against fire, and for easy childbirth.

== History ==
The original construction of this shrine is unknown, but it pre-dates the Nara period and may have been part of a cult entered on the worship of Mount Kinugasa, the 432.7-meter mountain located behind the shrine. The shrine's own history (dated from 1384) alleges that it was founded in the first year of the reign of the semi-legendary Emperor Kōrei. His son, Prince Kibitsuhiko, had a palace at this site, and that during the reign of Emperor Ōjin, the famed general Yamato Takeru constructed a shrine to his dead wife, Ototachibana-hime.

The shrine only appears in historical documentation from 806 AD in a brief listing of the shrines of Ōmi Province. In 851 AD, it was accorded the equivalent of 6th court rank. The shrine is listed in the 927 AD Engishiki records. Little is known of its history. It was rebuilt in 1581 and was known as the Kamadai Myōjin (鎌大明神). After the Meiji restoration in 1876, it was ranked as a village shrine in the Modern system of ranked Shinto shrines of State Shinto, and was promoted to county shrine in 1881 and prefectural shrine in 1924.

The Honden of the shrine dates from the 1581 rebuilding and is a National Important Cultural Property. It is a three-bay Nagare-zukuri style structure with a cypress-bark roof and arabesque pattern carvings. It is contemporary with Oda Nobunaga's Azuchi Castle and jōkamachi.

== Oiso-no-mori ==
The forest around the shrine is called the Oiso-no-mori (老蘇森). According to the shrine's legend, the land around the shrine was uninhabitable wasteland, with marshes and springs. A man named Ishibe planted tree saplings in the area and after praying to the kami, it became a forest and Ishibe lived to a legendary old age of over a hundred years. The name "Oiso-no-mori" was used extensively in the Heian period as a pillow word in poetry, appearing (for example) in the Songs to Make the Dust Dance on the Beams anthology of 1180 AD. The location of the forest on the Tōkaidō and Nakasendō made it a tourist attraction, and it appears in travel guides even from the Kamakura period. The forest currently consists of Cryptomeria, Hinoki Cypress and Japanese red pine. It was made a National Historic Site in 1949.

The shrine is about 15 minutes by car from Azuchi Station on the JR Central Biwako Line.

== Gallery ==
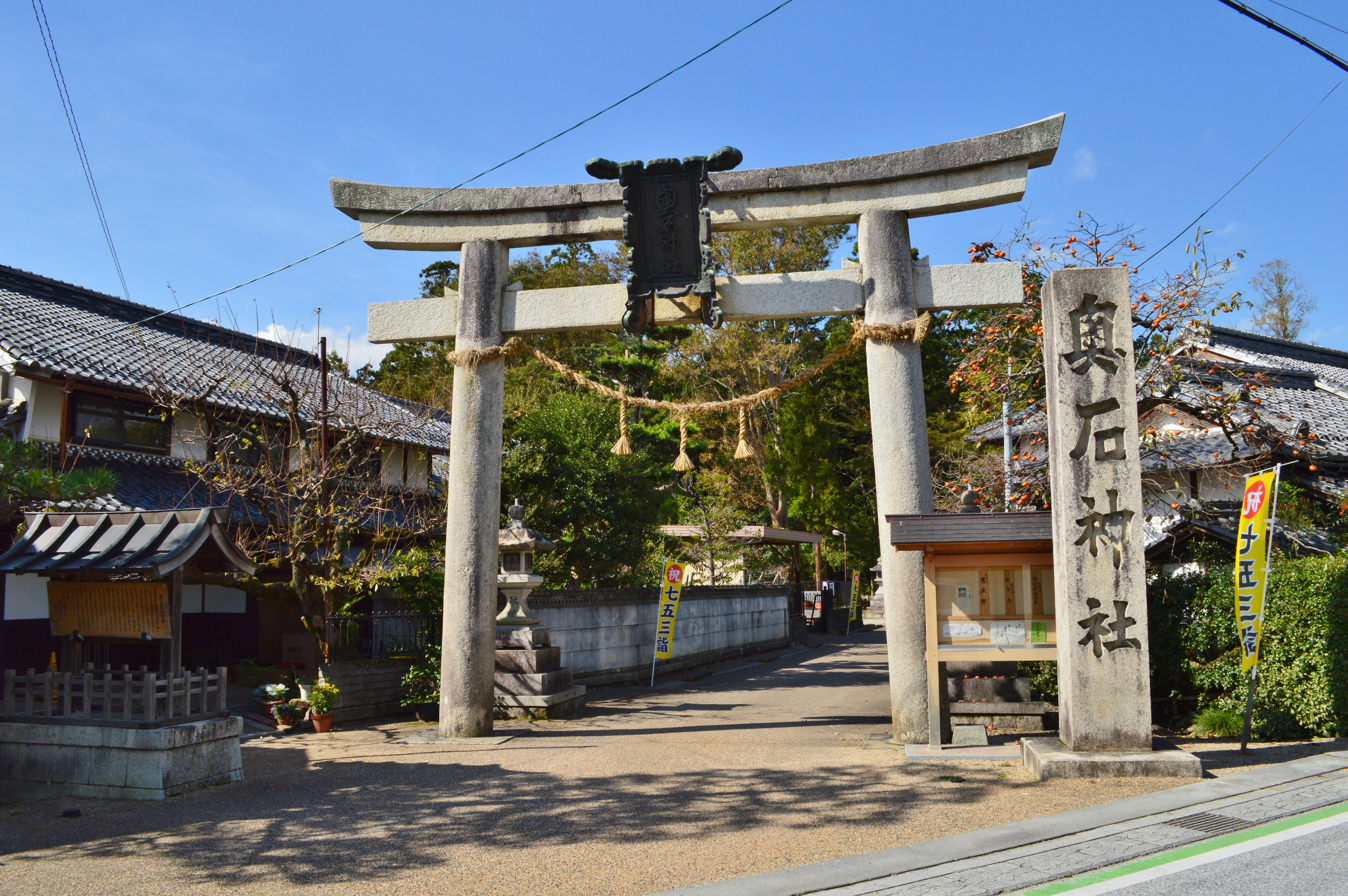
Torii

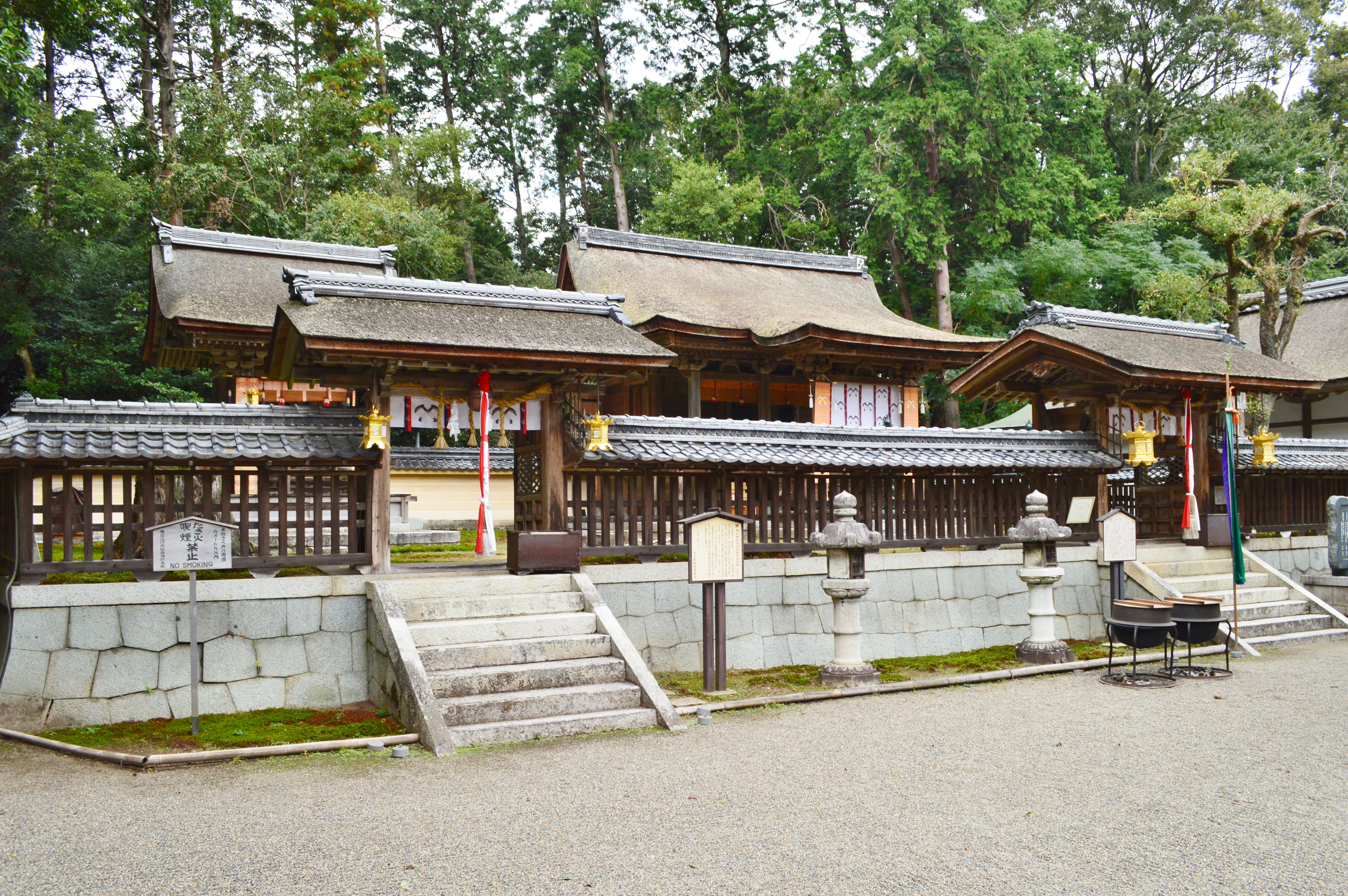
Honden (ICP)

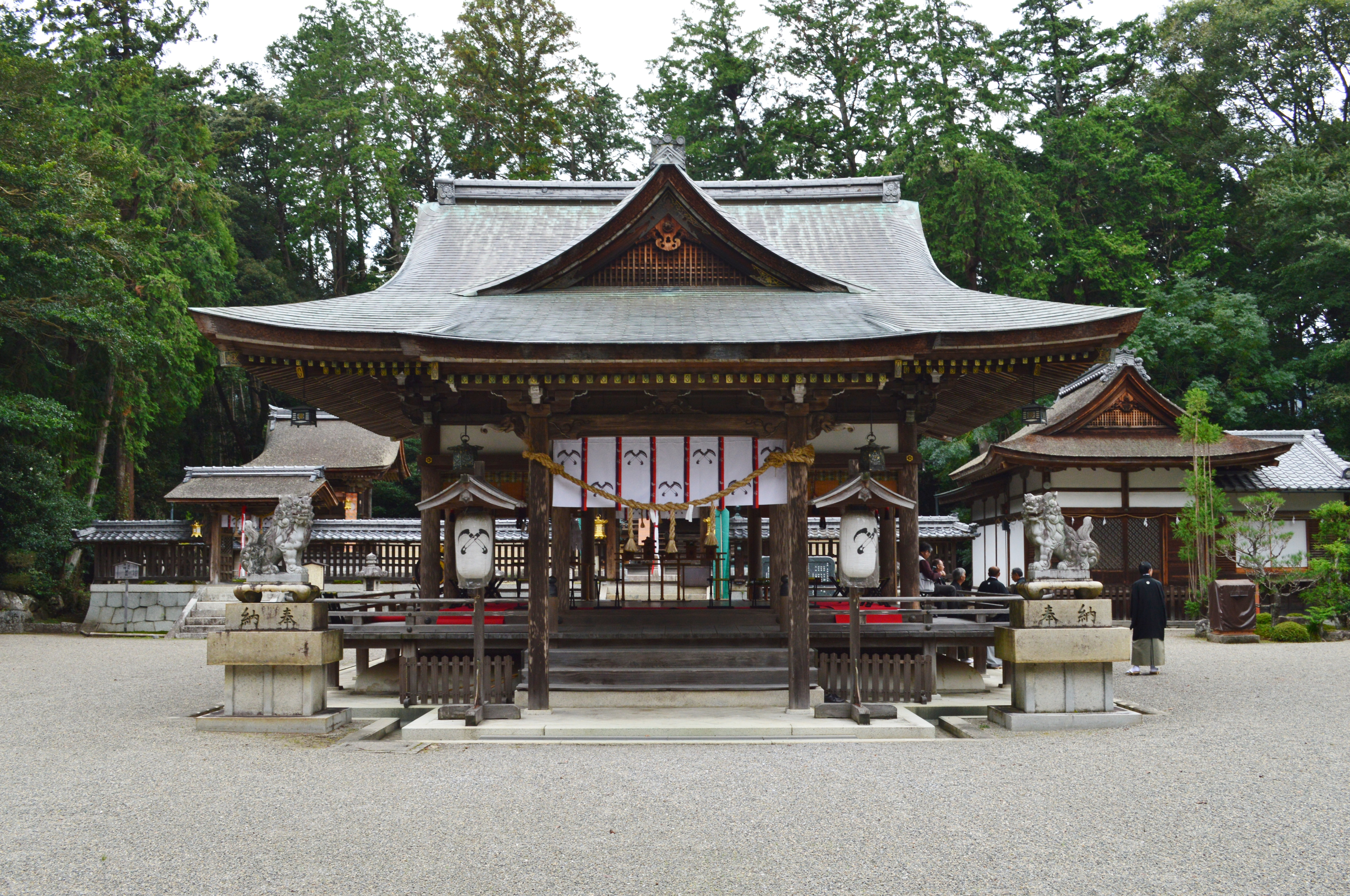
Haiden

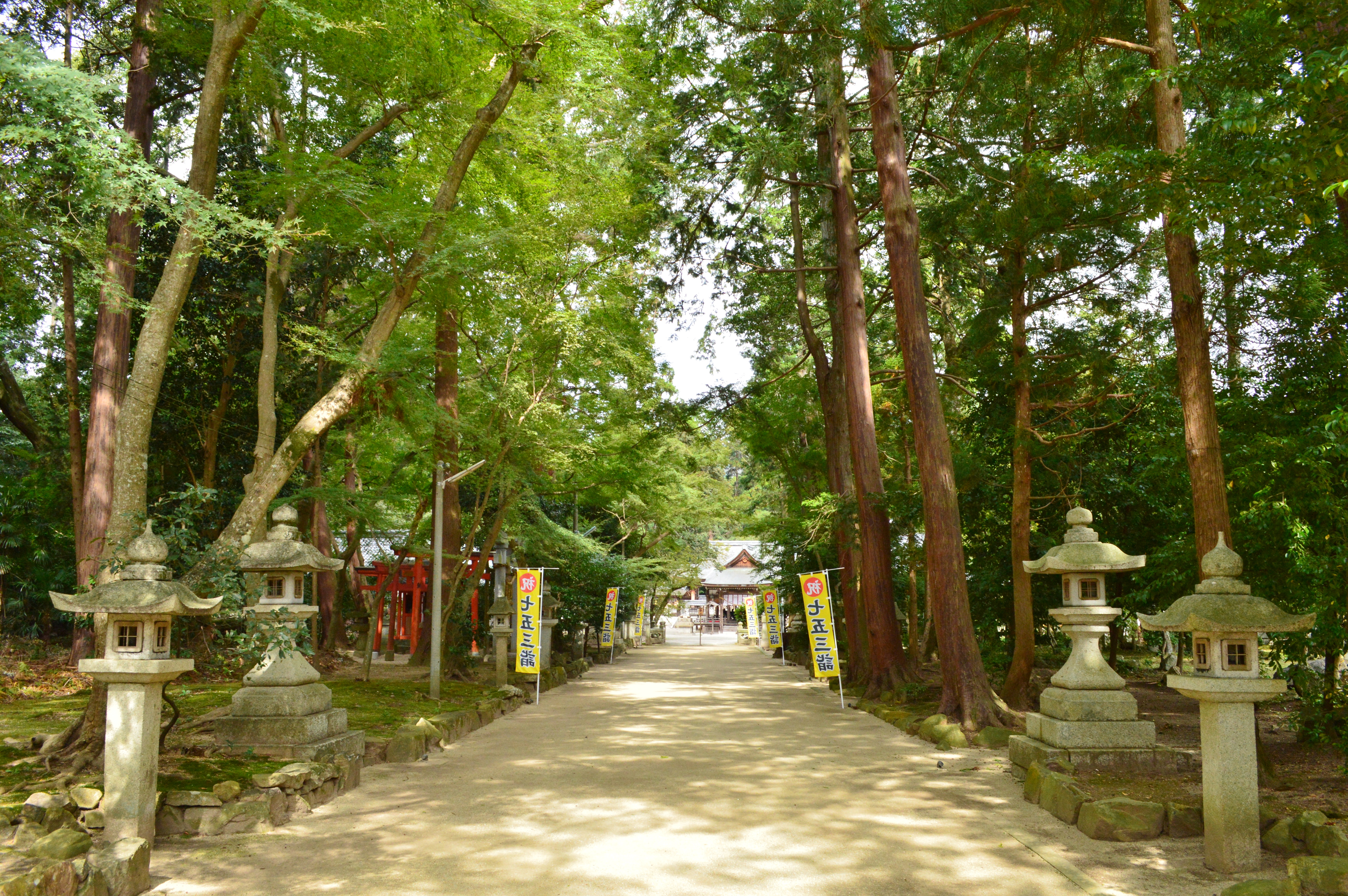
Oiso-no-mori

== See also ==
- List of Historic Sites of Japan (Shiga)
- List of Shinto shrines
