= List of historic sites of Japan (Shiga) =

This list is of the historic sites of Japan located within the Prefecture of Shiga.

== National Historic Sites ==
As of 1 August 2025, fifty-one Sites have been designated as being of national significance (including two *Special Historic Sites); Genbao Castle Site spans the prefectural borders with Fukui.

Site	Municipality	Comments	Image	Coordinates	Type	Ref.
*Azuchi Castle ruins 安土城跡 Azuchi-jō ato	Ōmihachiman, Higashiōmi	Sengoku period castle ruins	Azuchi Castle ruins	35°09′23″N 136°08′22″E	2	1562
*Hikone Castle Site 彦根城跡 Hikone-jō ato	Hikone	Edo period castle; submitted for inscription on the UNESCO World Heritage List	Hikone Castle Site	35°16′34″N 136°15′07″E	2	1591
Ashiura Kannon-ji ruins 芦浦観音寺跡 Ashiura Kannonji ato	Kusatsu	Sengoku period fortified temple	Ashiura Kannonji ruins	35°03′35″N 135°57′17″E	2, 3	3403
Ise Site 伊勢遺跡 Ise iseki	Moriyama	Yayoi period settlement trace	Ise Site	35°03′56″N 135°59′26″E	1	00003748
Kinugawa temple ruins 衣川廃寺跡 Kinugawa Haiji ato	Ōtsu	Asuka period temple ruins		35°06′36″N 135°54′23″E	3	1603
Enman-in Gardens 円満院庭園 Enman-in teien	Ōtsu	Edo period garden; also a Place of Scenic Beauty	Enman-in Gardens	35°00′50″N 135°51′12″E	8	1568
Shimonogō Site 下之郷遺跡 Shimonogō iseki	Moriyama	Yayoi period settlement trace		35°03′59″N 135°59′23″E	1	3323
Kamaha Castle ruins 鎌刃城跡 Kamaha-jō ato	Maibara	Sengoku period castle ruins	Kamaha Castle Site	35°17′49″N 136°18′50″E	2	3417
Kannonji Castle ruins 観音寺城跡 Kannonji-jō ato	Ōmihachiman, Higashiōmi	Sengoku period castle ruins	Kannonji Castle ruins	35°08′45″N 136°09′27″E	2	1607
Gichū-ji Precincts 義仲寺境内 Gichūji keidai	Ōtsu	temple with grave of Kiso Yoshinaka	Gichūji Precincts	35°00′11″N 135°52′48″E	3	1596
Former Wachūsan Honpo 旧和中散本舗 kyū-Wachūsan honpo	Rittō	Edo period pharmacy	Former Wachūsan Honpo	35°01′29″N 136°01′07″E	6	1588
Kyōgoku clan fortified residence ruins - Yataka-ji ruins 京極氏遺跡 京極氏城館跡 弥高寺跡 Kyōgoku-shi iseki Kyōgoku-shi jōkan ato Yatakaji ato	Maibara	Sengoku period fortified residence		35°23′40″N 136°24′39″E	2	3431
Ōmi Kokuchō ruins 近江国府跡 Ōmi Kokuchō ato	Ōtsu	Nara/Heian period provincial capital ruins, includes Sōyama Site (惣山遺跡), Aoei Site (青江遺跡), and Chūroi Site (中路遺跡)	Ōmi Kokuchō ruins	34°58′16″N 135°55′11″E	2	1597
Ōmi Ōtsu Palace Nishigori Site 近江大津宮錦織遺跡 Ōmi Ōtsu Palace Nishigori iseki	Ōtsu	Asuka period palace ruins	Ōmi Ōtsu Palace Nishigori Site	35°01′42″N 135°51′18″E	2	1605
Anō temple ruins 穴太廃寺跡 Anō Haiji ato	Ōtsu	Asuka period Buddhist temple ruins		35°03′12″N 135°52′03″E	3	1611
Kohori Kofun Cluster 古保利古墳群 Kohori kofun-gun	Nagahama	Kofun period tumuli cluster		35°27′36″N 136°12′02″E	1	3377
Kōjō-in Gardens 光浄院庭園 Kōjō-in teien	Ōtsu	Edo period garden; also a Place of Scenic Beauty		35°00′50″N 135°51′09″E	8	1569
Kōka District Chūsō ruins 甲賀郡中惣遺跡群 Kōka-gun Chūsō iseki-gun	Kōka	Muromachi period fortification of the Kōka ikki		34°53′14″N 136°14′59″E	2	00003602
Ōjiyama Kofun 皇子山古墳 Ōjiyama kofun	Ōtsu	Kofun period tumulus	Ōjiyama Kofun	35°01′44″N 135°51′03″E	1	1601
Kōjinyama Kofun 荒神山古墳 Kōjinyama kofun	Hikone	Kofun period tumulus	Kōjinyama Kofun	35°14′06″N 136°11′53″E	1	00003703
Komasaka Stone Buddhas 狛坂磨崖仏 Komasaka magaibutsu	Rittō	Nara period carvings	Komasaka Stone Buddhas	34°57′32″N 136°00′39″E	3	1586
Shigaraki Palace Site 紫香楽宮跡 Shigaraki-no-miya ato	Kōka	Asuka period palace ruins	Shigaraki Palace Site	34°55′07″N 136°04′57″E	2	1560
Kasugayama Kofun Cluster 春日山古墳群 Kasugayama kofun-gun	Ōtsu	Kofun period tumuli cluster		35°07′15″N 135°54′27″E	1	1602
Odani Castle ruins 小谷城跡 Odani-jō ato	Nagahama	Sengoku period castle ruins	Odani Castle ruins	35°27′33″N 136°16′36″E	2	1577
Tarumi Saiō Tongū Site 垂水斎王頓宮跡 Tarumi Saiō tongū ato	Kōka	Heian period palace location	Tarumi Saiō Tongū Site	34°56′21″N 136°15′54″E	2	1585
Sūfuku-ji ruins 崇福寺跡 Sūfukuji ato	Ōtsu	Asuka/Muromachi period temple ruins	Sūfukuji ruins	35°02′39″N 135°50′50″E	3	1578
Seta Hills Production Sites 瀬田丘陵生産遺跡群 Seta kyūryō seisan iseki-gun	Kusatsu, Ōtsu	Asuka/Nara period smelter and kilns	Seta Hills Production Sites	34°59′41″N 135°57′05″E	6	1608
Shimizuyama Castle ruins 清水山城館跡 Shimizu-yama jōkan ato	Takashima	Muromachi period fortification ruins		35°21′37″N 136°01′10″E	2	3432
Kyōgoku clan cemetery 清滝寺京極家墓所 Kyotakidera Kyōgoku-ke bosho	Maibara	Edo period Daimyō cemetery	Kyōgoku clan cemetery	35°20′43″N 136°23′15″E	7	1567
Yukinoyama Kofun 雪野山古墳 Yukinoyama kofun	Ōmihachiman, Higashiōmi, Ryūō	Kofun period tumulus	Yukinoyama Kofun	35°07′42″N 136°05′53″E	1	00003839
Zenpō-in Gardens 善法院庭園 Zenpō-in teien	Ōtsu	Edo period garden; also a Place of Scenic Beauty		35°00′48″N 135°51′00″E	8	1570
Kusatsu-juku Honjin 草津宿本陣 Kusatsu-juku honjin	Kusatsu	Edo period honjin	Kusatsu-juku Honjin	35°01′05″N 135°57′36″E	6	1589
Ōiwayama Kofun Cluster 大岩山古墳群 Ōiwayama kofun-gun	Yasu	Kofun period tumuli cluster	Ōiwayama Kofun Cluster	35°04′38″N 136°02′31″E	1	1579
Dainaka Lake Minami Site 大中の湖南遺跡 Dainaka-no-ko Minami iseki	Ōmihachiman	Yayoi period settlement trace	Dainaka Lake Minami Site	35°10′22″N 136°07′48″E	1	1598
Chikubu Island 竹生島 Chikubu-shima	Nagahama	also a Place of Scenic Beauty	Chikubu Island	35°25′20″N 136°08′36″E	3	1564
Chausuyama Kofun - Kochausuyama Kofun 茶臼山古墳・小茶臼山古墳 Chausuyama kofun・Kochausuyama kofun	Ōtsu	Kofun period tumulus	Chausuyama Kofun - Kochausuyama Kofun	34°59′25″N 135°53′02″E	1	1553
Tōju Shoin 藤樹書院跡 Tōju shoin ato	Takashima	Edo period Confucianist scholar residence	Tōju Shoin	35°19′17″N 136°01′48″E	4	1557
Dōnoue Site 堂ノ上遺跡 Dōnoue iseki	Ōtsu	Heian period kanga ruins		34°58′19″N 135°54′41″E	2	1604
Minamishigachō temple ruins 南滋賀町廃寺跡 Minamishigachō Haiji ato	Ōtsu	Asuka period temple ruins	Minamishigachō temple ruins	35°02′09″N 135°51′16″E	3	1595
Hiyoshi Taisha Precincts 日吉神社境内 Hiyoshi Taisha keidai	Ōtsu	Famous Shinto shrine	Hiyoshi Taisha Precincts	35°04′23″N 135°51′45″E	3	1599
Shōbodai-ji Stone Tahōtō and Stone Buddhas 廃少菩提寺石多宝塔および石仏 hai-Shōbodaiji seki tahōtō oyobi seki-butsu	Konan	Nara period temple ruins		35°01′37″N 136°03′21″E	3	1561
Hyakusai-ji Precincts 百済寺境内 Hyakusaiji keidai	Higashiōmi	Asuka period Buddhist temple	Hyakusaiji Precincts	35°07′34″N 136°17′32″E	2, 3	00003601
Azuchi-Hyōtanyama Kofun 瓢箪山古墳 Azuchi-Hyōtanyama kofun	Ōmihachiman	Kofun period tumulus	Azuchi-Hyōtanyama Kofun	35°08′32″N 136°08′54″E	1	1594
Binmanji Ishibotokedani Necropolis 敏満寺石仏谷墓跡 Binmanji ishibotoke-dani haka ato	Taga	Sengoku period temple ruins and necropolis		35°12′47″N 136°17′14″E	7	00003456
Kitaōmi Jōkan ruins 北近江城館跡群 Kitaōmi jōkan ato-gun	Nagahama	designation comprises the sites of the Shimosaka clan residence (下坂氏館跡) and Mitamura clan residence (三田村氏館跡)		35°25′04″N 136°18′32″E	2	00003470
Kitabatake Tomoyuki Grave 北畠具行墓 Kitabatake Tomoyuki no haka	Maibara	Kamakura period imperial loyalist	Kitabatake Tomoyuki Grave	35°20′28″N 136°23′27″E	7	1565
Oiso Forest 老蘇森 Oiso-no-mori	Ōmihachiman	Shinto shrine on the Nakasendō	Oiso Forest	35°07′50″N 136°09′41″E	8	1590
Minakuchi Okayama Castle ruins 水口岡山城跡 Minakuchi Okayama-jō ato	Kōka	Sengoku period castle ruins	Minakuchi Okayama Castle ruins	34°58′12″N 136°10′53″E	2	00003968
Nagahara Goten site - Iba Goten site 永原御殿跡及び伊庭御殿跡 Nagahara goten ato oyobi Iba goten ato	Higashiōmi, Yasu	Edo period Shogunal villas		35°05′30″N 136°02′07″E	2	00004096
Genbao Castle ruins 玄藩尾城（内中尾山城）跡 Genbao-jō (Uchinakaoyama-jō) ato	Nagahama	Sengoku period castle ruins; designation includes an area of Tsuruga in Fukui Prefecture	Genbao Castle ruins	35°35′51″N 136°10′23″E	2	3329
Sakamoto Castle Site 坂本城跡; Sakamoto-jō ato	Ōtsu			35°03′30″N 135°52′44″E		

== Prefectural Historic Sites ==
As of 1 May 2024, forty-five Sites have been designated as being of prefectural importance.

Site	Municipality	Comments	Image	Coordinates	Type	Ref.
Awazu Tongū Site 禾津頓宮跡; Awazu tongū ato	Ōtsu			34°59′45″N 135°53′25″E		for all refs see
Former Shōzōbō Gardens 旧正蔵坊庭園 kyū-Shōzōbō teien	Ōtsu			35°00′29″N 135°51′22″E		
Kotō Ware Kiln Sites 湖東焼窯場跡; Kotō-yaki kama-ba ato	Hikone			35°16′40″N 136°16′08″E		
Kaigome Kofun 垣篭古墳; Kaigome Kofun	Nagahama			35°24′13″N 136°19′44″E		
Chausuyama Kofun 茶臼山古墳; Chausuyama kofun	Nagahama			35°24′28″N 136°19′41″E		
Daikichi-ji Site 大吉寺跡; Daikichiji ato	Nagahama			35°28′27″N 136°19′37″E		
Wakamiyama Kofun 若宮山古墳; Wakamiyama kofun	Nagahama			35°26′45″N 136°12′19″E		
Kohori Kofun Cluster 古保利古墳群; Kohori kofun-gun	Nagahama	in part now a national Historic Site		35°28′03″N 136°11′45″E		
Yokoyama Jinja Kofun 横山神社古墳; Yokoyama Jinja kofun	Nagahama			35°29′03″N 136°13′09″E		
Matsuo Miyayama Kofun Cluster 松尾宮山古墳群; Matsuo Miyayama kofun-gun	Nagahama			35°28′28″N 136°12′32″E		
Nishino Water Course 西野水道; Nishino suidō	Nagahama			35°27′59″N 136°11′51″E		
Himezuka Kofun 姫塚古墳; Himezuka kofun	Nagahama			35°28′13″N 136°13′06″E		
Shiotsu Maruyama Kofun 塩津丸山古墳群; Shiotsu Maruyama kofun	Nagahama			35°31′23″N 136°09′13″E		
Morokawa Tile Kiln Site 諸川瓦窯跡; Morokawa kawara kama ato	Nagahama			35°29′03″N 136°07′57″E		
Akada Family Gardens 赤田氏庭園; Akada-shi teien	Nagahama			35°28′04″N 136°18′54″E		
Senzokyō Kofun Cluster 千僧供古墳群; Senzokyō kofun-gun	Ōmihachiman			35°06′16″N 136°07′02″E		
Ima-juku Ichirizuka 今宿一里塚; Ima-juku ichirizuka	Moriyama			35°03′03″N 135°59′14″E		
Anyō-ji Gardens 安養寺庭園; Anyōji teien	Rittō			35°01′00″N 136°00′04″E		
Mikumo Castle Site 三雲城跡; Mikumo=jō ato	Konan			34°58′51″N 136°05′34″E		
Former Tōkaidō Yokota Ferry Site 旧東海道横田渡跡 kyū-Tōkaidō Yokota-wataru ato	Kōka			34°58′54″N 136°07′40″E		
Minakuchi Castle Site 水口城跡; Minakuchi-jō ato	Kōka			34°58′12″N 136°09′56″E		
Ue Site 植遺跡; Ue iseki	Kōka			34°58′31″N 136°08′36″E		
Shigaraki Ware Old Kiln Sites 信楽焼古窯跡群; Shigaraki-yaki koyōseki-gun	Kōka	includes the Nakaide Old Kiln Site (中井出古窯跡)		34°55′47″N 136°05′41″E		
Ogawa Castle Site 小川城跡; Ogawa-jō ato	Kōka			34°50′40″N 136°02′15″E		
Chokushi Kofun Cluster 勅旨古墳群; Chokushi kofun-gun	Kōka			34°53′58″N 136°04′18″E		
Ōzuka Kofun 王塚古墳; Ōzuka kofun	Takashima			35°25′29″N 136°00′57″E		
Kutsuki Jin'ya Site 朽木陣屋跡; Kutsuki jin'ya ato	Takashima			35°21′24″N 135°55′15″E		
Ukawa 48 Buddhas 鵜川四十八体仏; Ukawa shijūhattai Butsu	Takashima			35°16′46″N 136°01′00″E		
Inariyama Kofun 稲荷山古墳; Inariyama kofun	Takashima			35°19′02″N 136°00′51″E		
Ōmizo Domain Branch House Grave Site 大溝藩分部家墓所; Ōmizo-han wakebe-ke bosho	Takashima			33°15′56″N 131°10′52″E		
Hachimansha Kofun Cluster 八幡社古墳群; Hachimansha kofun-gun	Higashiōmi			35°04′56″N 136°08′41″E		
Gotō Fortified Residence Site 後藤館跡; Gotō-yakata ato	Higashiōmi			35°05′11″N 136°08′55″E		
Kanagai Site 金貝遺跡; Kanagai iseki	Higashiōmi			35°06′23″N 136°13′08″E		
Kimura Kofun Cluster 木村古墳群; Kimura kofun-gun	Higashiōmi			35°04′23″N 136°10′06″E		
Hōdō-ji Haiji Site 法堂寺廃寺跡; Hōdōji Haiji ato	Higashiōmi			35°10′53″N 136°10′26″E		
Shōdō Kofun Cluster 勝堂古墳群; Shōdō kofun-gun	Higashiōmi	designation includes Akatsuka Kofun (赤塚古墳), Bentenzuka Kofun (弁天塚古墳) (pictured), Okarayama Kofun (おから山古墳), and Gyōjazuka Kofun (行者塚古墳)		35°09′01″N 136°14′16″E		
Jingō Kamezuka Kofun 神郷亀塚古墳; Jingō Kamezuka kofun	Higashiōmi			35°10′40″N 136°11′02″E		
Burial Mounds to the East of Lake Biwa (Kamigano Kofun Cluster - Hirayanagi Kofun Cluster) 湖東地域の群集墳(上蚊野古墳群・平柳古墳群) kotō-chiiki no gunshū-fun (Kamigano kofun-gun・Hirayanagi kofun-gun)	Aishō, Higashiōmi			35°09′23″N 136°16′32″E		
Aidani Kumahara Site 相谷熊原遺跡; Aidani Kumahara iseki	Higashiōmi			35°04′33″N 136°18′59″E		
Matsuo-ji Site 松尾寺跡; Matsuoji ato	Maibara			35°18′23″N 136°20′10″E		
Yamatsuteru Jinja Kofun 山津照神社古墳; Yamatsuteru Jinja kofun	Maibara			35°19′48″N 136°19′20″E		
Tsukuriya Kiln Site 作谷窯跡; Tsukuriya kama ato	Hino			35°01′04″N 136°11′14″E		
Amamiya Kofun 雨宮古墳; Amamiya kofun	Ryūō			35°02′40″N 136°07′44″E		
Yukino-dera Site 雪野寺跡; Yukino-dera	Ryūō			35°04′20″N 136°08′36″E		
Ougo Kofun オウゴ古墳; Ougo kofun	Ryūō			35°03′36″N 136°06′28″E		

== Municipal Historic Sites ==
As of 1 May 2024, a further eighty-seven Sites have been designated as being of municipal importance.

== See also ==
- Cultural Properties of Japan
- Ōmi Province
- List of Places of Scenic Beauty of Japan (Shiga)
- List of Cultural Properties of Japan - historical materials (Shiga)
