= Shōbodai-ji =

Shōbodai-ji ruins
- 廃少菩提寺 (Japanese)
- Shōbodai-ji temple ruins Shōbodai-ji (Japan)
- 35°01′37″N 136°03′21″E
- Type: temple ruins
- Location: Konan, Shiga, Japan
- Region: Kansai region

Site notes
- Public access: Yes (no public facilities)

The Shōbodai-ji ruins (廃少菩提寺, Haishōbodai-ji) is an archaeological site with the ruins of a Buddhist temple located in the city of Konan, Shiga Prefecture, in the Kansai region of Japan. The ruins were designated a National Historic Site of Japan in 1926, with the area under protection expanded in 1928.

== Overview ==
Shōbodai-ji was founded in 731AD by the priest Ryōben at the request of Emperor Shōmu. The temple was a subsidiary of Kofuku-ji in Nara. Little is known of the temple's history, but per surviving documents, in 1492 the temple was very large, with a Kondō, Pagoda, Lecture Hall, Belfry, Kuri and 37 chapels. In 1570, the temple was completely destroyed by the soldiers of the Rokkaku clan after their defeat by Oda Nobunaga. It was never rebuilt.

All that survives of the temple today is a large Kamakura period Tahōtō stone pagoda, with an inscription giving the date of 1241. This monument is 448 cm in height.

In addition, the ruins of the temple include three stone images of Jizō Bosatsu, the largest of which is 158 cm tall. Jizō is depicted as standing, with a staff in one hand, and with a boat-shaped halo. Also protected within the National Historic Site design a 160-cm carving of Emma surrounded by five images of Buddhas.

The site is about 15 minutes by car from Kōsei Station on the JR West Kusatsu Line.

== See also ==
- List of Historic Sites of Japan (Shiga)
