= Chausuyama Kofun (Ōtsu) =

Kofun period burial mound in Japan

- 茶臼山古墳 (Japanese)
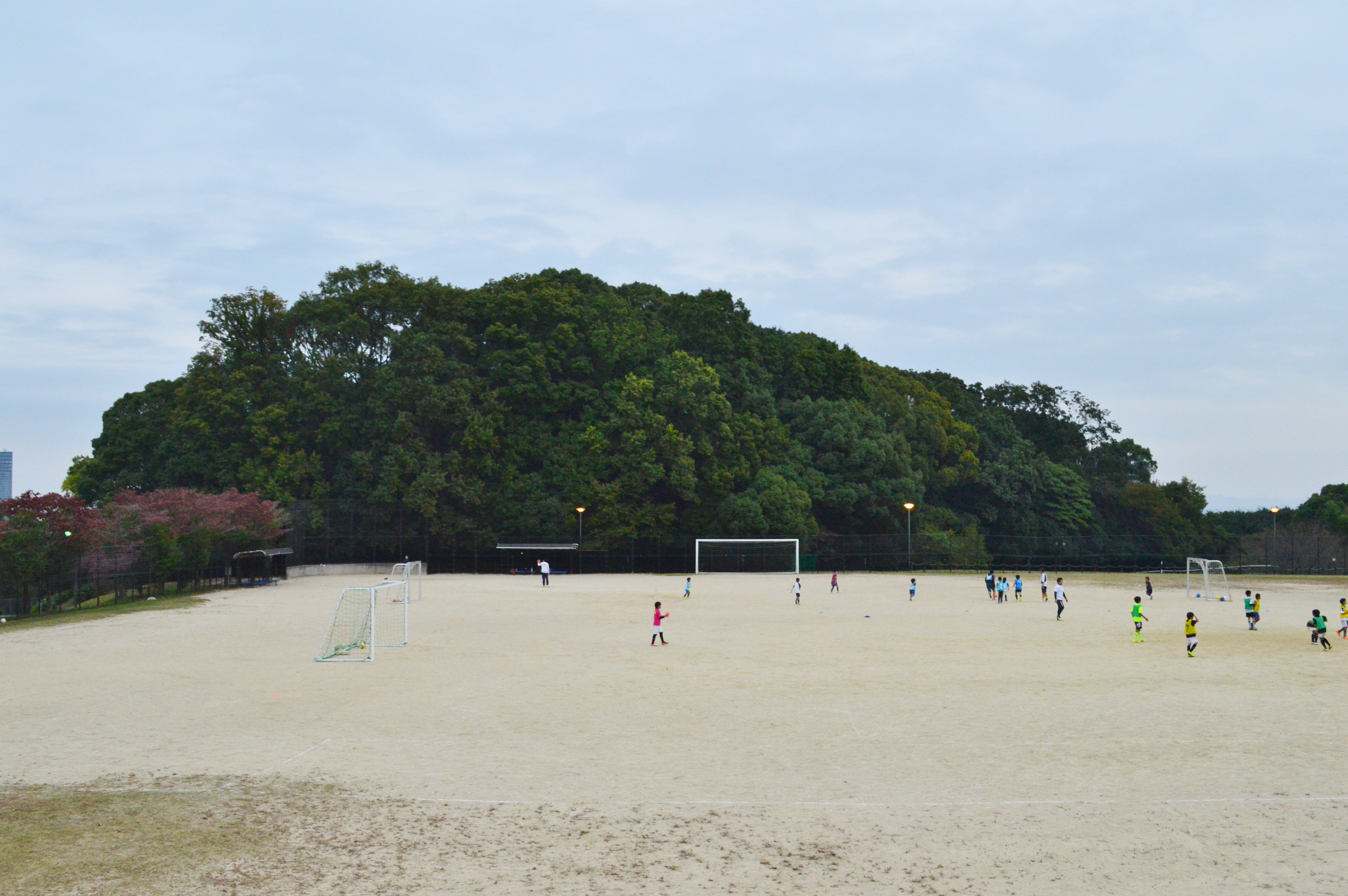
- Chausuyama Kofun

- Chausuyama Kofun Chausuyama Kofun (Ōtsu) (Japan)
- 34°59′25.17″N 135°53′2.45″E ***Suspect**
- Type: Kofun
- Periods: Kofun period
- Location: Ōtsu, Shiga, Japan
- Region: Kansai region

History
- Built: 4th-5th century AD

Site notes
- Public access: Yes (no public facilities)

The Chausuyama Kofun (茶臼山古墳) is a Kofun period burial mound located in the Akibadai neighborhood of Ōtsu, Shiga in the Kansai region of Japan. The tumulus was designated a National Historic Site of Japan in 1921. With a total length of 122 meters, it is the third largest kofun in Shiga Prefecture.

== Overview ==
The Chausuyama Kofun is located on a hill on the southern shore of Lake Biwa. It is a zenpō-kōen-fun (前方後円墳), which is shaped like a keyhole, having one square end and one circular end, when viewed from above, orientated to the east. It was originally covered in fukiishi and the shards of cylindrical and figurative haniwa have been found in the area. The location and construction of the burial chamber remains unknown as it has never been excavated. From its construction technique and haniwa, the tumulus is estimated to have been built from the end of the 4th century to the beginning of the 5th century AD, or the middle of the Kofun period. It is the largest of a cluster of tumuli in the surrounding area, including the Kochausuyama Kofun (小茶臼山古墳), an 18-meter diameter circular-type (empun (円墳)) which is included in the National Historic Site designation.

There is a long tradition connecting this kofun to the family of Prince Ōtomo (c.648 - 672 AD), the son of Emperor Tenji, who committed suicide after his defeat by his uncle Prince Ōama in the Jinshin War.

The tumulus is located about a 15-minute walk from Zezehommachi Station on the Keihan Electric Railway Ishiyama Sakamoto Line.

Overall length
122 meters
Posterior circular portion
70 meter diameter x 8 meter high
"Neck" portion
56 meters wide
Anterior rectangular portion
58 meters wide x 60 meters long

== Gallery ==
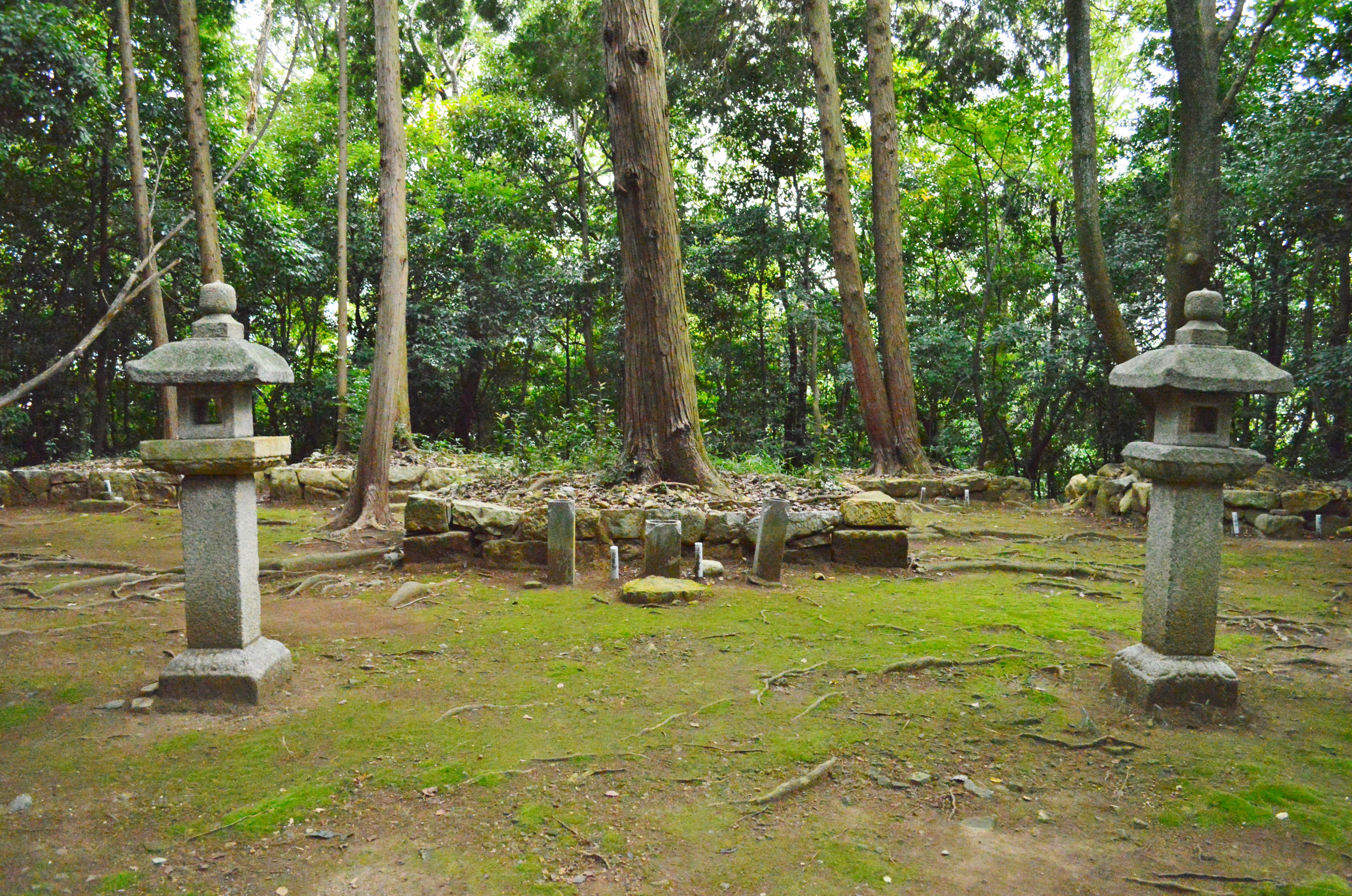
posterior portion

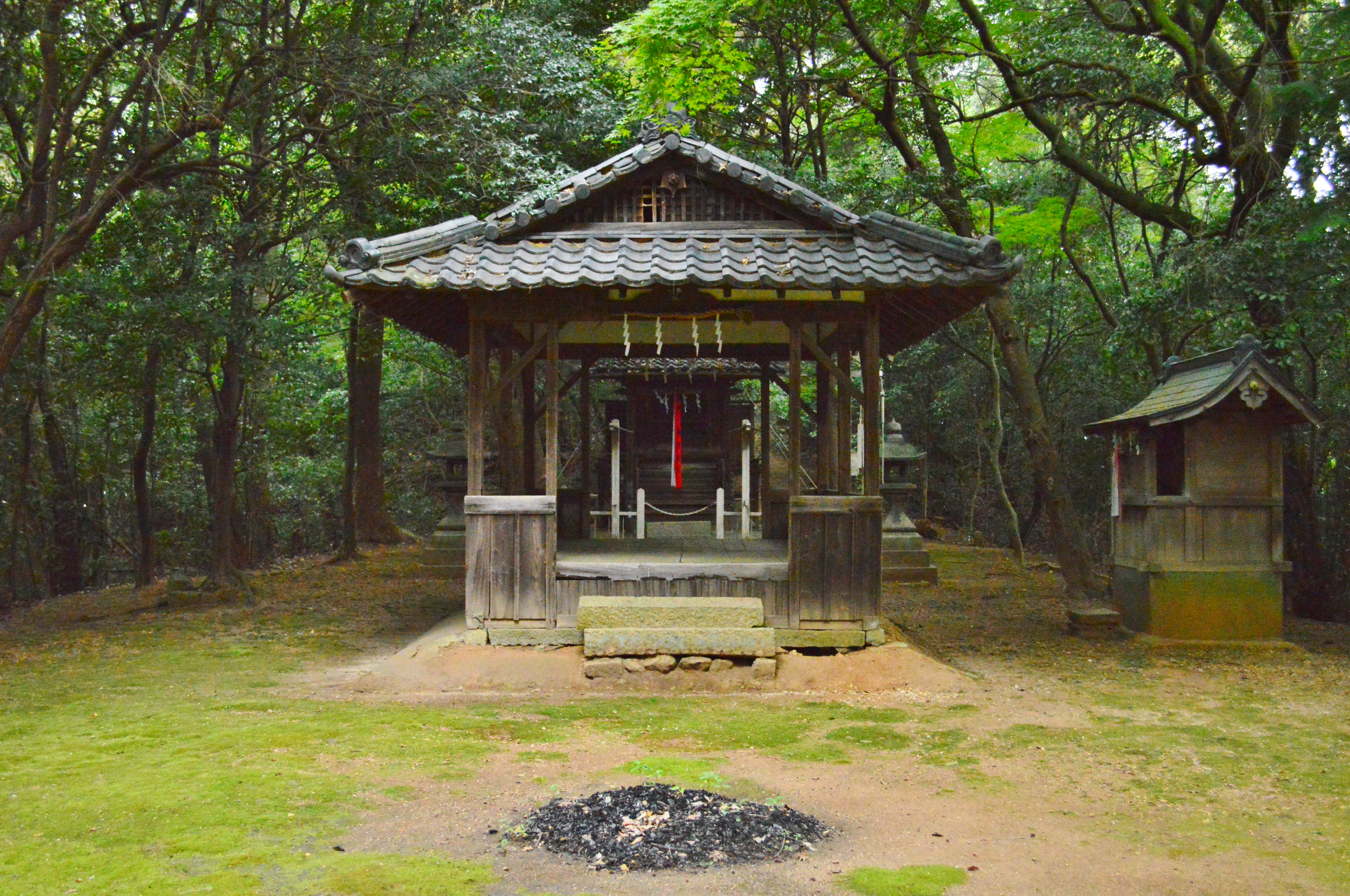
Akiba Shrine located on the saddle of the tumulus

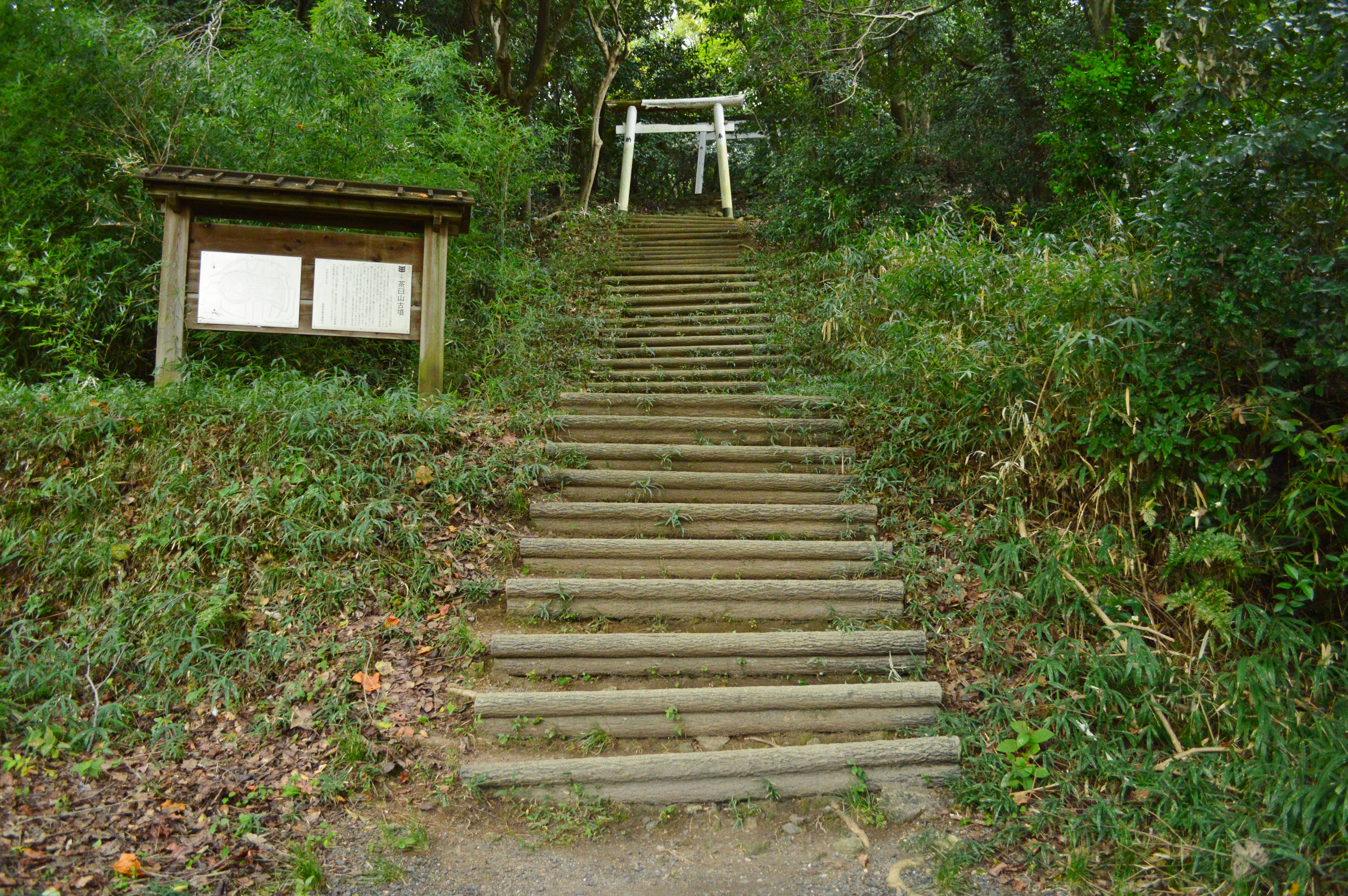
Anterior portion

== See also ==
- List of Historic Sites of Japan (Shiga)
