= Kitaōmi Jōkan ruins =

Japanese national historic site

Kitaōmi Fortification ruins
- 北近江城館跡群
- Nagahama, Shiga Prefecture, Japan

Site information
- Type: flatland-style Japanese castle
- Condition: ruins

Location
- Kitaōmi Fortification ruins Kitaōmi Fortification ruins (Japan)
- Coordinates: 35°25′04″N 136°18′32″E

Site history
- Built: Sengoku period
- In use: Sengoku period
- Demolished: c.1570

The Kitaōmi Fortification ruins (北近江城館跡群, Kitaōmi jōkan ato-gun) the name of a Japanese National Historic Site located in the city of Nagahama in northern Shiga Prefecture in the Kansai region of Japan. The site consists of the Shimosaka clan residence ruins (下坂氏館跡, Shimosaka-ke jōkan ato) and the Mitamura clan residence ruins (三田村氏館跡, Mitamura-ke jōkan).

== Overview ==
The site of Shimosaka clan residence is in the Shimosakanaka-cho neighborhood in the southwestern part of the Nagahama Plain in the northern part of the prefecture. It is located in a very high natural river levee. The Shimosaka were local samurai from this area of Ōmi Province who were recorded as being in the service of the Ashikaga clan from 1336. They were active from the Onin War into the Sengoku period, by which time they had become vassals of the Kyōgoku clan and later the Azai clan. Following the destruction of the Azai clan by then forces of Oda Nobunaga, they abandoned their samurai status and returned to farming; however, even into the Edo period remained involved in the affairs of Hikone Domain. The descendants of the Shimosaka clan still live at and manage this site. The ruined fortified residence consists of an almost square site about 89 meters east-to-west and about 87 meters north-to-south, surrounded by double earthworks with a height of one to two meters and a width of two to five meters. It is surrounded by a three meter wide moat. The main enclosure is surrounded by inner earthworks of about 55 meters east-to-west and about 42 meters north-to-south, and is composed of two sub-enclosures, one on the northeast and the other on the southwest. The sub-enclosure on the southwest is one step higher, and was the location of a final redoubt in the event of an emergency. As a result of an archaeological excavation relics such as Haji ware and imported ceramics from the 14th to 16th centuries were found, and the remains of building foundations, earthworks, drainage channels, staircases were excavated. In 2006 the ruins were designated as a national historic site.

The site of Mitamura clan residence is located in the Mita-cho neighborhood of the city. It was built in the later half of the 15th century, with earthworks and moats rebuilt in the first half of the 16th century. The Mitamura were retainers of the Kyōgoku, and later switched their fealty to the Azai clan, rising to the position of senior vassals. However, in 1570, following the defeat of the Azai clan at the Battle of Anegawa, the clan was executed and their fortified residence was destroyed. The site was designated a national historic site in 2007 and was merged with that of the Shimosaka clan residence site to form the Kitaōmi Fortification ruins site.

The Shimosaka's ruins are about a six-minute drive from Nagahama Station and the Mitamura ruins are about ten minutes by car from Torahime Station, both on the JR West Hokuriku Main Line.

== See also ==
- List of Historic Sites of Japan (Shiga)
