= Kohori Kofun Cluster =

Kofun and Nara period bural mound in Nagahama, Japan

- 古保利古墳群 (Japanese)
- Kohori Kofun Cluster Kohori Kofun Cluster (Japan)
- 35°28′41.83″N 136°11′36.2″E
- Type: Kofun cluster
- Periods: Kofun period
- Location: Nagahama, Shiga, Japan
- Region: Kansai region

History
- Built: 3rd to 6th century AD

Site notes
- Public access: Yes (no public facilities)

The Kohori Kofun Cluster (古保利古墳群) is a group of Kofun to early Nara period burial mounds located in the Takatsuki neighborhood of the city of Nagahama, Shiga Prefecture in the Kansai region of Japan. It was designated a National Historic Site of Japan in 2003. It is the largest kofun cluster in Shiga Prefecture.

== Overview ==
The Kohori Kofun Cluster extends along a three kilometer ridge running north-to-south on Nishinoyama hill facing Shiotsu Bay at the northern end of Lake Biwa. The ridge has an elevation of 200 to 240 meters, and is 100 meters above the surface of Lake Biwa. The cluster consists of seven keyhole-shaped zenpō-kōen-fun (前方後円墳), having one square end and one circular end, when viewed from above, eight "two conjoined rectangles" type (zenpō-kōhō-fun (前方後方墳)), one scallop-shaped hotategai-gata-fun (帆立貝型墳), 79 circular-type (empun (円墳)) and 37 square-type (hōfun (方墳)) for a total of 132 tumuli. These have been divided by archaeologists into six groupings labelled "Group A" through "Group F" during a survey in 1965. The largest is the Nishinoyama Kofun, which has a total length of 90 meters. Most of the circular and square mounds are from 10 to 20 meters in diameter or on each side, with the largest at no more the 30 meters.

The larger zenpō-kōen-fun and zenpō-kōhō-fun are estimated to date from the early Kofun period, or around the beginning of the 3rd century AD. This has been verified by an excavation of the Komatsu Kofun from 1998 to 2000, from which numerous grave goods were recovered, including much earthenware, bronze mirrors and copper and iron products. No haniwa have been recovered from any of the tumuli in the cluster, but fukiishi have been found on some of the earlier tombs. The smaller circular and square tombs date to as late as the early 7th century AD, or into the early Nara period.

The site is unusual not only in the number of tumuli, but in the variety of styles. In addition, although it is on the major highway from the Yamato region to the Sea of Japan, the kofun are visible only from Lake Biwa, indicating that the builders had a strong connection to water transportation on the lake. The site is about ten minutes by car from Takatsuki Station on the JR West Hokuriku Main Line.

Kobori Kofun Cluster main tumuli
Branch	Kofun name		Coordinates	Shape	Scale	Construction time	Remarks
Branch	Branch #	Common name	Coordinates	Shape	Scale	Construction time	Remarks
A	A-1	深谷古墳	35°28′45.08″N 136°11′27.90″E	zenpō-kōen-fun			
A	A-2	西野山古墳	35°28′41.83″N 136°11′36.20″E	zenpō-kōen-fun	length 90m		largest in cluster
A	A-3	A-3号墳		enpun	dia 15m	late Kofun period	Confirmation survey
A	A-5	巳ノ脇古墳					
B	B-1	ヘソ岩古墳	35°28′25.94″N 136°11′40.26″E	hotategai-gata	length 21m		
B	B-6	小松古墳	35°28′20.82″N 136°11′38.95″E	zenpō-kōhō-fun	length 60m	early Kofun period	oldest in cluster Confirmation survey grave goods
B	B-10	木戸古墳		enpun	dia 25m	early Kofun period	Confirmation survey
B	B-16	木戸越古墳	35°28′12.23″N 136°11′40.95″E	zenpō-kōen-fun			
C	C-10	西山古墳					
C	C-16	大浦古墳	35°28′3.74″N 136°11′44.55″E	zenpō-kōhō-fun			
C	C-17	野瀬古墳		enpun	dia 30m	early Kofun period	Confirmation survey
C	C-20	C-20号墳		hōfun	length 22m	mid Kofun period	Confirmation survey
C	C-22	C-22号墳		enpun		final Kofun period	Confirmation survey
D	D-1	寺ヶ浦古墳	35°27′57.66″N 136°11′46.01″E	zenpō-kōen-fun			
D	D-2	臼ヶ谷古墳	35°27′54.58″N 136°11′47.56″E	zenpō-kōhō-fun			
D	D-6	堂山古墳					
D	D-7	堂谷古墳					
D	D-10	南山古墳					
D	D-24	井ノ浦古墳					
D	D-41	北谷古墳	35°27′40.80″N 136°11′56.67″E	zenpō-kōhō-fun			
D	D-42	黒見古墳	35°27′38.69″N 136°11′58.03″E	zenpō-kōen-fun			
E	E-1	上大谷古墳	35°27′34.67″N 136°12′2.31″E	zenpō-kōhō-fun			
E	E-5	岩屋古墳	35°27′30.58″N 136°12′3.92″E	zenpō-kōhō-fun			
E	E-7	蜂谷古墳					
E	E-9	熊野山古墳	35°27′26.71″N 136°12′5.04″E	zenpō-kōhō-fun			
E	E-14	屋ヶ谷古墳	35°27′23.14″N 136°12′7.32″E	zenpō-kōhō-fun			
E	E-15	大谷古墳	35°27′20.72″N 136°12′9.13″E	zenpō-kōen-fun			
F	F-1	旭山古墳	35°27′16.20″N 136°12′11.97″E	zenpō-kōen-fun			

== See also ==
- List of Historic Sites of Japan (Shiga)
