= Minamishigachō temple ruins =

- 南滋賀町廃寺跡 (Japanese)
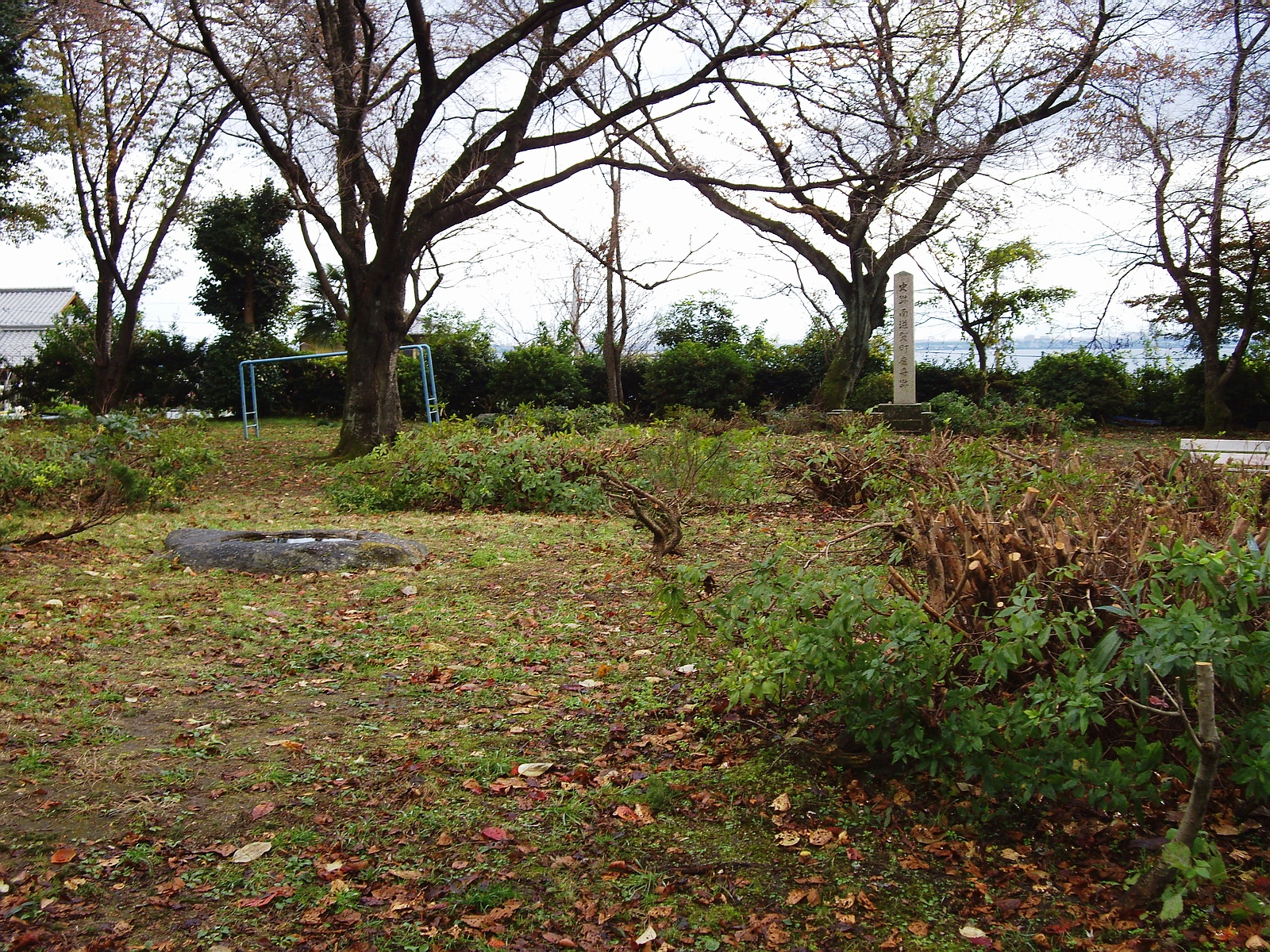
- Minamishigachō temple ruins with foundation stone of pagoda

- Minamishigachō temple ruins Minamishigachō temple ruins (Japan)
- 35°02′09″N 135°51′16″E
- Type: temple ruins
- Periods: Asuka period
- Location: Ōtsu, Shiga, Japan
- Region: Kansai region

Site notes
- Public access: Yes (no public facilities)

The Minamishigachō temple ruins (南滋賀町廃寺跡, Minamishigachō Haiji ato) is an archaeological site with the ruins of an Asuka period Buddhist temple located in the Minamishiga neighborhood of the city of Ōtsu, Shiga Prefecture, in the Kansai region of Japan. The site was designated a National Historic Site of Japan in 1957.

== Overview ==
The Minamishigachō temple site consists of some traces of building foundations arranged in a format similar to Kawara-dera in Asuka, Nara, though much of the site is covered by modern buildings.

The temple had a pagoda in the east and a small Kondō in the west, with a main Kondō and a Lecture Hall in a line to the north. The Kondō and Middle Gate were connected with a cloister, which formed a courtyard surrounding the pagoda and small Kondō, whereas the Lecture Hall was in the middle of a separate courtyard surrounded on three sides by monks' quarters. The roof tiles found are slightly larger than those found at Kawara-dera, but have the same compound lotus flower motif used at that time, and other temples from the Hakuho period. These tiles were fired at the climbing kiln of the Hannokihara ruins, which is about 200 meters west of the ruins of this abandoned temple.

The site is roughly contemporary with the Ōmi Ōtsu Palace, but does not appear in any historical documentation, and even the name of the temple is unknown. It is believed to have survived into the Heian period. The site, which was backfilled after excavation, is located about a five-minute walk from the Minami-Shiga Station on the Keihan Electric Railway Ishiyama Sakamoto Line.

The southeastern side of the temple site is preserved as a park, with information placards. The park contains some foundation stones for the cloister and one of the monk's residences in situ, as well as the central foundation stone for the pagoda, which was relocated to the park after being discovered in the garden of a nearby private house in 1933. This pagoda foundation is a granite block 1.5 by 1.8 meters, with a central hole with a diameter of 21.2 cm and depth of 18.2 cm. From the size of this foundation stone, it is estimated that the pagoda had a height of around 30 meters, indicating the large scale of this temple when originally completed.

== See also ==
- List of Historic Sites of Japan (Shiga)
