= Kasugayama Kofun Cluster (Ōtsu) =

Ancient burial mounds in Ōtsu, Kansai, Japan

- 春日山古墳群 (Japanese)
- Kasugayama Kofun Cluster Kasugayama Kofun Cluster (Ōtsu) (Japan)
- 35°07′15″N 135°54′27″E
- Type: Kofun cluster
- Periods: Kofun period
- Location: Ōtsu, Shiga, Japan
- Region: Kansai region

History
- Built: 4th to 7th century AD

Site notes
- Public access: Yes (no public facilities)

The Kasugayama Kofun Cluster (春日山古墳群) is a group of Kofun to early Nara period burial mound located between the Manotaniguchi neighborhood of the city of Ōtsu, Shiga in the Kansai region of Japan. A portion of this tumuli cluster was designated a National Historic Site of Japan in 1974.

== Overview ==
The Kasugayama Kofun Cluster is located on a ridge with an elevation of 160 meters, overlooking Lake Biwa and the Katata Plain near Mount Kasuga, approximately one kilometer west of the JR West Katata Station. The Mano District, where these tumuli are located, was controlled during the Kofun period by the Wani clan, a powerful clan based in what is now Tenri, Nara, and it be believed that these tombs are those of various members of that clan. The site was investigated by the Shiga Prefectural Board of Education in 1968, at which time a total of 171 tumuli were recorded, and which were divided into Group A through Group E. Subsequent surveys, including a major effort in 1994, discovered more tumuli, and the total is now more than 220.

Two of the 32 tumuli in Group E were keyhole-shaped zenpō-kōen-fun (前方後円墳), having one square end and one circular end, when viewed from above, which are believed to have been built in the latter half of the 4th century AD to the beginning of the 5th century.. All of the other tumuli are circular-type (empun (円墳)) and were built between the middle of the 6th century and the first half of the 7th century AD. Only the two keyhole-shaped tumuli are covered by the National Historic Site designation. These tumuli are designed "Mound No. 1" and "Mound No. 12". Neither has been excavated, so the details of their burial chambers and grave goods is unknown. It is assumed that Mound No. 12 was built first because it is located at the highest part of the ridge. The area is now preserved as a park.

Mound No.1

Overall length
65 meters
Posterior circular portion
32 meter diameter
Anterior rectangular portion
20 meters wide

Mound No.12

Overall length
54 meters
Posterior circular portion
27 meter diameter
Anterior rectangular portion
15 meters wide

== See also ==
- List of Historic Sites of Japan (Shiga)
