= Nagahara Goten =

- 永原御殿跡
- Yasu, Shiga Prefecture, Japan

Site information
- Type: flatland-style Japanese castle
- Open to the public: no public facilities
- Condition: ruins

Location
- Nagahara Goten Nagahara Goten (Japan)
- Coordinates: 35°05′30″N 136°02′07″E

Site history
- Built: 1601
- Built by: Tokugawa Ieyasu
- In use: Edo period
- Demolished: 1684

Nagahara Goten (永原御殿) was an early Edo period Japanese castle located in what is now the city of Yasu, Shiga Prefecture, in the Kansai region of Japan. Its ruins have been protected as a National Historic Site since 2020.

== History ==
The Nagahara Goten was one of a series of fortified residences established in the early Edo period for the formal visits of the Shogun to Kyoto. The Nagahama Goten was established shortly after the 1601 Battle of Sekigahara and was first used by Tokugawa Ieyasu for his triumphal entry into Kyoto. Whereas post stations on the long-established Tōkaidō and Nakasendō highways had hatago with luxurious accommodations suitable for the use of daimyō and officials of the shōgunate, such accommodations were not deemed suitable for the Shōgun himself in the strictly hierarchical social structure of the time. Considering the assassination of Oda Nobunaga in the 1582 Honnō-ji Incident, Tokugawa Ieyasu was especially concerned with his personal security, and wherever possible stayed at the castles of shinpan or fudai daimyō, who were required to build a special palace within their most secure inner bailey exclusively for his use. However, along they route of the highways in Ōmi province, there were few such castles, and instead, four fortified residences were erected: Nagahara, Iba (Higashiōmi), Minakuchi (Koka), and Kashiwabara (Maibara).

The name "Goten" implies a palace, but the structure built was essentially a flatlands-style Japanese castle. In the case of Nagahama, a central enclosure was protected by a moat and yagura turrets, which was expanded in 1634 by a Ni-no-maru (Second Bailey) and San-no-maru (Third Bailey), each with its own moats, stone walls and yagura at each corner. Construction work was directly managed by the shogunate, who commandeered the resources and manpower of Zeze Domain for labor and materials. In the case of the 1634 expansion, this involved 44,000 carpenters who constructed some 50 structures within the enclosures, including kitchens, barracks for troops accompanying the shogun.

The Nagahara Goten was used a total of only nine times: six by Tokugawa Ieyasu, twice by Tokugawa Hidetada, and once by Tokugawa Iemitsu. After Tokugawa Iemitsu, the shoguns stopped visiting Kyoto, and the various "Goten" were abolished in 1684 and their structures were sold off or demolished. The site of the Nagahara Hoten is now covered by paddy fields, bamboo groves and private houses, with only some remnants of the moats surviving. Two structures from the Nagahara Goten are known to have survived to the present. One structure is the gate of the Buddhist temple of Josen-ji in Yasu. The other is the Shoin of the Ashiura Kannon-ji temple in Kusatsu, Shiga. This structure is an Important Cultural Property.

== See also ==
- List of Historic Sites of Japan (Shiga)
