= Ōmi Kokuchō =

Ōmi Kokuchō ruins
- 近江国庁跡 (Japanese)
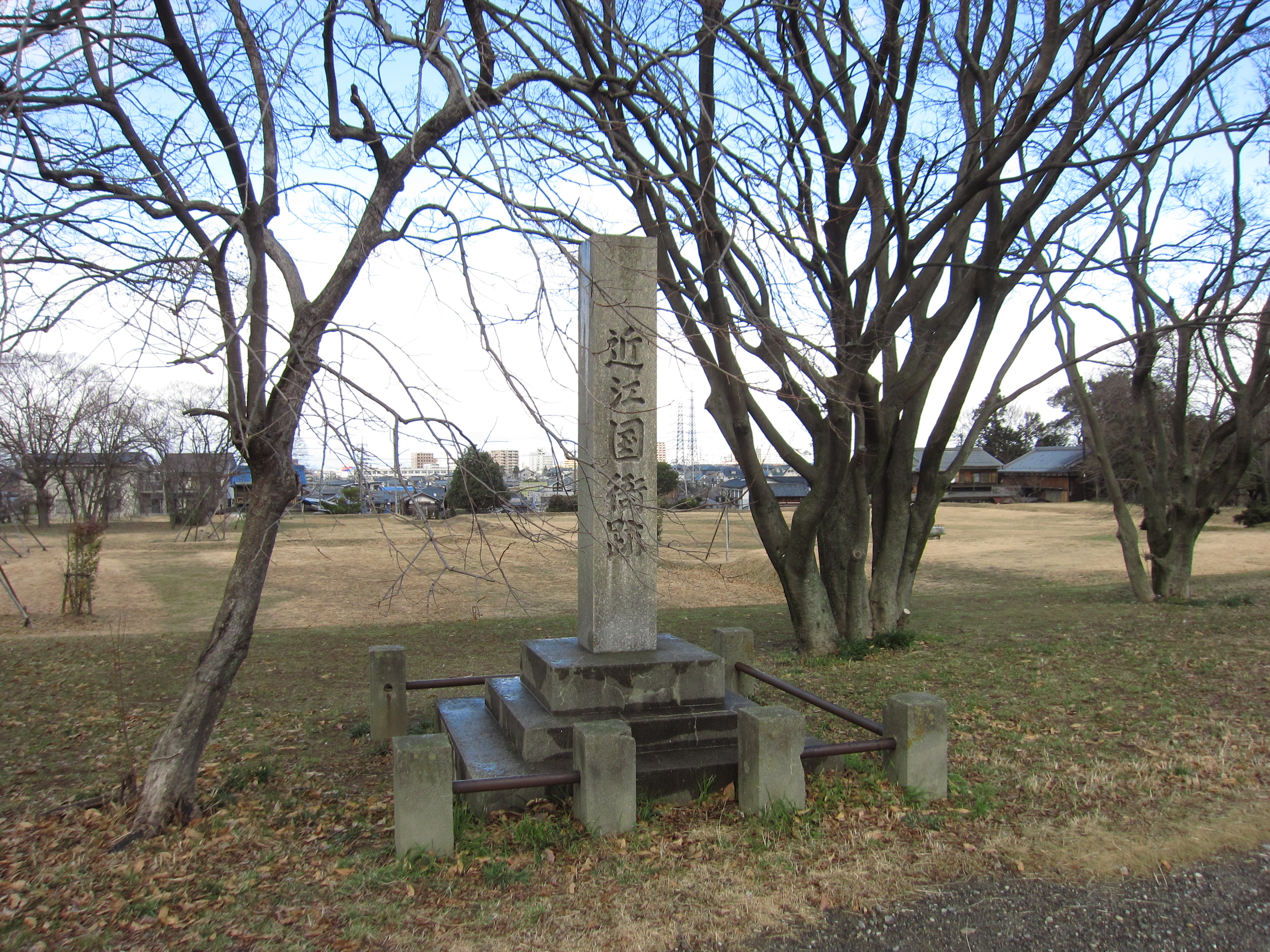
- Ōmi Kokuchō ruins

- Ōmi Provincial Capital ruins Ōmi Kokuchō (Japan)
- 34°58′28.4″N 135°55′12.4″E
- Periods: Nara - Heian period
- Location: Ōtsu, Shiga, Japan
- Region: Kansai region

Site notes
- Public access: Yes (park)

The Ōmi Provincial Capital ruins (近江国庁跡, Ōmi Kokuchō ato) is an archaeological site with the ruins of a Nara to Heian period government administrative complex located in what is now the Ōe neighborhood of the city of Ōtsu, Shiga prefecture in the Kansai region of Japan. Identified as the ruins of the kokufu (provincial capital) of Ōmi Province, the site has been protected as a National Historic Site since 1973.

== Overview ==
In the late Nara period, after the establishment of a centralized government under the Ritsuryō system, local rule over the provinces was standardized under a kokufu (provincial capital), and each province was divided into smaller administrative districts, known as (郡, gun, kōri), composed of 2–20 townships in 715 AD. The kokufu complex contained the official residence and offices of the kokushi, the official sent from the central government as provincial governor, along with buildings housing offices concerned with general administration, farming, finance, police, and military. In the periphery there was a provincial school (kokugaku), the garrison, and storehouses for taxes.

The Ōmi Provincial Capital ruins were first identified in academia in 1935. At the time, this was the first of the original kokufu complexes as described in the Wamyō Ruijushō from 935 AD to have been located. It was first excavated from 1963 to 1965. The site covers an area of approximately eight or nine chō and is a double concentric enclosure, with each enclosure surrounded by a moat and earthen rampart with a wooden palisade. The complex measures 72.8 meters from east-to-west by 109 meters from north-to-south. Within the inner enclosure was a raised earthen platform containing the foundation stones of the government complex. The main hall was a 7 x 5 bay building, with a second hall behind it that was slightly smaller at 6 x 5 bays. The front building was flanked by halls to the east and west, forming a U-shaped courtyard, and these side buildings were connected to the main hall by corridors. The main building had dimensions of approximately 23.1 meters by 15 meters.

Excavation revealed that there were two phases of construction. The first phase was from the middle of the Nara period, and the second was from the end of the Nara period to the early Heian period. The complex was abandoned sometime around the end of the 10th century.

The site is located about 10 minutes by walking from the "Jinryodanchi" bus stop on the Ohmi Railway Bus from Ishiyama Station on the JR Central Tōkaidō Main Line.

The National Historic Site designation includes three outlying areas:

- The Sōyama Site (惣山遺跡) has the foundations for twelve granaries that were used for storing of taxation rice. These ruins are located about 500 meters southeast of the Ōmi Provincial Capital ruins and the site was added to the designated area in 1998.
- The Aoei Site (青江遺跡) is located 300 meters south of the south gate of the Ōmi Provincial Capital ruins. It is a smaller moated and palisaded enclosure, and contains the remains of buildings from three construction phases in a planned arrangement. The purpose of these buildings are unknown, but as the roof tiles are identical to the roof tiles used in both the Soyama Site and the Ōmi Provincial Capital site, it is believed to contain some of the offices which made up the provincial government administration. Pottery with the words "Tempyo Shoko" and ink stones have been found as evidence for this claim. It was added to the designated area in 2005.
- The Chūroi Site (中路遺跡) consist of two building traces located to the northwest of the Aoe Site. The same roof tiles as found in the Ōmi Provincial Capital ruins have been excavated, and the position of these ruins indicates that it may have been the location of the official residence of the governor. It was added to the designated area in 2009.

== Gallery ==
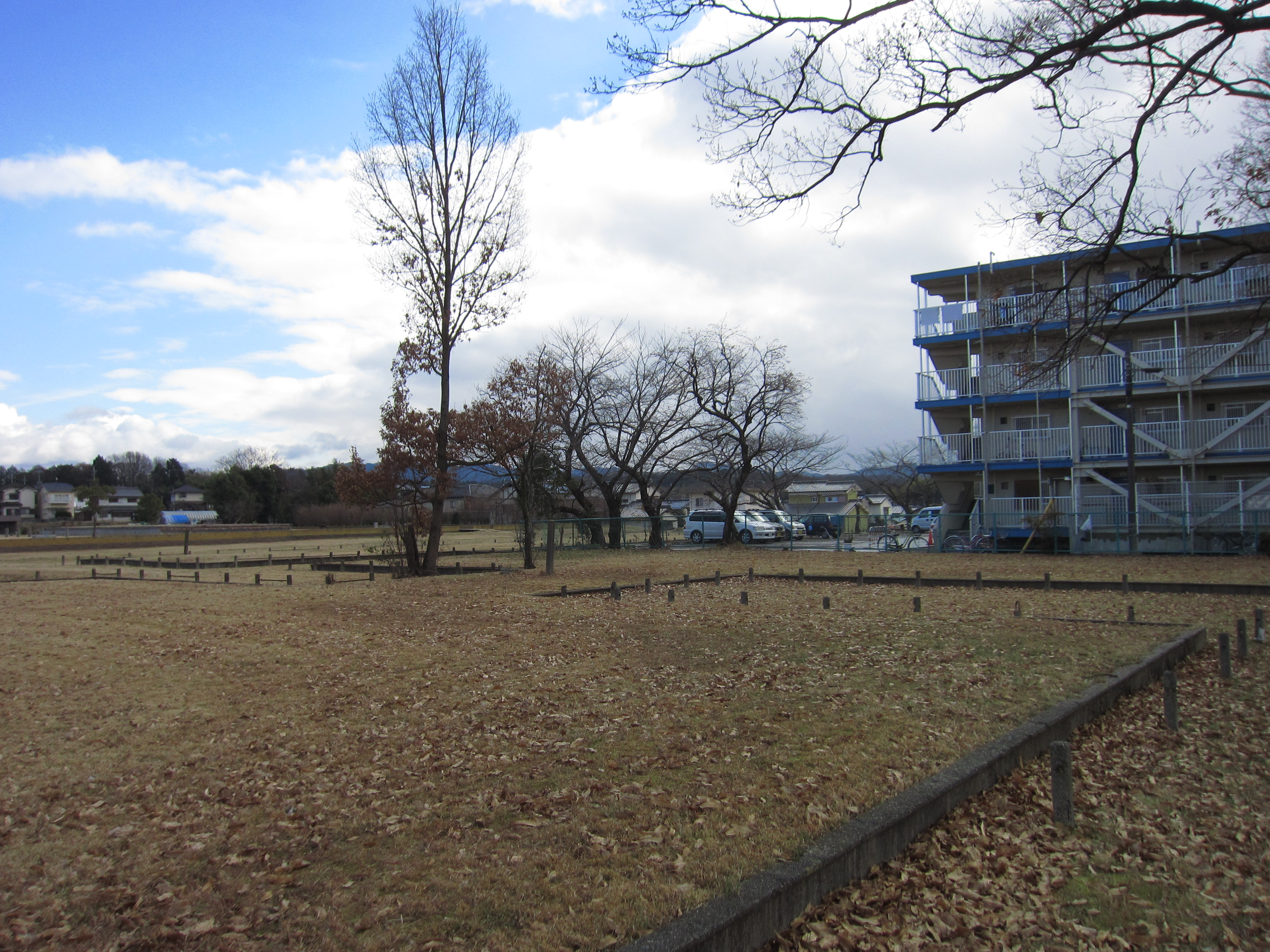
国庁跡
Panoramic view of site

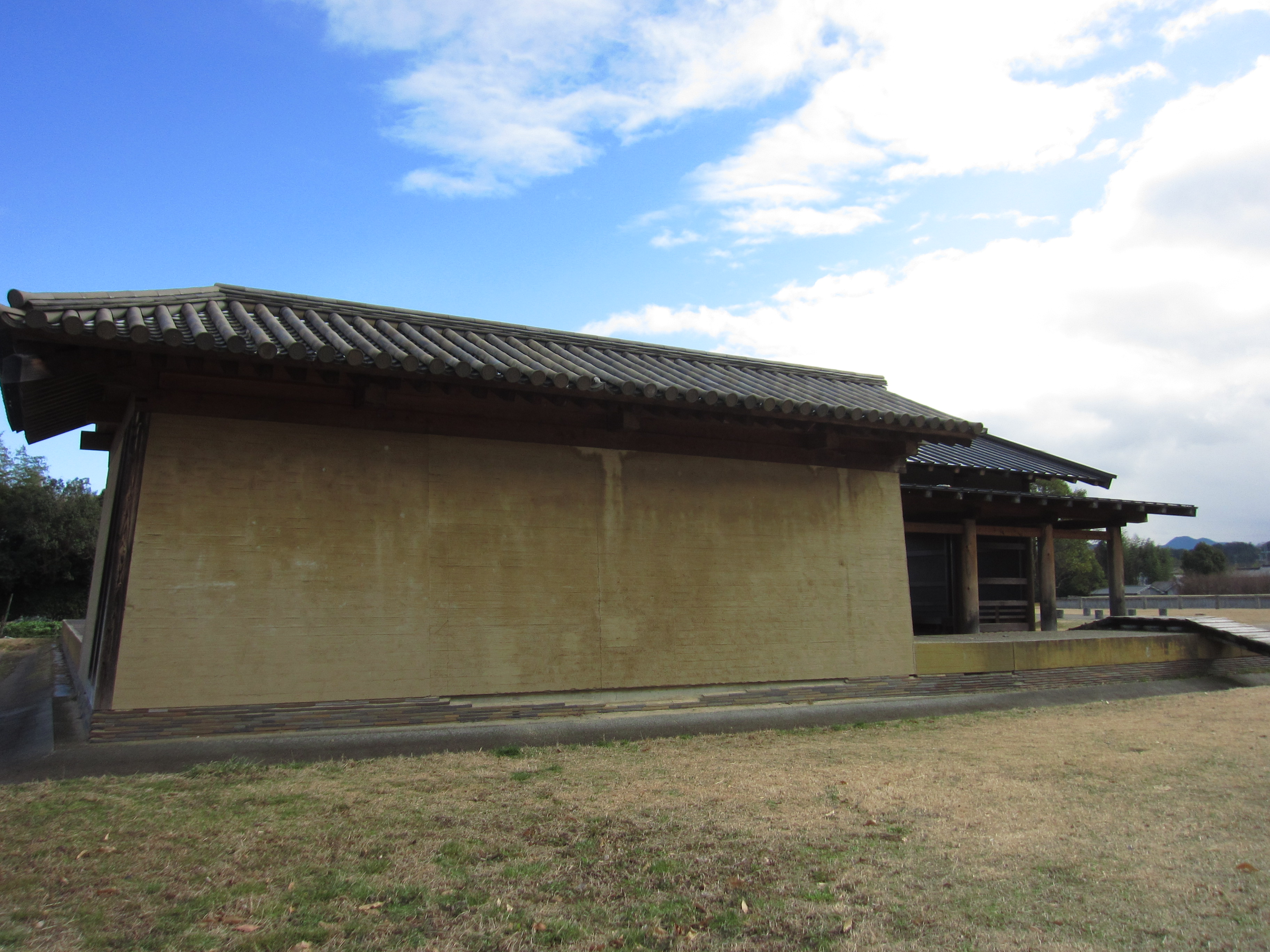
Reconstructed portion of rampart

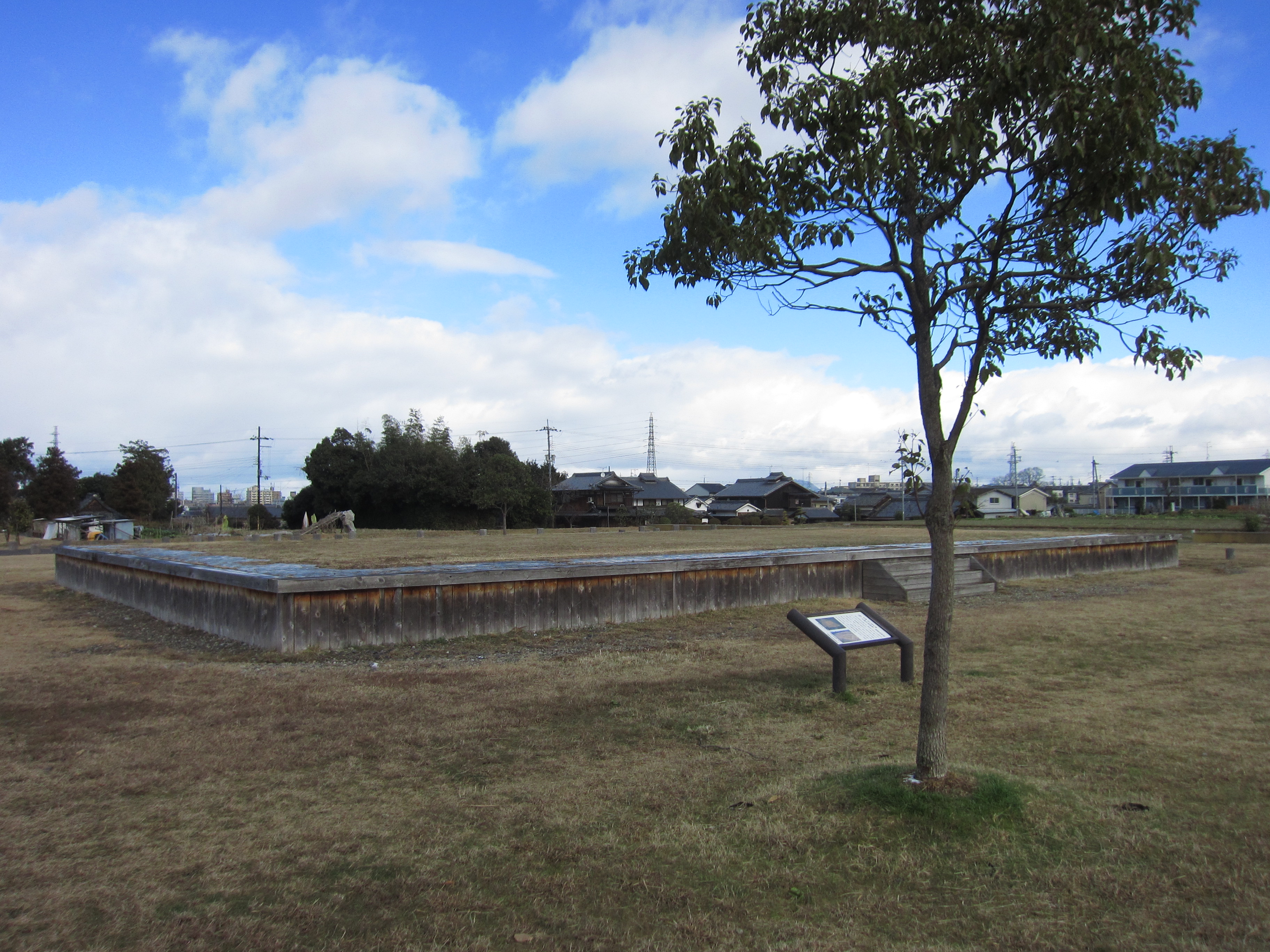
Reconstructed foundation platform

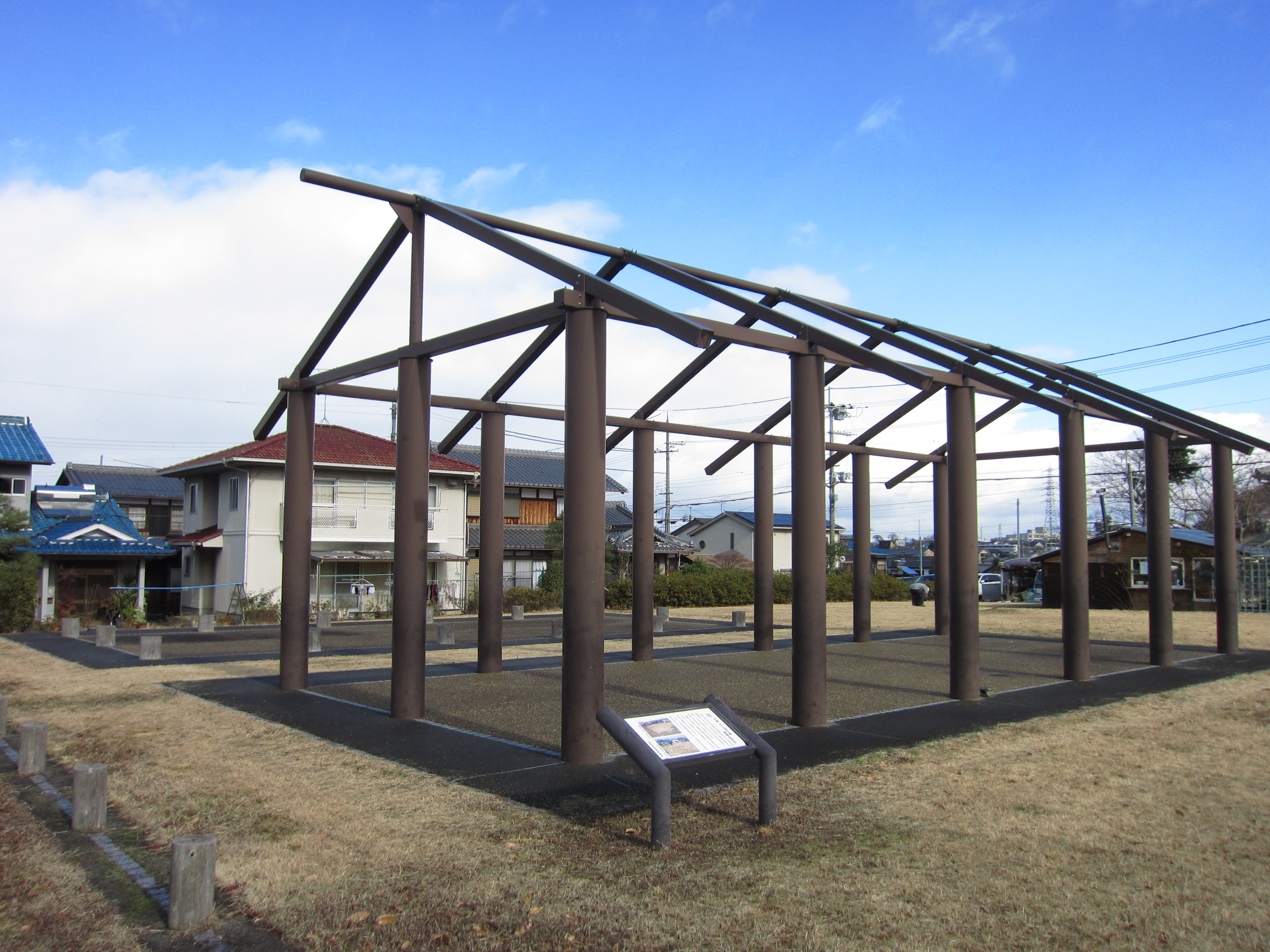
Reconstructed framework of a building

== See also ==
- List of Historic Sites of Japan (Shiga)
