= Ōmi Ōtsu Palace =

- 近江大津宮 (Japanese)
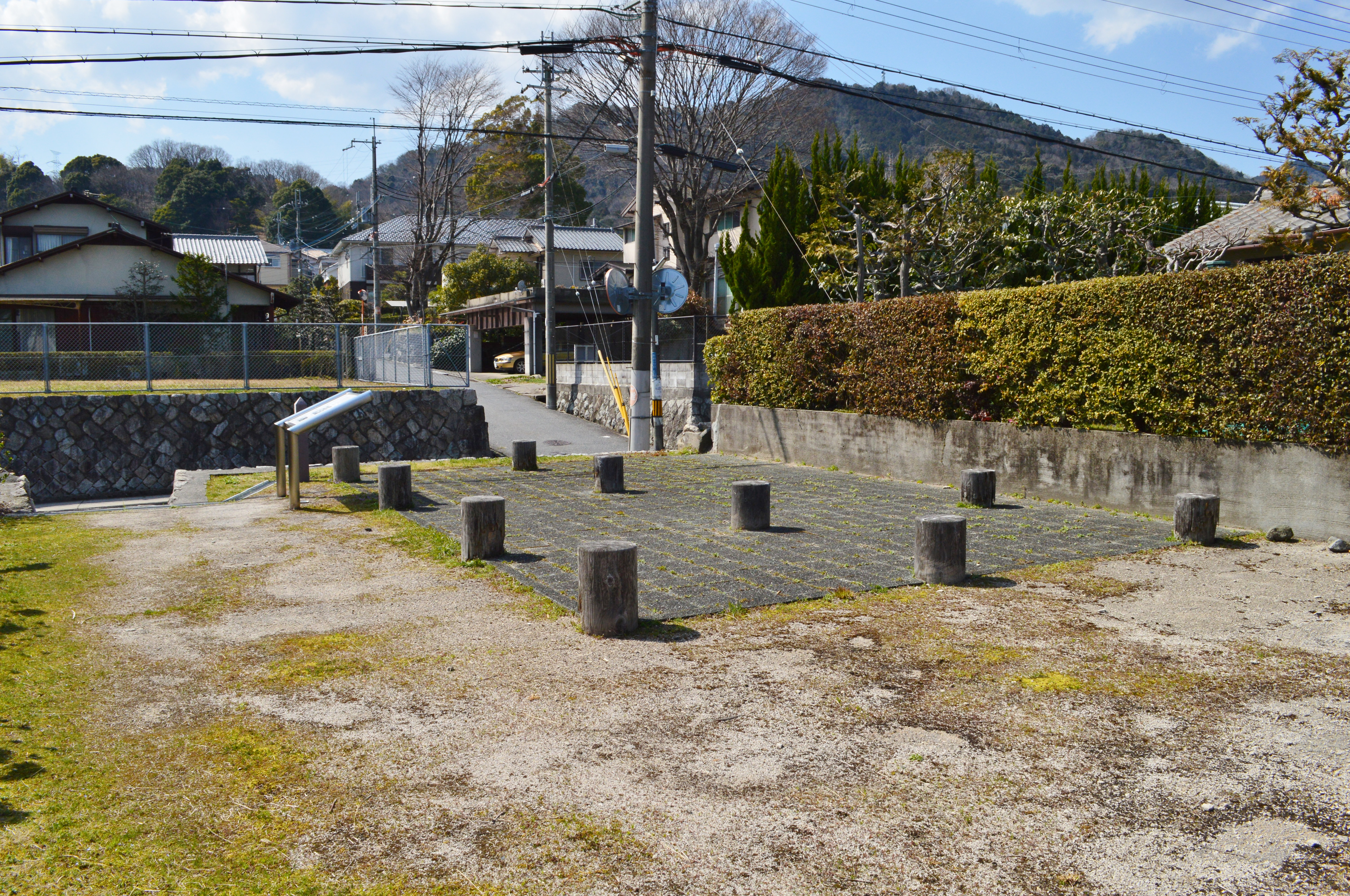
- A section of the Ōmi Ōtsu Palace ruins in a suburb of modern day Ōtsu

- Ōmi Ōtsu Palace Ōmi Ōtsu Palace (Japan)
- 35°1′41.9″N 135°51′18.0″E
- Type: palace ruins
- Periods: Asuka period
- Location: Ōtsu, Shiga, Japan
- Region: Kansai region

History
- Built: 7th century AD

Site notes
- Public access: Yes (no public facilities)

The Ōmi Ōtsu Palace (近江大津宮, Ōmi Ōtsu-no-miya) was an imperial palace built by Emperor Tenchi in Asuka period Japan in what is now the city of Ōtsu, Shiga Prefecture, Japan. It served as the capital of Japan for a five-year period from 667 to 672 AD. Also known as the Ōtsu Palace (大津宮, Ōtsu-no-miya), or Shiga no Miyako (志賀の都), it was most frequently referred to in ancient sources as the Ōmi Ōtsu-no-miya (水海大津宮). It was at this location that the Ōmi Code and the family registry system were promulgated, which laid the foundations for the later ritsuryō state. Its location was designated a National Historic Site of Japan in 1979, with the area under protection expanded in 2007

== History ==
In 660 AD, during the reign of Empress Saimei, the Korean kingdom of Baekje fell to an alliance of Silla and Tang China. Baekje was a close ally of ancient Japan, viewed as a bulwark against possible Silla or Tang expansion and Yamato's foothold in the mainland. Crown Prince Naka no Ōe, later Emperor Tenji, and Empress Saimei decided to dispatch an expeditionary force to restore the Baekje kingdom, though the Empress died before this could happen and Japan was decisively defeated by the Silla-Tang alliance at the Battle of Baekgang in 663 AD. This ended Japanese involvement in the Korean Peninsula for centuries, and fearing that Japan would be subject to a counter-invasion by Silla-Tang armies, a large number of mountain-top castles were constructed across western Japan. It was with this background that Emperor Tenchi decided to relocate the capital from Asuka to the shore of Lake Biwa in Ōmi Province.

The reason for the transfer is not entirely clear. It is speculated that the location of the new capital on the shores of Lake Biwa facilitated communications and transportation to the Sea of Japan coast, and the location was on the major ancient Tōsandō and Hokurikudō highways. Another possible reason was that the emperor felt the need to relocate from the entrenched political factions and interests in Asuka in order to have a freer hand at the radical reforms necessary to create a new political system to counter the threats from abroad. In any case, per the Nihon Shoki, there was great dissatisfaction in Asuka regarding the move, which led to major riots and arson.

Emperor Tenji died in 671. He had originally designated his brother, Prince Ōama, as his successor, but later changed his mind in favor of his son, Prince Ōtomo. This led to the Jinshin War, during which Prince Ōtomo killed himself after reigning for less than a year, and the Ōtsu Palace was burned down. Prince Ōama succeeded to the throne as the Emperor Tenmu, and moved the capital back to Asuka.

In the Nara period, the capital was moved to Heijō-kyō, and the provincial capital of Ōmi Province was built at Seta (now a neighborhood of the city of Ōtsu). The site of the ruins of Ōtsu Palace was named Furutsu (古津), meaning "old port", but the name was restored to "Ōtsu" by order of Emperor Kanmu. However, over time, the exact location of the palace became lost in later centuries, and especially with growing nationalism in the late Meiji era and the Taishō era, there was a strong desire to relocate it. Theories were advanced whenever ruins were found in the approximate location, which included the sites of Sūfuku-ji and the Minamishigachō temple ruins amongst many other possible candidates. As the palace existed for only five years and did not make use of roof tiles, very little physical evidence survived.

In 1974, during rescue archaeology on the site of a new residential area in the Nishikiori neighborhood of Ōtsu, 13 pillar holes which are thought to have been the remnants of a monumental south-facing gate were discovered. Further archaeological excavations have found Sue and Haji ware pottery, the presence of a double corridor extending from the South Gate to a large main hall, and the remnants of moats and earthen ramparts. The layout of structures were similar to that of the Naniwa Palace which had been discovered in Osaka and which was nearly contemporary with the Ōtsu Palace. The total area of the Ōtsu Palace site is estimated to be 700 meters north-to-south by 400 meters east-to-west. The site has been preserved as an archaeological park.

The ruins of the Ōmi Ōtsu Palace are located in the western part of modern city of Ōtsu, about 500 meters north of JR West Nishi-Ōtsu Station or a two-minute walk from Ōmijingūmae Station on the Keihan Electric Railway Ishiyama Sakamoto Line.

== See also ==
- List of Historic Sites of Japan (Shiga)

== Notes ==
Preceded by Asakura no Tachibana no Hironiwa no Miya	Capital of Japan; 667 - 672	Succeeded by Asuka-kyō
