= List of places of scenic beauty of Japan (Shiga) =

This list is of the places of scenic beauty of Japan located within the Prefecture of Shiga.

== National Places of Scenic Beauty ==
As of 1 July 2021, twenty-two Places have been designated at a national level.

| Site | Municipality | Comments | Image | Coordinates | Type | Ref. |
|---|---|---|---|---|---|---|
| Enman-in Gardens 円満院庭園; Enman-in teien | Ōtsu | also an Historic Site | | 35°00′50″N 135°51′12″E | 1 | |
| Enryaku-ji Sakamoto Satobō Gardens 延暦寺坂本里坊庭園; Enryakuji Sakamoto satobō teien | Ōtsu | designation includes the gardens of Sōgon-in (雙厳院庭園), Hōshaku-in (宝積院庭園), Shiga-in Monzeki (滋賀院門跡庭園), Butsujō-in (佛乗院庭園), the former Byakugō-in (旧白毫院庭園), the former Chikurin-in (旧竹林院庭園), Renge-in (蓮華院庭園), Ritsu-in (律院庭園), Jitsuzōbō (実蔵坊庭園), and Juryō-in (寿量院庭園) | | 35°04′17″N 135°51′56″E | 1 | |
| Kutsuki Pond Marshland Gardens 朽木池の沢庭園; Kutsuki-ike no sawa-teien | Takashima | | | 35°21′03″N 136°02′21″E | 1 | |
| Former Shūrin-ji Gardens 旧秀隣寺庭園; Kyū-Shūrinji teien | Takashima | | | 35°20′45″N 135°54′31″E | 1 | |
| Former Hikone Domain Matsubara Shimoyashiki (Ohama Goten) Gardens 旧彦根藩松原下屋敷（お浜御殿）庭園; Kyū-Hikone-han Matsubara shimoyashiki (ohama goten) teien | Hikone | | | 35°17′11″N 136°15′02″E | 1 | |
| Isome Family Gardens 居初氏庭園; Isome-shi teien | Ōtsu | | | 35°06′50″N 135°55′21″E | 1 | |
| Kongōrin-ji Myōju-in Gardens 金剛輪寺明壽院庭園; Kongōrinji Myōju-in teien | Aishō | | | 35°09′47″N 136°16′47″E | 1 | |
| Keiunkan Gardens 慶雲館庭園; Keiunkan teien | Nagahama | | | 35°22′33″N 136°15′59″E | 1 | |
| Genkyūrakuraku-en 玄宮楽々園; Genkyūrakuraku-en | Hikone | | | 35°16′43″N 136°15′13″E | 1 | |
| Konomiya Jinja Offices Gardens 胡宮神社社務所庭園; Konomiya Jinja shamusho teien | Taga | | | 35°12′53″N 136°17′14″E | 1 | |
| Kōjō-in Gardens 光浄院庭園; Kōjō-in teien | Ōtsu | also an Historic Site | | 35°00′50″N 135°51′09″E | 1, 8 | |
| Jōshin-ji Gardens 浄信寺庭園; Jōshinji teien | Nagahama | | | 35°30′23″N 136°13′32″E | 1 | |
| Saimyō-ji Honpō Gardens 西明寺本坊庭園; Saimyōji Honpō teien | Kōra | | | 35°10′58″N 136°17′08″E | 1 | |
| Samegai Valley 醒井峡谷; Samegai kyōkoku | Maibara | | | 35°18′06″N 136°20′39″E | 3, 6 | |
| Seigan-ji Gardens 青岸寺庭園; Seiganji teien | Maibara | | | 35°18′53″N 136°17′44″E | 1 | |
| Zenpō-in Gardens 善法院庭園; Zenpō-in teien | Hikone | also an Historic Site | | 35°00′48″N 135°51′00″E | 1 | |
| Taga Taisha Inner Shoin Gardens 多賀神社奥書院庭園; Taga Jinja oku-shoin teien | Taga | | | 35°13′31″N 136°17′28″E | 1 | |
| Ōsumi Family Gardens 大角氏庭園; Ōsumi-shi teien | Rittō | | | 35°01′28″N 136°01′08″E | 1 | |
| Daitsū-ji Ganzanken and Rantei Gardens 大通寺含山軒および蘭亭庭園; Daitsūji Ganzanken oyobi Rantei teien | Nagahama | | | 35°23′01″N 136°16′10″E | 1 | |
| Chikubu Island 竹生島; Chikubu-shima | Nagahama | also an Historic Site | | 35°25′20″N 136°08′36″E | 8 | |
| Fukuden-ji Gardens 福田寺庭園; Fukudenji teien | Maibara | | | 35°21′05″N 136°17′07″E | 1 | |
| Hyōzu Jinja Gardens 兵主神社庭園; Hyōzu Jinja teien | Yasu | | | 35°06′54″N 136°00′37″E | 1 | |

== Prefectural Places of Scenic Beauty ==
As of 1 May 2020, eighteen Places have been designated at a prefectural level.

| Site | Municipality | Comments | Image | Coordinates | Type | Ref. |
|---|---|---|---|---|---|---|
| Seian-ji Gardens 盛安寺庭園; Seianji teien | Ōtsu | | | 35°03′29″N 135°52′06″E | | for all refs see |
| Karasaki 唐崎(唐崎神社境内); Karasaki (Karasaki Jinja keidai) | Ōtsu | | | 35°02′50″N 135°52′27″E | | |
| Shōjuraigō-ji Gardens 聖衆来迎寺庭園; Shōjuraigōji teien | Ōtsu | | | 35°04′21″N 135°53′09″E | | |
| Sōji-ji Gardens 総持寺庭園; Sōjiji teien | Nagahama | | | 35°23′05″N 136°17′25″E | | |
| Fukujū-ji Gardens 福壽寺庭園; Fukujūji teien | Ōmihachiman | | | 35°06′11″N 136°07′23″E | | |
| Myōkan-ji Gardens 妙感寺庭園; Myōkanji teien | Ōmihachiman | | | 35°06′05″N 136°07′20″E | | |
| Anyō-ji Gardens 安養寺庭園; Anyōji teien | Rittō | | | 35°01′09″N 135°59′50″E | | |
| Former Wachūsan Honpo Gardens 旧和中散本舗庭園 kyū-Wachūsan honpo teien | Rittō | | | 35°01′28″N 136°01′07″E | | |
| Ajiki Jinja Gardens 阿自岐神社庭園; Ajiki Jinja teien | Toyosato | | | 35°12′43″N 136°13′40″E | | |
| Tokugen-in Gardens 徳源院庭園; Tokugen-in teien | Maibara | | | 35°20′43″N 136°23′17″E | | |
| Raishō-ji Gardens 来照寺庭園; Raishōji teien | Maibara | | | 35°20′38″N 136°17′59″E | | |
| Kohō-an Gardens 孤蓬庵庭園; Kohō-an teien | Nagahama | | | 35°27′16″N 136°18′50″E | | |
| Ike Family Gardens 池氏庭園; Ike-shi teien | Nagahama | | | 35°25′02″N 136°20′00″E | | |
| Satoru-in Gardens 理覚院庭園; Satoru-in teien | Nagahama | | | 35°29′04″N 136°13′51″E | | |
| Gokuraku-ji Gardens 極楽寺庭園; Gokurakuji teien | Takashima | | | 35°25′04″N 136°01′20″E | | |
| Arikawa Family Gardens 有川氏庭園; Arikawa-shi teien | Hikone | | | 35°17′14″N 136°17′04″E | | |
| Sugihara Family Gardens 杉原氏庭園; Sugihara-shi teien | Ōmihachiman | | | | | |

== Municipal Places of Scenic Beauty ==
As of 1 May 2020, a further seventeen Places have been designated at a municipal level.

== Registered Places of Scenic Beauty ==
As of 1 July 2021, three Monuments have been registered (as opposed to designated) as Places of Scenic Beauty at a national level.

| Site | Municipality | Comments | Image | Coordinates | Type | Ref. |
|---|---|---|---|---|---|---|
| Eight Views of Ōmi (Wild Geese Returning Home at Katata) 近江八景 (堅田落雁); Ōmi hakkei (Katata rakugan) | Ōtsu | | | 35°06′35″N 135°55′18″E | | |
| Eight Views of Ōmi (Evening Bell at Mii-dera) 近江八景 (三井晩鐘); Ōmi hakkei (Mii no banshō) | Ōtsu | | | 35°06′36″N 135°55′18″E | | |
| Shōjukan Gardens 松樹館庭園; Shōjukan teien | Higashiōmi | | | | | |

== See also ==
- Cultural Properties of Japan
- List of parks and gardens of Shiga Prefecture
- List of Historic Sites of Japan (Shiga)
