= Kongōrin-ji =

Buddhist temple in Shiga Prefecture, Japan

- Important Cultural Property
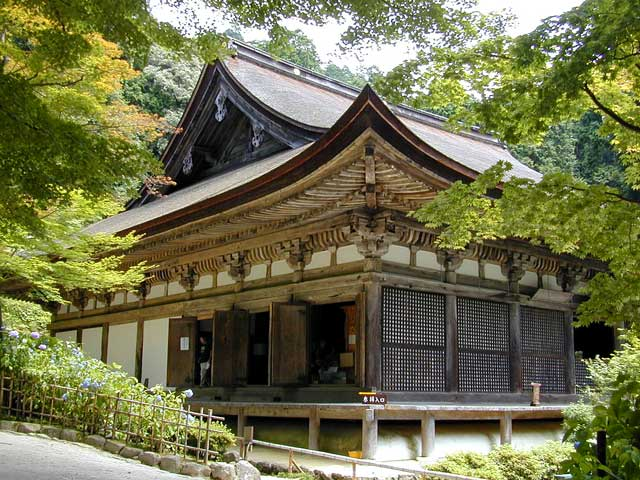
- Hondō of Kongōrin-ji

- Location within Shiga Prefecture Location within Japan

Religion
- Affiliation: Buddhism
- Sect: Tendai
- Prefecture: Shiga
- Region: Kansai
- Deity: Kannon Bosatsu

Location
- Municipality: Aishō
- Country: Japan
- Prefecture: Shiga
- Coordinates: 35°9′40.5″N 136°16′59″E

Architecture
- Founder: c. Gyōki
- Established: c. 737 or 741

Website
- Official website

Kongōrin-ji (金剛輪寺), also known as Matsuo-dera (松尾寺) (from its location) is a Buddhist temple of the Tendai sect located in the town of Aishō, Shiga Prefecture, Japan. The honzon of the temple is Kannon Bosatsu. The temple was founded in the early Heian period and together with Saimyō-ji in Kōra and Hyakusai-ji in Higashiōmi the temple forms a group of three temples known as Kotō-sanzan (湖東三山; lit. '"three mountains east of the lake"'). The complex includes a Main Hall that is designated as National Treasures, which contains many statues from the Heian period onwards which are Important Cultural Properties and a garden designated as National Place of Scenic Beauty.

== History ==
The foundation of Kongōrin-ji is not certain. According to the temple's legend, it was founded by Gyōki at the request of Emperor Shōmu in 737 or 741 AD, but there is no documentary evidence to corroborate this. The area in which the temple was built was under the control of the powerful Hata clan, an immigrant clan active in Japan since the Kofun period, and the clan was in no doubt connected with the establishment of the temple. The temple was revived by Ennin and brought into the Tendai sect during the Kajō era (848–851) of the early Heian period. The subsequent history of the temple is not clear, but many Buddhist statues from the late Heian period to the Kamakura period. remain in the temple. During the Kamakura period, it became a center for ecumenical studies combining the Tendai and the Shingon traditions. The current Hondō was constructed by Sasaki Yoritsuna, the shugō of Ōmi Province, to commemorate the victory over the Mongol invasions of Japan. In the Sengoku period, the temple was damaged by Oda Nobunaga during his attempt to destroy the power of the warrior monks of the Tendai sect at Mount Hiei and other strongholds. However, as the Main Hall and central complex of the temple was several hundred meters from its main gate, most of the temple escaped destruction. During the Edo period, the temple went into slow decline. During the Bakumatsu period, on January 8, 1868, Saigo Takamori of the Satsuma Domain and the kuge Iwakura Tomomi met at this temple to form the Sekihotai militia towards the overthrow of the Tokugawa shogunate.

== Precincts ==
=== Main Hall ===
The temple's Hondō is designated a National Treasure. It is a 7 x 7 bay structure with a roof made of cypress bark. The metal fittings on the altar are inscribed with the date of 1288, which corresponds to historical documentation that it had been erected to commemorate the victory over the Mongol invasions of Japan; however, during investigations conducted in 1988 when the roof was repaired, it was found that this structure was built during the Namboku-chō period, and that the metal fittings were reused from the previous structure. The inner chapel which houses the temple's honzon is a structure with a irimoya-style roof, also with cypress bark, and which is contemporary with the main building. The honzon itself is a hibutsu statue of Kannon Bosatsu, called the "Namami Kannon", which is attributed to Gyōki. It is so roughly carved as to appear unfinished, but it belongs to a genre known as "hatchet statuary" from the latter half of the Heian period.

The Hondō houses a number of statues which have been designated as Important Cultural Properties:

- Amida Nyorai, seated, early Kamakura period, 141.2-cm, wooden, dated 1222
- Amida Nyorai, seated, late Heian period, 140.0 cm, wooden
- Juichimen Kannon, standing, late Heian period, 172.4 cm, wooden
- Fudo-Myoo, standing, wooden, dated 1211
- Bishmon-ten, standing, wooden, dated 1211
- Shi-Tenno, standing, wooden, dated 1212
- Ennin, seated, wooden, dated 1286, (now located at Tokyo National Museum)
- Ennin, seated, Heian period, 84.0-cm, wooden, dated 1288
- Shō Kannon, seated, Kamakura Period, 106.5 cm, dated 1269 (now located at Museum of Fine Arts, Boston)

=== Three-story Pagoda ===
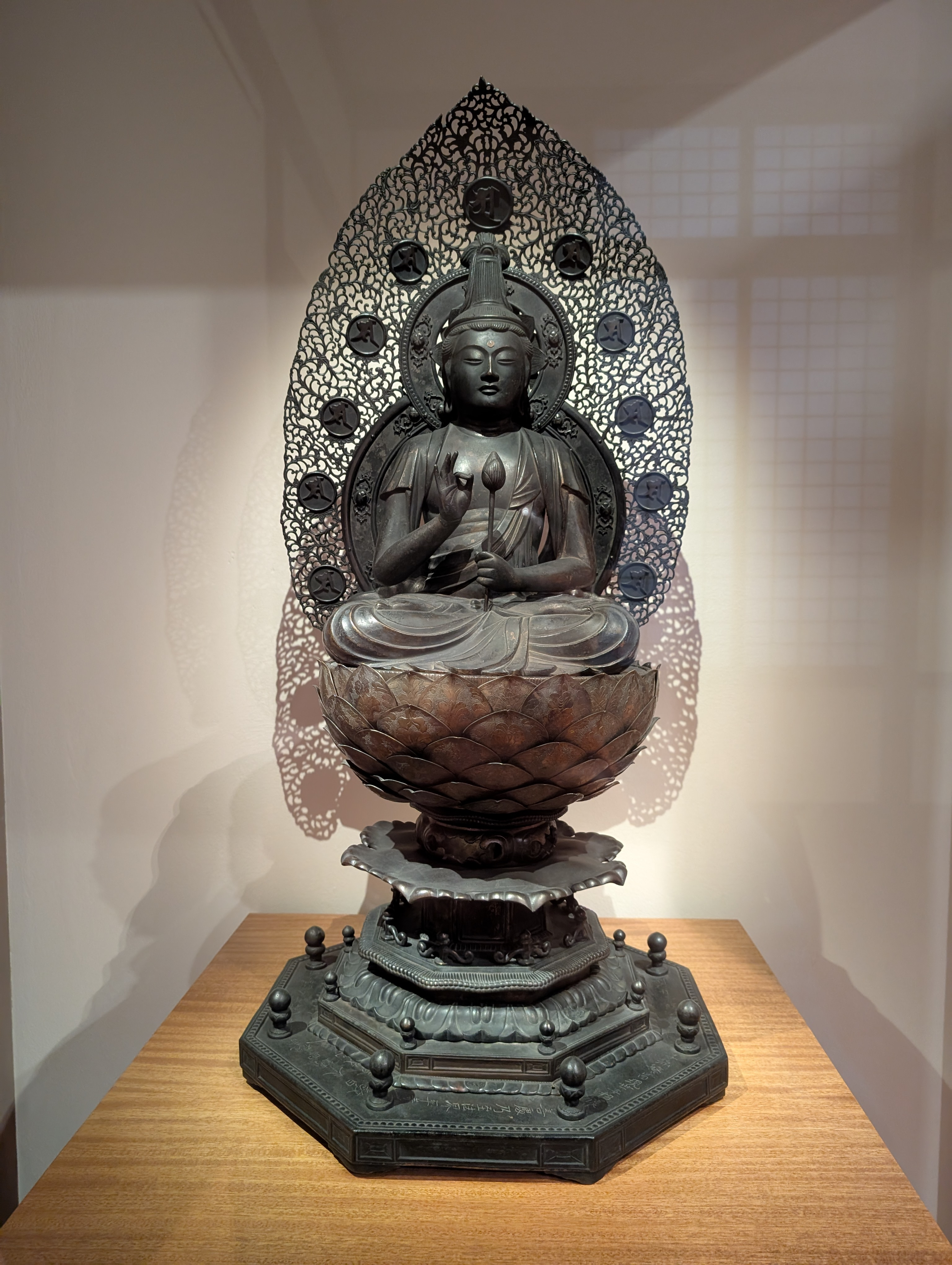
Seated Shō Kannon (1269), MFA Boston, left the temple during the Meiji era

The temple's pagoda is located to the north, and one level higher, than the Hondō. According to the temple, it was built in 1246; however, stylistically it dates from the Namboku-chō period. The pagoda deteriorated severely in the Meiji period and was allowed to fall into ruin; it was repaired and restored from 1975 to 1978, using a similar pagoda at Saimyō-ji in neighboring Kōra as reference. The pagoda has been designated a National Important Cultural Property.

=== Niten-mon ===
The temple's main gate was built in the early Muromachi period. It was originally a Rōmon, or two-story tower gate, but as with the three-story pagoda, it was allowed to fall into ruin, and the upper story was lost. It was restored in the Edo period. This structure is also designated as an Important Cultural Property.

=== Myōjū-in Gardens ===
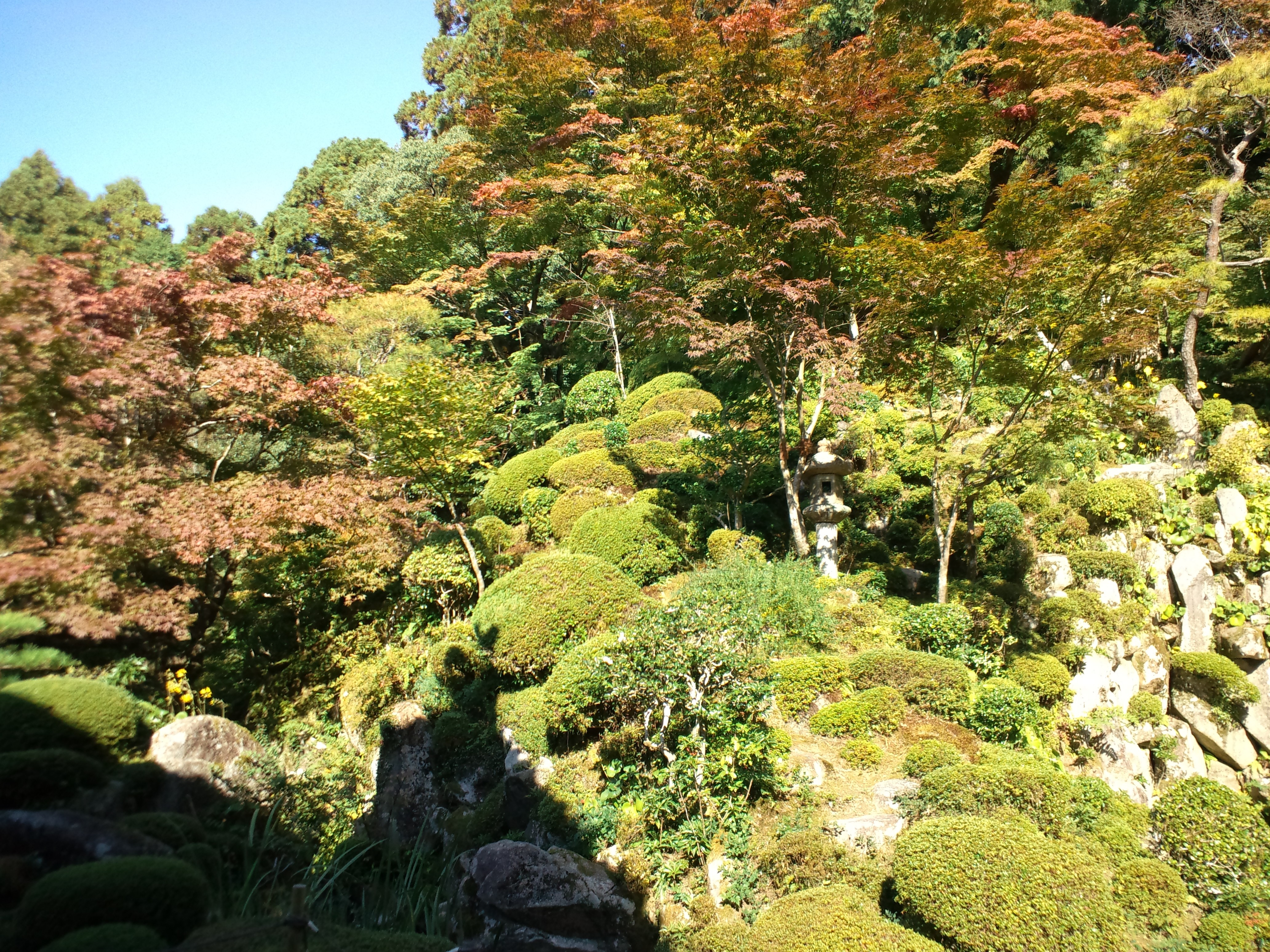
Myōjū-in Gardens

The Myōjū-in (明寿院) was a subsidiary chapel of Kongōrin-ji. It was destroyed in a fire in 1977, but has subsequently been rebuilt. The chapel is noteworthy for its gardens Myōjū-in Teiin (明寿院庭園) which are a National Place of Scenic Beauty The gardens date from the Momoyama period and consists of three separate gardens. The first is from the Momoyama period, with a stone bridge in the center and a Kamakura period hōkyōintō. The second garden is from the early Edo period and has many stones, and the third is from the middle Edo period and has a pond with a stone in the middle representing a ship.

== See also ==
- List of National Treasures of Japan (temples)
- List of Places of Scenic Beauty of Japan (Shiga)
- Buddhist temples in Japan
