= 柏原駅 =

柏原駅 may refer to:

- Kaibara Station
- Kashiwabara Station
- Kashiwara Station
