= Seated Shō Kannon =

1269 statue of Avalokitesvara in MFA Boston

Shō Kannon, the Bodhisattva of Compassion
- Shō Kannon bosatsu zazō (聖観音菩薩坐像 一躯) (Japanese)
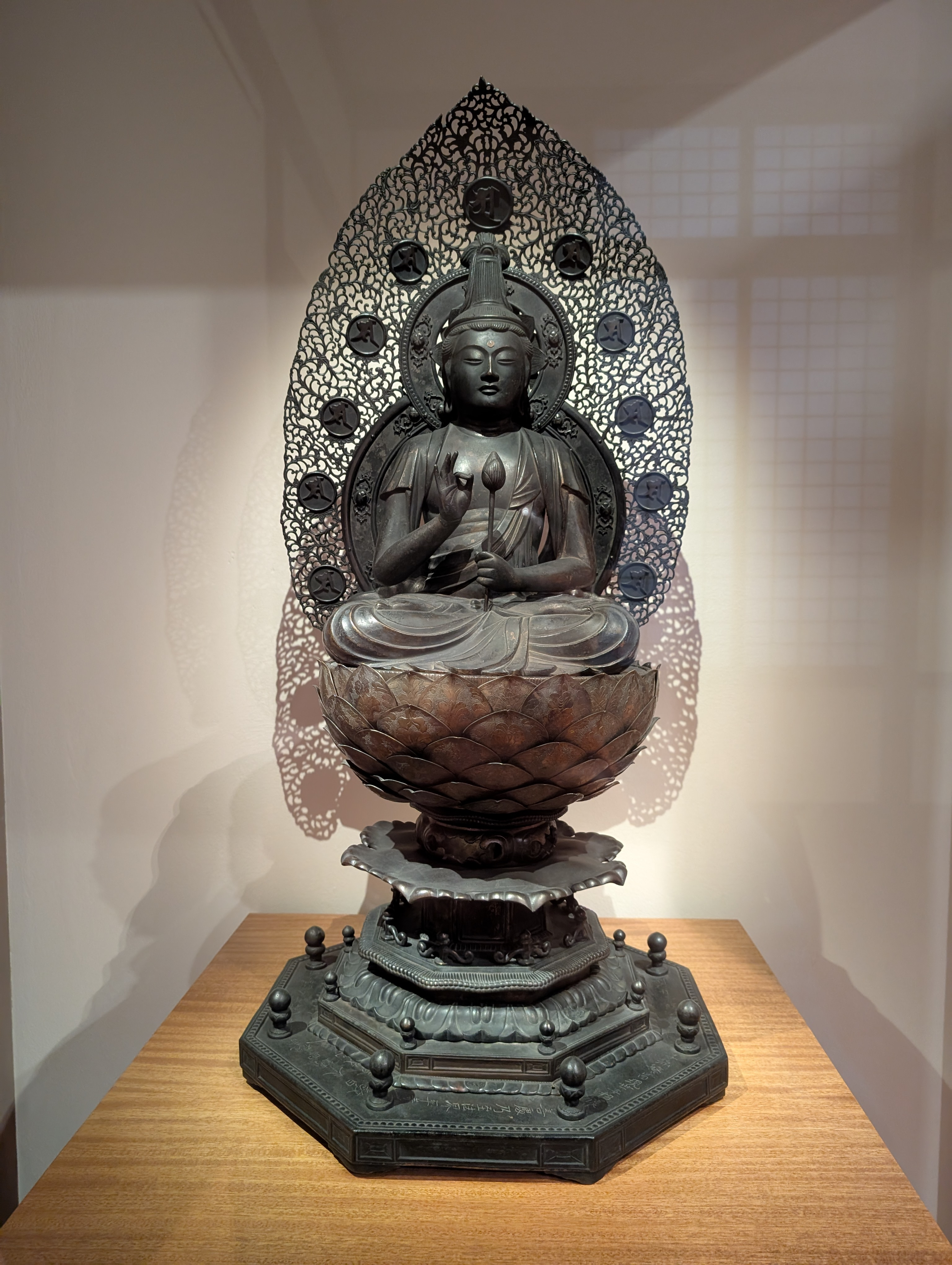
- The bodhisattva on display, MFA Boston, March 2025
- Artist: Saichi
- Year: 1269
- Catalogue: Kajima MFA no. 38
- Medium: gilt bronze
- Movement: Japanese Buddhist Art
- Subject: Avalokiteśvara
- Dimensions: 106.5 cm (41.9 in); Height of figure: 50.3 cm Height of figure to hairline: 38.2 cm
- Location: Museum of Fine Arts, Boston, Boston
- Accession: 11.11447.1-3
- Website: https://collections.mfa.org/objects/11288/sho-kannon-the-bodhisattva-of-compassion?ctx=0a0deeb1-d8ee-444c-9729-6e765cb2fe22&idx=5

Seated Shō Kannon, (Japanese: 聖観音菩薩坐像 一躯, Romaji: Shōkan'non bosatsuzazō ichi mukuro), is a gilt bronze Japanese Buddhist sculpture depicting Avalokiteśvara (Shō Kannon). Part of a wave of construction at Kongōrin-ji in Aishō, Shiga during the Kamakura period in 1269, it ultimately left the temple during the Meiji Restoration during the dismantling of old Buddhist institutions thru shinbutsu bunri. Part of the collection of William Sturgis Bigelow, it was given to the Museum of Fine Arts, Boston, which serves as the nucleus of its Japanese art collection.

== Provenance ==
Kongōrin-ji in Aishō, Shiga has a large following amongst Kannon worshipers in Japan since its inception in 741 by the monk Gyōki, thanks to its principal image. At its height during the Kamakura period, the monastery had over 100 buildings, during with the bulk of these sculptures and its main hall survive. In 7 December 1269 (Bun'ei 6), the sculptor Saichi (西智) was commissioned by the Korean-descent Hata clan (Echi branch) member Inugami Rikichi (犬上利吉) to sculpt the image of Shō Kannon, which was inscribed on the bottom:

敬白。奉鑄聖觀音 　像一躰幷不動毘沙門。 　近江国依智郡之内 　松尾寺本堂奉安置 　之。右志者為願主犬上 　利吉幷芳縁依智秦氏。 　子孫繁昌現世安穏。後生 　善處。乃至法界平等 　利益故也。[4]

"Respectfully presented, dedicated to the casting of one statue of Shō Kannon, Fudo Myoo, and Bishamonten; Enshrined in the main hall of Matsuo-ji, in Echi District, Ōmi Province. The above is done for the benefit of Inugami Rikichi of the Echi Hata clan. May your descendants prosper, and live in peace in this life, May they be reborn in a good place. And may all beings in the Dharma enjoy equal benefit."

In 1274, the temple saw immense activity and activity for prayer during the Mongol invasions of Japan. Centuries later, when Oda Nobunaga waged a campaign against Enryaku-ji, the temple was attacked in 1573. The sculpture also survived with the temple's main hall, pagoda, and Nitenmon (housing the Nio), thanks to the quick thing of the priest at the time.

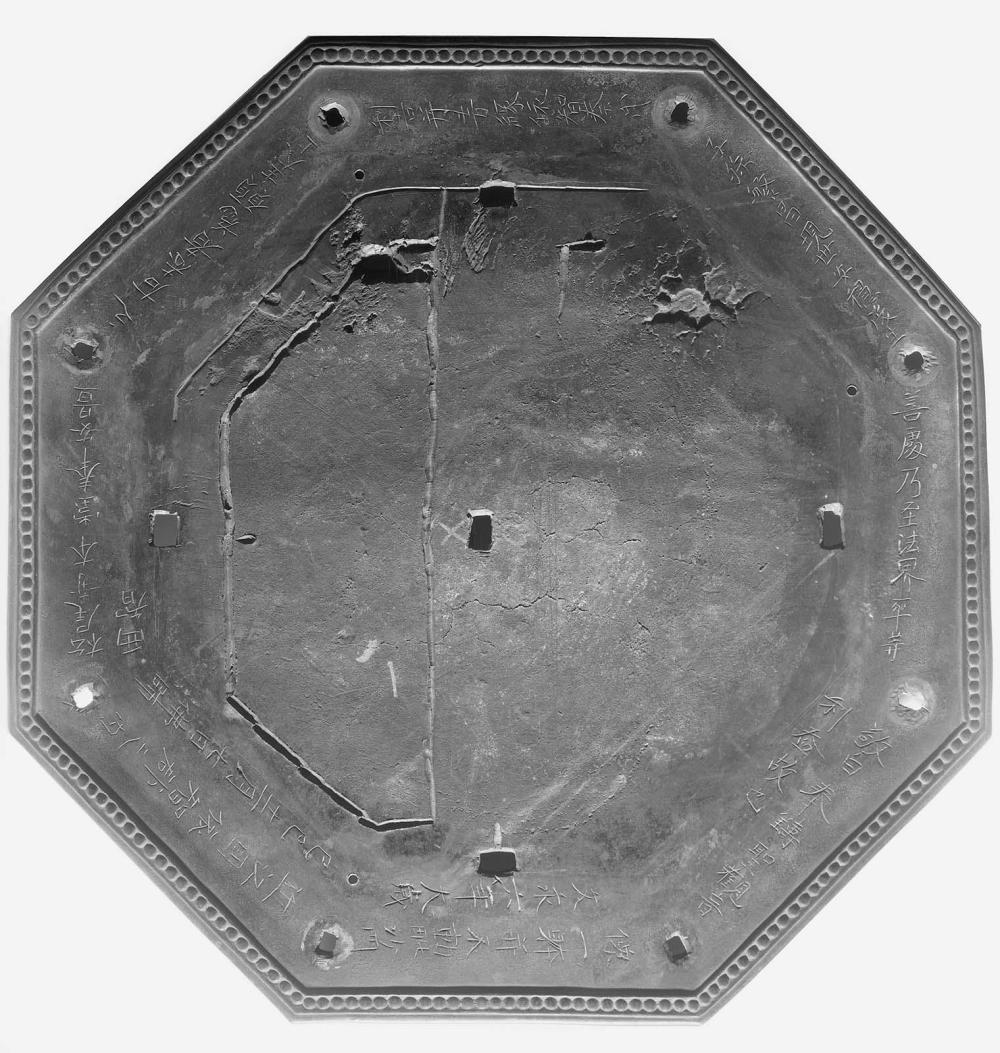
Base with inscription

During the Meiji Restoration, the policy separating Shintoism from Buddhism, in the form of shinbutsu bunri caused the separation of the Shō Kannon from the temple, where it landed under the ownership of William Sturgis Bigelow, who fostered a love for Japanese art along with Ernest Fenollosa and Edward S. Morse (known as the "Boston triumvitate"). Bigelow's collection of 41,000 artifacts were deposited into the Museum of Fine Arts, Boston where it was officially acquired on 3 August 1911 under accession number 11.11447.1-3.

In Aishō's Museum of History and Culture, a replica of the statue was made with permission from the MFA, using photographs of the original. It is referred to as the "Boston Buddha" by locals.

== Description ==
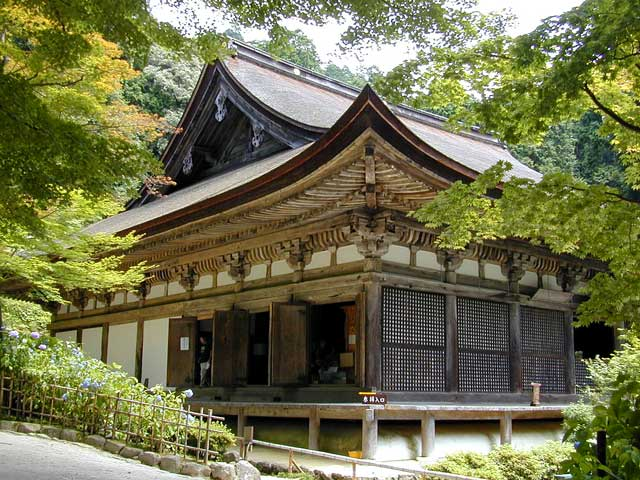
Kongōrin-ji, Hondō, which once held the statue

The Shō Kannon is a sculpture with a total height of 106.5 cm (with the figure itself being 50.3 cm, and the height to hairline measuring 38.2 cm). It is sculpted out of bronze that was once gilt, but the gilding wore off and the surface was darkened due to centuries of usage and soot from incense. It is assembled with multiple parts, consisting with the head, torso, and legs cast from a single mold, the arms cast separately, and connected with dovetail joints at the shoulder. The octagonal base (made of gilded copper) has the signature of its sculptor (Saichi) and the dedicatory description. The double halo and arabesque mandorla has Sanskrit seed syllables, ten for Kannon, one above the head for Vairocana. Cumulatively, including the lotus petals at the base, cast separately and attached to a wooden frame, the cumulative number of pins, tenons, and joinery amount to more than a hundred components.

The statue maintains a benevolent expression, and holds a lotus in his hands and with his right fingers giving a gesture of argumentation.

Overall, it is considered by the MFA to be the finest bronze sculpture of 13th-century Japan.

== See Also ==
- Boston Miroku - another statue in the exhibit, once held by Kōfuku-ji
