= Saimyō-ji (Kora) =

Buddhist temple in Kōra, Shiga Prefecture, Japan

- 西明寺
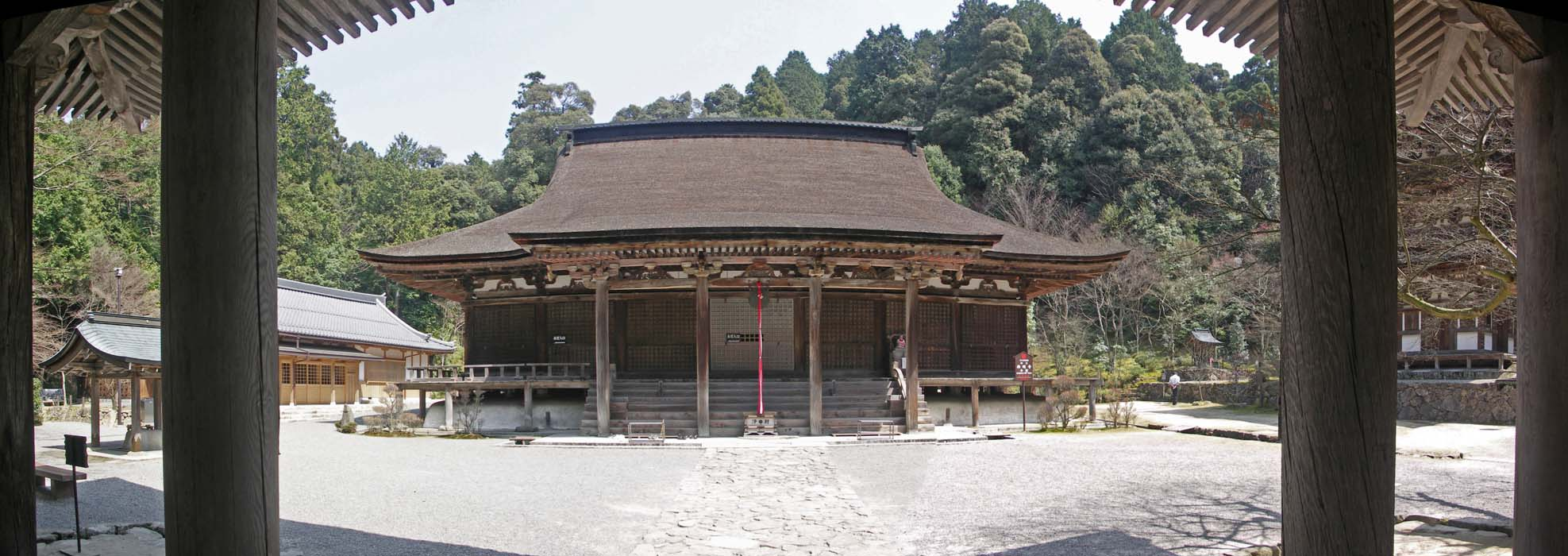
- Hondō of Saimyō-ji

- Location within Shiga Prefecture Location within Japan

Religion
- Affiliation: Buddhism
- Sect: Tendai
- Prefecture: Shiga
- Region: Kansai
- Deity: Yakushi Nyōrai

Location
- Municipality: Kōra
- Country: Japan
- Interactive map of Saimyō-ji
- Prefecture: Shiga
- Coordinates: 35°11′2.3″N 136°17′3.4″E

Architecture
- Founder: c. Sanshū
- Established: c. 834

Website
- Official website

Saimyō-ji (西明寺), also known as Kotō-sanzan Saimyōji (湖東三山西明寺) or as Ryūōzan Saimyōji (龍應山西明寺) is a Buddhist temple of the Tendai sect located in the town of Kōra, Shiga Prefecture, Japan. The honzon of the temple is Yakushi Nyōrai, the Buddha of healing. The temple was founded in the early Heian period and together with Kongōrin-ji in Aishō and Hyakusai-ji in Higashiōmi the temple forms a group of three temples known as Kotō-sanzan (湖東三山; lit. "three mountains east of the lake"). The complex includes several National Treasures and a garden designated as National Place of Scenic Beauty.

== History ==
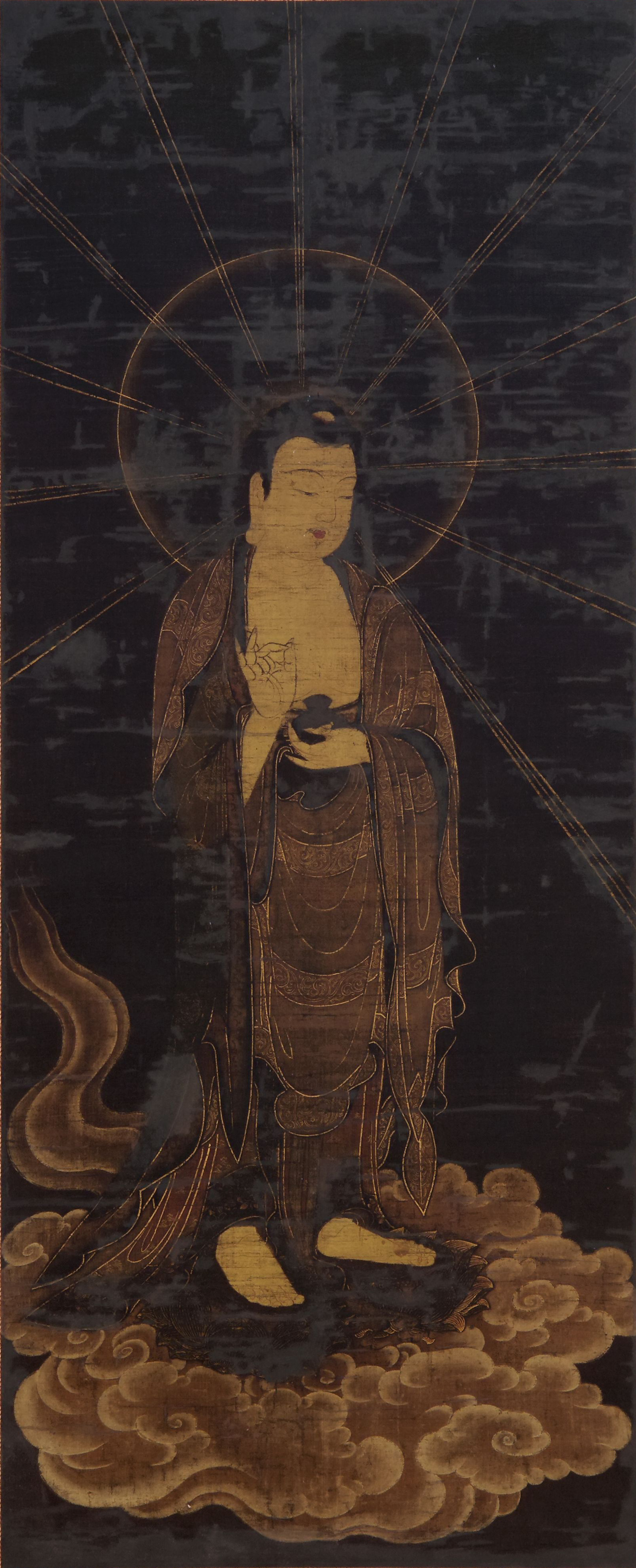
Yakushi Nyōrai, the Buddha of healing and medicine, venerated at Saimyō-ji.

The foundations of Saimyō-ji are uncertain. According to the temple's legend, in the year 834, the monk Sanshū, while on a meditative walk along the western shore of Lake Biwa, saw purple clouds (Note: Purple clouds (紫雲, Shiun) are a good omen in Mahayana Buddhist mythology) in the eastern sky across the lake. A dazzling light suddenly appeared. The monk, interpreting this phenomenon as a sign of celestial power, crossed the lake and found a pond from which the light emitted. In response to his prayers, he had a vision of Nikkō Bosatsu, Gakkō Bosatsu, Yakushi Nyōrai, and the Twelve Heavenly Generals. Hearing of this miraculous event, Emperor Ninmyō ordered a temple to be built at this location, and as this miracle illuminated the heavens to the west of the imperial capital, the temple was named Saimyō-ji (西明寺; lit. the temple of the luminous West).

In accordance with a belief within Chinese geomancy, the site of the temple near Lake Biwa to the east of the imperial capital, Heian-kyō, corresponded to a centre of cosmic influences in feng shui. The temple was therefore functioned as the Azure Dragon, guardian of the East and one of the Four Symbols. The temple's honorific mountain name, Ryūōzan (龍應山; lit. "mountain of the responding dragon"), was meant to signify that every wish was fulfilled at Saimyō-ji.

Although the date of 834 AD and the connection to Emperor Ninmyō, the fifty-fourth emperor of Japan are given in the temple's official home page, there is no historical documentation to corroborate this date. However, when the existing main hall and three-story pagoda were reconstructed in the Kamakura period, the temple was of considerable size. At the beginning of the Kamakura shogunate (1192 - 1333), Minamoto no Yoritomo, the first Shōgun of the Kamakura period (1185 - 1333), paid an official visit to the temple. During the Kamakura period, the temple had 17 major structures with some 300 priests in residence, and territory with a kokudaka of 2000 koku.

In 1571, during the Sengoku period, in the Siege of Mount Hiei, Oda Nobunaga, decided to challenge the power of the warrior monks of the Tendai sect, and destroyed the sect's headquarters at Enryaku-ji as well as other Tendai centers in Ōmi Province He dispatched his general Niwa Nagahide, to destroy Saimyō-ji as well. Due to a ruse whereby a large amount of dry wood was set on fire near the main gate of the temple, the attackers were fooled into thinking that the entire temple was in flames, and the temple's main hall and the three-story pagoda were able to survive.

During the Edo period, the Saimyō-ji was in a much-reduced state. Thanks to the interventions of the monks Tenkai and Kōkai), the daimyō of Mochizuki Domain, and Shogun Tokugawa Iemitsu, the temple was gradually rebuilt, recovering its status as a major center of Buddhist studies.

On 28 December 1897, six months after the promulgation of the Ancient Temples and Shrines Preservation Law, (Note: Ancient Temples and Shrines Preservation Law (古社寺保存法, koshaji hozonhō)) the Hondō of Saimyō-ji was designated a National Treasure, a classification confirmed in 1952 under the new Law for the Protection of Cultural Properties (文化財保護法, bunkazai hogohō) promulgated on 30 May 1950 by the Ministry of Education.

As part of state heritage conservation programme, repairs of several listed buildings were carried out during the 2000s.

In 2020, an infrared survey revealed that four Bodhisattva statues were drawn on the west and south pillars in front of the Yakushi Nyōrai statue in the Main Hall. The paintings were drawn during the Asuka period and are among the oldest Buddhist paintings in Japan. Due to the existence of this Hashira-e, the origins of the temple may be older than the tradition indicates.

== Precincts ==
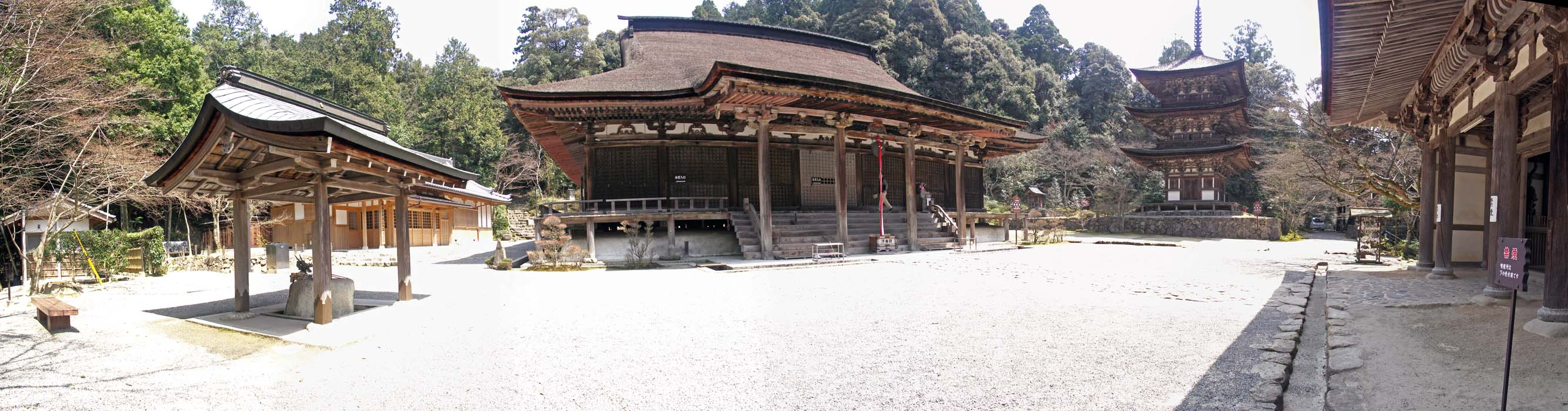
View of the temple compound

Saimyō-ji is located about 11 km (6.8 mi) east of Lake Biwa, on a wooded hillside at the foot of the northwestern slope of the Suzuka Mountains. The precincts are divided by the Meishin Expressway.

The temple is a complex that includes a main building, two gates, one of which is an entrance gate (sōmon), and the other a middle gate (nitenmon), enshrining two statues of Niō, two Japanese pagodas, one traditional shōrō (bell tower), a chōzuya (ablution pavilion), a garden of sakura, Japanese maples, cedars and cypresses, a landscaped garden (Hōraitei (庭庭)), (Note: The name of this garden is an allusion to Mount Penglai (蓬萊山, Hōraisan), a place of eternal youth and paradise of Chinese mythology.) a residence for priests, a reception desk and an information office. Wood and stone are the main building materials.

A steep path, sandō, which leads from the entrance gate to the main gate (Nitenmon) of the temple, divides the complex in two. Two onigawara, a shachihoko, and many stone vestiges, such as Buddhist sculptures, lanterns, groups of Jizō, litter the mossy soil of the grounds. At the edge of the sandō, a statue of Saichō, a Buddhist monk who founded the Tendai branch of Japanese Buddhism, recalls the religious affiliation of the temple. A hokora, miniature Shinto shrine, dedicated to the Eastern Guardian Dragon, and another honoring Inari are signs of the historical syncretism between Buddhism and Shintoism (Shinbutsu-shūgō).

A corner of the grounds houses a statue of Jūichimenkannon (十一面観音), one of the many manifestations of the Goddess of Mercy with eleven faces. This bronze Kannon sculpture is surrounded by panels supporting shelves on which are aligned hundreds of miniatures of the bodhisattva.

=== Nitenmon ===
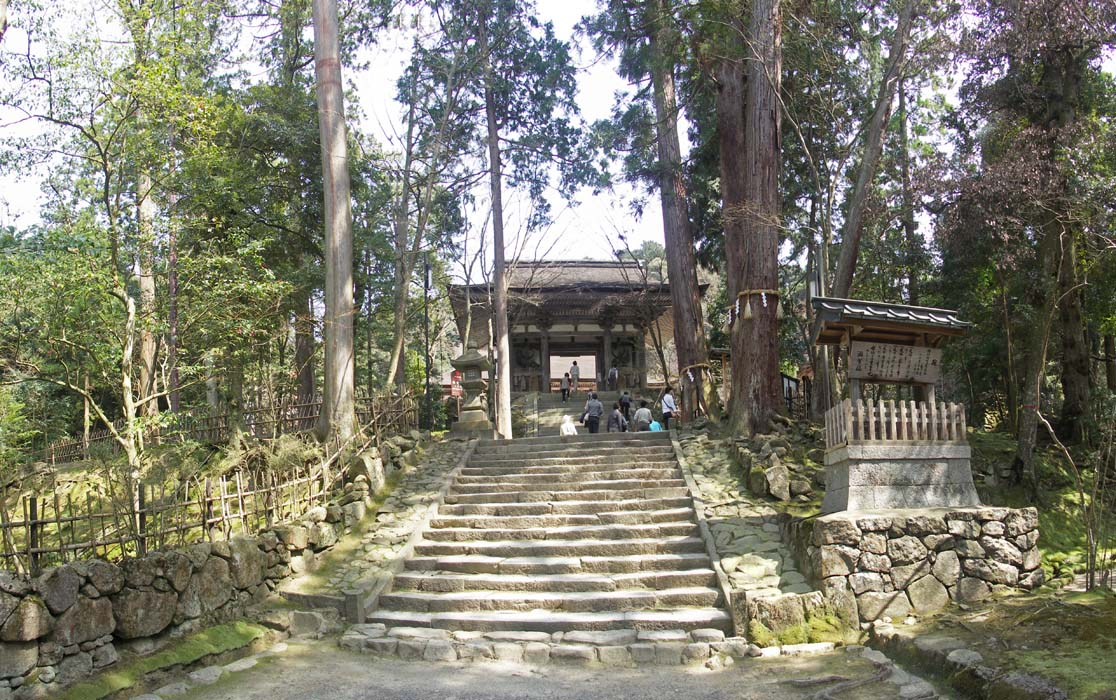
Sandō leading to the nitenmon.

A niōmon, called Nitenmon ("the gate of the two celestial kings"), marks the entrance to the temple enclosure. This Muromachi period gateway dates to 1407 and is the oldest extant Nitenmon. It enshrines on either side of its opening wooden statues of Zōjō-ten, guardian of the south and of Jikoku-ten, guardian of the east; two representatives of the Four Heavenly Kings. (Note: The prefix niten (二天) designates two of the Four Heavenly Kings.) The gate is entirely made of wood in the hakkyakumon (八脚門) style and has an irimoya-style roof.

In 1911, the Saimyō-ji Nitenmon was designated as an Important Cultural Property.

=== Main hall ===
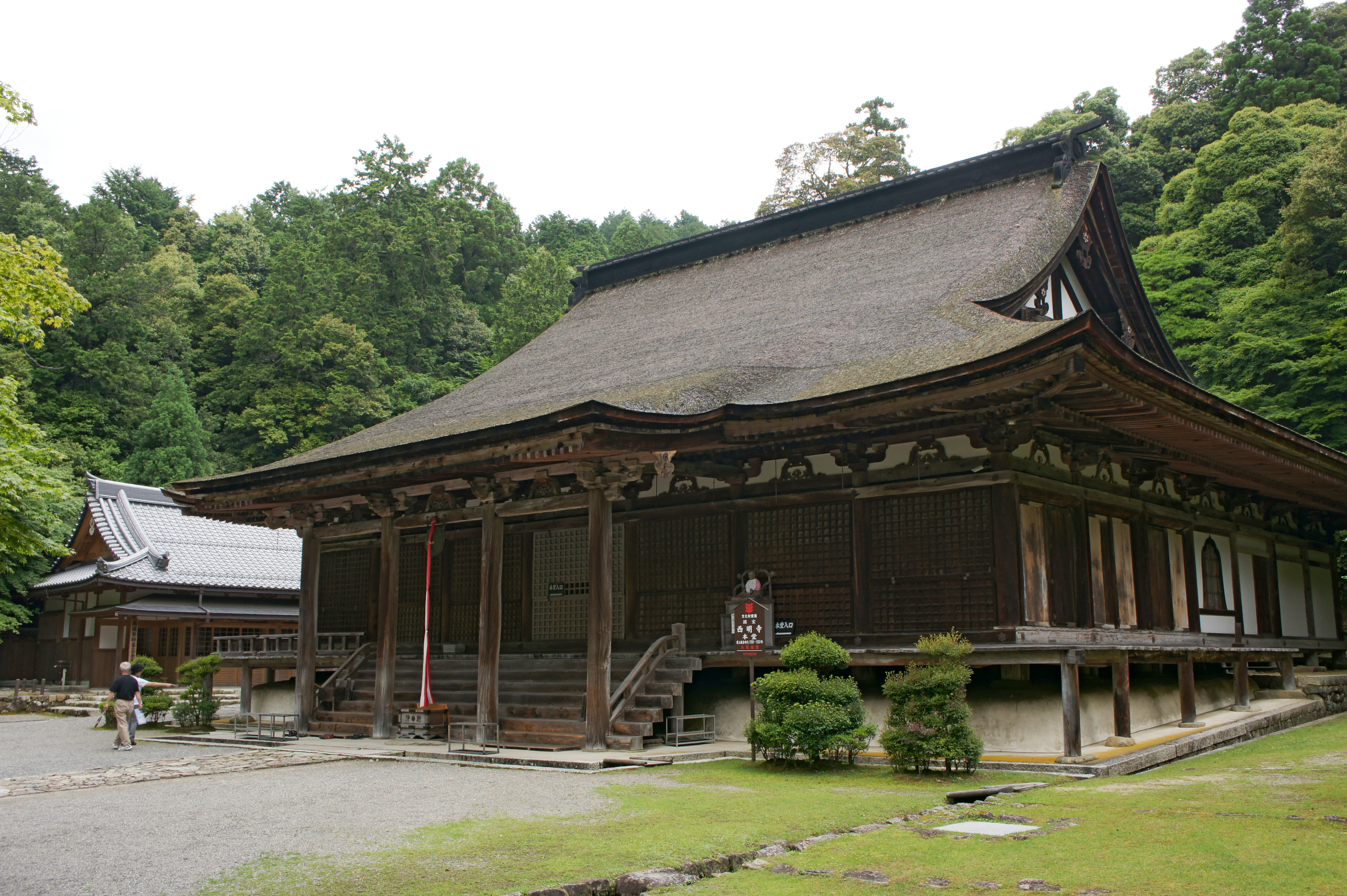
Hondō du temple Saimyō.

Dating to the end of the Kamakura period, the temple's main hall (本堂, Hondō), also known as ruriden and designated as a National Treasure, is a hinoki cypress wood construction without any nails. It is a 7×7 ken single-storied, irimoya-style construction with a 3 ken step canopy. The roof is covered with bark shingles. The building serves as a place of meditation for the faithful of the Tendai school.

The building, with an area of approximately 160 m^{2} (1,700 sq ft), houses Kamakura-period wooden sculptures of the Twelve Heavenly Generals, three statues forming the Pure Land Triad: Amida Nyōrai surrounded by Kannon Bosatsu and Seishi Bosatsu, two gilded statuettes representing Nikkō Bosatsu and Gakkō Bosatsu, terracotta miniatures of the monks Ryōgen and Shinran from the Muromachi period, and several important national cultural objects: an icon of Yakushi Nyōrai from the Heian period, statues of Shaka Nyōrai (Kamakura period), Fudō Myōō, works of the monk Enchin dating from the beginning of the Heian era, Kōmoku-ten and Tamon-ten (Heian period), two of the Four Heavenly Kings of Buddhist mythology.

Saimyō-ji is the 32nd stop on a pilgrimage route installed in 1989 in the Kansai region connecting 49 holy sites dedicated to Yakushi Nyōrai. (Note: 西国薬師四十九霊場 (Saigoku Yakushi shijūku reijō)) The first is Yakushi-ji in Nara and the last Enryaku-ji in Kyoto. A building near to the main hall is set up to receive the pilgrims and the temple provides each with a certificate stamped with the official seal attesting their passage.

=== Hōtō ===
Behind the main building of the temple, a wooden staircase leads to a clearing. In this isolated place, a Kamakura period Tahōtō (宝塔) or pagoda made of granite. This Important Cultural Property from 1304 is a monument commemorating the founding of Saimyō-ji.

=== Three-story pagoda ===
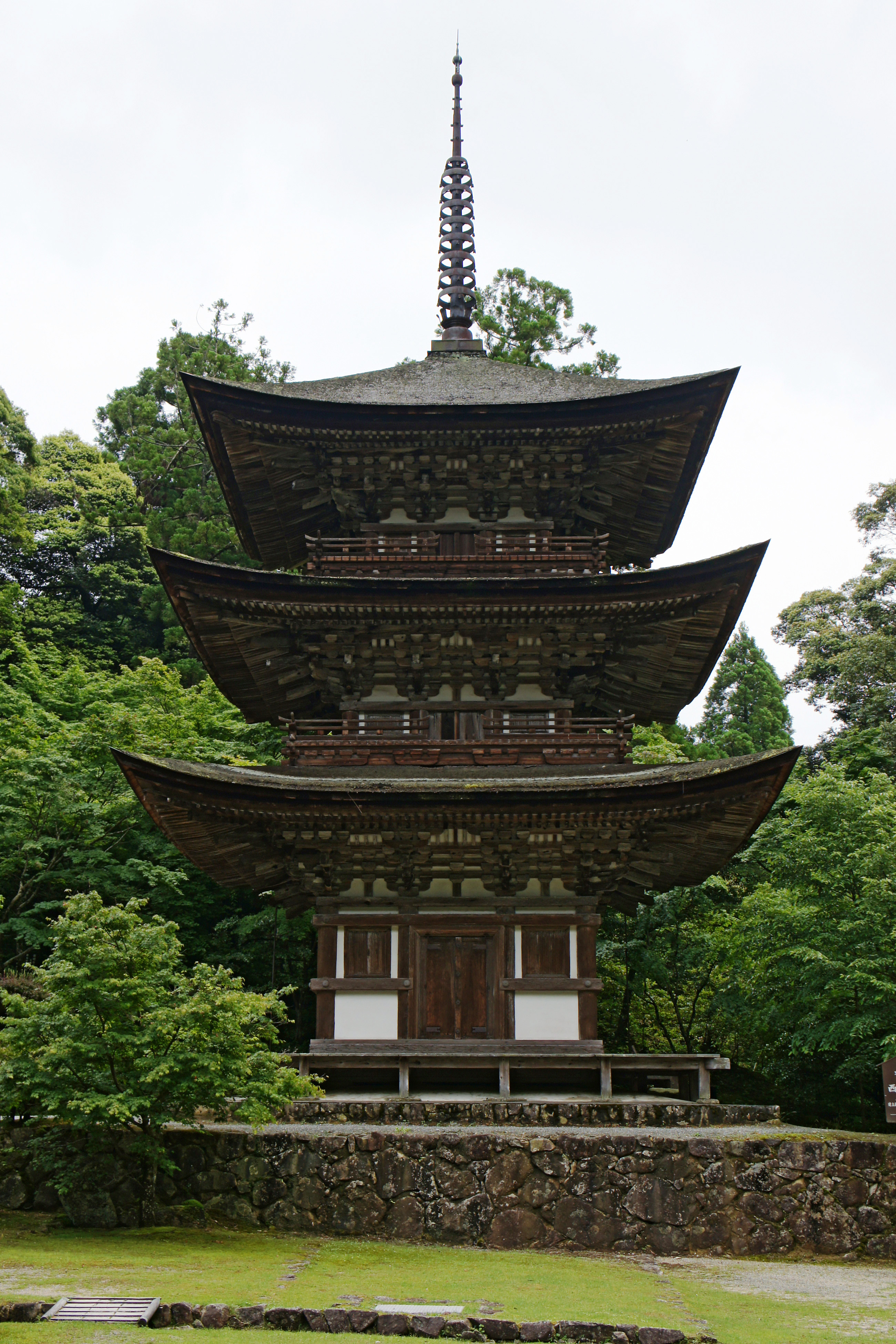
Three-storied pagoda

The Saimyō-ji complex contains a 24 m (79 ft) tall, 3×3 ken three-story pagoda (三重塔, sanjūnotō) in Japanese style. The carpenters from the Hida region who built it towards the end of the Kamakura period used only Japanese hinoki cypress wood and no nails.

On the first floor of the building, murals by painters of the Kose school (Note: Kose School (巨勢派, Koseha), school of painters founded by Kose Kanaoka in the 9th century.) illustrate the Lotus Sutra, which is at the base of the religious corpus of the Tendai branch of Japanese Buddhism, and Dainichi Nyorai and his 32 attendants. They are the only extant Kamakura period murals.

This monument, typical of the architectural style of the Kamakura period, has been classified as a National Treasure since 1952.

== Honbō Garden ==
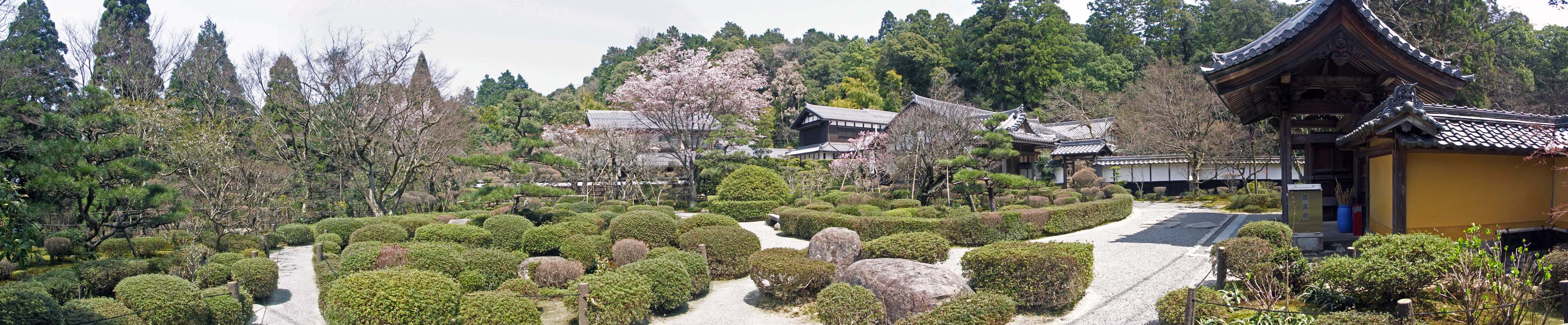
Honbō garden

Beyond the gate of the temple, lies a wooded garden, on the ground covered with moss. Known as Honbō Garden (本坊庭園, Honbō-teien), it contains sugi, hinoki cypress, and a large number of Japanese maple trees. Spring blossoms in the garden include pink and white flowers of Yoshino cherry trees, mountain cherry (yamazakura), spring cherry (higanzakura), white bell-shaped flowers of Enkianthus perulatus, flower beds of Rhododendron and hydrangea.

From the beginning of September until November, the garden is a popular spot for autumn hanami, when the toad lilies, camellias, Japanese maple and fudan zakura (不断桜), a late blooming cultivation of a Japanese ornamental cherry tree, give the full measure of their flowering. Some of these ornamental cherry trees were planted in the mid-eighteenth century.

Near the Nitenmon, two Japanese cedars (Cryptomeria japonica), joined at the base of their trunks, form a pair of siamese trees. A shimenawa surrounding them emphasizes the sacredness of this "married couple" (夫婦). Associated with the much younger cedar that grows to a few centimeters from their contiguous trunks, they symbolize a family to which a local belief attributes miraculous properties: it would be enough to put hands on their roots or trunk to ensure good health, longevity, a harmonious couple life, family prosperity or even a painless childbirth.

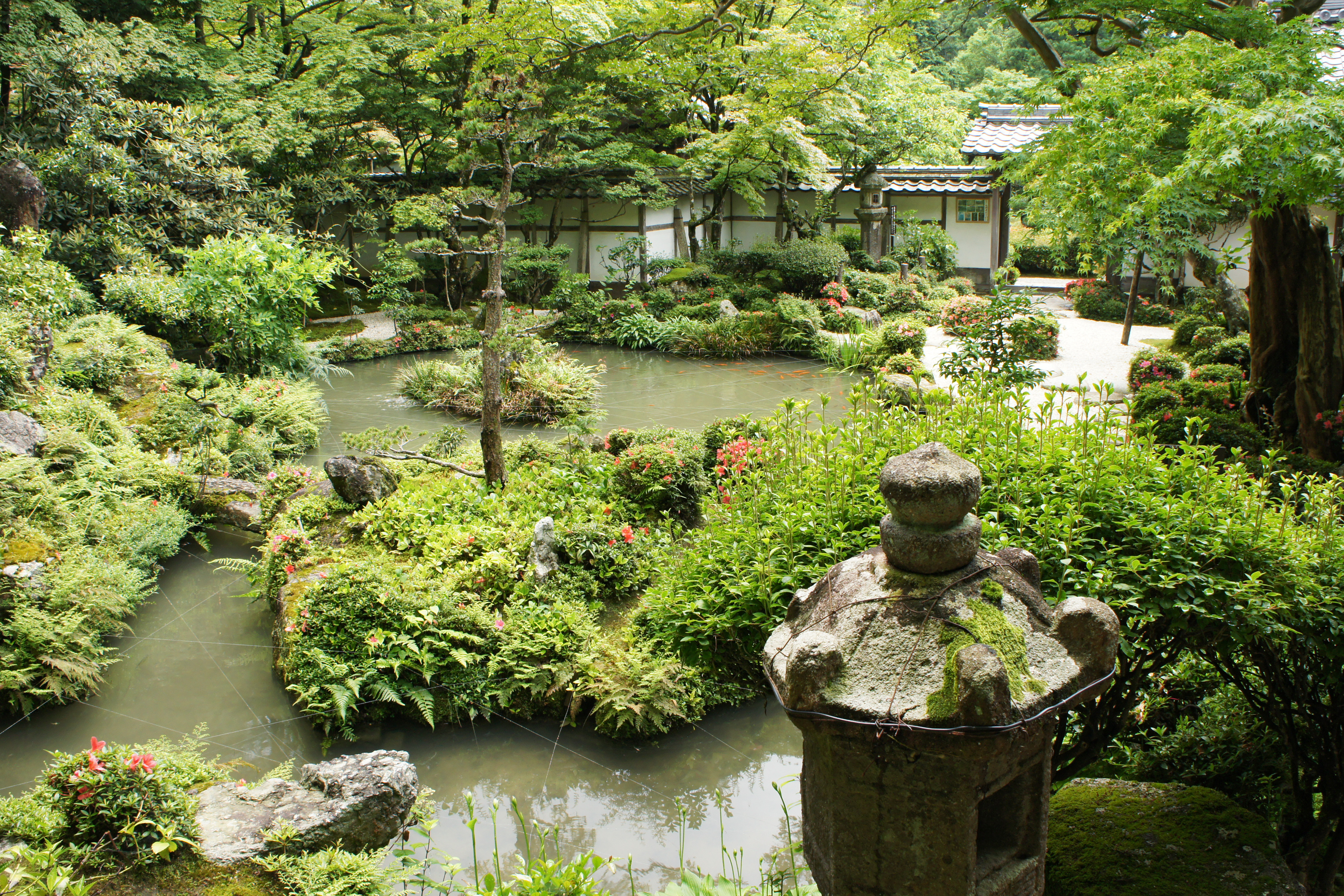
Hōrai Garden

The garden, which has been listed as a Place of Scenic Beauty of Japan since 1987, includes a landscaped garden known as Hōrai Garden (庭庭, Hōraitei), a donation by the daimyō of Mochizuki Domain to celebrate the reconstruction of the temple in 1673. With its stones representing the triad of the Pure Land, Nikkō and Gakkō Bosatsu, and the Twelve Heavenly Generals, this expanse of greenery constitutes an allegory of Mount Penglai of Chinese mythology. Among the plants on an island in its koi pond, emerge stones whose shapes resemble a tortoise or a paper crane, traditional figures of the Japanese art of folding paper.

== See also ==
=== External links ===
- Official website (ja)
- 滋賀県甲良町 西明寺 [Kōra, Shiga prefecture : Saimyō-ji] (in Japanese). Japan Geographic. 2016. "Collection of color photographs of Saimyō-ji".
- HealingJapanTV - 滋賀県 湖東三山 西明寺の紅葉 (sounds of nature) on YouTube.

=== See also ===
- List of National Treasures of Japan (temples)
- List of Places of Scenic Beauty of Japan (Shiga)
- Buddhist temples in Japan
- Shiga Prefecture
- Tendai Sect
