= Tokugen-in =

Tendai Buddhist temple, Japan

- 徳源院
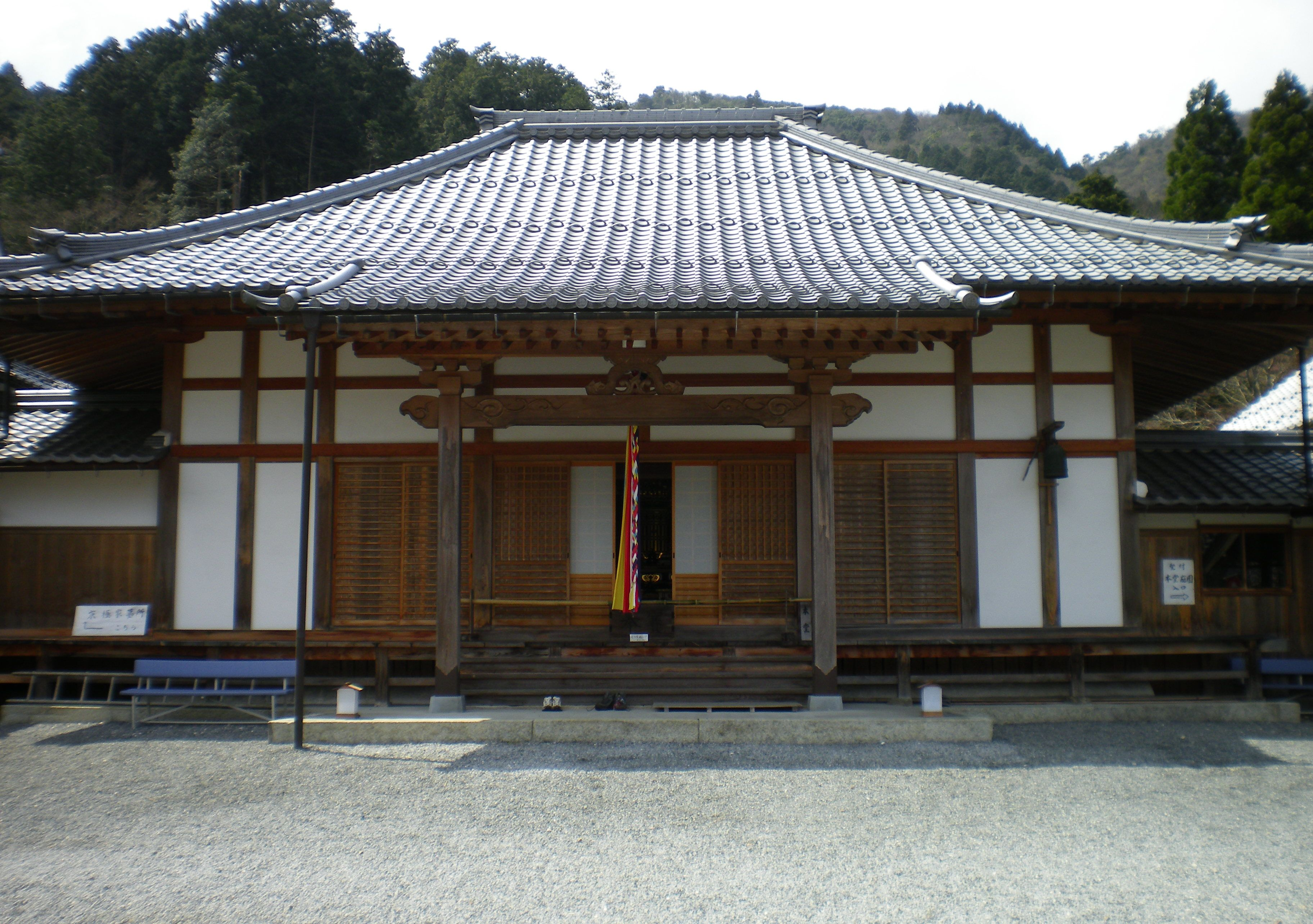
- Tokugen-in Main Hall

- Tokugen-in Tokugen-in (Japan)

Religion
- Affiliation: Buddhist
- Deity: Sho-Kannon Bosatsu
- Rite: Tendai

Location
- Location: 874 Shinmachi, Matsusaka, Mie 515-0075
- Country: Japan
- Interactive map of Tokugen-in
- Coordinates: 35°20′43″N 136°23′15″E

Architecture
- Founder: Kyōgoku Ujinobu
- Completed: 1283

Website
- Official website

Tokugen-in (徳源院) is a Buddhist temple in the Kiyotaki neighborhood of the city of Maibara, Shiga Prefecture Japan. It belongs to the Tendai school of Japanese Buddhism and its main image is a hibutsu statue of Sho-Kannon Bosatsu. The temple is noted as the bodaiji of the Kyōgoku clan, a prominent Sengoku and Edo period daimyō clan. The clan cemetery was designated a National Historic Site in 1936.

== History ==
Tokugen-in is also known as Seiryū-ji (清瀧寺). It was established in 1283 by the founder of the Kyōgoku clan, Kyōgoku Ujinobu, who was shugo of Ōmi Province. The Kyōgoku clan descended from the Uda Genji through the Sasaki clan. Their name derives from the Kyōgoku quarter of Kyoto during the Heian period. The Kyōgoku served as shugo of Ōmi, Hida, Izumo and Oki Provinces at various times in the period before the Ōnin War.

In 1672, the 20th hereditary chieftain, Kyōgoku Taketoyo, the daimyō of Marugame Domain in Sanuki Province, successful petitioned the Tokugawa shogunate for permission to exchange two villages from his holdings in Harima Province with two villages in Ōmi Province surrounding this temple, which he then reconstructed. The temple's name was formally changed to "Tokugen-in" after the posthumous name of his father, Kyōgoku Takakazu. A three-story Pagoda was constructed, and he gathered the tombstones of his ancestors from various locations and organized them into one place.

This three-storied pagoda was designated as a Tangible Cultural Property of Shiga Prefecture in 1973. The tombs consist of two rows of hōkyōintō arranged in two rows. That of Kyōgoku Ujinobu has a height of 278 cm. The upper row consists of eighteen tombs from the first to the 18th generation. The lower row consists of 14 tombs of the 15th generation onwards, with the sizes of the monuments varying depending on the rise and fall in the fortunes of the clan, and form a valuable resource in the study of how the hōkyōintō monuments evolved from the Kamakura period through the end of the Edo period.

The temple has a Japanese garden in a typical style of the early Edo period, and is a Shiga Prefectural Place of Scenic Beauty.

Tokugen-in is a 30-minute walk from the JR Central Kashiwabara Station or ten minutes by car from Ōmi-Nagaoka Station.

== Gallery ==
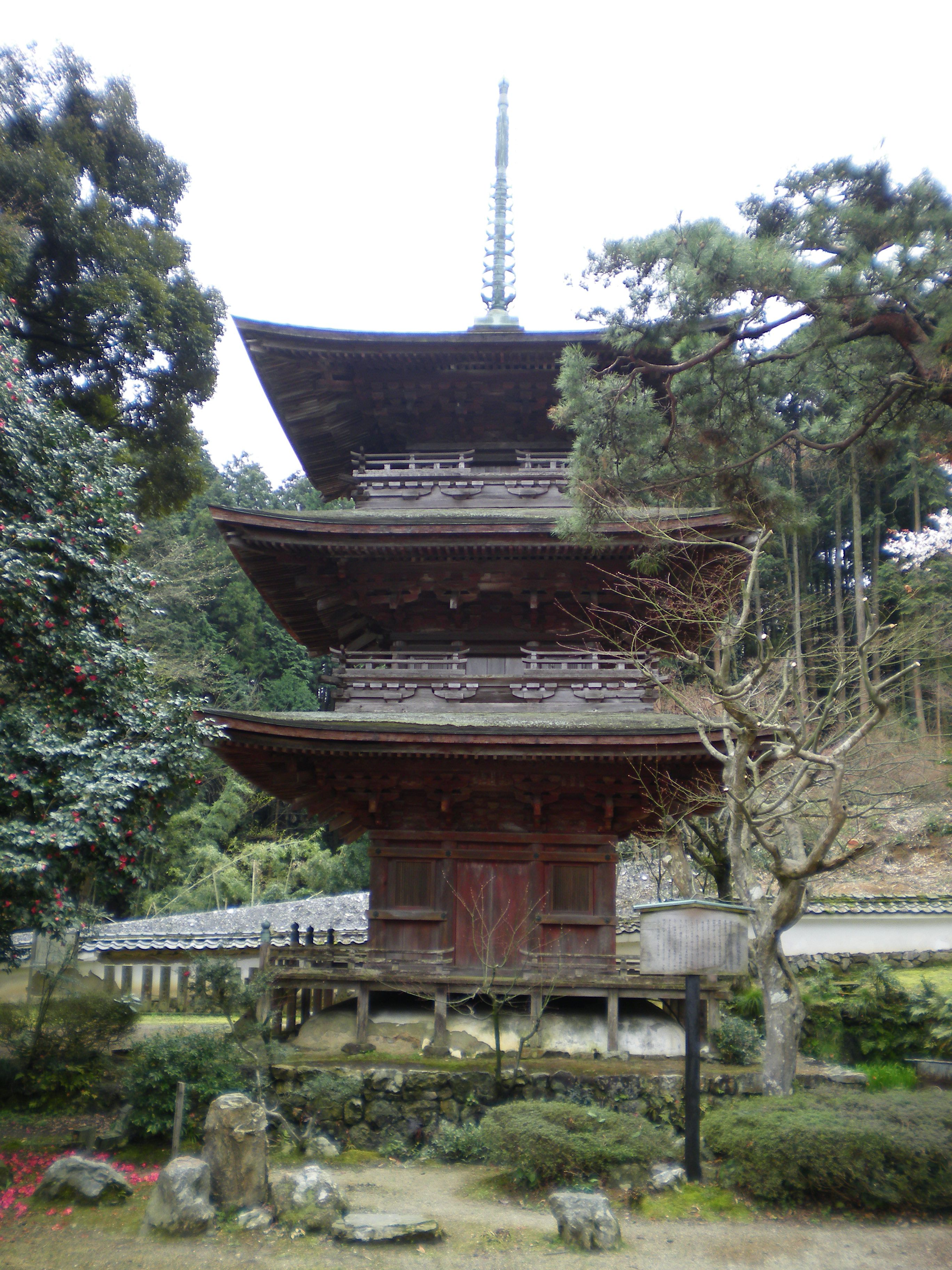
Three-story Pagoda

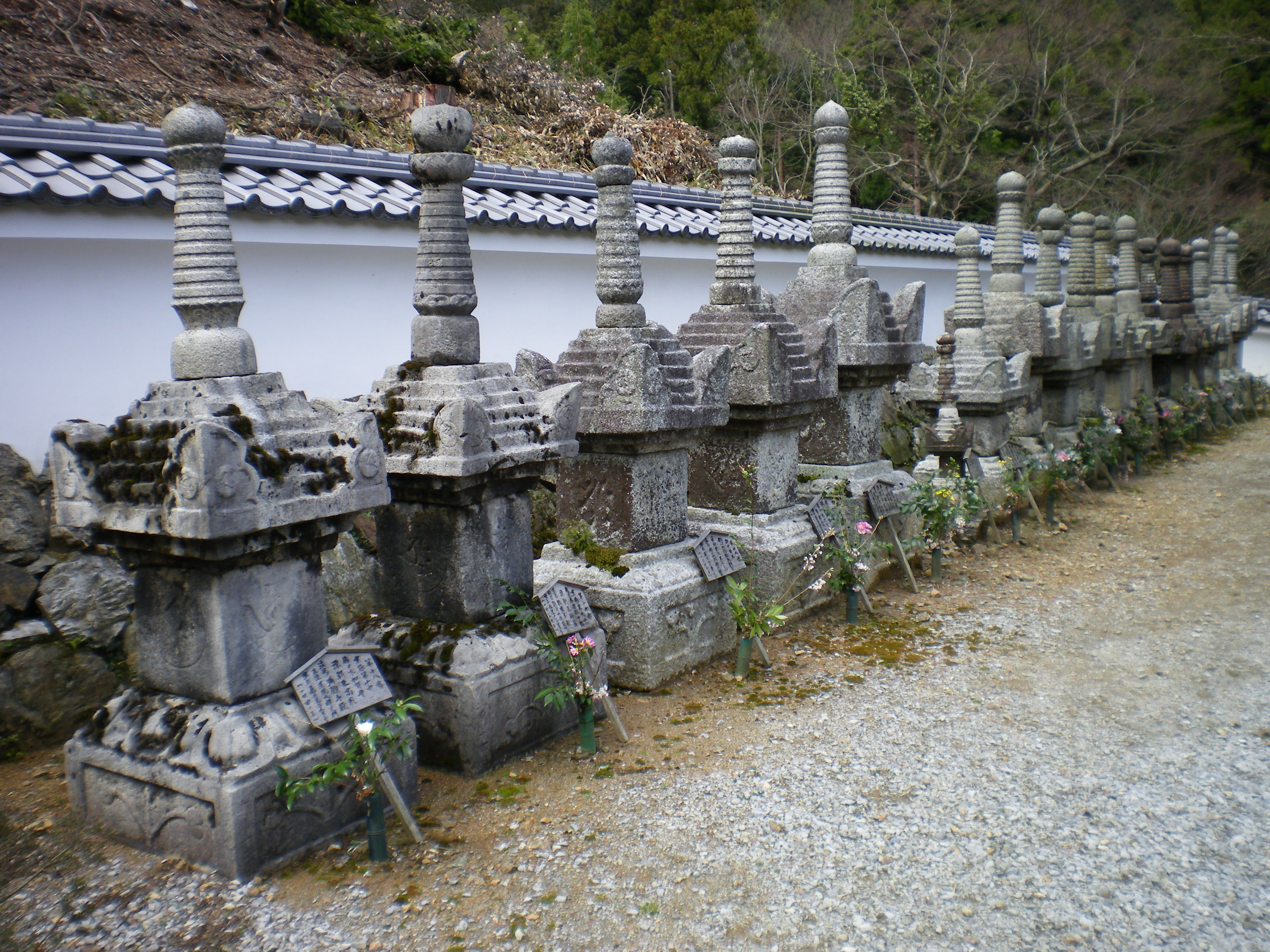
Kyōgoku cemetery

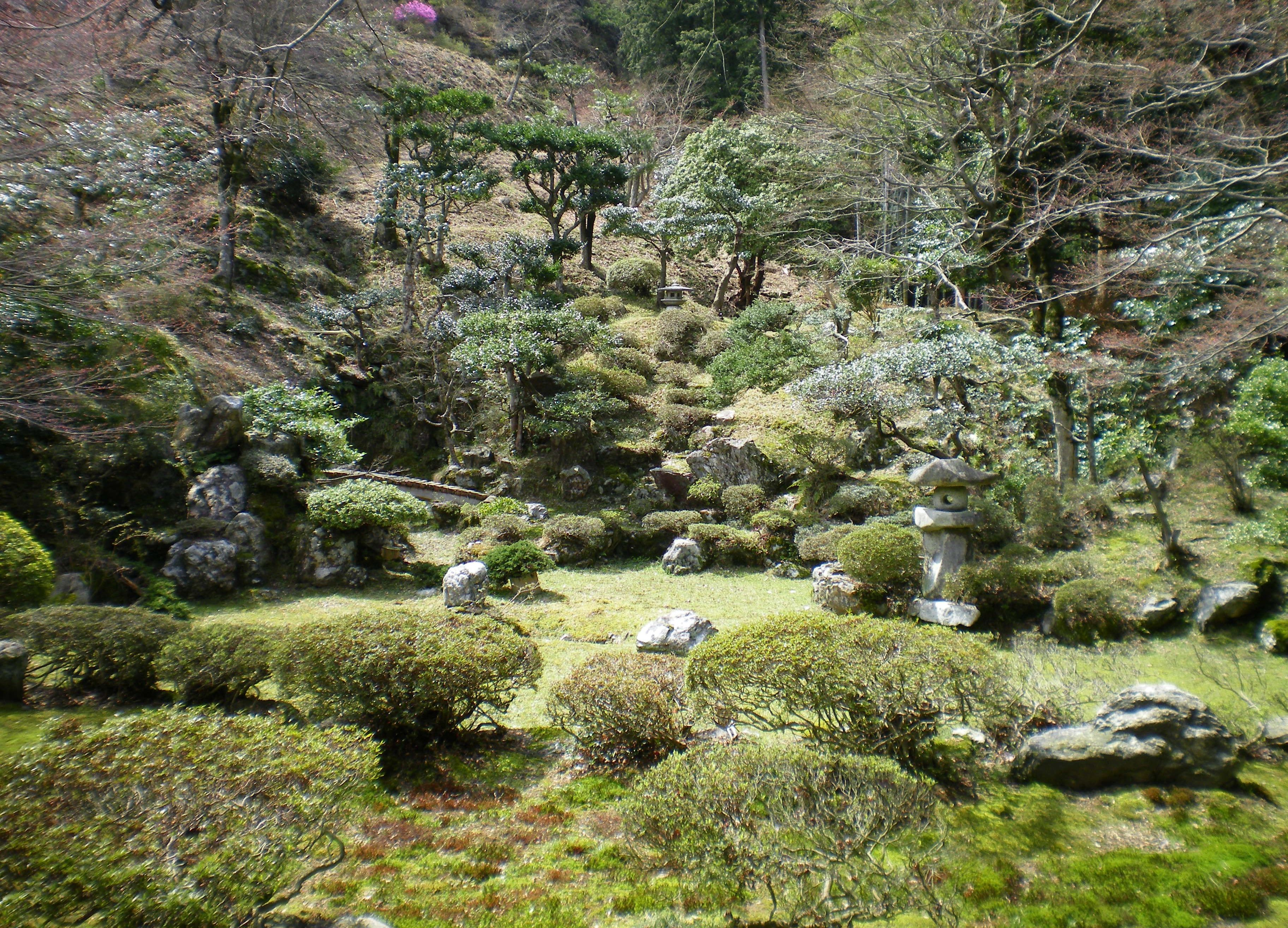
Tokugen-in gardens

== See also ==
- List of Historic Sites of Japan (Shiga)
