= Hyakusai-ji =

Buddhist temple in Shiga Prefecture, Japan

- 百済寺
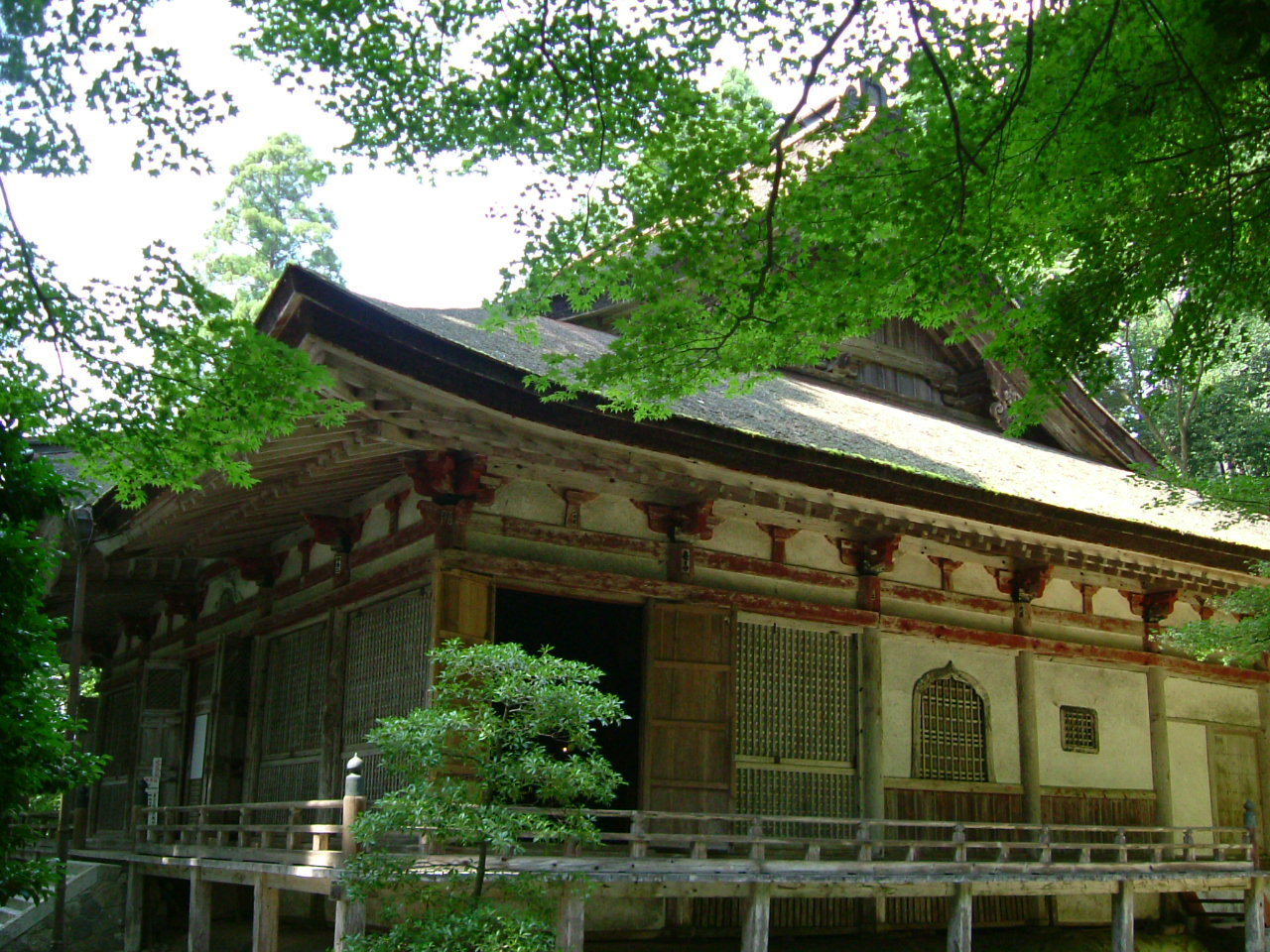
- Hyakusai-ji Main Hall

- Hyakusai-ji Hyakusai-ji (Japan)

Religion
- Affiliation: Buddhist
- Deity: Juichmen Kannon Bosatsu
- Rite: Tendai

Location
- Location: Hyakusaiji, Higashiōmi, Shiga
- Country: Japan
- Coordinates: 35°07′34″N 136°17′32″E

Architecture
- Founder: c.Shotoku Taishi
- Completed: c.606AD

Website
- Official website

Hyakusai-ji (百済寺) is a Buddhist temple in the Hyakusaiji neighborhood of the city of Higashiōmi, Shiga Prefecture, Japan. It belongs to the Tendai school of Japanese Buddhism, and together with Kongōrin-ji and Saimyō-ji is regard as one of the "Three Great Temples" east of Lake Biwa. It was designated a National Historic Site in 2008.

== History ==
Hyakusai-ji is located on the western flank of the Suzuka Mountains, east of Lake Biwa. According to the temple, Prince Shotoku erected this temple in 606 AD after his tutor from Goguryeo, the monk Hyeja, found a cedar tree in the mountains glowing with a mysterious light. The prince carved an image of an eleven-faced Kannon Bosatsu directly into the living wood of the tree and had a hall built around it. Although Hyeja was from Goguryeo, the temple is named after the Korean kingdom of Baekje as the layout of the temple was patterned after the temple of Ryuun-ji in that kingdom. However, the first appearance of the temple in the historical documentation is from 1089 AD, so it is uncertain to what extent the temple legend of its connection with Prince Shotoku reflects actual historic facts. During the Heian period, as with many temples in Ōmi Province, it came under the influence of Enryaku-ji and Hyakusai-ji became a temple of the Tendai sect. Through the Kamakura period, the temple was a huge establishment, with over 1000 chapels spread across numerous mountain valleys. The temple suffered from a severe fire in 1498, and only a few years later, in 1503, it was almost razed completely during a conflict between the Ōmi shugo Rokkaku Takayori and the shugodai Iba Tadataka. These two fires destroyed all of the ancient buildings and Buddhist statues, but also all of the temple's records and documents of its founding.

The temple eventually recovered, and the Jesuit missionary Luis Frois commented about the temple's prosperity during a visit. In 1573, the temple was again the center of a conflict, this time between Rokkaku Yoshikata and Oda Nobunaga and its main hall was again destroyed. This hall was rebuilt in 1584 by Hori Hidemasa. In 1602, with the establishment of the Tokugawa shogunate, the temple was awarded a kokudaka of 146 koku for its upkeep. This was increased by another 100 koku in 1617 by Shogun Tokugawa Hidetada. From 1634 through 1650 most of the buildings of the temple were reconstructed by Ryosuke, a disciple and younger brother of the archpriest Tenkai, with the assistance of Hikone Domain, and many of these structures survive to this day, including the current Hondō, which is a National Important Cultural Property.

The temple is approximately ten minutes by car from Yōkaichi Station on the Ohmi Railway.

== Gallery ==
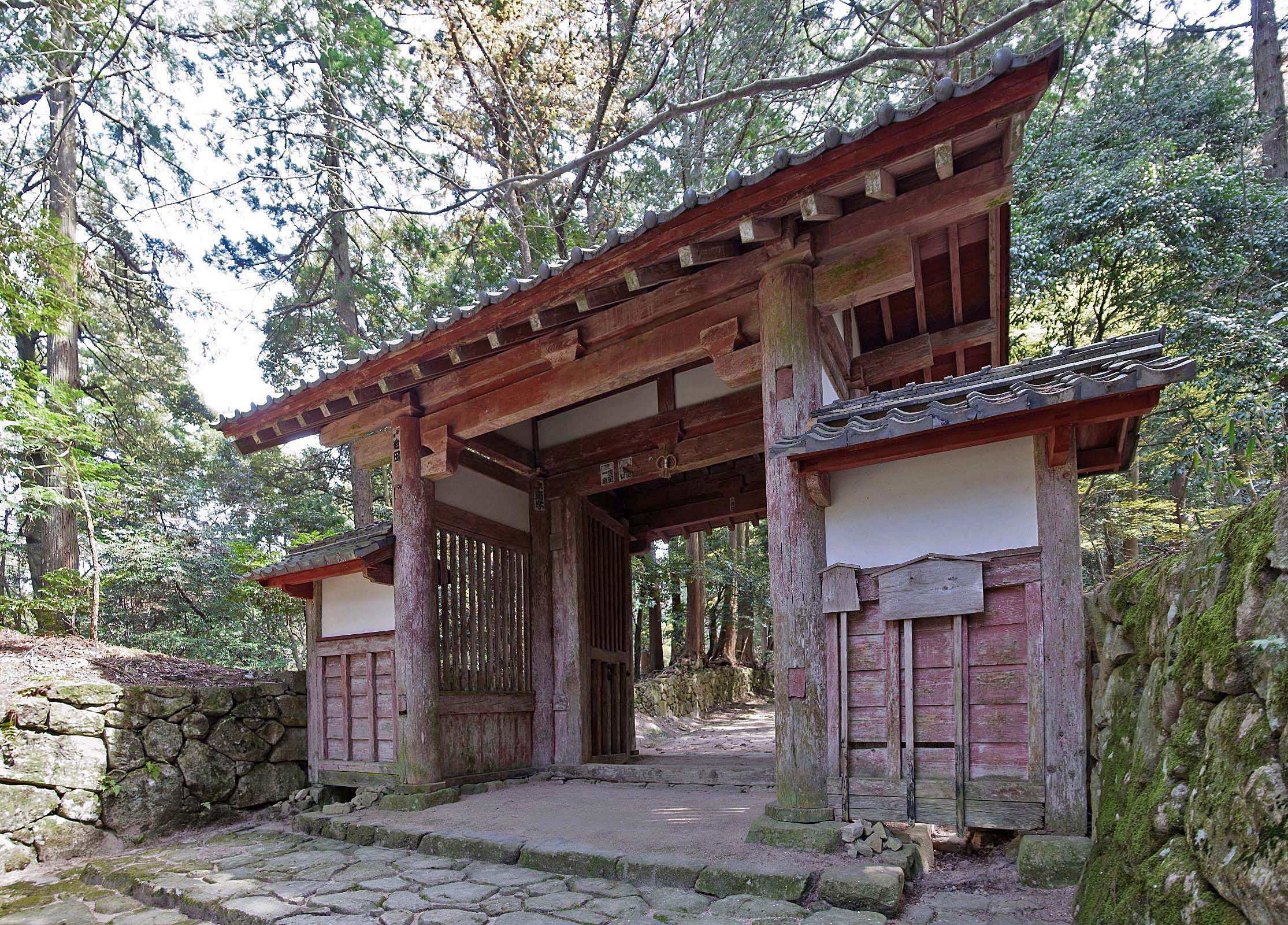
Akamon Gate

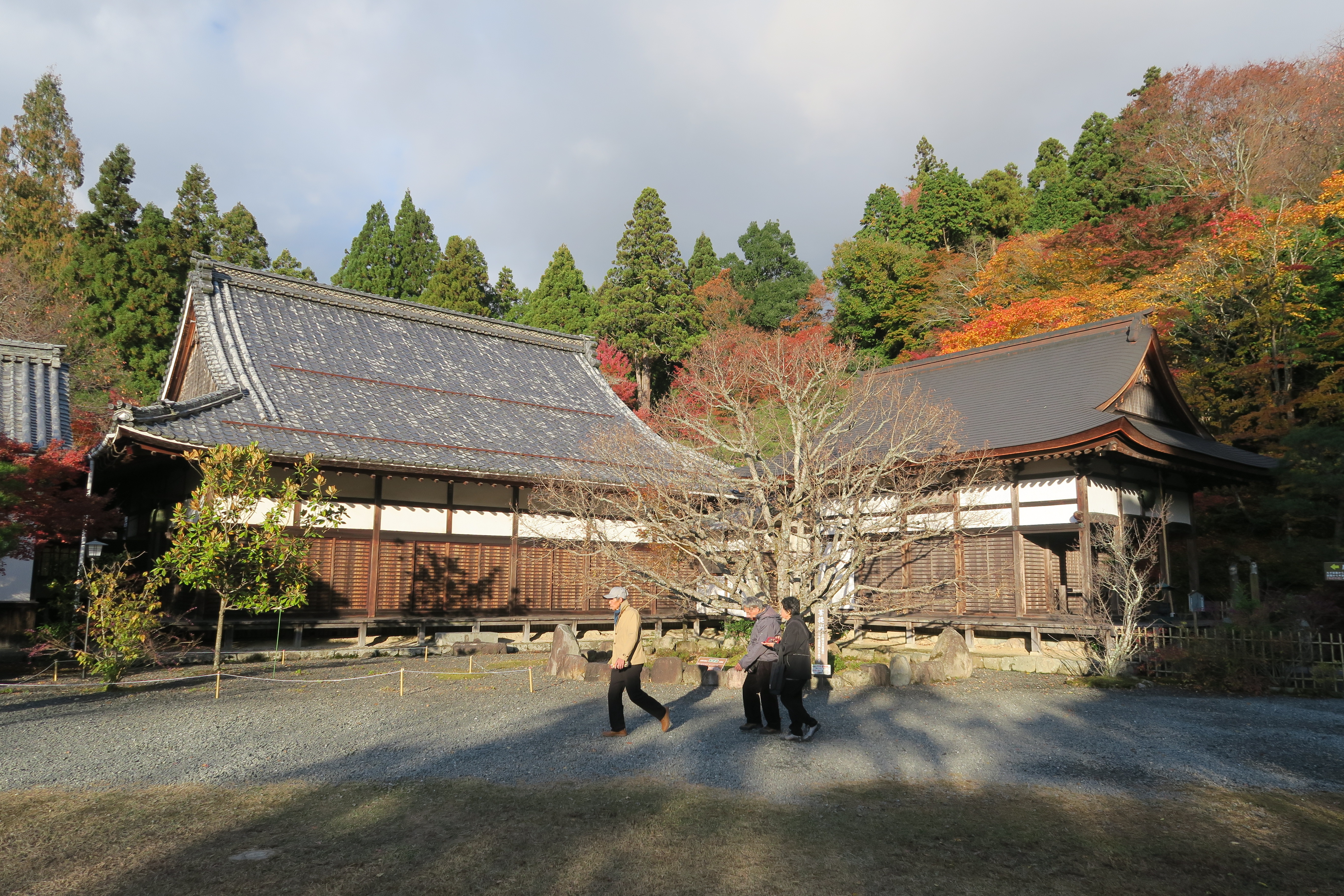
Fudō-dō

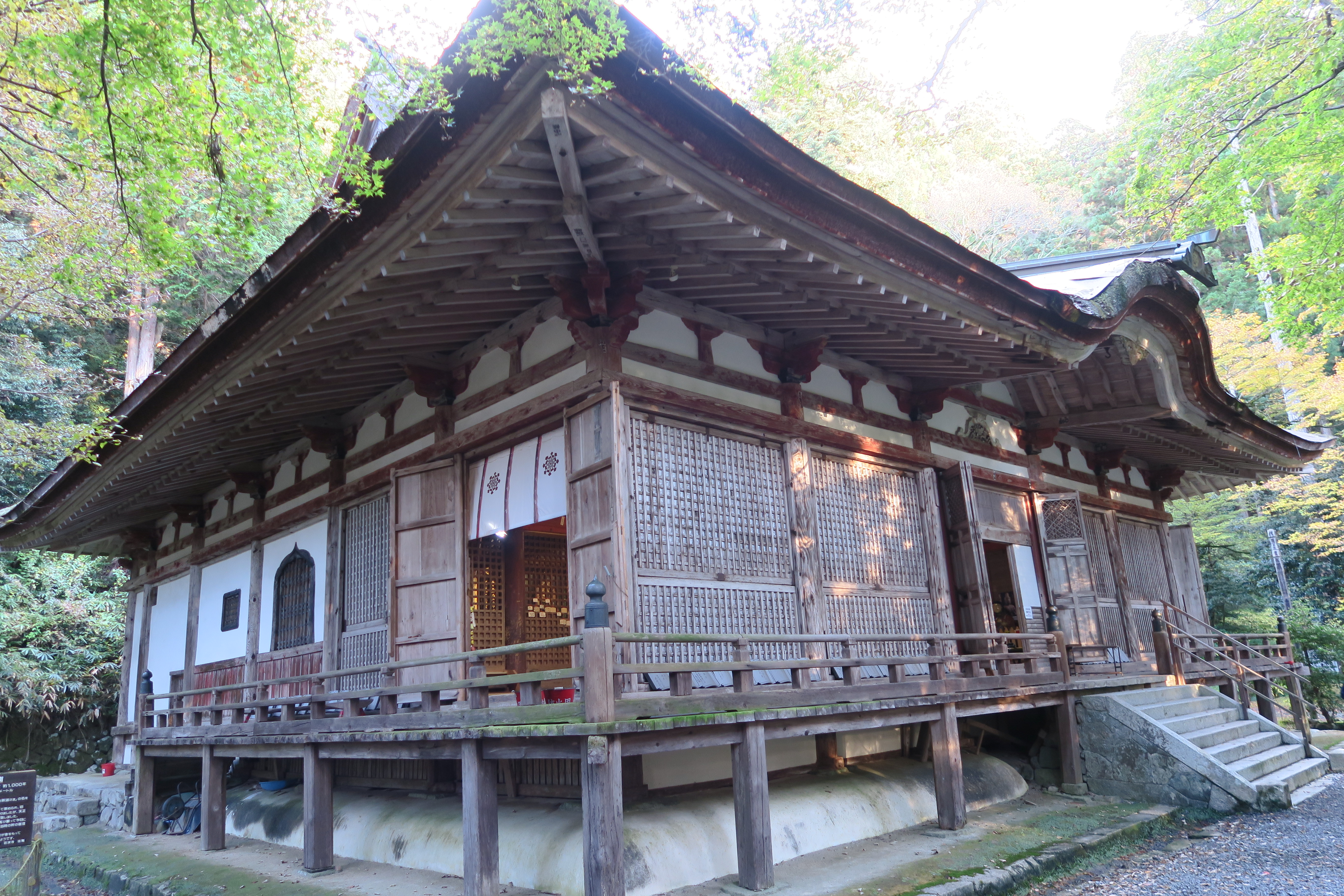
Hondō

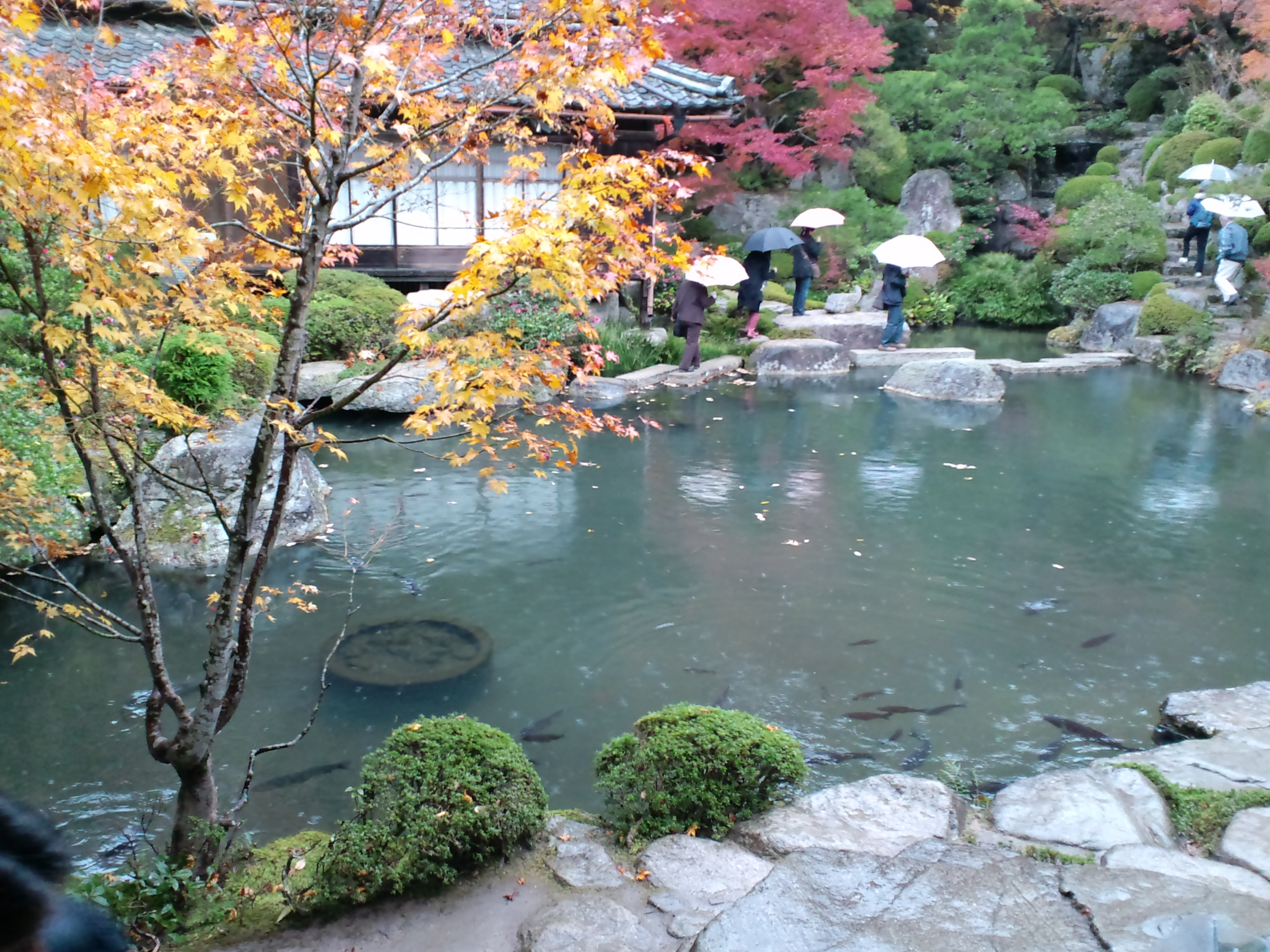
Gardens

== See also ==
- List of Historic Sites of Japan (Shiga)
