= Matsubara Shimoyashiki Gardens =

Gardens in Hikone, Japan

- 松原下屋敷庭園
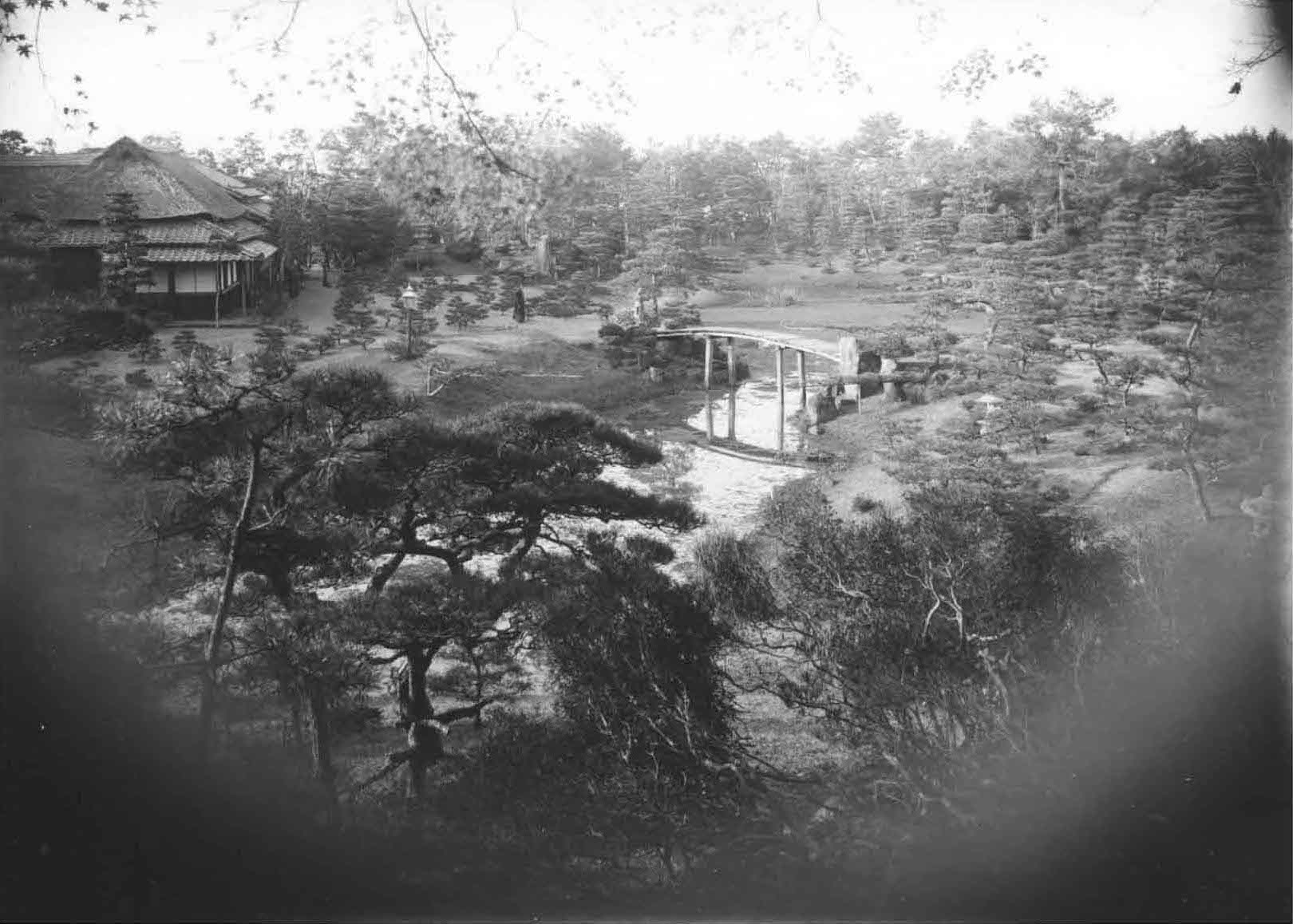
- View of the gardens in the Meiji era
- Interactive map of Matsubara Shimoyashiki Gardens
- Type: Japanese garden
- Location: Hikone, Shiga Prefecture, Japan
- Coordinates: 35°17′10″N 136°15′02″E
- Area: 20,881.26 square metres (224,764.0 sq ft)
- Created: 1810

The Former Hikone Domain Matsubara Shimoyashiki Gardens (旧彦根藩松原下屋敷（お浜御殿）庭園, kyū-Hikone-han Matsubara shimo-yashiki (Ohama goten) teien), also known as the Ohama Goten Gardens, are a partially-preserved Edo period stroll garden situated a short distance to the north of Hikone Castle on the shore of Lake Biwa in Hikone, Shiga Prefecture, Japan. The gardens were laid out at his "lower" or suburban residence by daimyō Ii Naonaka (井伊直中) in Bunka 7 (1810), and have been designated a Place of Scenic Beauty, as well as forming part of Japan Heritage "Story" #008 Lake Biwa and Its Surroundings, and of the UNESCO World Heritage Site nomination Hikone Castle (currently on the Tentative List).

== Description ==
The Daimyō garden (大名庭園) is classed as a stroll garden with a spring-fed pond (池泉回遊式庭園) and, like the Hama-rikyū Gardens, are a rare example of the shio-iri (汐入形式) or "tidal" style, the water level of the central pond changing with that of Lake Biwa, from which it is in fact fed; the gardens are Japan's only example of a freshwater shio-iri style garden. During the Edo period, activities in the garden included tea ceremonies, as well as fishing nearby and horse-riding on the track immediately to the west. Remaining structures from the Edo period residence include the okuzashiki (inner room), storehouse, rice storehouse, kitchen building, and gatehouse. After the abolition of the han system in Meiji 4 (1871), the family had their principal residence in Tōkyō, but continued to visit Hikone. The residence - which came to be known as the Senmatsukan (千松館) - was extended and the gardens renovated; the large hall and entrance building date from 1889. In 1947, the family moved back from Tōkyō, making this their principal residence. Lost structures include a teahouse, shoin, and gate.

== See also ==
- List of Places of Scenic Beauty of Japan (Shiga)
- List of World Heritage Sites in Japan
