= Shūgo =

- Gender: Male

Origin
- Origin: Japanese
- Meaning: Different meanings depending on the kanji used

Shūgo, Shugo or Shuugo (written: 周吾, 修吾, 宗悟 or シューゴ in katakana) is a masculine Japanese given name. Notable people with the name include:

- Shugo Nakamura (仲村 宗悟; born 1988), Japanese voice actor and singer
- Shugo Nishikawa (西川 周吾; born 1977), Japanese footballer
- Shugo Oshinari (忍成 修吾; born 1981), Japanese actor
- Shugo Tokumaru (トクマル シューゴ; born 1980), Japanese singer-songwriter
- Shugo Tsuji (辻 周吾; born 1997), Japanese footballer

Shūgō or Shuugou (written: 周剛) is a separate given name, though it may be romanized the same way. Notable people with the name include:

- Shugo Kawahara (川原 周剛; born 1980), Japanese footballer
