= Ōmi-Nagaoka Station =

Railway station in Maibara, Shiga Prefecture, Japan

CA81 Ōmi-Nagaoka Station 近江長岡駅
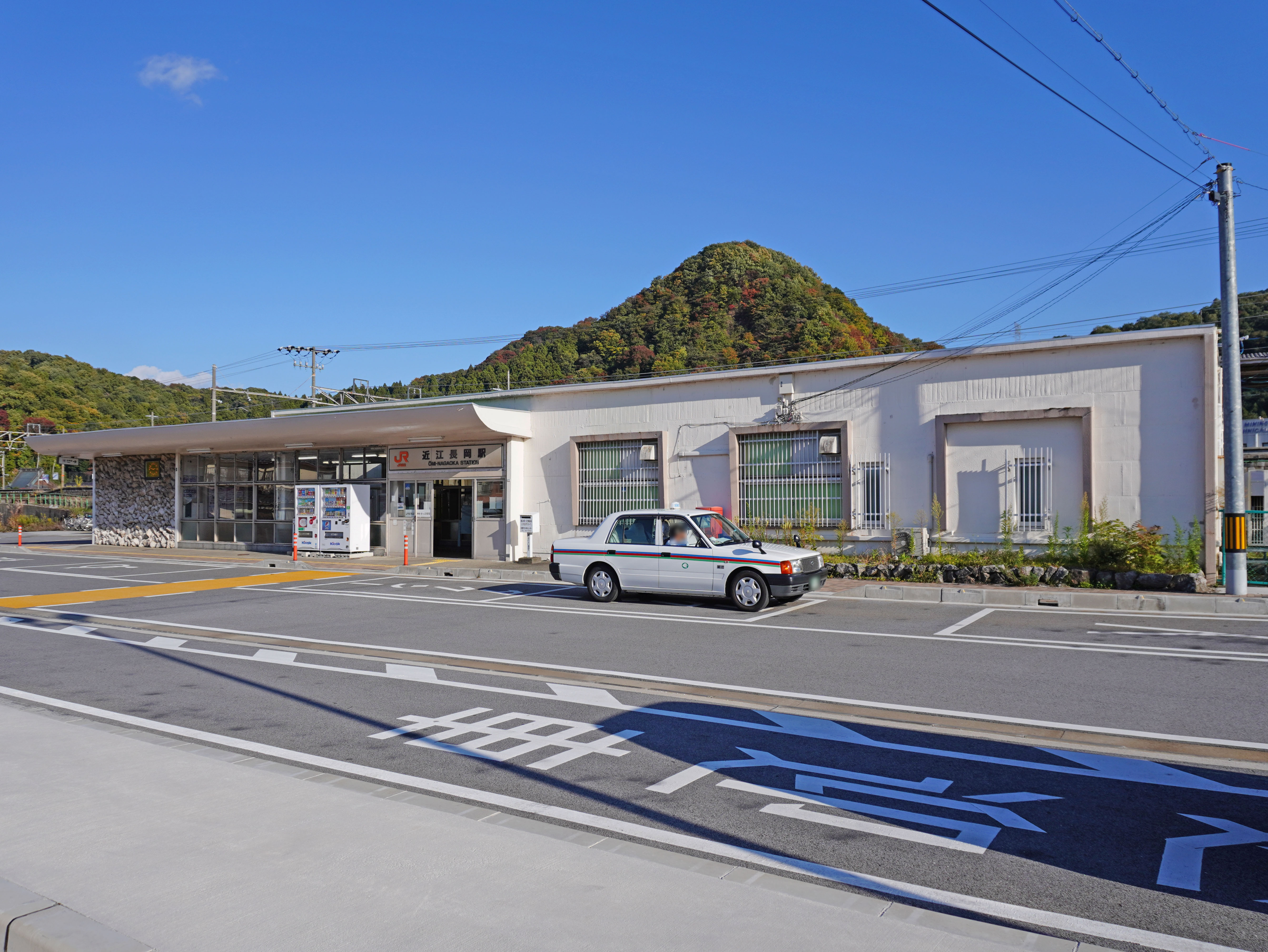
- Ōmi-Nagaoka Station in November 2022

General information
- Location: 1700-2 Nagaoka, Maibara-shi, Shiga-ken 521-0242; Japan
- Coordinates: 35.3593°N 136.3735°E
- Operator: JR Central; JR Freight
- Line: ■ Tōkaidō Main Line
- Distance: 435.2 km from Tokyo
- Platforms: 2 island platforms
- Tracks: 4

Other information
- Status: Staffed

History
- Opened: 1 July 1889
- Former names: Nagaoka (1889 - 1914)

Passengers
- 2023–2024: 1,566 daily
Location
- Location within Shiga Prefecture Location within Japan

Ōmi-Nagaoka Station (近江長岡駅, Ōmi-Nagaoka-eki) is a passenger railway station located in the city of Maibara, Shiga Prefecture, Japan, operated by the Central Japan Railway Company (JR Tōkai). It is also a freight depot for the Japan Freight Railway Company (JR Freight).

== Lines ==
Ōmi-Nagaoka Station is served by the JR Central Tōkaidō Main Line, and is 435.2 kilometers from the terminus of the Tōkaidō line at Tokyo.

== Station layout ==
The station consists of two island platforms connected by an underground passage. The station is staffed.

=== Platforms ===
1, 2	■ Tōkaidō Main Line	for Ōgaki, Nagoya
3, 4	■ Tōkaidō Main Line	for Maibara, Kyoto

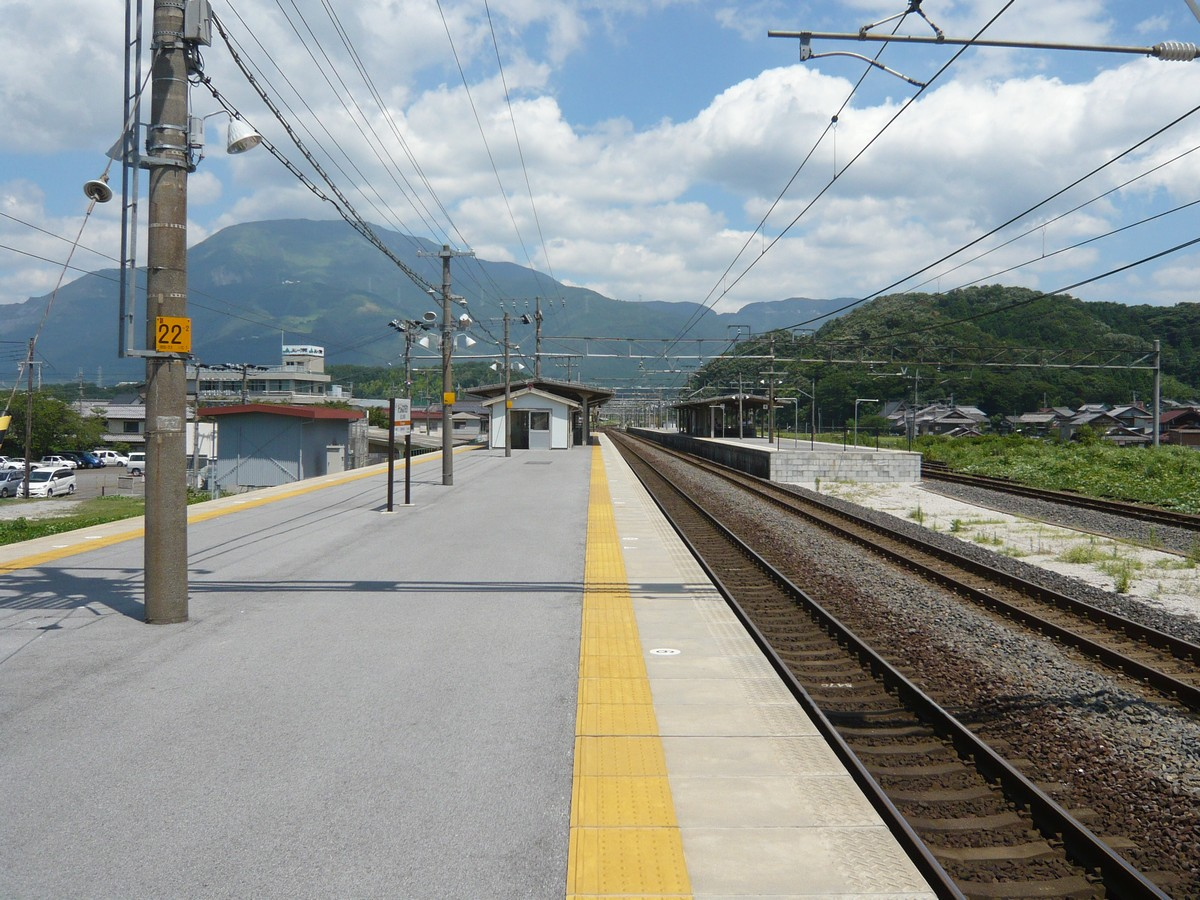
The up platform in August 2007

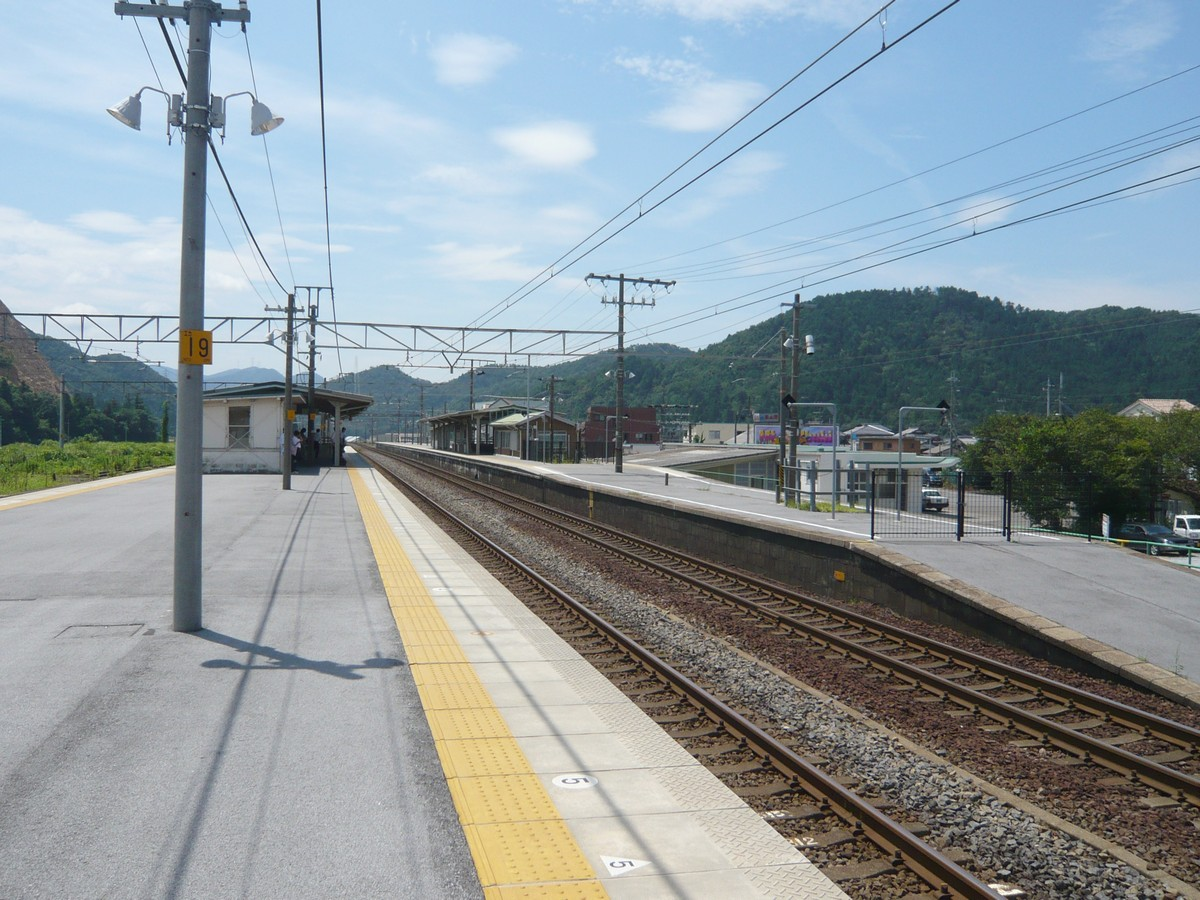
The down platform in August 2007

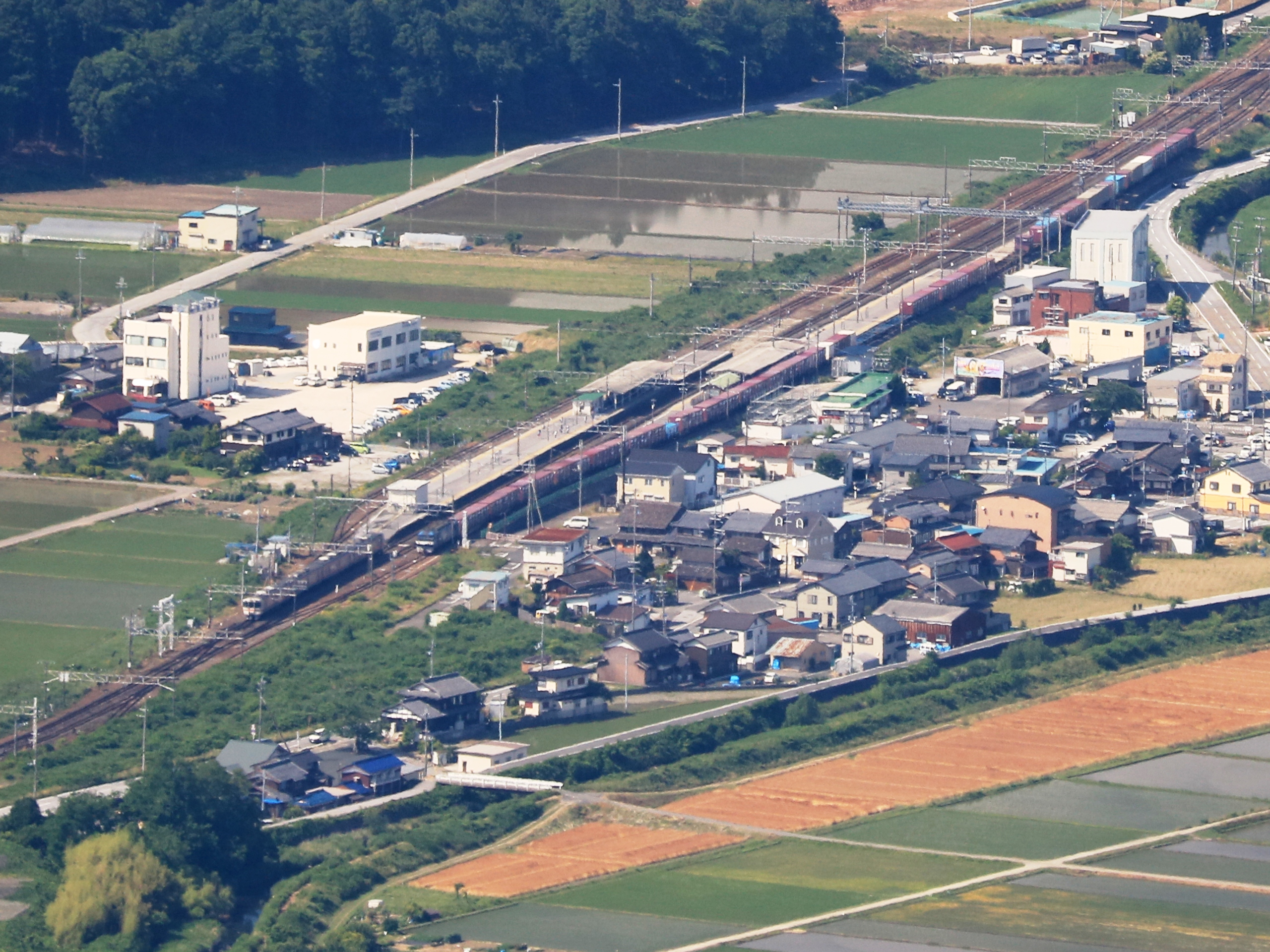
Ōmi-Nagaoka Station viewed from nearby Mt. Ibuki in June 2017

== Adjacent stations ==
«	Service	»
Tokaido Main Line
Limited Express "Hida": Does not stop at this station
Kashiwabara	Special Rapid	Samegai
Kashiwabara	New Rapid	Samegai
Kashiwabara	Rapid	Samegai
Kashiwabara	Sectional Rapid	Samegai
Kashiwabara	Local	Samegai

== History ==
The station opened on 1 July 1889, initially named Nagaoka Station (長岡駅). It was renamed Ōmi-Nagaoka Station on 1 December 1914. With the privatization of Japanese National Railways (JNR) on 1 April 1987, the station came under the control of JR Central.

Station numbering was introduced to the section of the Tōkaidō Line operated by JR Central in March 2018; Ōmi-Nagaoka Station was assigned station number CA81.

== Passenger statistics ==
In fiscal 2019, the station was used by an average of 829 passengers daily (boarding passengers only).

== Surrounding area ==
- Maibara City Hall Yamahighashi Government Building
- Nagaoka Genji Firefly Special Natural Monument

== See also ==
- List of railway stations in Japan
