= Kashiwabara Station =

Railway station in Maibara, Shiga Prefecture, Japan

CA80 Kashiwabara Station 柏原駅
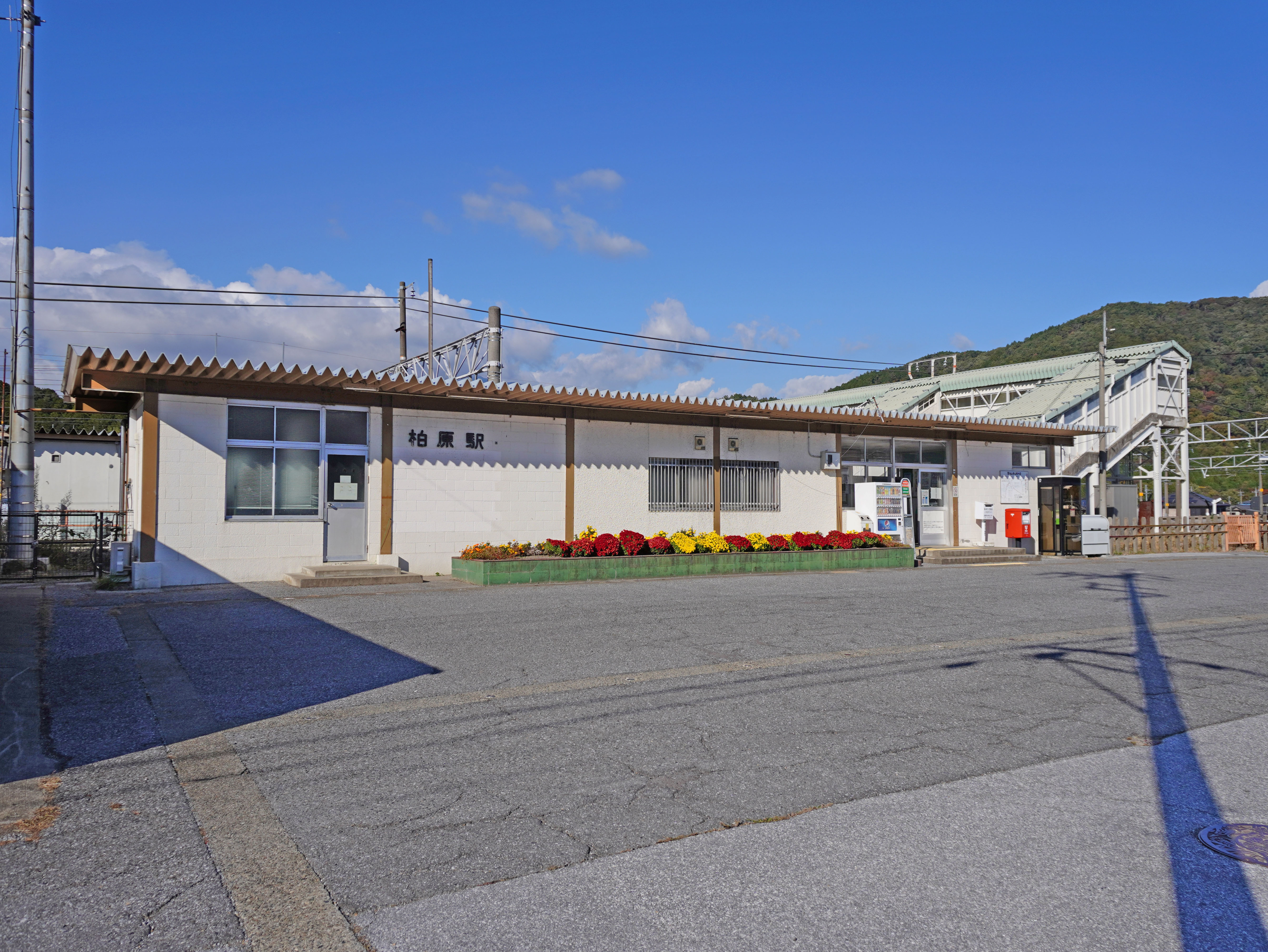
- JR Kashiwabara Station in November 2022

General information
- Location: 1081 Kashiwabara, Maibara-shi, Shiga-ken 521-0202; Japan
- Coordinates: 35.3447°N 136.403°E
- Operator: JR Central
- Line: Tōkaidō Main Line
- Distance: 430.9 kilometers from Tokyo
- Platforms: 2 island platforms

Other information
- Status: Staffed

History
- Opened: February 21, 1900

Passengers
- 2023–2024: 424 daily
Location
- Location within Shiga Prefecture Location within Japan

Kashiwabara Station (柏原駅, Kashiwabara-eki) is a passenger railway station located in the city of Maibara, Shiga Prefecture, Japan, operated by the Central Japan Railway Company (JR Tōkai).

== Lines ==
Kashiwabara Station is served by the JR Central Tōkaidō Main Line, and is 430.9 kilometers from the terminus of the Tōkaidō line at Tokyo.

== Station layout ==
The station consists of two island platforms connected by a footbridge. The station is staffed.

=== Platforms ===
1, 2	■ Tōkaidō Main Line	for Maibara, Kyoto
3, 4	■ Tōkaidō Main Line	For Ōgaki, Nagoya

== Adjacent stations ==
«	Service	»
Central Japan Railway Company
Tōkaidō Main Line
Limited Express "Hida": Does not stop at this station
Sekigahara	Special Rapid	Ōmi-Nagaoka
Sekigahara	New Rapid	Ōmi-Nagaoka
Sekigahara	Rapid	Ōmi-Nagaoka
Sekigahara	Sectional Rapid	Ōmi-Nagaoka
Sekigahara	Local	Ōmi-Nagaoka

== History ==
Kashiwabara Station opened on February 21, 1900 on the Japanese Government Railway (JGR) Tōkaidō Line. The station came under the aegis of the Central Japan Railway Company on April 1, 1987 due to the privatization of JNR.

Station numbering was introduced to the section of the Tōkaidō Line operated by JR Central in March 2018; Kashiwabara Station was assigned station number CA80.

== Passenger statistics ==
In fiscal 2019, the station was used by an average of 259 passengers daily (boarding passengers only).

== Surrounding area ==
- Tokugen-in, Buddhist temple with National Historic Site cemetery of the Kyōgoku clan
- Maibara City Kashiwabara Administrative Service Center
- Maibara City Kashiwabara Junior High School
- Maibara City Kashiwabara Elementary School
- Kashiwabara-juku History Museum

== See also ==
- List of railway stations in Japan
