= Kōra, Shiga =

Kōra 甲良町
- Town
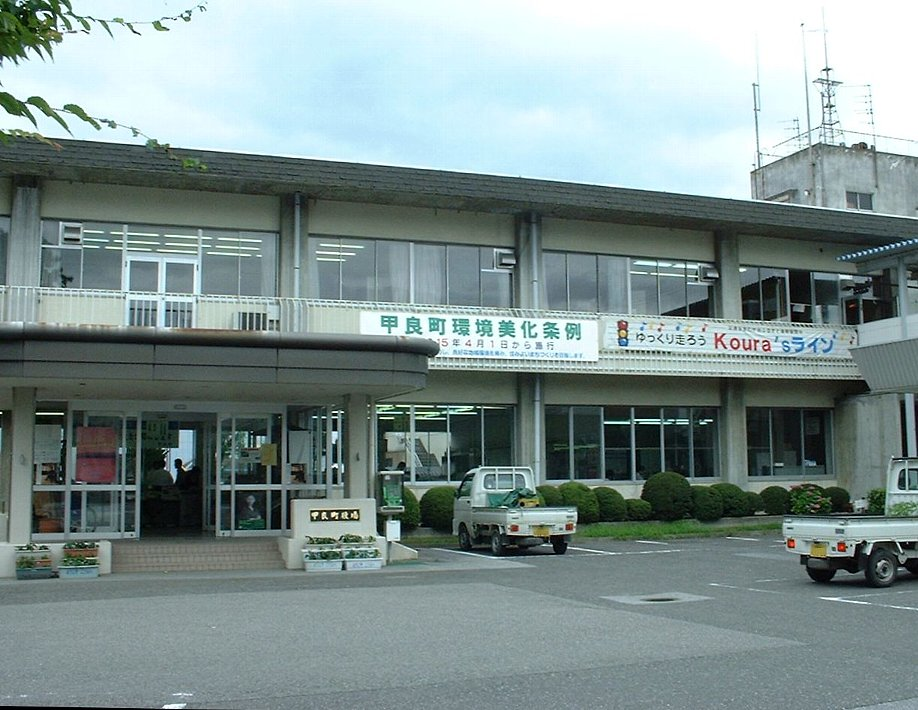
- Kōra Town Hall

- Flag Emblem

- Coordinates: 35°12′N 136°16′E
- Country: Japan
- Region: Kansai
- Prefecture: Shiga Prefecture
- District: Inukami

Area
  - Total: 13.63 km^{2} (5.26 sq mi)

Population (August 2021)
  - Total: 6,721
  - Density: 493.1/km^{2} (1,277/sq mi)
- Time zone: UTC+9 (Japan Standard Time)
- Phone number: 0749-38-3311
- Address: 353-1 Zaiji, Kōra-chō, Inukami-gun, Shiga-ken 522-0244
- Website: Official website
- Symbols
- Flower: Wisteria
- Tree: Zelkova serrata

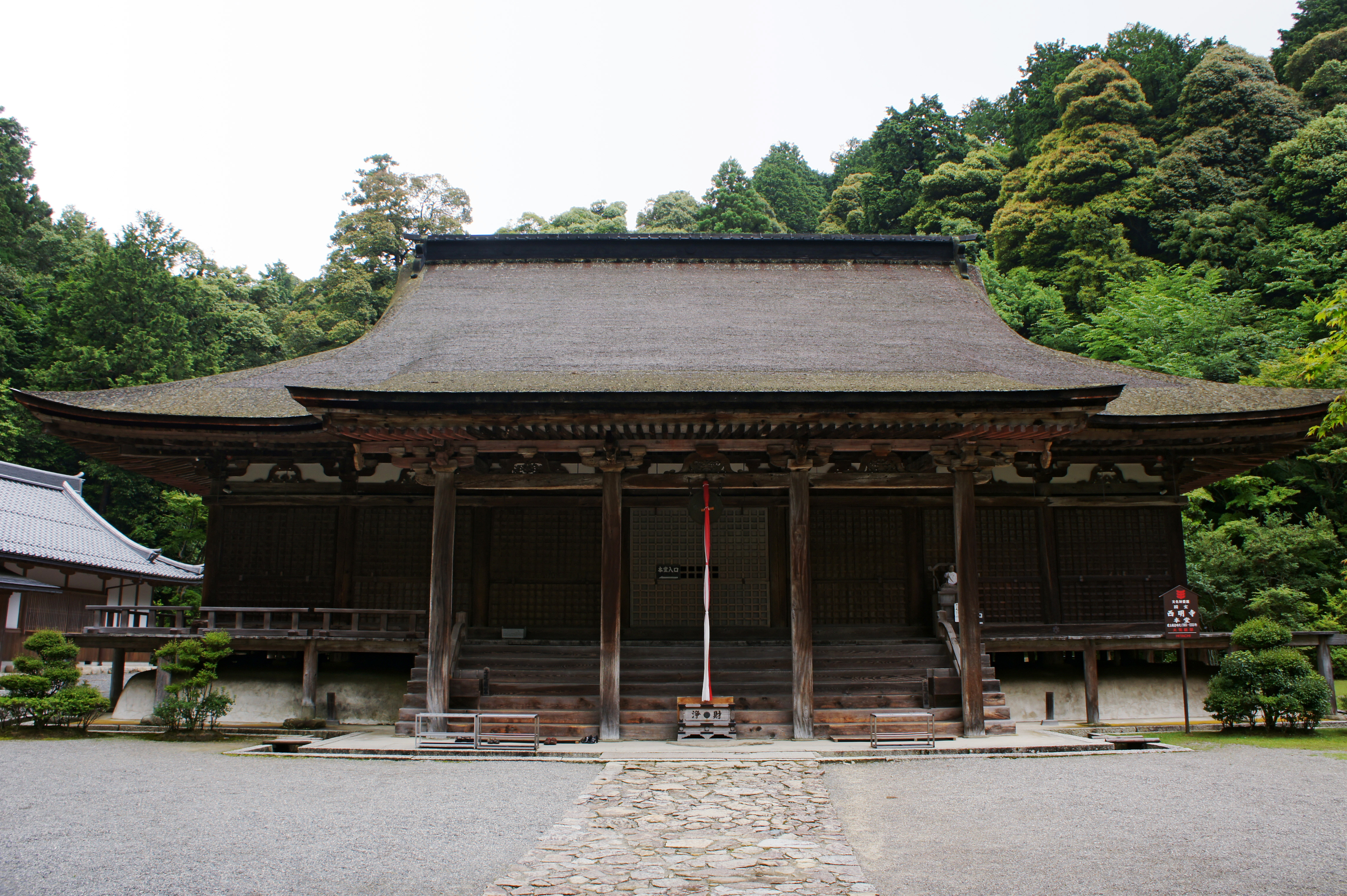
Saimyō-ji Main Hall

Kōra (甲良町, Kōra-chō) is a town located in Shiga Prefecture, Japan. As of 1 August 2021, the town had an estimated population of 6,721 in 2619 households and a population density of 490 persons per km². The total area of the town is 13.63 square kilometres (5.26 sq mi).

== Geography ==
Kōra is the second smallest municipality in Shiga in terms of surface area (after neighboring Toyosato). It is located on an alluvial fan of the Inukami River in central Shiga Prefecture in the Ōmi Basin, near the foothills of the Suzuka Mountains. The entire area is a lowland with almost no undulations.

=== Surrounding municipalities ===
Shiga Prefecture

- Aishō, to the south
- Hikone, to the north
- Taga, to the east
- Toyosato, to the west

=== Climate ===
Kōra has a humid subtropical climate (Köppen Cfa) characterized by warm summers and cool winters with light to no snowfall. The average annual temperature in Kōra is 14.1 °C. The average annual rainfall is 1810 mm with September as the wettest month. The temperatures are highest on average in August, at around 25.9 °C, and lowest in January, at around 2.7 °C.

== Demographics ==
Per Japanese census data, the population of Kōra peaked around 1980 and has declined since.

Historical population
Year	Pop.	±%
1920	6,863	—
1930	6,979	+1.7%
1940	6,881	−1.4%
1950	8,687	+26.2%
1960	8,621	−0.8%
1970	8,724	+1.2%
1980	9,058	+3.8%
1990	8,811	−2.7%
2000	8,169	−7.3%
2010	7,500	−8.2%
2020	6,362	−15.2%

== History ==
The area of Kōra was part of ancient Ōmi Province and archaeological excavations have found the traces of settlements dating to at least the Kofun period. From the Heian period, the area was divided between several shōen landed estates. The noted Tendai-sect temple of Saimyō-ji in Kōra was founded in the Heian period. During the Nanboku-chō and into the Sengoku period, the area was hotly contested between the Kyōgoku clan and the Rokkaku clan. The noted warlord Todo Takatora was born in what is now part of Kōra town and master carpenters who built Nikkō Tōshō-gū came from this area. During the Edo period, the entire area of the town was part of the holdings of Hikone Domain under the Tokugawa shogunate.

The villages of Higashi-Kōra and Nishi-Kōra were created on April 1, 1889 with the establishment of the modern municipalities system. The two villages were merged on April 1, 1955 to create the town of Kōra.

== Government ==
Kōra has a mayor-council form of government with a directly elected mayor and a unicameral city council of 12 members. Kōra, collectively with the other municipalities of Inukami District, contributes one member to the Shiga Prefectural Assembly. In terms of national politics, the town is part of Shiga 2nd district of the lower house of the Diet of Japan.

== Economy ==
Agriculture has dominated the local economy since ancient times. Manufacturing includes a number of small to medium sized textile, chemicals, and metals processing factories.

== Education ==
Kōra has two public elementary schools and one public middle school operated by the town government. The town does not have a high school; however, the prefecture does operate one special education school for the handicapped.

== Transportation ==
=== Railway ===
Ohmi Railway – Main Line

- Amago

=== Highway ===
- Meishin Expressway
- National Route 307

== Local attractions ==
- Hoyoji Ruins: Remains of an Asuka period settlement
- Saimyō-ji: Major Buddhist temple
- Shimonogō Site: Remains of a Kofun period settlement
- Zaijihachiman Shrine: Shinto shrine connected with the Todo clan, noted for its wisteria.
