= Japan Heritage =

Cultural program of the Japanese government

Japan Heritage (日本遺産, Nihon Isan) is a programme sponsored by the Japanese Agency for Cultural Affairs, aimed at valorization by local governments and other bodies, that sees individual Cultural Properties across different categories as well as other not-yet-designated assets grouped together into thematic "stories" that the agency then designates as "Japan Heritage". The first asset was designated in 2015, and as of June 2020, there were 104 of these narratives.

== List ==
Story	Title	Image	Location		Tangible Properties	Intangible Properties	Folk Properties	Monuments	Other Properties	Undesignated Assets	Ref.
Story	Title	Image	Prefecture	Municipality	Tangible Properties	Intangible Properties	Folk Properties	Monuments	Other Properties	Undesignated Assets	Ref.
#001	Educational Heritage from Early-Modern Japan (1568–1868): The Origins of Academics and Decorum 近世日本の教育遺産群～学ぶ心・礼節の本源～ Kinsei Nihon no kyōiku isan-gun (manabu kokoro・reisetsu no hongen)		Ibaraki	Mito				Former Kōdōkan; Tokiwa Park (Kairaku-en); Nisshin Juku Site		Former Mito Shōkōkan (ja); Dai Nihonshi	
#001	Educational Heritage from Early-Modern Japan (1568–1868): The Origins of Academics and Decorum 近世日本の教育遺産群～学ぶ心・礼節の本源～ Kinsei Nihon no kyōiku isan-gun (manabu kokoro・reisetsu no hongen)		Tochigi	Ashikaga	National Treasure Chinese books (Correct Interpretation of the Book of Rites, Correct Interpretation of the Book of Documents, Wen Xuan, Detailed Commentary on the Book of Changes)		Sekiten festival (ja)	Ashikaga Gakkō Site (including the Confucian Temple and associated buildings)			
#001	Educational Heritage from Early-Modern Japan (1568–1868): The Origins of Academics and Decorum 近世日本の教育遺産群～学ぶ心・礼節の本源～ Kinsei Nihon no kyōiku isan-gun (manabu kokoro・reisetsu no hongen)		Okayama	Bizen	Former Shizutani School			Former Shizutani School; Kumazawa Banzan Residence Site; Well-field Site		Sekisai ceremony; Bizen Province Wake District Ida Village Nobehara Family Documents	
#001	Educational Heritage from Early-Modern Japan (1568–1868): The Origins of Academics and Decorum 近世日本の教育遺産群～学ぶ心・礼節の本源～ Kinsei Nihon no kyōiku isan-gun (manabu kokoro・reisetsu no hongen)		Ōita	Hita	Chōfuku-ji Hondō			Kangi-en Site (ja); Hirose Tansō Former Residence; Hirose Tansō's Grave	Hita City Mameda-machi (ja) Important Preservation District for Groups of Traditional Buildings	Keirin-en Site; Historical Materials relating to the Kangi-en	
#002	Kakaa Denka: The Silk Story of Gunma かかあ天下～ぐんまの絹物語～ Kakaa denka (Gunma no kinu monogatari)		Gunma	Nakanojō	Tomizawa Family Residence				Nakanojō Town Kuni Akaiwa (ja) Important Preservation District for Groups of Traditional Buildings		
#002	Kakaa Denka: The Silk Story of Gunma かかあ天下～ぐんまの絹物語～ Kakaa denka (Gunma no kinu monogatari)		Gunma	Katashina	Nagai Method (ja) Sericultural School Laboratory House					Portrait of Nagai Ito	
#002	Kakaa Denka: The Silk Story of Gunma かかあ天下～ぐんまの絹物語～ Kakaa denka (Gunma no kinu monogatari)		Gunma	Kanra	Former Obata-gumi Silk Production Brick Warehouse					Materials of Sericulture, Silk Reeling, Textiles in Kanra Town; Stone Monument of Kanra-sha Obata-gumi	
#002	Kakaa Denka: The Silk Story of Gunma かかあ天下～ぐんまの絹物語～ Kakaa denka (Gunma no kinu monogatari)		Gunma	Kiryū	Former Model Factory and Kiryū Nenshi Gōshi Gaisha Office Building				Kiryū City Kiryū Shinmachi (ja) Important Preservation District for Groups of Traditional Buildings; Gotō Orimono; Textile Museum “Yukari”; Kiryū Textile Hall Former Building (ja)	Shirataki Jinja (ja)	
#003	Takaoka, Town of Flourishing Folk Culture Under the Rule of the Maeda Family of Kaga: People, Technologies, Hearts and Minds 加賀前田家ゆかりの町民文化が花咲くまち高岡～人､技､心～ Kaga Maeda-ke yukari no chōmin bunka ga hanasaku machi Takaoka (hito, waza, kokoro)		Toyama	Takaoka	Zuiryū-ji; Gofuku-machi Shinmeisha (ja) Honden; Omoto-machi Shinmeisha Haiden; Official Autograph Letter of Maeda Toshinaga; Plan of Takaoka produced in Meiwa 8; Sugano Family Residence; Ikadai Family Residence; Dozōzukuri-no-Machi Shiryōkan (Former Murosaki Family Residence); Letter of Order (ja) of the Nin'an era; Letter from Maeda Toshinaga; Seated Bronze Statue of Amida Nyorai (ja); Toide Otaya (ja); Shōkō-ji (ja); Fushiki Kitamaebune Museum (Former Akimoto Family Residence)		Takaoka Mikurumayama festival floats (ja); Takaoka Mikurumayama festival; Wooden Form for a Dragon's Head on a Temple Bell; Manufacturing Techniques of Etchū Fukuoka Sedge-woven Hats	Maeda Tosinaga's Mausoleum; Takaoka Castle Site	Yamachō-Suji (ja) Important Preservation District for Groups of Traditional Buildings; Kanaya-machi (ja) Important Preservation District for Groups of Traditional Buildings; Ariso-shō Hachimangū (Honden, Fishing Pavilion, Haiden, Heiden); Takaoka Casting Tools and Ware (ja); Former Nanbu Foundry Cupola Furnace and Chimney (ja); Tanada Family Residence; Yoshimatsu Family Residence; Aritō Family Residence; Takaoka Chamber of Commerce and Industry Fushiki Branch; Fushiki Meteorological Museum (Former Fushiki Weather Station Building and Wind Measurement Tower) (ja); Maruya Family Residence; Sano Family Residence; Kiyoto Sake Brewery	Yoshibee Memorial Stele (Iya Susume Ushi no Mikoto Site); Goinsai (ja) festival; Fushiki Port (ja) (Fushiki Bay); Row of Sedge-woven Hat Ton'ya	
#004	The Noto Peninsula: Where the Light Dances 灯（あか）り舞う半島 能登－熱狂のキリコ祭り－ Akari mau hantō Noto (nekkyō no Kiriko matsuri)		Ishikawa	Anamizu					Noto Kiriko Matsuri (ja)	Okinami Tairyō Matsuri	
#004	The Noto Peninsula: Where the Light Dances 灯（あか）り舞う半島 能登－熱狂のキリコ祭り－ Akari mau hantō Noto (nekkyō no Kiriko matsuri)		Ishikawa	Nanao	Fujitsu Hiko Jinja (Fujitsu Hiko Jinja Honden)		Notojima Kōda Fire Festival (ja); Roppo Nōryō-sai (ja) (Roppo Osuzumi Matsuri); Shiotsu Kagari Love of Fire Festival (Shiotsu Osuzumi Matsuri); Shingo Nōryō-sai (ja) (Natauchi Osuzumi Matsuri)	Karashima Jinja Grasses and Machilus thunbergii Forest	Noto Kiriko Matsuri (ja)	Nanao Gion Matsuri (ja); Issaki Hōtō Matsuri (ja)	
#004	The Noto Peninsula: Where the Light Dances 灯（あか）り舞う半島 能登－熱狂のキリコ祭り－ Akari mau hantō Noto (nekkyō no Kiriko matsuri)		Ishikawa	Noto			Koiji Fire Festival; Abare Festival (Ushitsu Kiriko Matsuri)		Noto Kiriko Matsuri (ja)	Yanagida Taisai; Niwaka-sai; Matsunami Ningyō Kiriko Matsuri	
#004	The Noto Peninsula: Where the Light Dances 灯（あか）り舞う半島 能登－熱狂のキリコ祭り－ Akari mau hantō Noto (nekkyō no Kiriko matsuri)		Ishikawa	Shika					Noto Kiriko Matsuri (ja)	Togi Hassaku Sairei; Saikai Matsuri	
#004	The Noto Peninsula: Where the Light Dances 灯（あか）り舞う半島 能登－熱狂のキリコ祭り－ Akari mau hantō Noto (nekkyō no Kiriko matsuri)		Ishikawa	Suzu			Takojima Hayafune Kyōgen	Grasses at Suzu Jinja (ja)	Noto Kiriko Matsuri (ja)	Jike Kiriko Matsuri; Hōryū Tanabata Kiriko Matsuri (ja); Takojima Kiriko Matsuri	
#004	The Noto Peninsula: Where the Light Dances 灯（あか）り舞う半島 能登－熱狂のキリコ祭り－ Akari mau hantō Noto (nekkyō no Kiriko matsuri)		Ishikawa	Wajima			Minazuki Matsuri; Goshinji Daiko; Gojinjō Daiko (Wajima Nabune Gojinjō Daiko); Nakashimaya Daikiriko	Sosogi Coast (ja)	Noto Kiriko Matsuri (ja)	Wajima Taisai; Nabune Taisai; Sosogi Taisai	
#005	Wakasa Province: A Cultural Heritage Linking the Sea to the Ancient Capital 海と都をつなぐ若狭の往来文化遺産群～御食国（みけつくに）若狭と鯖街道～ Umi to miyako o tsunagu Wakasa no ōrai bunka isan-gun (miketsu-kuni Wakasa to saba kaidō)		Fukui	Mihama				Mikata Five Lakes			
#005	Wakasa Province: A Cultural Heritage Linking the Sea to the Ancient Capital 海と都をつなぐ若狭の往来文化遺産群～御食国（みけつくに）若狭と鯖街道～ Umi to miyako o tsunagu Wakasa no ōrai bunka isan-gun (miketsu-kuni Wakasa to saba kaidō)		Fukui	Obama				Remains of Okozu salt manufacturing facilities; Wakasa Kokubun-ji; Mantoku-ji			
#005	Wakasa Province: A Cultural Heritage Linking the Sea to the Ancient Capital 海と都をつなぐ若狭の往来文化遺産群～御食国（みけつくに）若狭と鯖街道～ Umi to miyako o tsunagu Wakasa no ōrai bunka isan-gun (miketsu-kuni Wakasa to saba kaidō)		Fukui	Wakasa				Wakibukuro Kofun-gun (Jōnozuka Kofun, Nishizuka Kofun, Nakatsuka Kofun); Hikasa Kofun-gun (Kamifunazuka Kofun, Shimofunazuka Kofun); Mikata Five Lakes			
#006	An Ancient Castle Town with the Spirit of Nobunaga’s Hospitality 「信長公のおもてなし」が息づく戦国城下町・岐阜 "Nobunaga-kō no omotenashi" ga ikizuku sengoku jōkamachi Gifu		Gifu	Gifu				Gifu Castle Site			
#007	Saikū: The Palace of Saiō - the Imperial Princess Prays 祈る皇女斎王のみやこ 斎宮 "Inoru kōjo saiō no miyako Saikū		Mie	Meiwa	Artefacts Excavated from the Saikū Site (collection of Saikū Historical Museum (ja))			Saikū Site; Site of Saiō Ononominato Purification Ceremony		Saiō Woods; Take Jinja; Harai River (ja); Monument at Takegawa no Hanazono; Grave of Princess Takako (ja); Ōyodo (ja); Narihira's Pine; Site of Sasafue Angū (temporary royal palace); Birthplace of Kakechikara offering	
#008	Lake Biwa and Its Surroundings: A Water Heritage Site of Life and Prayer 琵琶湖とその水辺景観～祈りと暮らしの水遺産～ Biwa-ko to sono mizu-be keikan (inori to kurashi no mizu isan)		Shiga	Higashiōmi	Townscape of Gokashō Kondō (ja) (Ōmi Merchant Houses)		Traditional Regional Dishes			Iba Waterside Sightseeing; Traditional Methods of Fishing	
#008	Lake Biwa and Its Surroundings: A Water Heritage Site of Life and Prayer 琵琶湖とその水辺景観～祈りと暮らしの水遺産～ Biwa-ko to sono mizu-be keikan (inori to kurashi no mizu isan)		Shiga	Hikone	Hikone Castle		Traditional Regional Dishes	Former Hikone Domain Matsubara Suburban Residence Gardens (Ohama Goten); Genkyū-en (ja) (Genkyū Rakuraku-en); Hikone Castle		Traditional Methods of Fishing	
#008	Lake Biwa and Its Surroundings: A Water Heritage Site of Life and Prayer 琵琶湖とその水辺景観～祈りと暮らしの水遺産～ Biwa-ko to sono mizu-be keikan (inori to kurashi no mizu isan)		Shiga	Maibara			Asahi Hōnen Taiko Odori Dance; Traditional Regional Dishes	Western Slope of Mount Ibuki; Nakasendō Samegai-juku	Nakasendō Samegai-juku; Higashikusano Mountain Village Sightseeing	Traditional Methods of Fishing	
#008	Lake Biwa and Its Surroundings: A Water Heritage Site of Life and Prayer 琵琶湖とその水辺景観～祈りと暮らしの水遺産～ Biwa-ko to sono mizu-be keikan (inori to kurashi no mizu isan)		Shiga	Nagahama	Chikubu-shima		Traditional Regional Dishes	Chikubu-shima	Scenery of the Sugaura Lakeshore Village (ja)	Traditional Methods of Fishing	
#008	Lake Biwa and Its Surroundings: A Water Heritage Site of Life and Prayer 琵琶湖とその水辺景観～祈りと暮らしの水遺産～ Biwa-ko to sono mizu-be keikan (inori to kurashi no mizu isan)		Shiga	Ōmihachiman	Chōmei-ji (ja); Isaki-ji (ja)		Traditional Regional Dishes		Waterways of Ōmi-Hachiman (ja)	Okishima (ja); Traditional Methods of Fishing	
#008	Lake Biwa and Its Surroundings: A Water Heritage Site of Life and Prayer 琵琶湖とその水辺景観～祈りと暮らしの水遺産～ Biwa-ko to sono mizu-be keikan (inori to kurashi no mizu isan)		Shiga	Ōtsu	Hieizan Enryaku-ji; Mii-dera (Onjō-ji); Hiyoshi Taisha; Saikyō-ji (ja); Ishiyama-dera		Traditional Regional Dishes	Hieizan Enryaku-ji; Ishiyama-dera	Saikyō-ji (ja)	Traditional Methods of Fishing	
#008	Lake Biwa and Its Surroundings: A Water Heritage Site of Life and Prayer 琵琶湖とその水辺景観～祈りと暮らしの水遺産～ Biwa-ko to sono mizu-be keikan (inori to kurashi no mizu isan)		Shiga	Takashima	Shirahige Jinja; Shikobuchi Faith		Traditional Regional Dishes		Shirahige Jinja; Kaizu, Nishihama & Chinai Waterside Sightseeing; Harie & Shimofuri Waterside Sightseeing; Ōmizo Waterside Sightseeing	Traditional Methods of Fishing	
#009	A Walk through the 800-year History of Japanese Tea 日本茶800年の歴史散歩; Nihon-cha 800-nen no rekishi sanpo		Kyōto	Jōyō							
#009	A Walk through the 800-year History of Japanese Tea 日本茶800年の歴史散歩; Nihon-cha 800-nen no rekishi sanpo		Kyōto	Kizugawa							
#009	A Walk through the 800-year History of Japanese Tea 日本茶800年の歴史散歩; Nihon-cha 800-nen no rekishi sanpo		Kyōto	Kyōtanabe							
#009	A Walk through the 800-year History of Japanese Tea 日本茶800年の歴史散歩; Nihon-cha 800-nen no rekishi sanpo		Kyōto	Minamiyamashiro							
#009	A Walk through the 800-year History of Japanese Tea 日本茶800年の歴史散歩; Nihon-cha 800-nen no rekishi sanpo		Kyōto	Uji							
#009	A Walk through the 800-year History of Japanese Tea 日本茶800年の歴史散歩; Nihon-cha 800-nen no rekishi sanpo		Kyōto	Ujitawara							
#009	A Walk through the 800-year History of Japanese Tea 日本茶800年の歴史散歩; Nihon-cha 800-nen no rekishi sanpo		Kyōto	Wazuka							
#009	A Walk through the 800-year History of Japanese Tea 日本茶800年の歴史散歩; Nihon-cha 800-nen no rekishi sanpo		Kyōto	Yawata							
#010	Dekansho-Bushi: Hometown Memories Passed Down in Folk Songs デカンショ節～民謡に乗せて歌い継ぐふるさとの記憶～ Dekansho-bushi (min'yō ni nosete utai tsugu furusato no kioku)		Hyōgo	Tamba-Sasayama							
#011	The Dawn of Japan: Women in the Asuka Period 日本国創成のとき～飛鳥を翔（かけ）た女性たち～ Nihon koku sōsei no toki (Asuka o kaketa josei-tachi)		Nara	Asuka	Takamatsuzuka Kofun Murals			Toyurano-miya Palace Site; Asuka Itabuki Palace Ruins; Asuka Inabuchi Palace Site (ja); Asuka Mizuochi Site (ja); Sakafune-ishi Ruins (ja) (Tortoise-Shaped Stone Structure); Asuka-kyō Enchi Ruins (ja); Asuka-dera; Kawara-dera Site; Kengoshizuka Kofun (ja) & Koshitsuka-Gomon Kofun (ja)	Asuka Kawakamini Imasu Usutaki Himenomikoto Shrine; Mebuchi Waterfall	Yamada-michi Road; Kiji Road (Koseji Road); Asuka River (ja); Taburegokorono-mizo Site; Ikazuchino-oka Tōhō Archaeological Site; Shimano-miya Palace Site; Ishigami Site (ja); Sakata-dera Site; Mausoleum (ja) of Emperor Kinmei; Mausoleum of Princess Kibihime (ja); Mausoleum (ja) of Emperor Tenmu and Empress Jitō; Imotōge Mountain Pass (ja); Namode-odori Dance	
#011	The Dawn of Japan: Women in the Asuka Period 日本国創成のとき～飛鳥を翔（かけ）た女性たち～ Nihon koku sōsei no toki (Asuka o kaketa josei-tachi)		Nara	Kashihara				Fujiwara Palace Site; Moto-Yakushi-ji Site (ja); Maruyama Kofun (ja); Ueyama Kofun (ja); Iwafune Megalith Kofun (ja); Kaguyama (Yamato Sanzan); Unebiyama (Yamato Sanzan); Miminashiyama (Yamato Sanzan)		Yoko-ōji Road (ja); Shimotsu-michi Road (ja); Nakatsu-michi Road; Yamada-michi Road; Kiji Road (Koseji Road); Uenotsu-Tamoto Jinja (ja); Fukada-ike Pond; Asuka River (ja); Taburegokorono-mizo Site	
#011	The Dawn of Japan: Women in the Asuka Period 日本国創成のとき～飛鳥を翔（かけ）た女性たち～ Nihon koku sōsei no toki (Asuka o kaketa josei-tachi)		Nara	Takatori	Saru-ishi (ja) (Monkey Stone) of Takatori Castle					Hatamikai Shrine; Mausoleum of Empress Saimei; Jintō-seki (headstone) of Kōei-ji	
#012	A Site for Purifying the Six Roots of Perception and Healing the Six Senses: Japan's Most Dangerous National Treasure and a World-Famous Radon Hot Spring 六根清浄と六感治癒の地～日本一危ない国宝鑑賞と世界屈指のラドン泉～ Rokkon shōjō to rokkan chiyū no chi (Nihon-ichi abunai kokuhō kanshō to sekai kusshi no radon izumi)		Tottori	Misasa							
#013	Tsuwano Then and Now: Exploring the Town of Tsuwano Through the One Hundred Landscapes of Tsuwano 津和野今昔～百景図を歩く～ Tsuwano konjaku (hyakkei-zu o aruku)		Shimane	Tsuwano							
#014	A Miniature Garden City from the Middle Ages Built Around the Onomichi Channel 尾道水道が紡いだ中世からの箱庭的都市; Onomichi suidō ga tsumuida chūsei kara no hakoniwa-teki toshi		Hiroshima	Onomichi							
#015	Henro:The Pilgrimage Route and 88 Temples of Shikoku 「四国遍路」～回遊型巡礼路と独自の巡礼文化～ "Shikoku henro" (kaiyū-gata junrei-ji to dokuji no junrei bunka)		Ehime								
#015	Henro:The Pilgrimage Route and 88 Temples of Shikoku 「四国遍路」～回遊型巡礼路と独自の巡礼文化～ "Shikoku henro" (kaiyū-gata junrei-ji to dokuji no junrei bunka)		Kagawa								
#015	Henro:The Pilgrimage Route and 88 Temples of Shikoku 「四国遍路」～回遊型巡礼路と独自の巡礼文化～ "Shikoku henro" (kaiyū-gata junrei-ji to dokuji no junrei bunka)		Kōchi								
#015	Henro:The Pilgrimage Route and 88 Temples of Shikoku 「四国遍路」～回遊型巡礼路と独自の巡礼文化～ "Shikoku henro" (kaiyū-gata junrei-ji to dokuji no junrei bunka)		Tokushima								
#016	The Western Capital of Ancient Japan: Exchange Hub with East Asia 古代日本の「西の都」～東アジアとの交流拠点～ Kodai Nihon no "nishi no miyako" (higashi Ajia to no kōryū kyoten)		Fukuoka	Chikushino				Mount Hōman; Kii Castle Ruins; Ashikisan Castle Ruins; Tōnoharutō Site; Mount Tenpai (ja)		Kandō; Suita-no-Yu (Futsukaichi Onsen (ja)); Sukizuka Haiji Site	
#016	The Western Capital of Ancient Japan: Exchange Hub with East Asia 古代日本の「西の都」～東アジアとの交流拠点～ Kodai Nihon no "nishi no miyako" (higashi Ajia to no kōryū kyoten)		Fukuoka	Dazaifu	Kanzeon-ji・Kaidan-in (Buildings, Sculptures, Craftworks); Bonshō; Dazaifu Tenmangū (Buildings, Writings); Archeological Location Site of the Mikasa and Oka Corps Seals (Archaeological Materials); Hannya-ji Ruins (ja) (Buildings)		Dazaifu Tenmangū Jinkō Event	Dazaifu Government Office Ruins; Ōno Castle Ruins; Mizuki Castle Ruins; Kanzeon-ji・Kaidan-in; Chikuzen Kokubun-ji (ja) Ruins; Dazaifu Gakkōin Site (ja); Kokubu Tile Kiln Site (ja); Mount Hōman; Hannya-ji Ruins (ja); Dazaifu Plum Blossoms; Ushikubi Sue Ware Kiln Site (ja)		Traditional Events of Dazaifu Tenmangū; Man'yōshū Tsukushi Kadan; Site of Dazaifu Jōbō (Grid-based City); Kandō; Archeological Location Site of the Mikasa and Oka Corps Seals; South Hall Site	
#016	The Western Capital of Ancient Japan: Exchange Hub with East Asia 古代日本の「西の都」～東アジアとの交流拠点～ Kodai Nihon no "nishi no miyako" (higashi Ajia to no kōryū kyoten)		Fukuoka	Kasuga				Mizuki Castle; Ushikubi Sue Ware Kiln Site (ja)			
#016	The Western Capital of Ancient Japan: Exchange Hub with East Asia 古代日本の「西の都」～東アジアとの交流拠点～ Kodai Nihon no "nishi no miyako" (higashi Ajia to no kōryū kyoten)		Fukuoka	Nakagawa						Sakuta no Unade (ja)	
#016	The Western Capital of Ancient Japan: Exchange Hub with East Asia 古代日本の「西の都」～東アジアとの交流拠点～ Kodai Nihon no "nishi no miyako" (higashi Ajia to no kōryū kyoten)		Fukuoka	Ōnojō	Sue Ware with Spatula-Incised Writing from the Ushikubi Sue Ware Kiln Site		Mikasa-no-Mori	Ōno Castle; Mizuki Castle; Ushikubi Sue Ware Kiln Site (ja); Mikasa-no-Mori; Zenichida Kofun Cluster		Man'yōshū Tsukushi Kadan; Kandō	
#016	The Western Capital of Ancient Japan: Exchange Hub with East Asia 古代日本の「西の都」～東アジアとの交流拠点～ Kodai Nihon no "nishi no miyako" (higashi Ajia to no kōryū kyoten)		Fukuoka	Umi				Ōno Castle		Man'yōshū Tsukushi Kadan	
#016	The Western Capital of Ancient Japan: Exchange Hub with East Asia 古代日本の「西の都」～東アジアとの交流拠点～ Kodai Nihon no "nishi no miyako" (higashi Ajia to no kōryū kyoten)		Saga	Kiyama				Kii Castle Ruins		Man'yōshū Tsukushi Kadan; Kandō	
#017	The Border Islands Iki, Tsushima, and Gotō: The Ancient Bridge to the Continent 国境の島 壱岐・対馬・五島～古代からの架け橋～ Kokkyō no shima Iki・Tsushima・Gotō (kodai kara no kakehashi)		Nagasaki	Gotō							
#017	The Border Islands Iki, Tsushima, and Gotō: The Ancient Bridge to the Continent 国境の島 壱岐・対馬・五島～古代からの架け橋～ Kokkyō no shima Iki・Tsushima・Gotō (kodai kara no kakehashi)		Nagasaki	Iki							
#017	The Border Islands Iki, Tsushima, and Gotō: The Ancient Bridge to the Continent 国境の島 壱岐・対馬・五島～古代からの架け橋～ Kokkyō no shima Iki・Tsushima・Gotō (kodai kara no kakehashi)		Nagasaki	Shin-Kamigotō							
#017	The Border Islands Iki, Tsushima, and Gotō: The Ancient Bridge to the Continent 国境の島 壱岐・対馬・五島～古代からの架け橋～ Kokkyō no shima Iki・Tsushima・Gotō (kodai kara no kakehashi)		Nagasaki	Tsushima							
#018	The Culture of Sagara Family: 700 Years of a Conservative Yet Innovative Spirit in one of Japan's Richest Remote Regions 相良700年が生んだ保守と進取の文化～日本でもっとも豊かな隠れ里―人吉球磨～ Sagara nanahyaku-nen ga unda hoshu to shinshu no bunka (Nihon de mottomo yutakana kakure-zato ― Hitoyoshi Kuma)		Kumamoto	Asagiri							
#018	The Culture of Sagara Family: 700 Years of a Conservative Yet Innovative Spirit in one of Japan's Richest Remote Regions 相良700年が生んだ保守と進取の文化～日本でもっとも豊かな隠れ里―人吉球磨～ Sagara nanahyaku-nen ga unda hoshu to shinshu no bunka (Nihon de mottomo yutakana kakure-zato ― Hitoyoshi Kuma)		Kumamoto	Hitoyoshi							
#018	The Culture of Sagara Family: 700 Years of a Conservative Yet Innovative Spirit in one of Japan's Richest Remote Regions 相良700年が生んだ保守と進取の文化～日本でもっとも豊かな隠れ里―人吉球磨～ Sagara nanahyaku-nen ga unda hoshu to shinshu no bunka (Nihon de mottomo yutakana kakure-zato ― Hitoyoshi Kuma)		Kumamoto	Itsuki							
#018	The Culture of Sagara Family: 700 Years of a Conservative Yet Innovative Spirit in one of Japan's Richest Remote Regions 相良700年が生んだ保守と進取の文化～日本でもっとも豊かな隠れ里―人吉球磨～ Sagara nanahyaku-nen ga unda hoshu to shinshu no bunka (Nihon de mottomo yutakana kakure-zato ― Hitoyoshi Kuma)		Kumamoto	Kuma							
#018	The Culture of Sagara Family: 700 Years of a Conservative Yet Innovative Spirit in one of Japan's Richest Remote Regions 相良700年が生んだ保守と進取の文化～日本でもっとも豊かな隠れ里―人吉球磨～ Sagara nanahyaku-nen ga unda hoshu to shinshu no bunka (Nihon de mottomo yutakana kakure-zato ― Hitoyoshi Kuma)		Kumamoto	Mizukami							
#018	The Culture of Sagara Family: 700 Years of a Conservative Yet Innovative Spirit in one of Japan's Richest Remote Regions 相良700年が生んだ保守と進取の文化～日本でもっとも豊かな隠れ里―人吉球磨～ Sagara nanahyaku-nen ga unda hoshu to shinshu no bunka (Nihon de mottomo yutakana kakure-zato ― Hitoyoshi Kuma)		Kumamoto	Nishiki							
#018	The Culture of Sagara Family: 700 Years of a Conservative Yet Innovative Spirit in one of Japan's Richest Remote Regions 相良700年が生んだ保守と進取の文化～日本でもっとも豊かな隠れ里―人吉球磨～ Sagara nanahyaku-nen ga unda hoshu to shinshu no bunka (Nihon de mottomo yutakana kakure-zato ― Hitoyoshi Kuma)		Kumamoto	Sagara							
#018	The Culture of Sagara Family: 700 Years of a Conservative Yet Innovative Spirit in one of Japan's Richest Remote Regions 相良700年が生んだ保守と進取の文化～日本でもっとも豊かな隠れ里―人吉球磨～ Sagara nanahyaku-nen ga unda hoshu to shinshu no bunka (Nihon de mottomo yutakana kakure-zato ― Hitoyoshi Kuma)		Kumamoto	Taragi							
#018	The Culture of Sagara Family: 700 Years of a Conservative Yet Innovative Spirit in one of Japan's Richest Remote Regions 相良700年が生んだ保守と進取の文化～日本でもっとも豊かな隠れ里―人吉球磨～ Sagara nanahyaku-nen ga unda hoshu to shinshu no bunka (Nihon de mottomo yutakana kakure-zato ― Hitoyoshi Kuma)		Kumamoto	Yamae							
#018	The Culture of Sagara Family: 700 Years of a Conservative Yet Innovative Spirit in one of Japan's Richest Remote Regions 相良700年が生んだ保守と進取の文化～日本でもっとも豊かな隠れ里―人吉球磨～ Sagara nanahyaku-nen ga unda hoshu to shinshu no bunka (Nihon de mottomo yutakana kakure-zato ― Hitoyoshi Kuma)		Kumamoto	Yunomae							
#019	The "DATE Culture" Fostered by Masamune 政宗が育んだ"伊達"な文化; Masamune ga hagukunda "Date"na bunka		Miyagi	Matsushima							
#019	The "DATE Culture" Fostered by Masamune 政宗が育んだ"伊達"な文化; Masamune ga hagukunda "Date"na bunka		Miyagi	Sendai							
#019	The "DATE Culture" Fostered by Masamune 政宗が育んだ"伊達"な文化; Masamune ga hagukunda "Date"na bunka		Miyagi	Shiogama							
#019	The "DATE Culture" Fostered by Masamune 政宗が育んだ"伊達"な文化; Masamune ga hagukunda "Date"na bunka		Miyagi	Tagajō							
#020	A Journey to Rebirth Amid the Sacred Nature of Dewa Sanzan 自然と信仰が息づく『生まれかわりの旅』～樹齢300年を超える杉並木につつまれた2,446段の石段から始まる出羽三山～ Shizen to shinkō ga ikizuku "umare kawari no tabi" (jurei sanbyaku-nen o koeru suginami ki ni tsutsumareta 2, 446-dan no ishidan kara hajimaru Dewa Sanzan)		Yamagata	Nishikawa							
#020	A Journey to Rebirth Amid the Sacred Nature of Dewa Sanzan 自然と信仰が息づく『生まれかわりの旅』～樹齢300年を超える杉並木につつまれた2,446段の石段から始まる出羽三山～ Shizen to shinkō ga ikizuku "umare kawari no tabi" (jurei sanbyaku-nen o koeru suginami ki ni tsutsumareta 2, 446-dan no ishidan kara hajimaru Dewa Sanzan)		Yamagata	Shōnai							
#020	A Journey to Rebirth Amid the Sacred Nature of Dewa Sanzan 自然と信仰が息づく『生まれかわりの旅』～樹齢300年を超える杉並木につつまれた2,446段の石段から始まる出羽三山～ Shizen to shinkō ga ikizuku "umare kawari no tabi" (jurei sanbyaku-nen o koeru suginami ki ni tsutsumareta 2, 446-dan no ishidan kara hajimaru Dewa Sanzan)		Yamagata	Tsuruoka							
#021	Visiting 33 Kannon in Aizu: Witnessing Old Aizu Culture Through Pilgrimage 会津の三十三観音めぐり～巡礼を通して観た往時の会津の文化～ Aizu no sanjūsan Kannon meguri (junrei o tōshite mita ōji no Aizu no bunka)		Fukushima								
#022	The Canal That Ensured the Future of Asaka: Ōkubo Toshimichi’s Last Dream and the Footprints of a Pioneer 未来を拓いた「一本の水路」～大久保利通“最期の夢”と開拓者の軌跡 郡山・猪苗代～ Mirai o hiraita "Ippon no suiro" (Ōkubo Toshimichi "saigo no yume" to kaitaku-sha no kiseki Kōriyama・Inawashiro)		Fukushima	Inawashiro							
#022	The Canal That Ensured the Future of Asaka: Ōkubo Toshimichi’s Last Dream and the Footprints of a Pioneer 未来を拓いた「一本の水路」～大久保利通“最期の夢”と開拓者の軌跡 郡山・猪苗代～ Mirai o hiraita "Ippon no suiro" (Ōkubo Toshimichi "saigo no yume" to kaitaku-sha no kiseki Kōriyama・Inawashiro)		Fukushima	Kōriyama							
#023	An Edo Travelogue of Cities in Northern Chiba (Hokusō): Four Cities That Supported the Mega-City of Edo 北総四都市江戸紀行・江戸を感じる北総の町並み～佐倉・成田・佐原・銚子：百万都市江戸を支えた江戸近郊の四つの代表的町並み群～ Hokusō shi toshi Edo kikō・Edo o kanjiru hokusō no machi-nami (Sakura・Narita・Sawara・Chōshi: hyakuman toshi Edo o sasaeta Edo kinkō no yottsu no daihyō-teki machi-nami-gun)		Chiba	Chōshi							
#023	An Edo Travelogue of Cities in Northern Chiba (Hokusō): Four Cities That Supported the Mega-City of Edo 北総四都市江戸紀行・江戸を感じる北総の町並み～佐倉・成田・佐原・銚子：百万都市江戸を支えた江戸近郊の四つの代表的町並み群～ Hokusō shi toshi Edo kikō・Edo o kanjiru hokusō no machi-nami (Sakura・Narita・Sawara・Chōshi: hyakuman toshi Edo o sasaeta Edo kinkō no yottsu no daihyō-teki machi-nami-gun)		Chiba	Katori							
#023	An Edo Travelogue of Cities in Northern Chiba (Hokusō): Four Cities That Supported the Mega-City of Edo 北総四都市江戸紀行・江戸を感じる北総の町並み～佐倉・成田・佐原・銚子：百万都市江戸を支えた江戸近郊の四つの代表的町並み群～ Hokusō shi toshi Edo kikō・Edo o kanjiru hokusō no machi-nami (Sakura・Narita・Sawara・Chōshi: hyakuman toshi Edo o sasaeta Edo kinkō no yottsu no daihyō-teki machi-nami-gun)		Chiba	Narita							
#023	An Edo Travelogue of Cities in Northern Chiba (Hokusō): Four Cities That Supported the Mega-City of Edo 北総四都市江戸紀行・江戸を感じる北総の町並み～佐倉・成田・佐原・銚子：百万都市江戸を支えた江戸近郊の四つの代表的町並み群～ Hokusō shi toshi Edo kikō・Edo o kanjiru hokusō no machi-nami (Sakura・Narita・Sawara・Chōshi: hyakuman toshi Edo o sasaeta Edo kinkō no yottsu no daihyō-teki machi-nami-gun)		Chiba	Sakura							
#024	Isehara City and the Mt. Ōyama Pilgrimage: Destination for the Faith and Leisure of Edo’s Commoners 江戸庶民の信仰と行楽の地～巨大な木太刀を担いで「大山詣り」～ Edo shomin no shinkō to kōraku no chi (kyodaina kidachi o katsuide "Ōyama-mairi")		Kanagawa	Isehara							
#025	Kamakura: A Historical and Cultural Mosaic 「いざ，鎌倉」～歴史と文化が描くモザイク画のまちへ～ "Iza, Kamakura" (rekishi to bunka ga kaku mozaiku-ga no machi e)		Kanagawa	Kamakura							
#026	Kaengata Doki Jōmon Pottery and the Snow Country Culture of the Shinano River Basin 「なんだ，コレは！」 信濃川流域の火焔型土器と雪国の文化 "Nanda, kore wa!" Shinano-gawa ryūiki no kaengata doki to yukiguni no bunka		Niigata	Nagaoka							
#026	Kaengata Doki Jōmon Pottery and the Snow Country Culture of the Shinano River Basin 「なんだ，コレは！」 信濃川流域の火焔型土器と雪国の文化 "Nanda, kore wa!" Shinano-gawa ryūiki no kaengata doki to yukiguni no bunka		Niigata	Niigata							
#026	Kaengata Doki Jōmon Pottery and the Snow Country Culture of the Shinano River Basin 「なんだ，コレは！」 信濃川流域の火焔型土器と雪国の文化 "Nanda, kore wa!" Shinano-gawa ryūiki no kaengata doki to yukiguni no bunka		Niigata	Sanjō							
#026	Kaengata Doki Jōmon Pottery and the Snow Country Culture of the Shinano River Basin 「なんだ，コレは！」 信濃川流域の火焔型土器と雪国の文化 "Nanda, kore wa!" Shinano-gawa ryūiki no kaengata doki to yukiguni no bunka		Niigata	Tōkamachi							
#026	Kaengata Doki Jōmon Pottery and the Snow Country Culture of the Shinano River Basin 「なんだ，コレは！」 信濃川流域の火焔型土器と雪国の文化 "Nanda, kore wa!" Shinano-gawa ryūiki no kaengata doki to yukiguni no bunka		Niigata	Tsunan							
#026	Kaengata Doki Jōmon Pottery and the Snow Country Culture of the Shinano River Basin 「なんだ，コレは！」 信濃川流域の火焔型土器と雪国の文化 "Nanda, kore wa!" Shinano-gawa ryūiki no kaengata doki to yukiguni no bunka		Niigata	Uonuma							
#027	Komatsu City and Its Culture of Stones: the Narrative of Gems 『珠玉と歩む物語』小松～時の流れの中で磨き上げた石の文化～ "Shugyoku to ayumu monogatari" Komatsu (toki no nagare no naka de migakiageta ishi no bunka)		Ishikawa	Komatsu							
#028	The Old Trade Route of Kisoji: Preserver of the Mountain and Survivor of Time 木曽路はすべて山の中～山を守り 山に生きる～ Kisoji wa subete yama no naka (yama o mamori yama ni ikiru)		Nagano	Agematsu							
#028	The Old Trade Route of Kisoji: Preserver of the Mountain and Survivor of Time 木曽路はすべて山の中～山を守り 山に生きる～ Kisoji wa subete yama no naka (yama o mamori yama ni ikiru)		Nagano	Kiso							
#028	The Old Trade Route of Kisoji: Preserver of the Mountain and Survivor of Time 木曽路はすべて山の中～山を守り 山に生きる～ Kisoji wa subete yama no naka (yama o mamori yama ni ikiru)		Nagano	Kiso							
#028	The Old Trade Route of Kisoji: Preserver of the Mountain and Survivor of Time 木曽路はすべて山の中～山を守り 山に生きる～ Kisoji wa subete yama no naka (yama o mamori yama ni ikiru)		Nagano	Nagiso							
#028	The Old Trade Route of Kisoji: Preserver of the Mountain and Survivor of Time 木曽路はすべて山の中～山を守り 山に生きる～ Kisoji wa subete yama no naka (yama o mamori yama ni ikiru)		Nagano	Ōtaki							
#028	The Old Trade Route of Kisoji: Preserver of the Mountain and Survivor of Time 木曽路はすべて山の中～山を守り 山に生きる～ Kisoji wa subete yama no naka (yama o mamori yama ni ikiru)		Nagano	Ōkuwa							
#028	The Old Trade Route of Kisoji: Preserver of the Mountain and Survivor of Time 木曽路はすべて山の中～山を守り 山に生きる～ Kisoji wa subete yama no naka (yama o mamori yama ni ikiru)		Nagano	Shiojiri							
#029	Hida Takayama's Wood Artisans: 1300 Year-Old Lineage of Skill and Spirit 飛騨匠の技・こころ～木とともに，今に引き継ぐ1300年～ Hida takumi no waza・kokoro (ki to tomoni, ima ni hikitsugu sen sanbyaku-nen)		Gifu	Takayama							
#030	Awaji Island: Creation of Japan's First Island and the People of the Sea 『古事記』の冒頭を飾る「国生みの島・淡路」～古代国家を支えた海人の営み～ "Kojiki" no bōtō o kazaru "Kuni umi no shima Awaji" (kodai kokka o sasaeta ama no itonami)		Hyōgo	Awaji							
#030	Awaji Island: Creation of Japan's First Island and the People of the Sea 『古事記』の冒頭を飾る「国生みの島・淡路」～古代国家を支えた海人の営み～ "Kojiki" no bōtō o kazaru "Kuni umi no shima Awaji" (kodai kokka o sasaeta ama no itonami)		Hyōgo	Minamiawaji							
#030	Awaji Island: Creation of Japan's First Island and the People of the Sea 『古事記』の冒頭を飾る「国生みの島・淡路」～古代国家を支えた海人の営み～ "Kojiki" no bōtō o kazaru "Kuni umi no shima Awaji" (kodai kokka o sasaeta ama no itonami)		Hyōgo	Sumoto							
#031	Yoshino, Birthplace of Japanese Afforestation: the Mutual Relationship Between People and Forest 森に育まれ，森を育んだ人々の暮らしとこころ～美林連なる造林発祥の地“吉野”～ Mori ni hagukumare, mori o hagukunda hitobito no kurashi to kokoro (mirin tsuranaru zōrin hasshō no chi "Yoshino")		Nara	Higashiyoshino							
#031	Yoshino, Birthplace of Japanese Afforestation: the Mutual Relationship Between People and Forest 森に育まれ，森を育んだ人々の暮らしとこころ～美林連なる造林発祥の地“吉野”～ Mori ni hagukumare, mori o hagukunda hitobito no kurashi to kokoro (mirin tsuranaru zōrin hasshō no chi "Yoshino")		Nara	Kamikitayama							
#031	Yoshino, Birthplace of Japanese Afforestation: the Mutual Relationship Between People and Forest 森に育まれ，森を育んだ人々の暮らしとこころ～美林連なる造林発祥の地“吉野”～ Mori ni hagukumare, mori o hagukunda hitobito no kurashi to kokoro (mirin tsuranaru zōrin hasshō no chi "Yoshino")		Nara	Kawakami							
#031	Yoshino, Birthplace of Japanese Afforestation: the Mutual Relationship Between People and Forest 森に育まれ，森を育んだ人々の暮らしとこころ～美林連なる造林発祥の地“吉野”～ Mori ni hagukumare, mori o hagukunda hitobito no kurashi to kokoro (mirin tsuranaru zōrin hasshō no chi "Yoshino")		Nara	Kurotaki							
#031	Yoshino, Birthplace of Japanese Afforestation: the Mutual Relationship Between People and Forest 森に育まれ，森を育んだ人々の暮らしとこころ～美林連なる造林発祥の地“吉野”～ Mori ni hagukumare, mori o hagukunda hitobito no kurashi to kokoro (mirin tsuranaru zōrin hasshō no chi "Yoshino")		Nara	Shimoichi							
#031	Yoshino, Birthplace of Japanese Afforestation: the Mutual Relationship Between People and Forest 森に育まれ，森を育んだ人々の暮らしとこころ～美林連なる造林発祥の地“吉野”～ Mori ni hagukumare, mori o hagukunda hitobito no kurashi to kokoro (mirin tsuranaru zōrin hasshō no chi "Yoshino")		Nara	Shimokitayama							
#031	Yoshino, Birthplace of Japanese Afforestation: the Mutual Relationship Between People and Forest 森に育まれ，森を育んだ人々の暮らしとこころ～美林連なる造林発祥の地“吉野”～ Mori ni hagukumare, mori o hagukunda hitobito no kurashi to kokoro (mirin tsuranaru zōrin hasshō no chi "Yoshino")		Nara	Tenkawa							
#031	Yoshino, Birthplace of Japanese Afforestation: the Mutual Relationship Between People and Forest 森に育まれ，森を育んだ人々の暮らしとこころ～美林連なる造林発祥の地“吉野”～ Mori ni hagukumare, mori o hagukunda hitobito no kurashi to kokoro (mirin tsuranaru zōrin hasshō no chi "Yoshino")		Nara	Yoshino							
#032	Living with whales 鯨とともに生きる; Kujira to tomoni ikiru		Wakayama	Kushimoto			Mifune Sacred Boat Ritual, Kochi Matsuri Festival	Kuroshima		Cape Shionomisaki Lookout	
#032	Living with whales 鯨とともに生きる; Kujira to tomoni ikiru		Wakayama	Nachikatsuura						Seiganto-ji Fish Memorial; Shiogama Jinja Semi Right Whale Ritual; Hamanomiya Shrine Archery Ritual	
#032	Living with whales 鯨とともに生きる; Kujira to tomoni ikiru		Wakayama	Shingū			Miwasaki Whale Dance			Harpooners’ Stone Shrine; Whale Lookout	
#032	Living with whales 鯨とともに生きる; Kujira to tomoni ikiru		Wakayama	Taiji	Asuka Jinja		Taiji Whale Dance	Gravesite of Yorimoto Wada Whaling Founder; Whale Memorial; Lookout Rest House Site; Smoke Signal Site; Takatsuka Lookout Site		Tōmyōsaki Lighthouse Site; Tōmyōsaki Lookout Site; Sekimon (Rock Gate)	
#033	Daisen Gyūba Ichi: Japan's Largest Alivestock Market Born of Jizo Bodhisattva Worship 地蔵信仰が育んだ日本最大の大山牛馬市; Jizō shinkō ga hagukunda Nihon saidai no Daisen gyūbaichi		Tottori	Daisen							
#033	Daisen Gyūba Ichi: Japan's Largest Alivestock Market Born of Jizo Bodhisattva Worship 地蔵信仰が育んだ日本最大の大山牛馬市; Jizō shinkō ga hagukunda Nihon saidai no Daisen gyūbaichi		Tottori	Hōki							
#033	Daisen Gyūba Ichi: Japan's Largest Alivestock Market Born of Jizo Bodhisattva Worship 地蔵信仰が育んだ日本最大の大山牛馬市; Jizō shinkō ga hagukunda Nihon saidai no Daisen gyūbaichi		Tottori	Kōfu							
#033	Daisen Gyūba Ichi: Japan's Largest Alivestock Market Born of Jizo Bodhisattva Worship 地蔵信仰が育んだ日本最大の大山牛馬市; Jizō shinkō ga hagukunda Nihon saidai no Daisen gyūbaichi		Tottori	Yonago							
#034	Izumo Tatara Chronicle: A Thousand Years of Iron 出雲國たたら風土記～鉄づくり千年が生んだ物語～ Izumo-no-kuni tatara fudoki (tetsu-zukuri chitose ga unda monogatari)		Shimane	Okuizumo							
#034	Izumo Tatara Chronicle: A Thousand Years of Iron 出雲國たたら風土記～鉄づくり千年が生んだ物語～ Izumo-no-kuni tatara fudoki (tetsu-zukuri chitose ga unda monogatari)		Shimane	Unnan							
#034	Izumo Tatara Chronicle: A Thousand Years of Iron 出雲國たたら風土記～鉄づくり千年が生んだ物語～ Izumo-no-kuni tatara fudoki (tetsu-zukuri chitose ga unda monogatari)		Shimane	Yasugi							
#035	The Four Dynamic Coastal Cities of Yokosuka, Kure, Sasebo, and Maizuru: Centers of Japanese Modernization 鎮守府 横須賀・呉・佐世保・舞鶴～日本近代化の躍動を体感できるまち～ Chinjufu Yokosuka・Kure・Sasebo・Maizuru (Nihon kindaika no yakudō o taikan dekiru machi)		Kanagawa	Yokosuka							
#035	The Four Dynamic Coastal Cities of Yokosuka, Kure, Sasebo, and Maizuru: Centers of Japanese Modernization 鎮守府 横須賀・呉・佐世保・舞鶴～日本近代化の躍動を体感できるまち～ Chinjufu Yokosuka・Kure・Sasebo・Maizuru (Nihon kindaika no yakudō o taikan dekiru machi)		Hiroshima	Kure							
#035	The Four Dynamic Coastal Cities of Yokosuka, Kure, Sasebo, and Maizuru: Centers of Japanese Modernization 鎮守府 横須賀・呉・佐世保・舞鶴～日本近代化の躍動を体感できるまち～ Chinjufu Yokosuka・Kure・Sasebo・Maizuru (Nihon kindaika no yakudō o taikan dekiru machi)		Nagasaki	Sasebo							
#035	The Four Dynamic Coastal Cities of Yokosuka, Kure, Sasebo, and Maizuru: Centers of Japanese Modernization 鎮守府 横須賀・呉・佐世保・舞鶴～日本近代化の躍動を体感できるまち～ Chinjufu Yokosuka・Kure・Sasebo・Maizuru (Nihon kindaika no yakudō o taikan dekiru machi)		Kyōto	Maizuru							
#036	Murakami Kaizoku: Japan's Largest "Pirate" Group and their Territory in the Geiyo Archipelago "日本最大の海賊"の本拠地：芸予諸島～よみがえる村上海賊"Murakami KAIZOKU"の記憶～ "Nihon saidai no kaizoku" no honkyochi: Geiyo shotō (yomigaeru Murakami kaizoku "Murakami KAIZOKU" no kioku)		Hiroshima	Onomichi	Materials of the Innoshima Murakami Family; Jōdo-ji Hōkyōintō; Kōmyō-ji (ja) Namiwake Kannon; Kōjō-ji (ja) Three-Storey Pagoda		Mukunoura Sacred Dance (ja)	Innoshima Murakami Family Graves; Aoki Castle (ja) Site; Aokage Castle Site; Nagasaki Castle Site; Shirataki-yama 500 Arhats; Jizō-bana; Mikasaki Castle Site; Narutakiyama Castle Site	Hyōtan-jima (ja)	Okajima Castle Site; Yosaki Castle Site; Tawarasaki Castle Site; Momoshima (ja) Chausuyama Castle Site; Hōraku ware; Suigun-nabe (ja)	
#036	Murakami Kaizoku: Japan's Largest "Pirate" Group and their Territory in the Geiyo Archipelago "日本最大の海賊"の本拠地：芸予諸島～よみがえる村上海賊"Murakami KAIZOKU"の記憶～ "Nihon saidai no kaizoku" no honkyochi: Geiyo shotō (yomigaeru Murakami kaizoku "Murakami KAIZOKU" no kioku)		Ehime	Imabari	Cultural Properties at Ōyamazumi Jinja; Ōyamazumi Jinja Poems for the Gods; Tomonoura Zenpuku-ji Hōkyōintō and other nearby cultural assets from the Middle Ages; Bekku Ōyamazumi Jinja (ja) Haiden; Kōrin-ji (ja) Documents; Jōzen-ji and Noma Jinja (ja) Stone Pagodas			Ōmishima Island; Cultural Properties at Ōyamazumi Jinja; Amazaki Castle (ja) Site; Grave of Murakami Masafusa & Zenkō-ji; Noshima Castle Site; Materials of the Murakamis of Noshima; Koga-yashiki Site and other nearby historical sites related to the Murakami Kaizoku; Yawata-yama; Hashima (ja); Shishimagahara; Imabari Castle Site; Keshima Castle Site	Hyōtan-jima (ja)	Murakami Yoshitsugu Tombstone & Myōkō-ji; Michikajima (ja); Murakami Yoshihiro (ja) Grave & Kōryū-ji; Mushi Castle Site & Nakato Castle Site; Kurushima Castle (ja) Site; Ōhama Hachiman Shrine (ja); Kokubusan Castle Site; Hōraku ware; Suigun-nabe (ja)	
#037	The Ceramics of Hizen: Birthplace of Japanese Porcelain Ware 日本磁器のふるさと 肥前～百花繚乱のやきもの散歩～ Nihon jiki no furusato Hizen (hyakka ryōran no yakimono sanpo)		Saga	Arita							
#037	The Ceramics of Hizen: Birthplace of Japanese Porcelain Ware 日本磁器のふるさと 肥前～百花繚乱のやきもの散歩～ Nihon jiki no furusato Hizen (hyakka ryōran no yakimono sanpo)		Saga	Imari							
#037	The Ceramics of Hizen: Birthplace of Japanese Porcelain Ware 日本磁器のふるさと 肥前～百花繚乱のやきもの散歩～ Nihon jiki no furusato Hizen (hyakka ryōran no yakimono sanpo)		Saga	Karatsu							
#037	The Ceramics of Hizen: Birthplace of Japanese Porcelain Ware 日本磁器のふるさと 肥前～百花繚乱のやきもの散歩～ Nihon jiki no furusato Hizen (hyakka ryōran no yakimono sanpo)		Saga	Takeo							
#037	The Ceramics of Hizen: Birthplace of Japanese Porcelain Ware 日本磁器のふるさと 肥前～百花繚乱のやきもの散歩～ Nihon jiki no furusato Hizen (hyakka ryōran no yakimono sanpo)		Saga	Ureshino							
#037	The Ceramics of Hizen: Birthplace of Japanese Porcelain Ware 日本磁器のふるさと 肥前～百花繚乱のやきもの散歩～ Nihon jiki no furusato Hizen (hyakka ryōran no yakimono sanpo)		Nagasaki	Hasami							
#037	The Ceramics of Hizen: Birthplace of Japanese Porcelain Ware 日本磁器のふるさと 肥前～百花繚乱のやきもの散歩～ Nihon jiki no furusato Hizen (hyakka ryōran no yakimono sanpo)		Nagasaki	Hirado							
#037	The Ceramics of Hizen: Birthplace of Japanese Porcelain Ware 日本磁器のふるさと 肥前～百花繚乱のやきもの散歩～ Nihon jiki no furusato Hizen (hyakka ryōran no yakimono sanpo)		Nagasaki	Sasebo							
#038	Even Edo is not as busy as Esashi in May: The town made prosperous by herring 江差の五月は江戸にもない～ニシンの繁栄が息づく町～ Esashi no gogatsu wa Edo ni mo nai (nishin no hanei ga ikizuku machi)		Hokkaidō	Esashi							
#039	The Kitamae-Bune Sea Routes: Ports and Residences Built on the Dreams of Brave Seafarers 荒波を越えた男たちの夢が紡いだ異空間～北前船寄港地・船主集落～ Aranami o koeta otoko-tachi no yume ga tsumuida i kūkan (kitamaebune kikō-chi・senshu shūraku)		Hokkaidō	Hakodate				Hakodate Bugyō's Office Site		Mount Hakodate; Itsukushima Jinja; Takadaya Residence Site; Takadaya Head Office Site	
#039	The Kitamae-Bune Sea Routes: Ports and Residences Built on the Dreams of Brave Seafarers 荒波を越えた男たちの夢が紡いだ異空間～北前船寄港地・船主集落～ Aranami o koeta otoko-tachi no yume ga tsumuida i kūkan (kitamaebune kikō-chi・senshu shūraku)		Hokkaidō	Ishikari	Former Nagano Store; Former Shiratori Banya (Ishikari City Hamamasu Folk Museum)					Kotan Jinja (ja) Mikoshi; Kindaitei (ja); Atsuta Jinja (ja) Ema Depicting Ships; Ishikari Hachiman Jinja (ja) Torii; Ishikari Benten Shrine (ja) Komainu; Ishikari Okiage Song	
#039	The Kitamae-Bune Sea Routes: Ports and Residences Built on the Dreams of Brave Seafarers 荒波を越えた男たちの夢が紡いだ異空間～北前船寄港地・船主集落～ Aranami o koeta otoko-tachi no yume ga tsumuida i kūkan (kitamaebune kikō-chi・senshu shūraku)		Hokkaidō	Matsumae	Matsumae Byōbu; Matsumoto Family Storehouse and Materials; Ryūun-in		Matsumae Okiage Song; Ema (Shinto) of a Shipwreck; Matsumae Gion Bayashi	Matsumae Han Matsumae Clan Graves		Fukuyama Wharf; Okiguchi Government Office Site; Fukuyama Castle Town Site	
#039	The Kitamae-Bune Sea Routes: Ports and Residences Built on the Dreams of Brave Seafarers 荒波を越えた男たちの夢が紡いだ異空間～北前船寄港地・船主集落～ Aranami o koeta otoko-tachi no yume ga tsumuida i kūkan (kitamaebune kikō-chi・senshu shūraku)		Hokkaidō	Otaru						Hiyori-yama; Former Kitahama District Warehouses (Former Ukon Warehouse, Former Hiroumi Warehouse, Former Masuda Warehouse, Former Ōie Warehouse, Former Otaru Warehouse); Former Kaiyōtei; Votive Offerings at Sumiyoshi Jinja (First Torii, Chōzubachi), Ema Depicting Ships (Ebisu Jinja, Ryūtoku-ji (ja) Kompira-den); Old Photographs Relating to the Kitamaebune; Nishikawa Family Documents	
#039	The Kitamae-Bune Sea Routes: Ports and Residences Built on the Dreams of Brave Seafarers 荒波を越えた男たちの夢が紡いだ異空間～北前船寄港地・船主集落～ Aranami o koeta otoko-tachi no yume ga tsumuida i kūkan (kitamaebune kikō-chi・senshu shūraku)		Aomori	Ajigasawa							
#039	The Kitamae-Bune Sea Routes: Ports and Residences Built on the Dreams of Brave Seafarers 荒波を越えた男たちの夢が紡いだ異空間～北前船寄港地・船主集落～ Aranami o koeta otoko-tachi no yume ga tsumuida i kūkan (kitamaebune kikō-chi・senshu shūraku)		Aomori	Fukaura							
#039	The Kitamae-Bune Sea Routes: Ports and Residences Built on the Dreams of Brave Seafarers 荒波を越えた男たちの夢が紡いだ異空間～北前船寄港地・船主集落～ Aranami o koeta otoko-tachi no yume ga tsumuida i kūkan (kitamaebune kikō-chi・senshu shūraku)		Aomori	Noheji							
#039	The Kitamae-Bune Sea Routes: Ports and Residences Built on the Dreams of Brave Seafarers 荒波を越えた男たちの夢が紡いだ異空間～北前船寄港地・船主集落～ Aranami o koeta otoko-tachi no yume ga tsumuida i kūkan (kitamaebune kikō-chi・senshu shūraku)		Akita	Akita							
#039	The Kitamae-Bune Sea Routes: Ports and Residences Built on the Dreams of Brave Seafarers 荒波を越えた男たちの夢が紡いだ異空間～北前船寄港地・船主集落～ Aranami o koeta otoko-tachi no yume ga tsumuida i kūkan (kitamaebune kikō-chi・senshu shūraku)		Akita	Nikaho							
#039	The Kitamae-Bune Sea Routes: Ports and Residences Built on the Dreams of Brave Seafarers 荒波を越えた男たちの夢が紡いだ異空間～北前船寄港地・船主集落～ Aranami o koeta otoko-tachi no yume ga tsumuida i kūkan (kitamaebune kikō-chi・senshu shūraku)		Akita	Noshiro							
#039	The Kitamae-Bune Sea Routes: Ports and Residences Built on the Dreams of Brave Seafarers 荒波を越えた男たちの夢が紡いだ異空間～北前船寄港地・船主集落～ Aranami o koeta otoko-tachi no yume ga tsumuida i kūkan (kitamaebune kikō-chi・senshu shūraku)		Akita	Oga							
#039	The Kitamae-Bune Sea Routes: Ports and Residences Built on the Dreams of Brave Seafarers 荒波を越えた男たちの夢が紡いだ異空間～北前船寄港地・船主集落～ Aranami o koeta otoko-tachi no yume ga tsumuida i kūkan (kitamaebune kikō-chi・senshu shūraku)		Akita	Yurihonjō							
#039	The Kitamae-Bune Sea Routes: Ports and Residences Built on the Dreams of Brave Seafarers 荒波を越えた男たちの夢が紡いだ異空間～北前船寄港地・船主集落～ Aranami o koeta otoko-tachi no yume ga tsumuida i kūkan (kitamaebune kikō-chi・senshu shūraku)		Yamagata	Sakata							
#039	The Kitamae-Bune Sea Routes: Ports and Residences Built on the Dreams of Brave Seafarers 荒波を越えた男たちの夢が紡いだ異空間～北前船寄港地・船主集落～ Aranami o koeta otoko-tachi no yume ga tsumuida i kūkan (kitamaebune kikō-chi・senshu shūraku)		Yamagata	Tsuruoka							
#039	The Kitamae-Bune Sea Routes: Ports and Residences Built on the Dreams of Brave Seafarers 荒波を越えた男たちの夢が紡いだ異空間～北前船寄港地・船主集落～ Aranami o koeta otoko-tachi no yume ga tsumuida i kūkan (kitamaebune kikō-chi・senshu shūraku)		Niigata	Izumozaki							
#039	The Kitamae-Bune Sea Routes: Ports and Residences Built on the Dreams of Brave Seafarers 荒波を越えた男たちの夢が紡いだ異空間～北前船寄港地・船主集落～ Aranami o koeta otoko-tachi no yume ga tsumuida i kūkan (kitamaebune kikō-chi・senshu shūraku)		Niigata	Jōetsu							
#039	The Kitamae-Bune Sea Routes: Ports and Residences Built on the Dreams of Brave Seafarers 荒波を越えた男たちの夢が紡いだ異空間～北前船寄港地・船主集落～ Aranami o koeta otoko-tachi no yume ga tsumuida i kūkan (kitamaebune kikō-chi・senshu shūraku)		Niigata	Nagaoka							
#039	The Kitamae-Bune Sea Routes: Ports and Residences Built on the Dreams of Brave Seafarers 荒波を越えた男たちの夢が紡いだ異空間～北前船寄港地・船主集落～ Aranami o koeta otoko-tachi no yume ga tsumuida i kūkan (kitamaebune kikō-chi・senshu shūraku)		Niigata	Niigata							
#039	The Kitamae-Bune Sea Routes: Ports and Residences Built on the Dreams of Brave Seafarers 荒波を越えた男たちの夢が紡いだ異空間～北前船寄港地・船主集落～ Aranami o koeta otoko-tachi no yume ga tsumuida i kūkan (kitamaebune kikō-chi・senshu shūraku)		Niigata	Sado							
#039	The Kitamae-Bune Sea Routes: Ports and Residences Built on the Dreams of Brave Seafarers 荒波を越えた男たちの夢が紡いだ異空間～北前船寄港地・船主集落～ Aranami o koeta otoko-tachi no yume ga tsumuida i kūkan (kitamaebune kikō-chi・senshu shūraku)		Toyama	Takaoka							
#039	The Kitamae-Bune Sea Routes: Ports and Residences Built on the Dreams of Brave Seafarers 荒波を越えた男たちの夢が紡いだ異空間～北前船寄港地・船主集落～ Aranami o koeta otoko-tachi no yume ga tsumuida i kūkan (kitamaebune kikō-chi・senshu shūraku)		Toyama	Toyama							
#039	The Kitamae-Bune Sea Routes: Ports and Residences Built on the Dreams of Brave Seafarers 荒波を越えた男たちの夢が紡いだ異空間～北前船寄港地・船主集落～ Aranami o koeta otoko-tachi no yume ga tsumuida i kūkan (kitamaebune kikō-chi・senshu shūraku)		Ishikawa	Hakusan							
#039	The Kitamae-Bune Sea Routes: Ports and Residences Built on the Dreams of Brave Seafarers 荒波を越えた男たちの夢が紡いだ異空間～北前船寄港地・船主集落～ Aranami o koeta otoko-tachi no yume ga tsumuida i kūkan (kitamaebune kikō-chi・senshu shūraku)		Ishikawa	Kaga							
#039	The Kitamae-Bune Sea Routes: Ports and Residences Built on the Dreams of Brave Seafarers 荒波を越えた男たちの夢が紡いだ異空間～北前船寄港地・船主集落～ Aranami o koeta otoko-tachi no yume ga tsumuida i kūkan (kitamaebune kikō-chi・senshu shūraku)		Ishikawa	Kanazawa							
#039	The Kitamae-Bune Sea Routes: Ports and Residences Built on the Dreams of Brave Seafarers 荒波を越えた男たちの夢が紡いだ異空間～北前船寄港地・船主集落～ Aranami o koeta otoko-tachi no yume ga tsumuida i kūkan (kitamaebune kikō-chi・senshu shūraku)		Ishikawa	Komatsu							
#039	The Kitamae-Bune Sea Routes: Ports and Residences Built on the Dreams of Brave Seafarers 荒波を越えた男たちの夢が紡いだ異空間～北前船寄港地・船主集落～ Aranami o koeta otoko-tachi no yume ga tsumuida i kūkan (kitamaebune kikō-chi・senshu shūraku)		Ishikawa	Shika							
#039	The Kitamae-Bune Sea Routes: Ports and Residences Built on the Dreams of Brave Seafarers 荒波を越えた男たちの夢が紡いだ異空間～北前船寄港地・船主集落～ Aranami o koeta otoko-tachi no yume ga tsumuida i kūkan (kitamaebune kikō-chi・senshu shūraku)		Ishikawa	Wajima							
#039	The Kitamae-Bune Sea Routes: Ports and Residences Built on the Dreams of Brave Seafarers 荒波を越えた男たちの夢が紡いだ異空間～北前船寄港地・船主集落～ Aranami o koeta otoko-tachi no yume ga tsumuida i kūkan (kitamaebune kikō-chi・senshu shūraku)		Fukui	Minamiechizen							
#039	The Kitamae-Bune Sea Routes: Ports and Residences Built on the Dreams of Brave Seafarers 荒波を越えた男たちの夢が紡いだ異空間～北前船寄港地・船主集落～ Aranami o koeta otoko-tachi no yume ga tsumuida i kūkan (kitamaebune kikō-chi・senshu shūraku)		Fukui	Obama							
#039	The Kitamae-Bune Sea Routes: Ports and Residences Built on the Dreams of Brave Seafarers 荒波を越えた男たちの夢が紡いだ異空間～北前船寄港地・船主集落～ Aranami o koeta otoko-tachi no yume ga tsumuida i kūkan (kitamaebune kikō-chi・senshu shūraku)		Fukui	Sakai							
#039	The Kitamae-Bune Sea Routes: Ports and Residences Built on the Dreams of Brave Seafarers 荒波を越えた男たちの夢が紡いだ異空間～北前船寄港地・船主集落～ Aranami o koeta otoko-tachi no yume ga tsumuida i kūkan (kitamaebune kikō-chi・senshu shūraku)		Fukui	Tsuruga							
#039	The Kitamae-Bune Sea Routes: Ports and Residences Built on the Dreams of Brave Seafarers 荒波を越えた男たちの夢が紡いだ異空間～北前船寄港地・船主集落～ Aranami o koeta otoko-tachi no yume ga tsumuida i kūkan (kitamaebune kikō-chi・senshu shūraku)		Kyōto	Miyazu							
#039	The Kitamae-Bune Sea Routes: Ports and Residences Built on the Dreams of Brave Seafarers 荒波を越えた男たちの夢が紡いだ異空間～北前船寄港地・船主集落～ Aranami o koeta otoko-tachi no yume ga tsumuida i kūkan (kitamaebune kikō-chi・senshu shūraku)		Ōsaka	Izumisano							
#039	The Kitamae-Bune Sea Routes: Ports and Residences Built on the Dreams of Brave Seafarers 荒波を越えた男たちの夢が紡いだ異空間～北前船寄港地・船主集落～ Aranami o koeta otoko-tachi no yume ga tsumuida i kūkan (kitamaebune kikō-chi・senshu shūraku)		Ōsaka	Ōsaka							
#039	The Kitamae-Bune Sea Routes: Ports and Residences Built on the Dreams of Brave Seafarers 荒波を越えた男たちの夢が紡いだ異空間～北前船寄港地・船主集落～ Aranami o koeta otoko-tachi no yume ga tsumuida i kūkan (kitamaebune kikō-chi・senshu shūraku)		Hyōgo	Akō							
#039	The Kitamae-Bune Sea Routes: Ports and Residences Built on the Dreams of Brave Seafarers 荒波を越えた男たちの夢が紡いだ異空間～北前船寄港地・船主集落～ Aranami o koeta otoko-tachi no yume ga tsumuida i kūkan (kitamaebune kikō-chi・senshu shūraku)		Hyōgo	Himeji							
#039	The Kitamae-Bune Sea Routes: Ports and Residences Built on the Dreams of Brave Seafarers 荒波を越えた男たちの夢が紡いだ異空間～北前船寄港地・船主集落～ Aranami o koeta otoko-tachi no yume ga tsumuida i kūkan (kitamaebune kikō-chi・senshu shūraku)		Hyōgo	Kobe							
#039	The Kitamae-Bune Sea Routes: Ports and Residences Built on the Dreams of Brave Seafarers 荒波を越えた男たちの夢が紡いだ異空間～北前船寄港地・船主集落～ Aranami o koeta otoko-tachi no yume ga tsumuida i kūkan (kitamaebune kikō-chi・senshu shūraku)		Hyōgo	Shin'onsen							
#039	The Kitamae-Bune Sea Routes: Ports and Residences Built on the Dreams of Brave Seafarers 荒波を越えた男たちの夢が紡いだ異空間～北前船寄港地・船主集落～ Aranami o koeta otoko-tachi no yume ga tsumuida i kūkan (kitamaebune kikō-chi・senshu shūraku)		Hyōgo	Sumoto							
#039	The Kitamae-Bune Sea Routes: Ports and Residences Built on the Dreams of Brave Seafarers 荒波を越えた男たちの夢が紡いだ異空間～北前船寄港地・船主集落～ Aranami o koeta otoko-tachi no yume ga tsumuida i kūkan (kitamaebune kikō-chi・senshu shūraku)		Hyōgo	Takasago							
#039	The Kitamae-Bune Sea Routes: Ports and Residences Built on the Dreams of Brave Seafarers 荒波を越えた男たちの夢が紡いだ異空間～北前船寄港地・船主集落～ Aranami o koeta otoko-tachi no yume ga tsumuida i kūkan (kitamaebune kikō-chi・senshu shūraku)		Hyōgo	Tatsuno							
#039	The Kitamae-Bune Sea Routes: Ports and Residences Built on the Dreams of Brave Seafarers 荒波を越えた男たちの夢が紡いだ異空間～北前船寄港地・船主集落～ Aranami o koeta otoko-tachi no yume ga tsumuida i kūkan (kitamaebune kikō-chi・senshu shūraku)		Tottori	Tottori							
#039	The Kitamae-Bune Sea Routes: Ports and Residences Built on the Dreams of Brave Seafarers 荒波を越えた男たちの夢が紡いだ異空間～北前船寄港地・船主集落～ Aranami o koeta otoko-tachi no yume ga tsumuida i kūkan (kitamaebune kikō-chi・senshu shūraku)		Shimane	Hamada							
#039	The Kitamae-Bune Sea Routes: Ports and Residences Built on the Dreams of Brave Seafarers 荒波を越えた男たちの夢が紡いだ異空間～北前船寄港地・船主集落～ Aranami o koeta otoko-tachi no yume ga tsumuida i kūkan (kitamaebune kikō-chi・senshu shūraku)		Okayama	Kurashiki							
#039	The Kitamae-Bune Sea Routes: Ports and Residences Built on the Dreams of Brave Seafarers 荒波を越えた男たちの夢が紡いだ異空間～北前船寄港地・船主集落～ Aranami o koeta otoko-tachi no yume ga tsumuida i kūkan (kitamaebune kikō-chi・senshu shūraku)		Hiroshima	Kure	Sumiyoshi Jinja; Ebisu Jinja			Wakaebisuya Site	Mitarai Important Preservation District for Groups of Historic Buildings (ja)	Chisago Wharf and Lighthouse	
#039	The Kitamae-Bune Sea Routes: Ports and Residences Built on the Dreams of Brave Seafarers 荒波を越えた男たちの夢が紡いだ異空間～北前船寄港地・船主集落～ Aranami o koeta otoko-tachi no yume ga tsumuida i kūkan (kitamaebune kikō-chi・senshu shūraku)		Hiroshima	Onomichi	Jōdo-ji					Townscape of Port Town Onomichi; Votive Offerings at Sumiyoshi Jinja; Komainu Riding on a Ball at Itsukushima Jinja; Onomichi-ura Byōbu; Townscape of Port Town Setoda	
#039	The Kitamae-Bune Sea Routes: Ports and Residences Built on the Dreams of Brave Seafarers 荒波を越えた男たちの夢が紡いだ異空間～北前船寄港地・船主集落～ Aranami o koeta otoko-tachi no yume ga tsumuida i kūkan (kitamaebune kikō-chi・senshu shūraku)		Hiroshima	Takehara	Former Yoshii Family Residence; Takehara Byōbu				Takehara Important Preservation District for Groups of Historic Buildings (ja)	All-night lights; Materials of Takehara Municipal Library (ja)	
#039	The Kitamae-Bune Sea Routes: Ports and Residences Built on the Dreams of Brave Seafarers 荒波を越えた男たちの夢が紡いだ異空間～北前船寄港地・船主集落～ Aranami o koeta otoko-tachi no yume ga tsumuida i kūkan (kitamaebune kikō-chi・senshu shūraku)		Kagawa	Tadotsu	Kompira Torii; Kompira Lanterns		Kitamae-bune-related Materials at Tadotsu Municipal Museum			Former Shiota Family Storehouse; Goda Family Residence; Former Asahiya Inn (Takeda Family Residence); Kompira Jinja; Itsukushima Jinja; Shirahige Jinja; Ebisu Jinja; Tanpo, Tadotsu; Townscape of Higashihama, Nishihama, Hondori	
#040	Samurai Silk: Tsuruoka and Scenes of Early Modern Japan サムライゆかりのシルク～日本近代化の原風景に出会うまち鶴岡へ～ Samurai yukari no shiruku (Nihon kindai-ka no genfūkei ni deau machi Tsuruoka e)		Yamagata	Tsuruoka							
#041	Gyōda, town of Tabi gura that continues to support Japanese kimono culture from the feet 和装文化の足元を支え続ける足袋蔵のまち行田; Wasō bunka no ashimoto o sasae tsuzukeru tabi kura no machi Gyōda		Saitama	Gyōda							
#042	The Villages of Secret Arts: The Real Ninja of Iga and Kōka 忍びの里 伊賀・甲賀～リアル忍者を求めて～ Nihon jiki no furusato Hizen (hyakka ryōran no yakimono sanpo)		Shiga	Kōka							
#042	The Villages of Secret Arts: The Real Ninja of Iga and Kōka 忍びの里 伊賀・甲賀～リアル忍者を求めて～ Nihon jiki no furusato Hizen (hyakka ryōran no yakimono sanpo)		Mie	Iga							
#043	Tango Chirimen Textile Road: A 300-Year History of Weaving Silk Crêpe Textiles 300年を紡ぐ絹が織り成す丹後ちりめん回廊; Sanbyaku-nen o tsumugu kinu ga orinasu Tango chirimen kairō		Kyōto	Ine							
#043	Tango Chirimen Textile Road: A 300-Year History of Weaving Silk Crêpe Textiles 300年を紡ぐ絹が織り成す丹後ちりめん回廊; Sanbyaku-nen o tsumugu kinu ga orinasu Tango chirimen kairō		Kyōto	Kyōtango							
#043	Tango Chirimen Textile Road: A 300-Year History of Weaving Silk Crêpe Textiles 300年を紡ぐ絹が織り成す丹後ちりめん回廊; Sanbyaku-nen o tsumugu kinu ga orinasu Tango chirimen kairō		Kyōto	Miyazu							
#043	Tango Chirimen Textile Road: A 300-Year History of Weaving Silk Crêpe Textiles 300年を紡ぐ絹が織り成す丹後ちりめん回廊; Sanbyaku-nen o tsumugu kinu ga orinasu Tango chirimen kairō		Kyōto	Yosano							
#044	Takenouchi Kaido/Yokoōji: Japan's Oldest National Highway with a History of 1400 Years 1400年に渡る悠久の歴史を伝える「最古の国道」～竹内街道・横大路（大道）～ Sen yonhyaku-nen ni wataru yūkyū no rekishi o tsutaeru "saiko no kokudō" (Takeuchi kaidō Yokoōji (daidō))		Ōsaka								
#044	Takenouchi Kaido/Yokoōji: Japan's Oldest National Highway with a History of 1400 Years 1400年に渡る悠久の歴史を伝える「最古の国道」～竹内街道・横大路（大道）～ Sen yonhyaku-nen ni wataru yūkyū no rekishi o tsutaeru "saiko no kokudō" (Takeuchi kaidō Yokoōji (daidō))		Nara								
#045	The Old Silver Mine Carriage Road and Road of Ore: Ban tan’s Industrial Heritage Route, Memories of Resource Rich Japan. 播但貫く、銀の馬車道 鉱石の道～資源大国日本の記憶をたどる73kmの轍～ Bantan tsuranuku, gin no bashadō kōseki no michi (shigen taikoku Nihon no kioku o tadoru nanajūsan kiromētoru no wadachi)		Hyōgo								
#046	Wakanoura Bay: A Treasure House of Scenic Beauty 絶景の宝庫 和歌の浦; Zekkei no hōko Wakanoura		Wakayama	Kainan							
#046	Wakanoura Bay: A Treasure House of Scenic Beauty 絶景の宝庫 和歌の浦; Zekkei no hōko Wakanoura		Wakayama	Wakayama							
#047	Kishū Yuasa’s Soy Brewery: Japan's First Soy Sauce 「最初の一滴」醤油醸造の発祥の地 紀州湯浅 "Saisho no itteki" shōyu jōzō no hasshō no chi Kishū Yuasa		Wakayama	Yuasa							
#048	The Sunset in the Sacred land of Izumo: Sunset Created by the Gods 日が沈む聖地出雲～神が創り出した地の夕日を巡る～ Hi ga shizumu seichi Izumo (Kami ga tsukuridashita chi no yūhi o meguru)		Shimane	Izumo	Izumo Taisha Honden; Kami-no-Miya; Hinomisaki Jinja (ja) Shaden; Izumo Fudoki (ja) (Hinomisaki-bon); Armour with White Threads		Ōdochi Kagura	Fumi-shima Black-tailed gull Breeding Grounds; Inome Cave (ja) Remains	Izumo Hinomisaki Lighthouse (ja)	Inasa Beach (ja); Sono no Nagahama; Hinomisaki (ja); Nagahama Jinja (ja); Kando Rivermouth (ja); Kami-mukae Ritual; Byōbu-iwa; Fudenage-jima; Tsubute-iwa; Tsukiyomi-sha; Miyuki Ritual; Uryū; Gongen-jima (Kumano Jinja); Sagi Bay	
#049	Kurashiki and the Story of Fiber: East Meets West through the Planting of Cotton 一輪の綿花から始まる倉敷物語～和と洋が織りなす繊維のまち～ Ichirin no menka kara hajimaru Kurashiki monogatari (wa to yō ga orinasu sen'i no machi)		Okayama	Kurashiki							
#050	Six Ancient Kilns: Japanese Ceramics Born and Raised in Japan きっと恋する六古窯～日本生まれ日本育ちのやきもの産地～ Kitto koisuru roku koyō (Nihon umare Nihon sodachi no yakimono sanchi)		Aichi	Seto							
#050	Six Ancient Kilns: Japanese Ceramics Born and Raised in Japan きっと恋する六古窯～日本生まれ日本育ちのやきもの産地～ Kitto koisuru roku koyō (Nihon umare Nihon sodachi no yakimono sanchi)		Aichi	Tokoname							
#050	Six Ancient Kilns: Japanese Ceramics Born and Raised in Japan きっと恋する六古窯～日本生まれ日本育ちのやきもの産地～ Kitto koisuru roku koyō (Nihon umare Nihon sodachi no yakimono sanchi)		Fukui	Echizen							
#050	Six Ancient Kilns: Japanese Ceramics Born and Raised in Japan きっと恋する六古窯～日本生まれ日本育ちのやきもの産地～ Kitto koisuru roku koyō (Nihon umare Nihon sodachi no yakimono sanchi)		Shiga	Kōka							
#050	Six Ancient Kilns: Japanese Ceramics Born and Raised in Japan きっと恋する六古窯～日本生まれ日本育ちのやきもの産地～ Kitto koisuru roku koyō (Nihon umare Nihon sodachi no yakimono sanchi)		Hyōgo	Tamba-Sasayama							
#050	Six Ancient Kilns: Japanese Ceramics Born and Raised in Japan きっと恋する六古窯～日本生まれ日本育ちのやきもの産地～ Kitto koisuru roku koyō (Nihon umare Nihon sodachi no yakimono sanchi)		Okayama	Bizen							
#051	From Forestry Railway to The Yuzu Road: The Scenery and Food Culture of Tosa’s Chūgei Region 森林鉄道から日本一のゆずロードへ～ゆずが香り彩る南国土佐・中芸地域の景観と食文化～ Shinrin tetsudō kara Nihon ichi no yuzu rōdo e (yuzu ga kaori irodoru nangoku Tosa・Chūgei chiiki no keikan to shoku bunka)		Kōchi								
#052	Kanmon "Nostalgic" Straits: Memories of Japan's modernization frozen in time 関門"ノスタルジック"海峡～時の停車場、近代化の記憶～ Kanmon "nosutarujikku" kaikyō (toki no teishaba, kindaika no kioku)		Yamaguchi	Shimonoseki	Mutsurejima Lighthouse; Former British Consulate in Shimonoseki (ja); Former Miyazaki Trading House; Former Akita Company Building (Shimonoseki Tourist Information Centre); Yamaguchi Bank Former Head Office; Former Kanenotsuru-Misaki Lighthouse; Former Ministry of Communications Shimonoseki Post Office Telephone Section Building			Chōshū Domain Shimonoseki Maeda Battery Site	Shimonoseki Nabe-chō Post Office (ja) (Former Akamagaseki Post and Telegraph Office); Former Miyazaki Trading House; Hachiya Building (Former Tōyō Whaling Corporation Shimonoseki Branch); Fujiwara Yoshie Memorial Museum (Former Ringer Residence); Sino-Japanese Peace Memorial Hall	Mitsubishi Heavy Industries Shimonoseki Shipyard (ja) (Dock No.3, Dock No.4); Kanmon Building (Former Kanmon Kisen Corporation (ja); Kanmon Tunnel Outbound Line, Inbound Line; Holme, Ringer & Co.; Shimonoseki Station Handbell; Tatakiuri Banana Auctions (ja); Fugu Cuisine	
#052	Kanmon "Nostalgic" Straits: Memories of Japan's modernization frozen in time 関門"ノスタルジック"海峡～時の停車場、近代化の記憶～ Kanmon "nosutarujikku" kaikyō (toki no teishaba, kindaika no kioku)		Fukuoka	Kitakyūshū	Mojikō Station (Former Moji Station) Main Building; Former Moji Mitsui Club (ja) Main Building, Annex; Iwada Family Residence Main Building, Storehouse				Kyūshū Railway History Museum (ja); Former Kyūshū Railway Headquarters; Former Sapporo Breweries Kyūshū Plant Office, Brewery, Union Building, Warehouses (ja); Ueno Building (Former Mitsubishi Limited Partnership Wakamatsu Branch) Main Building, Storehouse, Former Analysis Office, etc.; Former Ōsaka Shosen (ja); Kinnabe Restaurant Main Building, Front Gate; Former Furukawa Mining Enterprise Wakamatsu Building; Moji Ward Office (Former Moji City Office)	Hesaki Lighthouse; Wakamatsu Sekitan Hall; Former Moji Customs House (ja); Tochinoki Building; Nikka Whisky Moji Distillery (Former Taiyō Refinery) Factory, Storehouse; Moji Yūsen Building (Former Nippon Yūsen Moji Branch); Former Dalian Route Terminal; Sankirō; Chūgoku Labour Bank Shimonoseki Branch (ja) (Former Fudō Chokin Bank Branch (ja) Branch); Kitakyūshū Bank Moji Branch (ja) (Former Yokohama Specie Bank Branch); Former JR Kyūshū Headquarters Building (ja); Kanmon Tunnel Outbound Line, Inbound Line; World Peace Pagoda (ja); Tatakiuri Banana Auctions (ja); Fugu Cuisine	
#053	Two Millennia of Rice Cultivation: The Kikuchigawa River Basin 米作り、二千年にわたる大地の記憶～菊池川流域「今昔『水稲』物語」～ Kome-tsukuri, nisen-nen ni wataru daichi no kioku (Kikuchi-gawa ryūiki 'konjaku "suitō" monogatari')		Kumamoto	Kikuchi							
#053	Two Millennia of Rice Cultivation: The Kikuchigawa River Basin 米作り、二千年にわたる大地の記憶～菊池川流域「今昔『水稲』物語」～ Kome-tsukuri, nisen-nen ni wataru daichi no kioku (Kikuchi-gawa ryūiki 'konjaku "suitō" monogatari')		Kumamoto	Nagomi							
#053	Two Millennia of Rice Cultivation: The Kikuchigawa River Basin 米作り、二千年にわたる大地の記憶～菊池川流域「今昔『水稲』物語」～ Kome-tsukuri, nisen-nen ni wataru daichi no kioku (Kikuchi-gawa ryūiki 'konjaku "suitō" monogatari')		Kumamoto	Tamana							
#053	Two Millennia of Rice Cultivation: The Kikuchigawa River Basin 米作り、二千年にわたる大地の記憶～菊池川流域「今昔『水稲』物語」～ Kome-tsukuri, nisen-nen ni wataru daichi no kioku (Kikuchi-gawa ryūiki 'konjaku "suitō" monogatari')		Kumamoto	Yamaga							
#054	Yabakei Scenery: Travelling in the Sansui Scroll Painting of Nature やばけい遊覧～大地に描いた山水絵巻の道をゆく～ Yabakei yūran (daichi ni kaita sansui emaki no michi o yuku)		Ōita	Kusu							
#054	Yabakei Scenery: Travelling in the Sansui Scroll Painting of Nature やばけい遊覧～大地に描いた山水絵巻の道をゆく～ Yabakei yūran (daichi ni kaita sansui emaki no michi o yuku)		Ōita	Nakatsu							
#055	Kamikawa Ainu in Coexistence with Kamuy: Traditional World of the Gods at the Foot of the Daisetsuzan Mountain Range カムイと共に生きる上川アイヌ～大雪山のふところに伝承される神々の世界～ Kamui to tomoni ikiru Kamikawa Ainu (Daisetsuzan no futokoro ni denshōsareru kamigami no sekai)		Hokkaidō								
#056	Yama-dera and Safflower Culture 山寺が支えた紅花文化; Yamadera ga sasaeta benibana bunka		Yamagata								
#057	A Journey of Exploratorion into the Secrets of the Underground Labyrinth: Utsunomiya, Town of Vibrant Ōya Stone Culture 地下迷宮の秘密を探る旅～大谷石文化が息づくまち宇都宮～ Chika meikyū no himitsu o saguru tabi (Ōya-ishi bunka ga ikizuku machi Utsunomiya)		Tochigi	Utsunomiya							
#058	A Future Mapped Out by Meiji Aristocrats: The Romantic Tale of the Nasunogahara Pioneers 明治貴族が描いた未来～那須野が原開拓浪漫譚～ Meiji kizoku ga kaita mirai (Nasunogahara kaitaku roman-tan)		Tochigi								
#059	Inami Woodcarving Museum Born from the Chisels of Master Carpenters 宮大工の鑿一丁から生まれた木彫刻美術館・井波; Miyadaiku no nomi (Chō kara umareta ki chōkoku bijutsukan Inami)		Toyama	Nanto							
#060	A Landscape Interwoven with Vineyards: Kyōtō District, Yamanashi Prefecture 葡萄畑が織りなす風景～山梨県峡東地域～ Budō-hata ga orinasu fūkei (Yamanashi-ken Kyōtō chiiki)		Yamanashi	Fuefuki							
#060	A Landscape Interwoven with Vineyards: Kyōtō District, Yamanashi Prefecture 葡萄畑が織りなす風景～山梨県峡東地域～ Budō-hata ga orinasu fūkei (Yamanashi-ken Kyōtō chiiki)		Yamanashi	Kōshū							
#060	A Landscape Interwoven with Vineyards: Kyōtō District, Yamanashi Prefecture 葡萄畑が織りなす風景～山梨県峡東地域～ Budō-hata ga orinasu fūkei (Yamanashi-ken Kyōtō chiiki)		Yamanashi	Yamanashi							
#061	The Jōmon World of the Starry Central Highlands: A Journey of Encounter with the Obsidian Mines and Jōmon People Dating Back Thousands of Years 星降る中部高地の縄文世界～数千年を遡る黒曜石鉱山と縄文人に出会う旅～ Hoshi furu chūbu kōchi no Jōmon sekai (sū-sen-nen o sakanoboru kokuyōseki kōzan to Jōmon-jin ni deau tabi)		Nagano								
#061	The Jōmon World of the Starry Central Highlands: A Journey of Encounter with the Obsidian Mines and Jōmon People Dating Back Thousands of Years 星降る中部高地の縄文世界～数千年を遡る黒曜石鉱山と縄文人に出会う旅～ Hoshi furu chūbu kōchi no Jōmon sekai (sū-sen-nen o sakanoboru kokuyōseki kōzan to Jōmon-jin ni deau tabi)		Yamanashi								
#062	In Travellers’ Footsteps on Ancient Cobblestone Roads: A Distant Edo Journey Following the Hakone Hachiri Route 旅人たちの足跡残る悠久の石畳道～箱根八里で辿る遥かな江戸の旅路～ Tabibitotachi no ashiato nokoru yūkyū no ishidatamidō (Hikone hachiri de tadoru harukana Edo no tabiji)		Shizuoka	Kannami							
#062	In Travellers’ Footsteps on Ancient Cobblestone Roads: A Distant Edo Journey Following the Hakone Hachiri Route 旅人たちの足跡残る悠久の石畳道～箱根八里で辿る遥かな江戸の旅路～ Tabibitotachi no ashiato nokoru yūkyū no ishidatamidō (Hikone hachiri de tadoru harukana Edo no tabiji)		Shizuoka	Mishima							
#062	In Travellers’ Footsteps on Ancient Cobblestone Roads: A Distant Edo Journey Following the Hakone Hachiri Route 旅人たちの足跡残る悠久の石畳道～箱根八里で辿る遥かな江戸の旅路～ Tabibitotachi no ashiato nokoru yūkyū no ishidatamidō (Hikone hachiri de tadoru harukana Edo no tabiji)		Kanagawa	Hakone							
#062	In Travellers’ Footsteps on Ancient Cobblestone Roads: A Distant Edo Journey Following the Hakone Hachiri Route 旅人たちの足跡残る悠久の石畳道～箱根八里で辿る遥かな江戸の旅路～ Tabibitotachi no ashiato nokoru yūkyū no ishidatamidō (Hikone hachiri de tadoru harukana Edo no tabiji)		Kanagawa	Odawara							
#063	Eternal Relief: Heritage of Disaster Prevention Through the Memories of Tsunami and Recovery in Hirogawa 「百世の安堵」〜津波と復興の記憶が生きる広川の防災遺産〜 "Momoyo no ando" (tsunami to fukkō no kioku ga ikiru Hirogawa no bōsai isan)		Wakayama	Hirogawa	Hiro Hachiman Jinja; Hōzō-ji; Ansei Monroku; Yōgen-ji; Hamaguchi Family Residence			Hiromura Seawall (ja); Taikyū-sha; Tombstone of Hamaguchi Goryō; Tomb of Hamaguchi Goryō	Izumi Family Residence; Former Toda Family Residence	Landscapes of Nabaenohana and Takashima; Pines of the Hiromura Seawall; Inamura (ja); 1854 Takanami-no-zu Painting; Emperor's Stone Wall; Nanki-Otokoyama-yaki; Hiromura Sugidan Prospectus; Townscape of the Hiro Area; Anraku-ji; Hamaguchi Goryō Archives; Ōmichi Road; Tsunami Matsuri (ja); Appreciation Monument; Memorial Monument for Drowned People; Bronze Statue of Hamaguchi Goryō	
#064	Okayama, the Birthplace of the Legend of Momotarō: Ancient Kibi Heritage Conveying Tales of Demon Slaying 「桃太郎伝説」の生まれたまち おかやま～古代吉備の遺産が誘う鬼退治の物語～ "Momotarō densetsu" no umareta machi Okayama (kodai Kibi no isan ga izanau oni taiji no monogatari)		Okayama	Akaiwa							
#064	Okayama, the Birthplace of the Legend of Momotarō: Ancient Kibi Heritage Conveying Tales of Demon Slaying 「桃太郎伝説」の生まれたまち おかやま～古代吉備の遺産が誘う鬼退治の物語～ "Momotarō densetsu" no umareta machi Okayama (kodai Kibi no isan ga izanau oni taiji no monogatari)		Okayama	Kurashiki							
#064	Okayama, the Birthplace of the Legend of Momotarō: Ancient Kibi Heritage Conveying Tales of Demon Slaying 「桃太郎伝説」の生まれたまち おかやま～古代吉備の遺産が誘う鬼退治の物語～ "Momotarō densetsu" no umareta machi Okayama (kodai Kibi no isan ga izanau oni taiji no monogatari)		Okayama	Okayama							
#064	Okayama, the Birthplace of the Legend of Momotarō: Ancient Kibi Heritage Conveying Tales of Demon Slaying 「桃太郎伝説」の生まれたまち おかやま～古代吉備の遺産が誘う鬼退治の物語～ "Momotarō densetsu" no umareta machi Okayama (kodai Kibi no isan ga izanau oni taiji no monogatari)		Okayama	Sōja							
#065	Japan's Leading Port Town of Early-Modern Times: Tomonoura, with its Sepia Tones Enveloped in the Evening Calm of the Seto Inland Sea 瀬戸の夕凪が包む国内随一の近世港町～セピア色の港町に日常が溶け込む鞆の浦～ Seto no yūnagi ga tsutsumu kokunai zuiichi no kinsei Minato-machi (sepia-iro no Minato-machi ni nichijō ga tokekomu Tomonoura)		Hiroshima	Fukuyama							
#066	Kunisaki － Where Oni and Buddhas Coexist as One 鬼が仏になった里『くにさき』 Oni ga Butsu ni natta sato "Kuni Saki"		Ōita	Bungotakada	Kumano magaibutsu; Taizō-ji; Maki Ōdō and the wooden statue of Fudō Myōō; Fuki-ji; Wooden masks; Chion-ji; Wooden statue of Tarōten; Mudō-ji (ja); Ōreki-ji (ja)		Tennen-ji Shujō Oni-e; Shujō Oni-e (ja)	Kumano magaibutsu; Motomiya magaibutsu (ja); Nabeyama magaibutsu (ja); Fuki-ji; Chion-ji; Chōan-ji (ja); Tennen-ji (ja); Kawanaka Fudō; Tennen-ji Yaba and Mumyō Bridge; Mudō-ji (ja); Mudō-ji Yaba; Fukuma magaibutsu (ja); Ōreki-ji (ja); Shrine grounds of Rogōsan Ebiosuiwaya; Nakayama Senkyō (Ebisu-dani (ja))	Rural landscape of Tashibunosho Osaki (ja) (inc. farming villages, Yūhi Iwaya, and Anaido Kannon; Kasuga Jinja (ja)	The stone steps built by oni; Rural landscape of Tashibunosho Kumano (ja); Motomiya Hachiman Shrine; Mount Saiei; Iwawaki-ji; Kishiro; Matama Yuhara Onsen; Onigajō; Oninoshiki Water; Oni-no-Mezamashi (Koshō mochi); Oni masks; Cyperus malaccensis; Mine-iri no gyō; Mountain roads of Rokugō Manzan (ja)	
#066	Kunisaki － Where Oni and Buddhas Coexist as One 鬼が仏になった里『くにさき』 Oni ga Butsu ni natta sato "Kuni Saki"		Ōita	Kunisaki	Wooden statue of Oni Daishi; Jingū-ji (ritual implements and fire-damaged Buddhas); Gyōnyū-ji (Buddhist statuary); Mokkan of Iizuka Ruins; Hōmei-ji (Kunisaki-tō (ja)); Rurikō-ji (Buddhist statuary); Futago-ji (Kunisaki-tō (ja) and Buddhist statuary)		Iwato-ji Shujō Oni-e; Jōbutsu-ji Shujō Oni-e; Maruono-ji Kōyō Oni-e; Shujō Oni-e (ja)	Ōfudō Iwaya; Onizuka Kofun (ja); Old Sentō-ji (ja) (inc. a cluster of gorintō); Itstsuji Fudō; Iwato-ji (ja); Monjusen-ji (ja); Futago-ji	Sentō-ji (ja) (oni masks); Kebesu Festival (ja); Kayashima Sake Brewery (ja)	Akane Onsen; Meal for the oni in Iwato Village; Jōbutsu-ji (ja); Maruono-ji; Oni Bridge; Oninosewari; Oni-no-Mezamashi (Koshō mochi); Oni masks; Cyperus malaccensis; Mine-iri no gyō; Mountain roads of Rokugō Manzan (ja)	
#067	Monuments of Ancient People: Scenic Ancient Burial Mounds in the Southern Land on the Plateaus of Tropical of Miyazaki 古代人のモニュメント～台地に絵を描く南国宮崎の古墳景観～ Kodai-bito no monyumento (daichi ni e o kaku nankoku Miyazaki no kofun keikan)		Miyazaki	Miyazaki	Assemblage of Excavated Artefacts from Shimokitakata Underground-Style Cave No.5, Miyazaki			Ikime Kofun Cluster (ja); Hasugaike Kofun Cluster (ja)		Excavated Artefacts from Ikime Kofun Cluster	
#067	Monuments of Ancient People: Scenic Ancient Burial Mounds in the Southern Land on the Plateaus of Tropical of Miyazaki 古代人のモニュメント～台地に絵を描く南国宮崎の古墳景観～ Kodai-bito no monyumento (daichi ni e o kaku nankoku Miyazaki no kofun keikan)		Miyazaki	Saito	House- and Ship-Shaped Haniwa Excavated from Saitobaru Kofun Cluster; Gilt Bronze Harness Excavated from Saitobaru Kofun Cluster			Saitobaru Kofun Cluster; Saitobaru No.206 Kofun (Oninoiwaya Kofun)		Mesahozuka Kofun (ja); Osahozuka Kofun (ja); Mount Takatori; Kofun Lane (Road of the Chronicles (ja)): Excavated Artefacts from Saitobaru Kofun Cluster; Saito Kofun Festival (ja)	
#067	Monuments of Ancient People: Scenic Ancient Burial Mounds in the Southern Land on the Plateaus of Tropical of Miyazaki 古代人のモニュメント～台地に絵を描く南国宮崎の古墳景観～ Kodai-bito no monyumento (daichi ni e o kaku nankoku Miyazaki no kofun keikan)		Miyazaki	Shintomi				Nyūtabaru Kofun Cluster (ja)		Haniwa Excavated from Nyūtabaru No.58 Kofun (Mukadezuka Kofun)	
#068	See Japan's National Policies at Play in Hokkaidō: Industrial Revolution in the North, "Ports of Coal and Steel" 本邦国策を北海道に観よ！～北の産業革命「炭鉄港」～ Honpō koku-saku o Hokkaidō ni miyo! (Kita no sangyō kakumei "sumitetsu-kō")		Hokkaidō								
#069	Michinoku's Love Affair with Gold: Zipangu the Land of Gold, Tracing the Origins of Gold Production みちのくGOLD浪漫～黄金の国ジパング、産金はじまりの地をたどる～ Michinoku gōrudo roman (kogane no kuni Zipangu, sankin hajimari no chi o tadoru)		Iwate	Hiraizumi	Chūson-ji Konjiki-dō						
#069	Michinoku's Love Affair with Gold: Zipangu the Land of Gold, Tracing the Origins of Gold Production みちのくGOLD浪漫～黄金の国ジパング、産金はじまりの地をたどる～ Michinoku gōrudo roman (kogane no kuni Zipangu, sankin hajimari no chi o tadoru)		Iwate	Rikuzentakata							
#069	Michinoku's Love Affair with Gold: Zipangu the Land of Gold, Tracing the Origins of Gold Production みちのくGOLD浪漫～黄金の国ジパング、産金はじまりの地をたどる～ Michinoku gōrudo roman (kogane no kuni Zipangu, sankin hajimari no chi o tadoru)		Miyagi	Kesennuma							
#069	Michinoku's Love Affair with Gold: Zipangu the Land of Gold, Tracing the Origins of Gold Production みちのくGOLD浪漫～黄金の国ジパング、産金はじまりの地をたどる～ Michinoku gōrudo roman (kogane no kuni Zipangu, sankin hajimari no chi o tadoru)		Miyagi	Minamisanriku							
#069	Michinoku's Love Affair with Gold: Zipangu the Land of Gold, Tracing the Origins of Gold Production みちのくGOLD浪漫～黄金の国ジパング、産金はじまりの地をたどる～ Michinoku gōrudo roman (kogane no kuni Zipangu, sankin hajimari no chi o tadoru)		Miyagi	Wakuya							
#070	Sato-numa: Tatebayashi Wetland Culture Refined by the Marshes of "Prayer," "Crops," and "Defence" 里沼（SATO-NUMA）～「祈り」「実り」「守り」の沼が磨き上げた館林の沼辺文化～ Satonuma ("inori" "minori" "mamori" no numa ga migakiageta Tatebayashi no numa-be bunka)		Gunma	Tatebayashi							
#071	A Journey to Open the Door to 400 Years of History: Reading Mediaeval and Early Modern Town Development From Stones, Echizen and Fukui 400年の歴史の扉を開ける旅～石から読み解く中世・近世のまちづくり 越前・福井～ Yonhyaku-nen no rekishi no tobira o akeru tabi (ishi kara yomitoku chūsei kinsei no machi-zukuri Echizen・Fukui)		Fukui	Fukui							
#071	A Journey to Open the Door to 400 Years of History: Reading Mediaeval and Early Modern Town Development From Stones, Echizen and Fukui 400年の歴史の扉を開ける旅～石から読み解く中世・近世のまちづくり 越前・福井～ Yonhyaku-nen no rekishi no tobira o akeru tabi (ishi kara yomitoku chūsei kinsei no machi-zukuri Echizen・Fukui)		Fukui	Katsuyama							
#072	Where Shibori Takes Place, Steeped in the Atmosphere of the Edo Period: Arimatsu, a Town Where Indigo Dyeing Sways in the Wind 江戸時代の情緒に触れる絞りの産地～藍染が風にゆれる町 有松～ Edo jidai no jōcho ni fureru shibori no sanchi (aizome ga kaze ni yureru machi Arimatsu)		Aichi	Nagoya							
#073	Shima & Toba, Towns Where You Can Encounter Ama: Women Who Live Through Skin Diving 海女(Ama）に出逢えるまち 鳥羽・志摩～素潜り漁に生きる女性たち～ Ama ni deaeru machi Toba・Shima (sumoguri-ryō ni ikiru josei-tachi)		Mie	Shima			Ama Fishing Techniques of Toba and Shima; Anori Ningyō Shibai (ja); Isobe-no-Omita (ja); Nakiri Waraji-hiki (ja)		Production Tools and Related Materials of Shima Peninsula; Daiō-saki Lighthouse (ja); Anori-saki Lighthouse (ja)	Dedication of Abalone at Ise Jingū; Shiokake Matsuri (Ōshima Matsuri); Kojima Matsuri; Hama-kiyome; Ishigyō-orashi; Izawa-no-Miya (ja); Nail-Carved Fudō; Stone Buddha (Shiobutsu); Views of the Cultured Pearl Rafts and Ria Coast; Mugi-zaki Lighthouse; Nakiri Townscape; Former Koshika Village Archive Documents; Dōman-Seiman (ja)	
#073	Shima & Toba, Towns Where You Can Encounter Ama: Women Who Live Through Skin Diving 海女(Ama）に出逢えるまち 鳥羽・志摩～素潜り漁に生きる女性たち～ Ama ni deaeru machi Toba・Shima (sumoguri-ryō ni ikiru josei-tachi)		Mie	Toba			Ama Fishing Techniques of Toba and Shima; Kuzaki (ja) Abalone Noshi-Making; Fishing Tackle of Ise Bay, Shima Peninsula, and Kumano Sea; Shirongo Matsuri		Kuzaki Notto New Year	Excavated Artefacts from the Shirahama Site; Aominesan Shōfuku-ji (ja); Amakazukime Jinja (ja); Kazukiori; Ishigami-san; Kami-shima Yasshiro Jinja; Looking Glasses; Niwa Beach; Narrow Alleys of Tōshijima	
#074	A 1300 Year Japanese Journey of Preparing for Death: Saigoku Thirty-Three Kannon Pilgrimage 1300年つづく日本の終活の旅～西国三十三所観音巡礼～ Sen sanbyaku-nen tsuzuku Nihon no tsui katsu no tabi (Saigoku sanjūsan-sho Kannon junrei)		Wakayama								
#074	A 1300 Year Japanese Journey of Preparing for Death: Saigoku Thirty-Three Kannon Pilgrimage 1300年つづく日本の終活の旅～西国三十三所観音巡礼～ Sen sanbyaku-nen tsuzuku Nihon no tsui katsu no tabi (Saigoku sanjūsan-sho Kannon junrei)		Ōsaka								
#074	A 1300 Year Japanese Journey of Preparing for Death: Saigoku Thirty-Three Kannon Pilgrimage 1300年つづく日本の終活の旅～西国三十三所観音巡礼～ Sen sanbyaku-nen tsuzuku Nihon no tsui katsu no tabi (Saigoku sanjūsan-sho Kannon junrei)		Nara								
#074	A 1300 Year Japanese Journey of Preparing for Death: Saigoku Thirty-Three Kannon Pilgrimage 1300年つづく日本の終活の旅～西国三十三所観音巡礼～ Sen sanbyaku-nen tsuzuku Nihon no tsui katsu no tabi (Saigoku sanjūsan-sho Kannon junrei)		Kyōto								
#074	A 1300 Year Japanese Journey of Preparing for Death: Saigoku Thirty-Three Kannon Pilgrimage 1300年つづく日本の終活の旅～西国三十三所観音巡礼～ Sen sanbyaku-nen tsuzuku Nihon no tsui katsu no tabi (Saigoku sanjūsan-sho Kannon junrei)		Shiga								
#074	A 1300 Year Japanese Journey of Preparing for Death: Saigoku Thirty-Three Kannon Pilgrimage 1300年つづく日本の終活の旅～西国三十三所観音巡礼～ Sen sanbyaku-nen tsuzuku Nihon no tsui katsu no tabi (Saigoku sanjūsan-sho Kannon junrei)		Hyōgo								
#074	A 1300 Year Japanese Journey of Preparing for Death: Saigoku Thirty-Three Kannon Pilgrimage 1300年つづく日本の終活の旅～西国三十三所観音巡礼～ Sen sanbyaku-nen tsuzuku Nihon no tsui katsu no tabi (Saigoku sanjūsan-sho Kannon junrei)		Gifu								
#075	An Invitation to Travel, A Town Conveyed in Two Pictures: The Landscape of Mediaeval Hinenoshō 旅引付と二枚の絵図が伝えるまち～中世日根荘の風景～ Tabi hikitsuke to ni-mai no ezu ga tsutaeru machi (chūsei Hinenoshō no fūkei)		Ōsaka	Izumisano							
#076	A Town Where you Can Meet With the Middle Ages: A Treasure House of Mediaeval Cultural Heritage Protected for a Thousand Years 中世に出逢えるまち～千年にわたり護られてきた中世文化遺産の宝庫～ Chūsei ni deaeru machi (chitose ni watari mamorarete kita chūsei bunka isan no hōko)		Ōsaka	Kawachinagano							
#077	"Japan No.1" Town for Salt Production, Banshū Akō 「日本第一」の塩を産したまち 播州赤穂 "Nihon daiichi" no shio o mushita machi Banshū Akō		Hyōgo	Akō							
#078	Wondrous Views and Unexplored Regions Created by Winds Over the Sea of Japan: Great Lands of Dance "Inaba and Tajima" where Reijū and Kirin Bring Happiness 日本海の風が生んだ絶景と秘境～幸せを呼ぶ霊獣・麒麟が舞う大地「因幡・但馬」～ Nihon-kai no kaze ga unda zekkei to hikyō (shiawase o yobu reijū・kirin ga mau daichi "Inaba・Tajima")		Tottori								
#078	Wondrous Views and Unexplored Regions Created by Winds Over the Sea of Japan: Great Lands of Dance "Inaba and Tajima" where Reijū and Kirin Bring Happiness 日本海の風が生んだ絶景と秘境～幸せを呼ぶ霊獣・麒麟が舞う大地「因幡・但馬」～ Nihon-kai no kaze ga unda zekkei to hikyō (shiawase o yobu reijū・kirin ga mau daichi "Inaba・Tajima")		Hyōgo								
#079	A World of Myth in which Kami and Oni Move: Kagura Handed Down in the Iwami Region 神々や鬼たちが躍動する神話の世界～石見地域で伝承される神楽～ Kamigami ya oni-tachi ga yakudō suru shinwa no sekai (Iwami chiiki de denshōsareru kagura)		Shimane								
#080	Did You Know!? Islands of Stone where Time Flows Eternal: the Setouchi Bisan Islands that Crossed the Sea and Laid the Foundations of Japan 知ってる!?悠久の時が流れる石の島～海を越え、日本の礎を築いた せとうち備讃諸島～ Shitteru!? Yūkyū no toki ga nagareru ishi no shima (umi o koe, Nihon no ishizue o kizuita Setouchi Bisan shotō)		Okayama	Kasaoka							
#080	Did You Know!? Islands of Stone where Time Flows Eternal: the Setouchi Bisan Islands that Crossed the Sea and Laid the Foundations of Japan 知ってる!?悠久の時が流れる石の島～海を越え、日本の礎を築いた せとうち備讃諸島～ Shitteru!? Yūkyū no toki ga nagareru ishi no shima (umi o koe, Nihon no ishizue o kizuita Setouchi Bisan shotō)		Kagawa	Marugame							
#080	Did You Know!? Islands of Stone where Time Flows Eternal: the Setouchi Bisan Islands that Crossed the Sea and Laid the Foundations of Japan 知ってる!?悠久の時が流れる石の島～海を越え、日本の礎を築いた せとうち備讃諸島～ Shitteru!? Yūkyū no toki ga nagareru ishi no shima (umi o koe, Nihon no ishizue o kizuita Setouchi Bisan shotō)		Kagawa	Shōdoshima							
#080	Did You Know!? Islands of Stone where Time Flows Eternal: the Setouchi Bisan Islands that Crossed the Sea and Laid the Foundations of Japan 知ってる!?悠久の時が流れる石の島～海を越え、日本の礎を築いた せとうち備讃諸島～ Shitteru!? Yūkyū no toki ga nagareru ishi no shima (umi o koe, Nihon no ishizue o kizuita Setouchi Bisan shotō)		Kagawa	Tonoshō							
#081	Awa, Hometown of Indigo: Calling upon that Superb Blue that Dyed all over Japan 藍のふるさと 阿波～日本中を染め上げた至高の青を訪ねて～ Ai no furusato Awa (Nihon-chū o someageta shikō no ao o tazunete)		Tokushima								
#082	The Towns where the Satsuma Samurai Lived: Walking in the Feet of the Samurai Residences 薩摩の武士が生きた町～武家屋敷群「麓」を歩く～ Satsuma no bushi ga ikita machi (buke yashiki-gun "fumoto" o aruku)		Kagoshima								
#083	Traditional “Ryūkyūan Cuisine”, “Awamori”, and “Performing Arts” of Okinawa that have Continued Unbroken since the Time of the Ryūkyū Kingdom 琉球王国時代から連綿と続く沖縄の伝統的な「琉球料理」と「泡盛」、そして「芸能」 Ryūkyū ōkoku jidai kara renmen to tsuzuku Okinawa no dentō-tekina "Ryūkyū ryōri" to "awamori", soshite "geinō"		Okinawa	Naha	Former Bell of the Shuri Castle Seiden (Bridge of Nations Bell)	Ryūkyūan Dance (ja); Kumi Odori		Stone Gate at Kami-Tempigu; Shuri Castle Site; Shikina-en; Shuri Castle Shoin - Sasunoma Gardens		Historic Sites around Kumemura; Shiimii festival; Usanmi (Offering); Historic Sites around Naha Port (ja); Kumemura 600th Anniversary Memorial Stele; Tenshikan Site; Ukanshin Cuisine; Uchayaudun Site (ja); Ryūkyū Awamori; Shuri Castle Treasury Site; Tōfuyō (ja); Kippan	
#083	Traditional “Ryūkyūan Cuisine”, “Awamori”, and “Performing Arts” of Okinawa that have Continued Unbroken since the Time of the Ryūkyū Kingdom 琉球王国時代から連綿と続く沖縄の伝統的な「琉球料理」と「泡盛」、そして「芸能」 Ryūkyū ōkoku jidai kara renmen to tsuzuku Okinawa no dentō-tekina "Ryūkyū ryōri" to "awamori", soshite "geinō"		Okinawa	Urasoe	Iso no Takau Tomb (ja); Ryūkyū Trading Port Byōbu; 43 Red Lacquer Serving Trays with Foil Paintings of Figured Landscapes etc. (Ryūkyūan Lacquerware)	Ryūkyūan Dance (ja); Kumi Odori		Iso Castle Site; Urasoe Castle Site; Makiminato (ja) Terabu no Gama (ja); Urasoe Yōdore; Stele in front of Urasoe Castle; Nakagami Hōsei Kaidō (Road of Shō Nei); Tomb of Tamagusuku Chōkun (ja) (Hentona Family Tomb)		Shiimii festival; Usanmi (Offering); Tōfuyō (ja)	
#084	Tales from the Sacred Land of Salmon: A Journey of Ten Thousand Years in the Nemuro Straits 「鮭の聖地」の物語～根室海峡一万年の道程～ "Sake no seichi" no monogatari (Nemuro kaikyō ichiman-nen no michinori)		Hokkaidō	Betsukai	Kaga Family Documents; Former Bekkai Village Eikidō (ja) Fūren Line Okiyukiusu Stop (ja); Assets relating to the Shibetsu Line (ja) (Okiyukiusu Station (ja))			Former Okiyukiusu Ekitei (ja)	Former Hokkaidō Development Commission (ja) Cannery	Notsuke Peninsula (ja); Notsuke Tsūkōya Site; Sake-toba (ja); Yamazuke Production Methods; Sake-izushi (ja) Culture; Coastal Rivers in the Nemuro Straits where Salmon and Trout Swim Upstream; Fishing in Notsuke Bay (ja) using Utase (ja) Trawling Nets; Cultural Assets relating to the Konsen Pilot Farm; Dairy Buildings of the Konsen Plateau (ja); Lattice-shaped Forest Windbreak of the Konsen Plateau (ja)	
#084	Tales from the Sacred Land of Salmon: A Journey of Ten Thousand Years in the Nemuro Straits 「鮭の聖地」の物語～根室海峡一万年の道程～ "Sake no seichi" no monogatari (Nemuro kaikyō ichiman-nen no michinori)		Hokkaidō	Nemuro	Paintings of Adam Laxman's Ship and of Washireirafurou		Goyōmai Shishi Kagura	Nemuro Peninsula Chashi Sites; Nishitsukigaoka Site		Excavated Artefacts of the Okhotsk Culture on the Nemuro Peninsula; Sake-toba (ja); Yamazuke Production Methods; Sake-izushi (ja) Culture; Coastal Rivers in the Nemuro Straits where Salmon and Trout Swim Upstream; Kotohira Jinja (ja); Usui Katsusaburō Shōten (ja) Sake Warehouse; Nemuro Straits Coastal Cannery Labels; Nemuro Kombu Harvesting	
#084	Tales from the Sacred Land of Salmon: A Journey of Ten Thousand Years in the Nemuro Straits 「鮭の聖地」の物語～根室海峡一万年の道程～ "Sake no seichi" no monogatari (Nemuro kaikyō ichiman-nen no michinori)		Hokkaidō	Rausu	Excavated Artefacts from the Matsunorigawa Hokugan Site			Tachiniusu Hokugan Chashi Site		Sake-toba (ja); Yamazuke Production Methods; Sake-izushi (ja) Culture; Coastal Rivers in the Nemuro Straits where Salmon and Trout Swim Upstream	
#084	Tales from the Sacred Land of Salmon: A Journey of Ten Thousand Years in the Nemuro Straits 「鮭の聖地」の物語～根室海峡一万年の道程～ "Sake no seichi" no monogatari (Nemuro kaikyō ichiman-nen no michinori)		Hokkaidō	Shibetsu	Votive Offerings at Shibetsu Jinja; Aizu Domain Samurai Graves			Shibetsu Sites (Ichanikarikariusu Site); Tabuyama Chashi Site; Assets relating to the Shibetsu Line (ja) (Former Nemuro Shibetsu Station (ja) Turntable)		Notsuke Peninsula (ja); Sake-toba (ja); Yamazuke Production Methods; Sake-izushi (ja) Culture; Coastal Rivers in the Nemuro Straits where Salmon and Trout Swim Upstream; Shibetsu Jinja; Coastal Barn Site; Dairy Buildings of the Konsen Plateau (ja); Lattice-shaped Forest Windbreak of the Konsen Plateau (ja)	
#085	Urushi Monogatari from Inner Nanbu: Traditional Techniques Transmitted in the Appi River Basin "奥南部"漆物語～安比川流域に受け継がれる伝統技術～ "Oku-Nanbu" urushi monogatari (Appi-gawa ryūiki ni uketsugareru dentō gijutsu)		Iwate	Hachimantai							
#085	Urushi Monogatari from Inner Nanbu: Traditional Techniques Transmitted in the Appi River Basin "奥南部"漆物語～安比川流域に受け継がれる伝統技術～ "Oku-Nanbu" urushi monogatari (Appi-gawa ryūiki ni uketsugareru dentō gijutsu)		Iwate	Ninohe							
#086	The 140-year History of Japanese Wine: Crystals of Japanese Culture Crafted with Domestic Grapes 日本ワイン140年史～国産ブドウで醸造する和文化の結晶～ Nihon wain hyaku yonjū-nen-shi (kokusan budō de jōzō suru wa bunka no kesshō)		Ibaraki	Ushiku							
#086	The 140-year History of Japanese Wine: Crystals of Japanese Culture Crafted with Domestic Grapes 日本ワイン140年史～国産ブドウで醸造する和文化の結晶～ Nihon wain hyaku yonjū-nen-shi (kokusan budō de jōzō suru wa bunka no kesshō)		Yamanashi	Kōshū							
#087	Kasamashiko: "Ceramic Tales" Spun by Blood-Brother Production Areas かさましこ～兄弟産地が紡ぐ“焼き物語”～ Kasamashiko (kyōdai sanchi ga tsumugu "yaki monogatari")		Tochigi	Mashiko							
#087	Kasamashiko: "Ceramic Tales" Spun by Blood-Brother Production Areas かさましこ～兄弟産地が紡ぐ“焼き物語”～ Kasamashiko (kyōdai sanchi ga tsumugu "yaki monogatari")		Ibaraki	Kasama							
#088	Mount Takao with its Aura of Mystery: Mulberry Capital Tales Spun through People's Prayers 霊気満山 高尾山～人々の祈りが紡ぐ桑都物語～ Reiki manzan Takaosan (hitobito no inori ga tsumugu Kuwa-to monogatari)		Tōkyō	Hachiōji							
#089	Tōkamachi, the Ultimate Snow Country: True Tales of Tremendous Snowfall 究極の雪国とおかまち ―真説!豪雪地ものがたりー; Kyūkyoku no yukiguni Tōkamachi (shinsetsu! gōsetsu-chi monogatari)		Niigata	Tōkamachi							
#090	Railways that Crossed the Sea: Railroad Wonders that Give the World Connectivity 海を越えた鉄道～世界へつながる 鉄路のキセキ～ Umi o koeta tetsudō (sekai e tsunagaru tetsuro no kiseki)		Shiga	Nagahama							
#090	Railways that Crossed the Sea: Railroad Wonders that Give the World Connectivity 海を越えた鉄道～世界へつながる 鉄路のキセキ～ Umi o koeta tetsudō (sekai e tsunagaru tetsuro no kiseki)		Fukui	Minamiechizen							
#090	Railways that Crossed the Sea: Railroad Wonders that Give the World Connectivity 海を越えた鉄道～世界へつながる 鉄路のキセキ～ Umi o koeta tetsudō (sekai e tsunagaru tetsuro no kiseki)		Fukui	Tsuruga							
#091	Mitake Shōsenkyō and the Origins of Kōshū Craftsmen: Towards Faith, Technique, and Advanced Technology Led by Crystal's Beating 甲州の匠の源流・御嶽昇仙峡～水晶の鼓動が導いた信仰と技、そして先進 ぎじゅつ技術へ～ Kōshū no takumi no genryū・Mitake Shōsenkyō (suishō no kodō ga michibiita shinkō to waza, soshite senshin gijutsu e)		Yamanashi	Kai	Wooden Statues of 500 Arhats; Seated Wooden Statue of Amida Nyorai; White Palanquin; Torii from Kanazakura Jinja (ja)			Mitake Shōsenkyō (ja)		Mitake Kodō (Kamezawa Route) Stone Items; Mitake Kodō; Former Rakan-ji (ja) Site	
#091	Mitake Shōsenkyō and the Origins of Kōshū Craftsmen: Towards Faith, Technique, and Advanced Technology Led by Crystal's Beating 甲州の匠の源流・御嶽昇仙峡～水晶の鼓動が導いた信仰と技、そして先進 ぎじゅつ技術へ～ Kōshū no takumi no genryū・Mitake Shōsenkyō (suishō no kodō ga michibiita shinkō to waza, soshite senshin gijutsu e)		Yamanashi	Kōfu	Entaku-ji (ja) Jizō dō			Mitake Shōsenkyō (ja); Tsubakuroiwa Dike (ja)		Mount Kinpu Five Shaku Rocks; Kanazakura Jinja (ja) Grand Kagura with Masks and Costumes; Osada Enemon Memorial Stele; Sacred Treasures of Kanazakura Jinja (ja); Yutani Jinja	
#092	Chikuma, Moon Capital: The Mysterious Moonscapes Created by the Obasute Rice Terraces, "The Moon over Each and Every Field" 月の都 千曲～姨捨の棚田がつくる摩訶不思議な月景色「田毎の月」～ Tsuki no miyako Chikuma (Obasute no tanada ga tsukuru maka fushigina tsuki geshiki "tagoto no tsuki")		Nagano	Chikuma							
#093	"Sacred Places of Sun and Earth" Connected by Ley Lines: A Town in which one Lives with Dragons, Shinshū Ueda - Shiodadaira レイラインがつなぐ「太陽と大地の聖地」～龍と生きるまち 信州上田・塩田平～ Rei rain ga tsunagu "taiyō to daichi no seichi" (ryū to ikiru machi Shinshū Ueda・Shiodadaira)		Nagano	Ueda							
#094	Japan's First "Travel Boom" Occasioned by Yaji-san and Kita-san, Travels in Sunshū: Kokkeibon and Ukiyo-e, Guide Books for Travel on the Tōkaidō 日本初「旅ブーム」を起こした弥次さん喜多さん、駿州の旅～滑稽本と浮世絵が描く東海道旅のガイドブック（道中記）～ Nihon-hatsu "tabi būmu" o okoshita Yaji-san Kita-san, Sunshū no tabi (kokkeibon to ukiyo-e ga kaku Tōkaidō tabi no gaidobukku (dōchū-ki))		Shizuoka	Fujieda							
#094	Japan's First "Travel Boom" Occasioned by Yaji-san and Kita-san, Travels in Sunshū: Kokkeibon and Ukiyo-e, Guide Books for Travel on the Tōkaidō 日本初「旅ブーム」を起こした弥次さん喜多さん、駿州の旅～滑稽本と浮世絵が描く東海道旅のガイドブック（道中記）～ Nihon-hatsu "tabi būmu" o okoshita Yaji-san Kita-san, Sunshū no tabi (kokkeibon to ukiyo-e ga kaku Tōkaidō tabi no gaidobukku (dōchū-ki))		Shizuoka	Shizuoka							
#095	Lake Biwa Canal, Waterway of Hope Connecting Kyōto and Ōtsu: A Moment in the Meiji Period one could have the Feel of a Stroll by Embarking on a Boat 京都と大津を繋ぐ希望の水路 琵琶湖疏水～舟に乗り、歩いて触れる明治のひととき～ Kyōto to Ōtsu o tsunagu kibō no suiro Biwako-sosui (fune ni nori, aruite fureru Meiji no hito-toki)		Shiga	Ōtsu							
#095	Lake Biwa Canal, Waterway of Hope Connecting Kyōto and Ōtsu: A Moment in the Meiji Period one could have the Feel of a Stroll by Embarking on a Boat 京都と大津を繋ぐ希望の水路 琵琶湖疏水～舟に乗り、歩いて触れる明治のひととき～ Kyōto to Ōtsu o tsunagu kibō no suiro Biwako-sosui (fune ni nori, aruite fureru Meiji no hito-toki)		Kyōto	Kyōto							
#096	Now we can Coexist with Females, Women's Kōya: A Sacred Place that Continues to Heal as it Watches over Transcendence of and Adaptation to Time 女性とともに今に息づく女人高野～時を超え、時に合わせて見守り続ける癒しの聖地～ Josei to tomo-ni ima ni ikizuku nyonin Kōya (toki o koe, toki ni awasete mimamori tsuzukeru iyashi no seichi)		Ōsaka	Kawachinagano	Kongō-ji		Kongō-ji				
#096	Now we can Coexist with Females, Women's Kōya: A Sacred Place that Continues to Heal as it Watches over Transcendence of and Adaptation to Time 女性とともに今に息づく女人高野～時を超え、時に合わせて見守り続ける癒しの聖地～ Josei to tomo-ni ima ni ikizuku nyonin Kōya (toki o koe, toki ni awasete mimamori tsuzukeru iyashi no seichi)		Nara	Uda	Murō-ji						
#096	Now we can Coexist with Females, Women's Kōya: A Sacred Place that Continues to Heal as it Watches over Transcendence of and Adaptation to Time 女性とともに今に息づく女人高野～時を超え、時に合わせて見守り続ける癒しの聖地～ Josei to tomo-ni ima ni ikizuku nyonin Kōya (toki o koe, toki ni awasete mimamori tsuzukeru iyashi no seichi)		Wakayama	Kōya				Kōyasan chōishi-michi		Makio-michi (ja); Fudōzaka Entrance Nyonin-dō; Take Jizō; Nyonin-michi (ja)	
#096	Now we can Coexist with Females, Women's Kōya: A Sacred Place that Continues to Heal as it Watches over Transcendence of and Adaptation to Time 女性とともに今に息づく女人高野～時を超え、時に合わせて見守り続ける癒しの聖地～ Josei to tomo-ni ima ni ikizuku nyonin Kōya (toki o koe, toki ni awasete mimamori tsuzukeru iyashi no seichi)		Wakayama	Kudoyama	Jison-in					Breast-Shaped Ema	
#097	"Itami Morohaku" and the "Purity of Nada": Famous Breweries where Kudari-zake was Born, Itami and Nada-Gogō 「伊丹諸白」と「灘の生一本」～下り酒が生んだ銘醸地、伊丹と灘五郷～ "Itami Morohaku" to "Nada no kiippon" (kudari-zake ga unda meijōchi, Itami to Nada-Gogō)		Hyōgo								
#098	Let's Not Let it Slip Anymore: Go Beyond "Turtle Rapids", Heart of the Old Tatsuta Road もう、すべらせない！！～龍田古道の心臓部「亀の瀬」を越えてゆけ～ Mō, suberasenai!! (Tatsuta Kodō no shinzō-bu "kame no se" o koete yuke)		Nara	Sangō							
#098	Let's Not Let it Slip Anymore: Go Beyond "Turtle Rapids", Heart of the Old Tatsuta Road もう、すべらせない！！～龍田古道の心臓部「亀の瀬」を越えてゆけ～ Mō, suberasenai!! (Tatsuta Kodō no shinzō-bu "kame no se" o koete yuke)		Ōsaka	Kashiwara							
#099	Katsuragi Shūgen: Birthplace of Shugendō 「葛城修験」～里人とともに守り伝える修験道はじまりの地～ Katsuragi shūgen (satobito to tomoni mamori tsutaeru shūgendō hajimari no chi)		Wakayama	Hashimoto							
#099	Katsuragi Shūgen: Birthplace of Shugendō 「葛城修験」～里人とともに守り伝える修験道はじまりの地～ Katsuragi shūgen (satobito to tomoni mamori tsutaeru shūgendō hajimari no chi)		Wakayama	Iwade	Negoro-ji			Negoro-ji			
#099	Katsuragi Shūgen: Birthplace of Shugendō 「葛城修験」～里人とともに守り伝える修験道はじまりの地～ Katsuragi shūgen (satobito to tomoni mamori tsutaeru shūgendō hajimari no chi)		Wakayama	Katsuragi	Amidadō			Niutsuhime Jinja Precinct			
#099	Katsuragi Shūgen: Birthplace of Shugendō 「葛城修験」～里人とともに守り伝える修験道はじまりの地～ Katsuragi shūgen (satobito to tomoni mamori tsutaeru shūgendō hajimari no chi)		Wakayama	Kinokawa	Kokawa-dera (ja); Kumano Jinja						
#099	Katsuragi Shūgen: Birthplace of Shugendō 「葛城修験」～里人とともに守り伝える修験道はじまりの地～ Katsuragi shūgen (satobito to tomoni mamori tsutaeru shūgendō hajimari no chi)		Wakayama	Wakayama	Kada Kasuga Jinja (ja)			Shinja Pond; Jōgyō-ji		Tomogashima Johon Cave	
#099	Katsuragi Shūgen: Birthplace of Shugendō 「葛城修験」～里人とともに守り伝える修験道はじまりの地～ Katsuragi shūgen (satobito to tomoni mamori tsutaeru shūgendō hajimari no chi)		Ōsaka	Chihayaakasaka							
#099	Katsuragi Shūgen: Birthplace of Shugendō 「葛城修験」～里人とともに守り伝える修験道はじまりの地～ Katsuragi shūgen (satobito to tomoni mamori tsutaeru shūgendō hajimari no chi)		Ōsaka	Hannan							
#099	Katsuragi Shūgen: Birthplace of Shugendō 「葛城修験」～里人とともに守り伝える修験道はじまりの地～ Katsuragi shūgen (satobito to tomoni mamori tsutaeru shūgendō hajimari no chi)		Ōsaka	Izumi	Matsuo-dera (ja); Sefuku-ji (ja)			Matsuo-dera		Sasa-odori	
#099	Katsuragi Shūgen: Birthplace of Shugendō 「葛城修験」～里人とともに守り伝える修験道はじまりの地～ Katsuragi shūgen (satobito to tomoni mamori tsutaeru shūgendō hajimari no chi)		Ōsaka	Izumisano	Oku Family Residence			Hinenoshō (ja); Hibashiri Jinja; Mount Inunaki (ja) (Shippōryū-ji (ja))	Rural Landscape of Taiboku		
#099	Katsuragi Shūgen: Birthplace of Shugendō 「葛城修験」～里人とともに守り伝える修験道はじまりの地～ Katsuragi shūgen (satobito to tomoni mamori tsutaeru shūgendō hajimari no chi)		Ōsaka	Kanan							
#099	Katsuragi Shūgen: Birthplace of Shugendō 「葛城修験」～里人とともに守り伝える修験道はじまりの地～ Katsuragi shūgen (satobito to tomoni mamori tsutaeru shūgendō hajimari no chi)		Ōsaka	Kashiwara							
#099	Katsuragi Shūgen: Birthplace of Shugendō 「葛城修験」～里人とともに守り伝える修験道はじまりの地～ Katsuragi shūgen (satobito to tomoni mamori tsutaeru shūgendō hajimari no chi)		Ōsaka	Kawachinagano	Iwawaki-ji (ja)		Kōtaki-ji (ja) Sumiyaki Fudō	Mount Iwawaki (ja)			
#099	Katsuragi Shūgen: Birthplace of Shugendō 「葛城修験」～里人とともに守り伝える修験道はじまりの地～ Katsuragi shūgen (satobito to tomoni mamori tsutaeru shūgendō hajimari no chi)		Ōsaka	Kishiwada			Katsuragi-odori	Ogami Jinja (ja) (Amefuri Falls)			
#099	Katsuragi Shūgen: Birthplace of Shugendō 「葛城修験」～里人とともに守り伝える修験道はじまりの地～ Katsuragi shūgen (satobito to tomoni mamori tsutaeru shūgendō hajimari no chi)		Ōsaka	Misaki							
#099	Katsuragi Shūgen: Birthplace of Shugendō 「葛城修験」～里人とともに守り伝える修験道はじまりの地～ Katsuragi shūgen (satobito to tomoni mamori tsutaeru shūgendō hajimari no chi)		Nara	Gojō	Sōkoku-ji; Daitaku-ji (ja)						
#099	Katsuragi Shūgen: Birthplace of Shugendō 「葛城修験」～里人とともに守り伝える修験道はじまりの地～ Katsuragi shūgen (satobito to tomoni mamori tsutaeru shūgendō hajimari no chi)		Nara	Gose				Mount Kongō			
#099	Katsuragi Shūgen: Birthplace of Shugendō 「葛城修験」～里人とともに守り伝える修験道はじまりの地～ Katsuragi shūgen (satobito to tomoni mamori tsutaeru shūgendō hajimari no chi)		Nara	Kashiba				Donzurubō (ja)			
#099	Katsuragi Shūgen: Birthplace of Shugendō 「葛城修験」～里人とともに守り伝える修験道はじまりの地～ Katsuragi shūgen (satobito to tomoni mamori tsutaeru shūgendō hajimari no chi)		Nara	Katsuragi	Taima-dera; Takao-ji			Taima-dera Nakanobō			
#099	Katsuragi Shūgen: Birthplace of Shugendō 「葛城修験」～里人とともに守り伝える修験道はじまりの地～ Katsuragi shūgen (satobito to tomoni mamori tsutaeru shūgendō hajimari no chi)		Nara	Ōji							
#100	Get the Flavour of Masuda, a Masterpiece of Mediaeval Japan: Resplendent Once More in the Age of the Local 中世日本の傑作 益田を味わう～地方の時代に輝き再び～ Chūsei Nihon no kessaku Masuda o ajiwau (chihō no jidai ni kagayaki futatabi)		Shimane	Masuda	Fukuō-ji Thirteen-Storey Stone Pagoda; Manpuku-ji (ja); Someha Amenoiwakatsu Jinja; Ikō-ji (ja); Portrait of Masuda Kanetaka (ja), Colour on Paper; Portrait of Masuda Motoyoshi (ja), Colour on Silk			Nanao Castle Site (ja); Miyake Odoi Site (ja); Manpuku-ji (ja); Ikō-ji (ja); Nakazu Higashihara Site (ja); Mediaeval Imaichi Site	Kushirokahime Jinja (ja) Honden; Masuda City Museum of History and Folklore	Kushirokahime Jinja (ja); Fukuō-ji; Taiki-an; Sumiyoshi Jinja; Myōgi-ji; Kyōon-ji; Nakahara Family Residence; Migita Sake Storehouse; Senkō-ji; Tsumo Mine Site; Ōtoshinomoto Site; Shinpōzan Hachimangū; Hikimi Mountain Forest; Takatsu River and Hikimi River (ja); Masuda River (ja) Kuwabara Sake Brewery; Salted Sweetfish Guts (ja)	
#101	Eternal History of the Volcanoes of Iwami: Towards a Journey of Encounter with "Jōmon Forests" and "Silver Mountains" 石見の火山が伝える悠久の歴史～”縄文の森” ”銀の山”と出逢える旅へ～ Iwami no kazan ga tsutaeru yūkyū no rekishi ("Jōmon no mori" "gin no yama" to deaeru tabi e)		Shimane	Ōda							
#102	Birthplace of Japan Red: Bitchū Fukiya, Town of Bengara and Copper 「ジャパンレッド」発祥の地～弁柄と銅の町・備中吹屋～ "Japan reddo" hasshō no chi (bengara to akagane no machi・Bitchū Fukiya)		Okayama	Takahashi	Former Katayama Family Residence (ja); Former Hirokane Family Residence; Former Fukiya Elementary School Building (ja)		Bitchū kagura (ja)		Takahashi Fukiya Preservation District for Groups of Traditional Buildings; Nishie Family Residence	Fukiya Kyōdokan; Bengara-kan (ja); Yoshioka Copper Mine Site; Sasaune Mine Tunnel (ja); San Jinja Site; Yama Jinja; Kogane Castle Site; Enmei-ji (ja); Dōei-ji; Kōfu Nagaya Site; Old Fukiya Road; Remains of the minecart railway; Remains of the Ikawa Power Plant; Images of Koshiori Jizō; Tools for Sekishū Tile-making (ja); Katayama Family Documents	
#103	Nagasaki Kaidō that Spread Sugar Culture: Sugar Road 砂糖文化を広めた長崎街道～シュガーロード～ Satō bunka o hirometa Nagasaki kaidō (shugā rōdo)		Fukuoka	Izuka						Nagasaki Kaidō; Famous Confection Hiyoko (ja); Chidori Manjū (ja); Nanban Ōrai	
#103	Nagasaki Kaidō that Spread Sugar Culture: Sugar Road 砂糖文化を広めた長崎街道～シュガーロード～ Satō bunka o hirometa Nagasaki kaidō (shugā rōdo)		Fukuoka	Kitakyūshū				Fukuju-ji (ja)		Nagasaki Kaidō; Tokiwa Bridge (ja); Kogiku Manjū (ja); Konpeitō; Kurogane Yōkan	
#103	Nagasaki Kaidō that Spread Sugar Culture: Sugar Road 砂糖文化を広めた長崎街道～シュガーロード～ Satō bunka o hirometa Nagasaki kaidō (shugā rōdo)		Saga	Ogi					Muraoka Sōhonpo Yōkan Museum (ja)	Nagasaki Kaidō; Fucha Cuisine (ja); Ogi Yōkan (ja)	
#103	Nagasaki Kaidō that Spread Sugar Culture: Sugar Road 砂糖文化を広めた長崎街道～シュガーロード～ Satō bunka o hirometa Nagasaki kaidō (shugā rōdo)		Saga	Saga						Nagasaki Kaidō; Marubōro (ja); Sugadai; Consciousness of Confection Methods (Tsuruya Documents)	
#103	Nagasaki Kaidō that Spread Sugar Culture: Sugar Road 砂糖文化を広めた長崎街道～シュガーロード～ Satō bunka o hirometa Nagasaki kaidō (shugā rōdo)		Saga	Ureshino					Ureshino City Shiotatsu Important Preservation District for Groups of Traditional Buildings	Nagasaki Kaidō; Ikkōkō (ja); Kinkatō (ja)	
#103	Nagasaki Kaidō that Spread Sugar Culture: Sugar Road 砂糖文化を広めた長崎街道～シュガーロード～ Satō bunka o hirometa Nagasaki kaidō (shugā rōdo)		Nagasaki	Isahaya						Nagasaki Kaidō; Isahaya Okoshi (ja); Isahaya Okoshi Tools	
#103	Nagasaki Kaidō that Spread Sugar Culture: Sugar Road 砂糖文化を広めた長崎街道～シュガーロード～ Satō bunka o hirometa Nagasaki kaidō (shugā rōdo)		Nagasaki	Nagasaki			Dances Dedicated during Nagasaki Kunchi	Dejima Dutch Trading Post		Nagasaki Kaidō; Castella; Aruheitō (ja)	
#103	Nagasaki Kaidō that Spread Sugar Culture: Sugar Road 砂糖文化を広めた長崎街道～シュガーロード～ Satō bunka o hirometa Nagasaki kaidō (shugā rōdo)		Nagasaki	Ōmura						Nagasaki Kaidō; Hekohazushi Okoshi (ja); Okoshi Production Tools; Ōmura-zushi (ja)	
#104	The Story of Masons who Developed Yatsushiro: Masonry Legacy in the Town of Masons 八代を創造した石工たちの軌跡～石工の郷に息づく石造りのレガシー～ Yatsushiro o tagayashita ishiku-tachi no kiseki (ishiku no sato ni ikizuku ishizukuri no regashī)		Kumamoto	Yatsushiro	Kannai Bridge; Former Gunchiku (ja) New Land Sluice Gates and Land Reclamation Levee; Kajiya Upper, Middle, and Lower Bridges; Rokuro Bridge; Kasamatsu Bridge; Akamatsu Megane Bridge (No.1); Group of Megane Bridges		Ozayabushi/Ozaya Meisho; Female Sumō (ja); Shibakuchibō-odori	Mizushima (Shiranui and Mizushima); Mugishima Castle (ja) (Yatsushiro Castle Sites); Yatsushiro Castle (ja) (Yatsushiro Castle Sites); Ozaya Sluice Gates; Iwanaga Sangorō's Grave (ja); Shiragadake Natural Stone Bridge	Gunchiku (ja) Niban-chō Sluice Gate	Shiroshima; Shōga Rice Terrace in Bishō District; Bunsei Jinja; Tanigawa Bridge; Common Rushes and Common Rush Wares; Twisted Tōrō (Wakamiya Jinja (ja)); Twisted Tōrō (Sugawara Jinja)	

== See also ==
- List of World Heritage Sites in Japan
- Cultural Properties of Japan
- Hokkaidō Heritage
