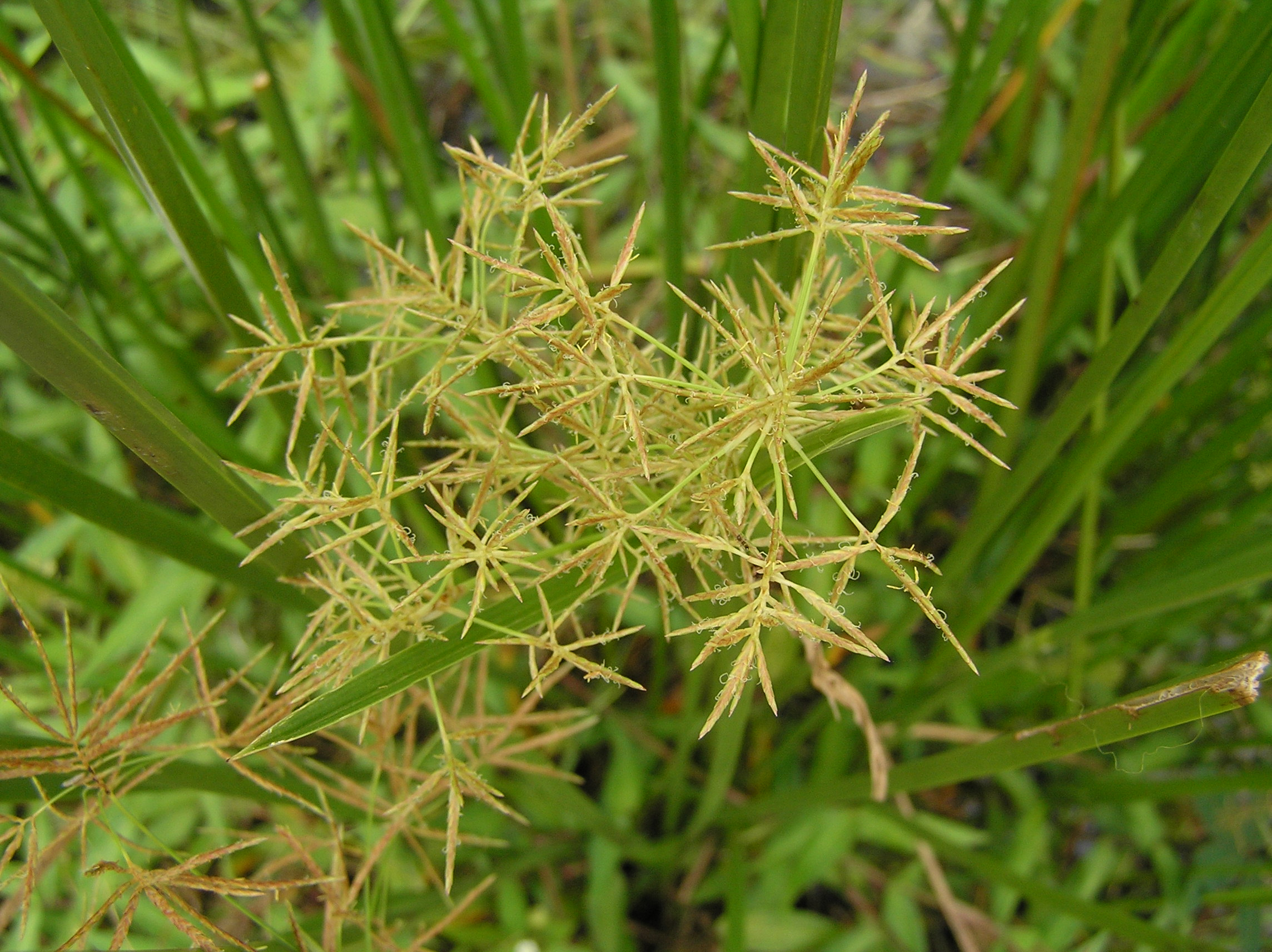

Scientific classification
- Kingdom: Plantae
- Clade: Tracheophytes
- Clade: Angiosperms
- Clade: Monocots
- Clade: Commelinids
- Order: Poales
- Family: Cyperaceae
- Genus: Cyperus
- Species: C. malaccensis

Binomial name
- Cyperus malaccensis Lam. 1791

Subspecies
- Cyperus malaccensis subsp. malaccensis

Synonyms
- Cyperus tegetiformis For subsp. malaccensis

= Cyperus malaccensis =

Species of plant

Cyperus malaccensis or short-leaved Malacca galingale is a species of flowering plant in the sedge family. It is native to South Asia and Oceania.

== Uses ==
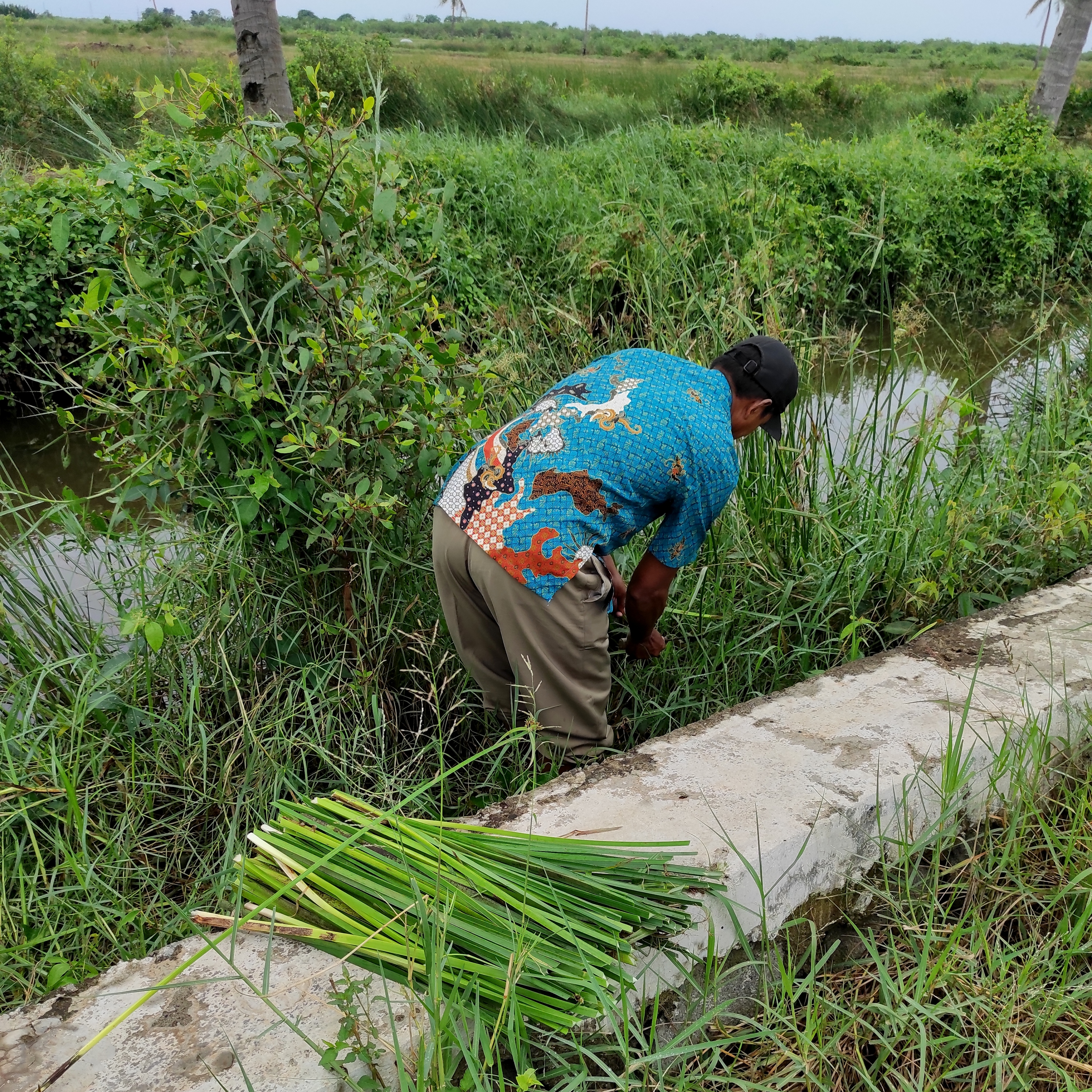
Collecting stems for tying purposes. Muaragembong, Bekasi, West Java

It is used in packaging goods in South China, mainly before the 1980s. At that time people packaged goods by wrapping them in sedge. It was common to use a long loop to tie up the package, to aid carrying with the index finger. It was mostly replaced by plastic bags but is still used to package zongzi and Chinese mitten crab. However, liquid in the food may drip out when walking, which led to the use of the plastic bags. There are few people left growing and selling it.

For packaging dry goods, Cyperus malaccensis can provide a cheap, biodegradable and readily available alternative to plastic bags. In 2007 a Hong Kong student group interested in environmentalism called Greeners Action began a campaign wherein they hoped that more than 130 shops in 6 Hong Kong markets would use the sedge instead of plastic bags.

It is planted in the land between the sea water and fresh water, mainly in Vietnam, and processed in Dongguan.

== See also ==
- List of Cyperus species
