= Maihara, Shiga =

Dissolved municipality in Shiga prefecture, Japan

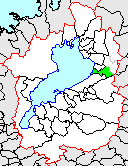
Location of Maihara

Maihara (米原町, Maihara-chō) was a town located in Sakata District, Shiga Prefecture, Japan.

As of 2003, the town had an estimated population of 12,212 and a density of 285.46 persons per km^{2}. The total area was 42.78 km^{2}.

On February 14, 2005, Maihara, along with the towns of Ibuki and Santō (all from Sakata District), was merged to create the city of Maibara.

It has developed as a traffic junction. In Edo period, there were Samegai-juku and Banba-juku. During the Meiji period, a large train station opened in the town, but it was named Maibara, not Maihara (see rendaku). Many Japanese people confused the town's name and the station's name, to the point where eventually, Maibara was adopted as the official name of the new, merged city.
