= Kyōgoku clan ruins =

Archaeological sites in Japan

- 京極氏遺跡 (Japanese)
- Kyōgoku clan ruins Kyōgoku clan ruins (Japan)
- 35°23′40″N 136°24′39″E
- Periods: Sengoku period
- Location: Maibara, Shiga, Japan
- Region: Kansai region

Site notes
- Public access: Yes (park)

The Kyōgoku clan ruins (京極氏遺跡, Kyōgoku-shi iseki) is a group archaeological sites in the Johei neighborhood of the city of Maibara, Shiga prefecture in the Kansai region of Japan, connected with the Muromachi period rulers of northern Ōmi province, the Kyōgoku clans. The sites have protected as a National Historic Site from 2004.

== Overview ==
The Kyōgoku clan is a cadet branch of the Sasaki clan. During the Kamakura period, Sasaki Nobutsuna rose to prominence during the Jōkyū War. His fourth son, Ujinobu, took the name of "Kyōgoku" after his residence in the Kyōgoku quarter of Kyoto, and inherited extensive estates in Echi, Inukami, Sakata, Ika, Asai, and Takashima districts of northern Ōmi. However, despite controlling half of the province, the office of shugo was held by another cadet branch of the Sasaki clan, the Rokkaku clan. The two clans were frequently in conflict. In 1505, Kyōgoku Takakiyo relocated his seat from Kashibara to the slopes of Mount Ibuki, fortifying an existing mountain temple, Johei-ji, and building a new jōkamachi, including a settlement for his retainers. However, in 1523, the Kyōgoku clan was weakened by internal conflicts, and much of their territory by seized by Azai Sukemasa.

== Kyōgoku Castle (Jōheiji-kan) ruins ==
The Joheiji-kan ruins cover a site approximately 250 meters north-to-south by 170 meters east-to-west at an elevation of 340 meters. This was the main residential and administrative complex for the clan, and contained numerous buildings, along with the Ibuki Jinja, a Shinto shrine, which still exists. The complex and the castle town were separated by a moat. The ruins of a Japanese garden centered on two ponds with numerous garden stones also still exists. When the site was excavated, the foundations of two buildings, a main building with a wide veranda, and a smaller building of unknown purpose were found. Also discovered was a large number of pottery and ceramic shards, which included many shards of celadon and white porcelain from China. The site is regarded as significant to the history of Japanese gardening and to provide insights into the actual living conditions of the Sengoku daimyō.

Outside the southern moat were the residences of high-ranking samurai retainers, and further south were the general residences and shops of the castle town itself.

== Jōhei-ji Castle ruins ==
The defensive redoubt of the Kyōgoku was located on the mountain ridge behind the Jōheiji-kan, with numerous enclosures protected by dry moats and earthen ramparts, connected by twisting, narrow passages, and pits dug to hinder then progress of any attackers. The highest main enclosure was on a ridge extending south from Mont Ibuki at an elevation of 669 meters. From name of the castle, it is assumed that the original temple of Johei-ji was located in this area, but no trace remains.

== Yakata-ji ruins ==
The National Historic Site designation also includes the ruins of a Buddhist temple located at an elevation of 700 meters on a right extending south from Mount Ibuki. In relation to the ruins of Jōheiji Castle, it is on the west side, across a valley. The temple is mentioned in historical documents, such as the Nihon Sandai Jitsuroku in an entry dated 878 AD, which states that the temple was founded by a mountain ascetic named Sanshu in the Ninju era (851–854). It was one of four ancient temples once located on the mountain. Archaeological excavations have found pottery shards from the 13th through 15th centuries, as well as Buddhist-related objects such as incense burners, vases, and portions of statues.

In 1465, Kyōgoku Masakata visited the temple in 1495 Kyōgoku Takakiyo fortified it; therefore it served as a castle for the Kyōgoku clan from before the construction of the Joheiji-kan in 1505. The grounds measures 300 meters north-to-south and 250 meters east-to-west, and there is a flat enclosure 59 meters north-to-south by 68 meters east-to-west in the center. A cornerstone with a diameter of 90 cm has been found at the site of the Main Hall, but the remains are not well preserved and the structure of the building is unknown. The foundations for other structures, including the South Gate, and the remains of later fortifications, such as dry moats, embankments, and pits have also been found. As with the main Jōhei-ji Castle portion of the site, the fortifications were remodeled by the Asakura in 1570.

== Subsequent fate ==
The Kyōgoku clan abandoned the castle in 1523. It was briefly occupied by Azai Nagamasa in 1570 and was repaired with the assistances of the Asakura clan in anticipation of an invasion by Oda Nobunaga. However, the Azai were defeated at the Battle of Anegawa later that year, and the castle was subsequently abandoned again without having seen any combat. The site is located about 12 minutes by car from Ōmi-Nagaoka Station on the JR East Tōkaidō Main Line.

== See also ==
- List of Historic Sites of Japan (Shiga)
