= CA82 =

CA82 or CA-82 may refer to:

- California State Route 82, a highway in the U.S. State of California
- Samegai Station, a railway station in Maibara, Japan (station code CA82)
- Caldwell 82, a star cluster
