= Kitabatake Tomoyuki =

Japanese court noble

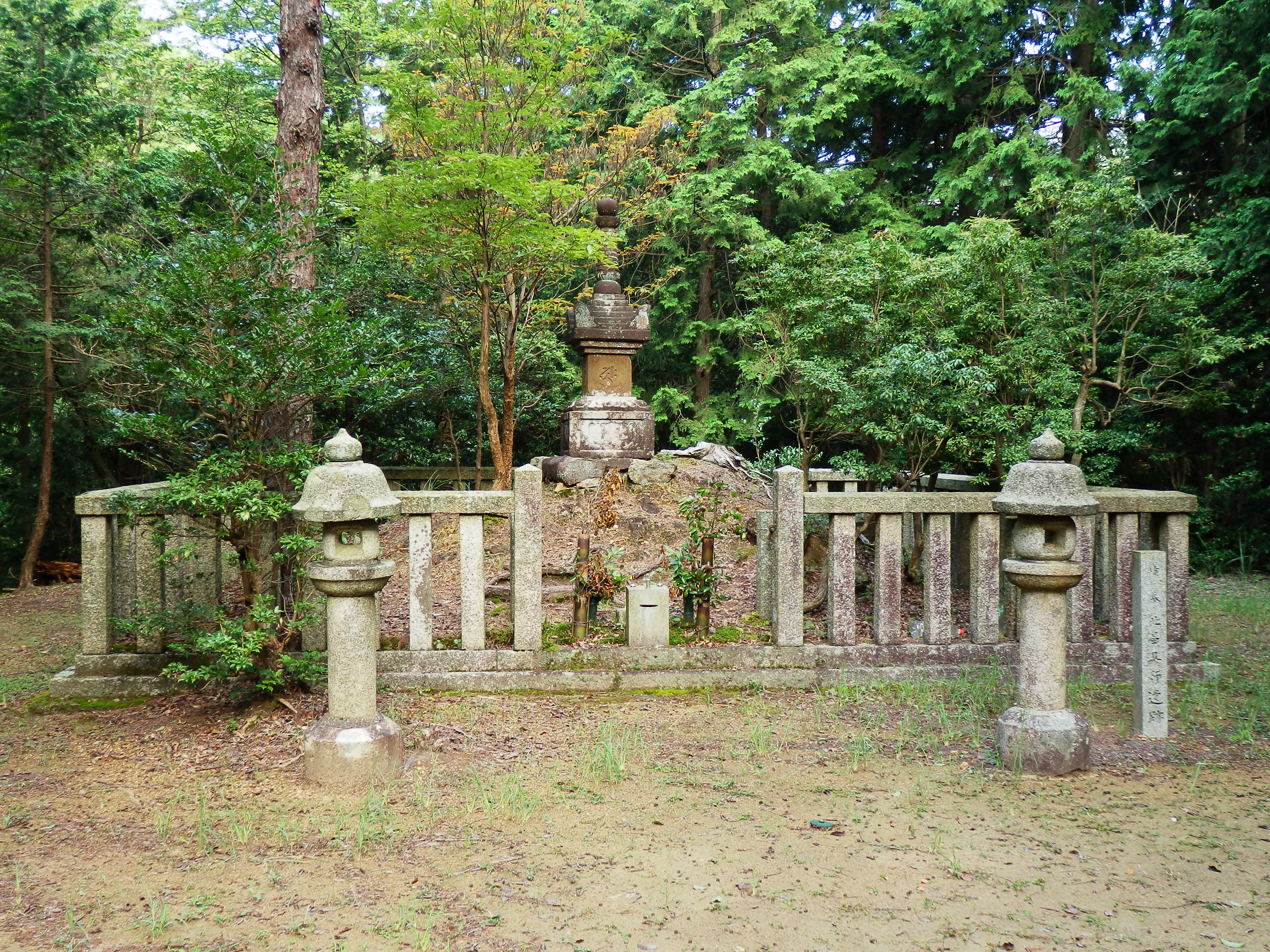
- Grave of Kitabatake Tomoyuki
- Born: 1290; Kyoto, Japan
- Died: July 12, 1332 (aged 41–42); Maibara, Shiga, Japan

Kitabatake Tomoyuki (北畠具行; 1290 – July 12, 1332) was a Japanese court noble during the late Kamakura period, who was executed for his role in the Genkō War, a failed attempt to overthrow the Kamakura shogunate.

== Biography ==
Kitabatake Tomoyuki was the grandson of Kitabatake Masaie, founder of the Kitabatake line, and a second cousin to Kitabatake Chikafusa. Noted for his ability as a waka poet, Tomoyuki rose to the court rank of Junior Second Rank and the title of Gon-Chūnagon (provisional middle councilor) in the court of Emperor Go-Daigo. In 1331, he resigned his official posts and took the tonsure, becoming a priest due to the death of Prince Tokiyoshi, Go-Daigo's second son. However, he remained active in court politics, and was an early member of the plot against the Kamakura shogunate known as the Genkō War.

Go-Daigo sought to remove the Kamakura Shogunate, which had ruled Japan as a de facto military government since 1185, and restore power to civilian government under the Imperial House in Kyoto. From 1331, he actively began to recruit anti-shogunate supporters, especially from the military class and encouraged them to rebel. However, the plot was betrayed when his trusted adviser Fujiwara Sadafusa alerted the shogunate, who dispatched troops to Kyoto to suppress the uprising. Go-Daigo fled Kyoto with the Imperial Regalia and sought refuge in Mount Kasagi, a secluded monastery overlooking the Kizu River. He later managed to escape Kasagi when it was attacked by Kamakura troops in the Siege of Kasagi, but was soon apprehended and was subsequently exiled to the Oki Islands and replaced on the throne by Emperor Kōgon, the first Emperor of the "Northern Court", setting the stage for the upcoming Nanboku-chō period.

During this conflict, Kitabatake Tomoyuki was also arrested, and ordered to be taken to Kamakura for trial under escort by troops led by Sasaki Takauji. While traveling along the Nakasendō highway, Sasaki revealed that there would be no trial, but that his orders were to kill his prisoner as soon as they departed Kyoto. Per the Masukagami chronicle, Kitabatake Tomoyuki expressed his gratitude for Sasaki's courteous treatment thus far, and Sasaki admitted that he was reluctant to follow his orders, even through he disliked the kuge since they had always been insulting to him. Sasaki permitted Tomoyuki to stay at the temple of Tokugen-in at Kashiwabara-juku in Ōmi Province (now part of Maibara, Shiga) for a month, while a messenger was sent to Kamakura with an urgent plea for clemency. The plea was denied, and Tomoyuki was executed by beheading.

In 1347, a 204-cm hōkyōintō gravestone was erected on the summit of Mount Maruyama, 700 meters south of Tokugen-in. The grave was designated a National Historic Site in 1930. Tokugen-in is about a 30-minute walk from Kashiwabara Station on the JR Central Tōkaidō Main Line.
