= Santō, Shiga =

Dissolved municipality in Shiga prefecture, Japan

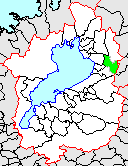
Location of Santo

Santō (山東町, Santō-chō) was a town located in Sakata District, Shiga Prefecture, Japan. There was Kashiwabara-juku in Edo period.

== Population ==
As of 2003, the town had an estimated population of 13,393 and a density of 252.17 persons per km^{2}. The total area was 53.11 km^{2}.

== History ==
On February 14, 2005, Santō, along with the towns of Maihara and Ibuki (all from Sakata District), was merged to create the city of Maibara.
