= Kamaha Castle =

Historical Japanese castle in Maibara

- 鎌刃城
- Maibara, Shiga Prefecture, Japan
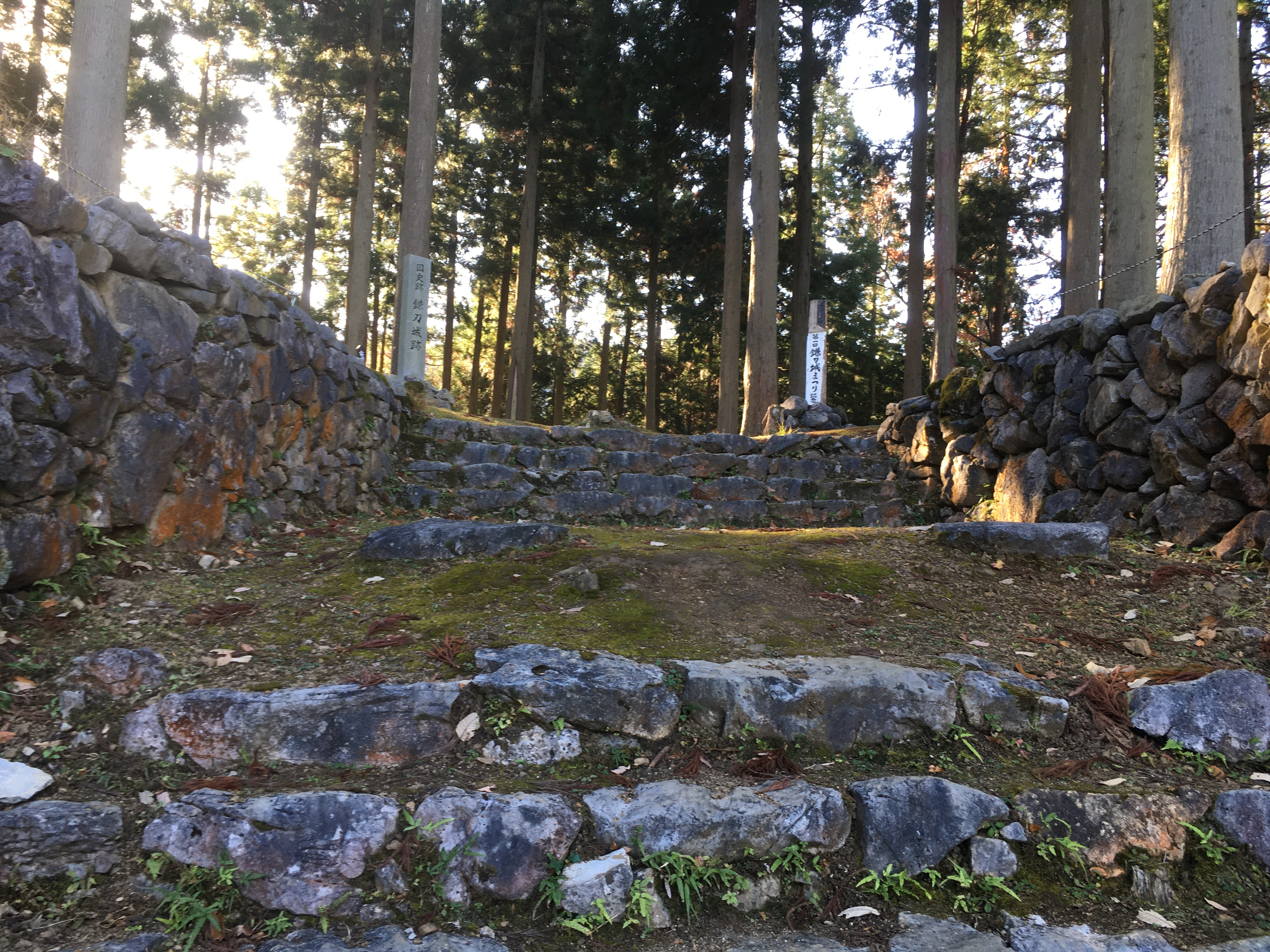
- Kamaha Castle ruins

Site information
- Type: yamashiro-style Japanese castle
- Open to the public: yes (no public facilities)
- Condition: ruins

Location
- Kamaha Castle Kamaha Castle (Japan)
- Coordinates: 35°17′49.4″N 136°18′55.6″E

Site history
- Built: 15th century
- Built by: Hori clan
- In use: Sengoku period
- Demolished: 1574

Kamaha Castle (鎌刃城, Kamaha jō) was a Sengoku period yamashiro-style Japanese castle located in the Banba neighborhood of the city of Maibara, Shiga Prefecture, in the Kansai region of Japan. Its ruins have been protected as a National Historic Site since 2005.

== Overview ==
Kamaha Castle is located on a sharp ridge extending westward from the Ryōzen mountains at an elevation of about 200 meters. The castle controls a narrow valley between Lake Biwa and the Sawayama Mountains, which is connected by the Surihari Pass with Sekigahara, Gifu. The Nakasendō highway runs through this gap, connecting Kyoto with eastern Japan, and Banba-juku, which served as the jōkamachi of this castle, was one of the post stations on the route. The castle extends for about 400 meters east-to-west by 500 meters north-to-south, making it the second largest in this region after Odani Castle. The inner bailey is a trapezoid-shaped terrace 40 meters long by 30 meter wide, with a yagura watchtower. Most of the walls of this central keep were faced with stone. The main gate of the castle faced the town of Banba-juku. The central keep was protected by a series of seven enclosures with earthen ramparts and dry moats on the north ridge, two on the south ridge and eight on the west ridge. The foundations of a large building with a basement has been found in one of the enclosures on the northern ridge, with a large number of iron nails. It is possible that this may have been intended to be a tenshu of the castle.

During the Muromachi period, much of Ōmi Province was controlled by the Rokkaku clan and Kyōgoku clan, both of whom were descendants of Sasaki clan. After the Ōnin War of 1467 to 1477, the Rokkaku clan gradually grew in power, defying the Ashikaga Shogunate, and by the Sengoku period had emerged as a strong regional power under the warlord Rokkaku Sadayori. On the other hand, the Kyōgoku clan, who had remained loyal to the shogunate and who had been awarded with posts such as shugo of Ōmi, Izumo, Oki and Hida, gradually lost power and by the Sengoku period were sandwiched in a small territory in-between the aggressive Rokkaku and the equally aggressive Asai Sukemasa based at Odani Castle. In 1524, Asai Sukemasa, with the support of the Asakura clan in Echizen Province seized the Kyōgoku territories in northern Ōmi. The Kyōgoku remaining in southern Ōmi continued to resist.

Kamaha Castle was built at some unknown date in the 15th century by the Hori clan. The Hori had ruled the area around Maibara since the Kamakura period and were part of the alliance of minor warlords who supported Asai Sukemasa. In 1538, the castle was taken by Rokkaku Sadayori and after the death of Asai Sukemasa, the clan was forced to pledge fealty to the Rokkaku. However, after the death of Rokkaku Sadayori, the clan fell into internal conflict, and seizing the opportunity, Asai Nagamasa defeated the Rokkaku armies in the 1560 Battle of Norada and seized most of northern Ōmi. He rebuilt Kamaha Castle using the most advanced contemporary technology as it was on the new front line between the Asai and Rokkaku territories, and the Hori clan transferred their fealty to the Asai.

Meanwhile, Oda Nobunaga had risen to power in central Japan. Allied with Asai Nagamasa, he swept aside the Rokkaku clan at Kannonji Castle and marched on Kyoto. In 1570, Nobunaga turned his attention against the Asakura clan. Asai Nagamasa wavered in his support for Nobunaga and his treaty obligations with the Asakura, and eventually decided to side with the Asakura. However, as the Hori clan had defected to the Oda side, Nobunaga was able to avoid getting trapped between the Asakura and Asai forces and was able to retreat to his stronghold at Gifu Castle. Oda Nobunaga returned to northern Ōmi the following year with a larger force and decisively defeated the Asai at the Battle of Anegawa. The Asai attacked Kamaha Castle several times, but with the assistance of Hashiba Hideyoshi, the Hori were able to withstand these attacks. After the defeat of the Asakura clan in 1573, Nobunaga allowed the Hori to keep their territory, but they were made subordinate to Hideyoshi. The Hori were dissatisfied with this arrangement, and were dispossessed in 1574. At that time, Kamaha Castle was abandoned. As there was no longer any border for it to defend, it no longer served a purpose.

Nothing remains of the castle today but some fragments of stone walls. The castle was listed as one of the Continued Top 100 Japanese Castles in 2017, a list intended as a sequel of Top 100 Japanese Castles.

The ruins are located a 45 minutes walk from south edge of Banba-juku, which it itself a ten-minute drive from the Maibara Interchange on the Meishin Expressway.

== See also ==
- List of Historic Sites of Japan (Shiga)
