= Ibuki, Shiga =

Dissolved municipality in Shiga prefecture, Japan

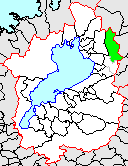
Location of Ibuki

Ibuki (伊吹町, Ibuki-chō) was a town located in Sakata District, Shiga Prefecture, Japan. Mount Ibuki dominates the town.

As of 2003, the town had an estimated population of 5,858 and a density of 53.66 persons per km^{2}. The total area was 109.17 km^{2}.

On February 14, 2005, Ibuki, along with the towns of Maihara and Santō (all from Sakata District), was merged to create the city of Maibara.
