= Ōmi, Shiga =

Dissolved municipality in Shiga prefecture, Japan

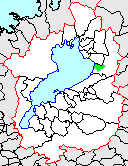
Location of Omi

Ōmi (近江町, Ōmi-chō) was a town located in Sakata District, Shiga Prefecture, Japan.

On October 1, 2005, Ōmi was merged into the expanded city of Maibara.

As of 2003, the town had an estimated population of 9,663 and a density of 535.64 persons per km^{2}. The total area was 18.04 km^{2}.
