= Samegai Station =

Railway station in Maibara, Shiga Prefecture, Japan

CA82 Samegai Station 醒ケ井駅
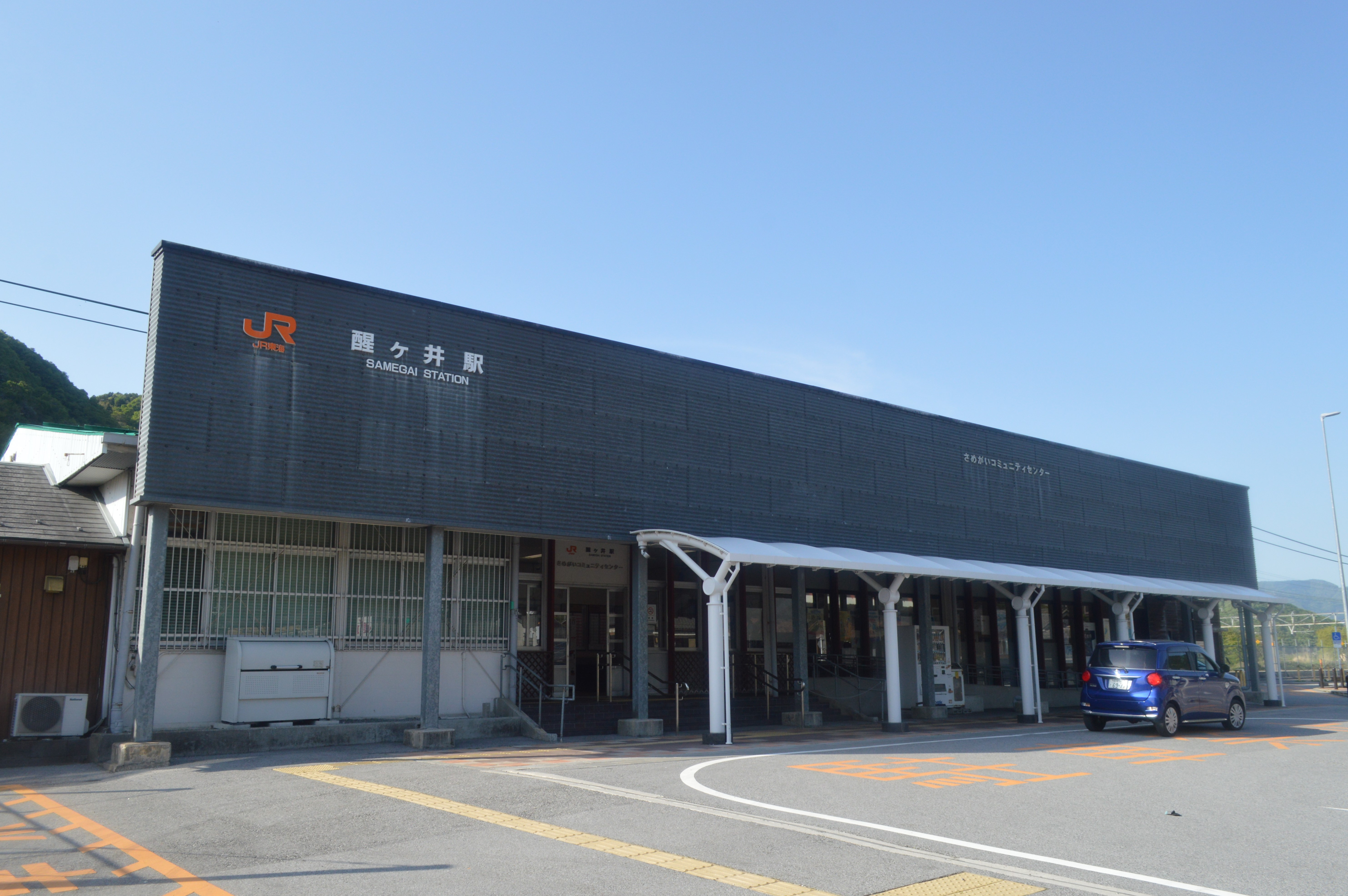
- Samegai Station in May 2023

General information
- Location: 619 Samegai, Maibara-shi, Shiga-ken 521-0035; Japan
- Coordinates: 35°19′40″N 136°20′43″E
- Operator: JR Central
- Line: Tōkaidō Main Line
- Distance: 439.8 km (273.3 miles) from Tokyo
- Platforms: 1 side + 1 island platform
- Tracks: 3

Other information
- Status: Staffed
- Website: Official website

History
- Opened: February 21, 1900

Passengers
- 2023–2024: 684 daily
Location
- Location within Shiga Prefecture Location within Japan

Samegai Station (醒ヶ井駅, Samegai-eki) is a passenger railway station located in the city of Maibara, Shiga Prefecture, Japan, operated by the Central Japan Railway Company (JR Tōkai).

== Lines ==
Samegai Station is served by the JR Central Tōkaidō Main Line, and is 439.8 kilometers from the terminus of the Tōkaidō line at Tokyo.

== Station layout ==
The station consists of one side platform and one island platform connected by a footbridge; however, only one side of the island platform is in use. The station is staffed.

=== Platforms ===
2	■ Tōkaidō Main Line	for Maibara, Kyoto
3	■ Tōkaidō Main Line	For Ōgaki, Nagoya

== Adjacent stations ==
«	Service	»
Tokaido Main Line
Limited Express "Hida": Does not stop at this station
Ōmi-Nagaoka	Special Rapid	Maibara
Ōmi-Nagaoka	New Rapid	Maibara
Ōmi-Nagaoka	Rapid	Maibara
Ōmi-Nagaoka	Sectional Rapid	Maibara
Ōmi-Nagaoka	Local	Maibara

== History ==
Samegai Station opened on 21 February 1900 on the Japanese Government Railway (JGR) Tōkaidō Line. The station came under the aegis of the Central Japan Railway Company on April 1, 1987 due to the privatization of JNR.

Station numbering was introduced to the section of the Tōkaidō Line operated by JR Central in March 2018; Samegai Station was assigned station number CA82.

== Passenger statistics ==
In fiscal 2019, the station was used by an average of 358 passengers daily (boarding passengers only).

== Surrounding area ==
- Maibara City Samegai Administrative Service Center
- Samegai-juku Museum

== See also ==
- List of railway stations in Japan
