= Sakata District, Shiga =

Former district in Shiga prefecture, Japan

Coordinates: 35°20′14″N 136°18′14″E

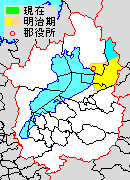
Map of Sakata District with Meiji period (1890) area in yellow.

Sakata (坂田郡, Sakata-gun) was a district located in Shiga Prefecture, Japan.

== Population ==
As of 2003, the district has an estimated population of 41,126 and a density of 184.34 persons per km^{2}. The total area is 223.10 km^{2}.

== History ==
By the time of founding, the district compromise the areas of the cities of Maibara, Hikone Toriimoto area, and the city Nagahama (former city). On April 1, 1943, the city of Nagahama (former city) was formed, and in 1952, the village of Toriimoto was merged into the city of Hikone. On February 14, 2005, the towns of Ibuki, Santō, and Maihara merged to form a new city called Maibara. Sakata District has been dissolved after Ōmi merged into Maibara on October 1, 2005.

== District timeline ==
- February 1, 1971 - The village of Ibuki was elevated to town status.
- February 14, 2005 - The towns of Maihara, Ibuki and Santō were merged to create the city of Maibara.
- October 1, 2005 - The town of Ōmi was merged into the expanded city of Maibara. Sakata District was dissolved as a result of this merger.
