= Kashiwabara-juku =

Pre-modern Japan post-station along highway

Kashiwabara-juku 柏原宿
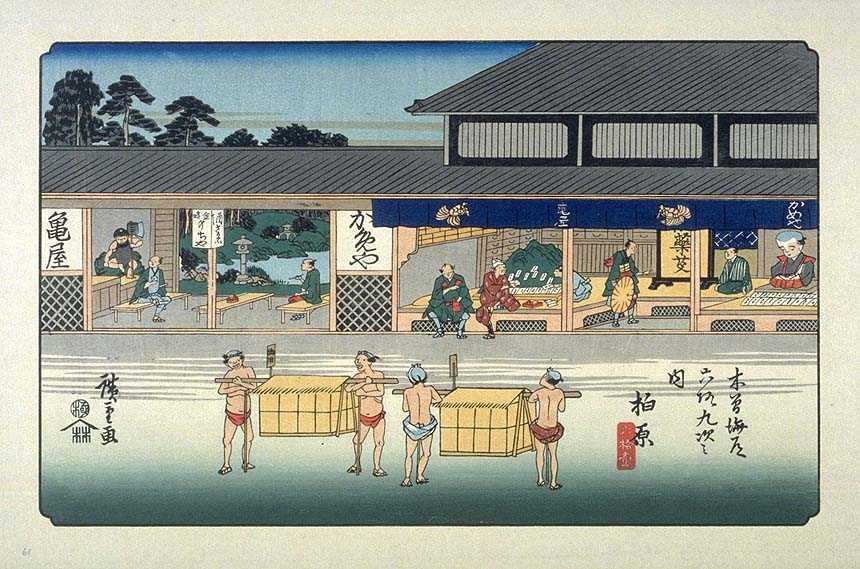
- Hiroshige's print of Kashiwabara-juku, part of the Sixty-nine Stations of the Kiso Kaidō series

General information
- Location: Maibara, Shiga (former Ōmi Province); Japan
- Coordinates: 35°20′34.9″N 136°24′01.5″E
- Elevation: 176 m (577 ft)
- System: post station
- Line: Nakasendō
- Distance: 450 km from Edo
Location
- Location within Shiga Prefecture Location within Japan

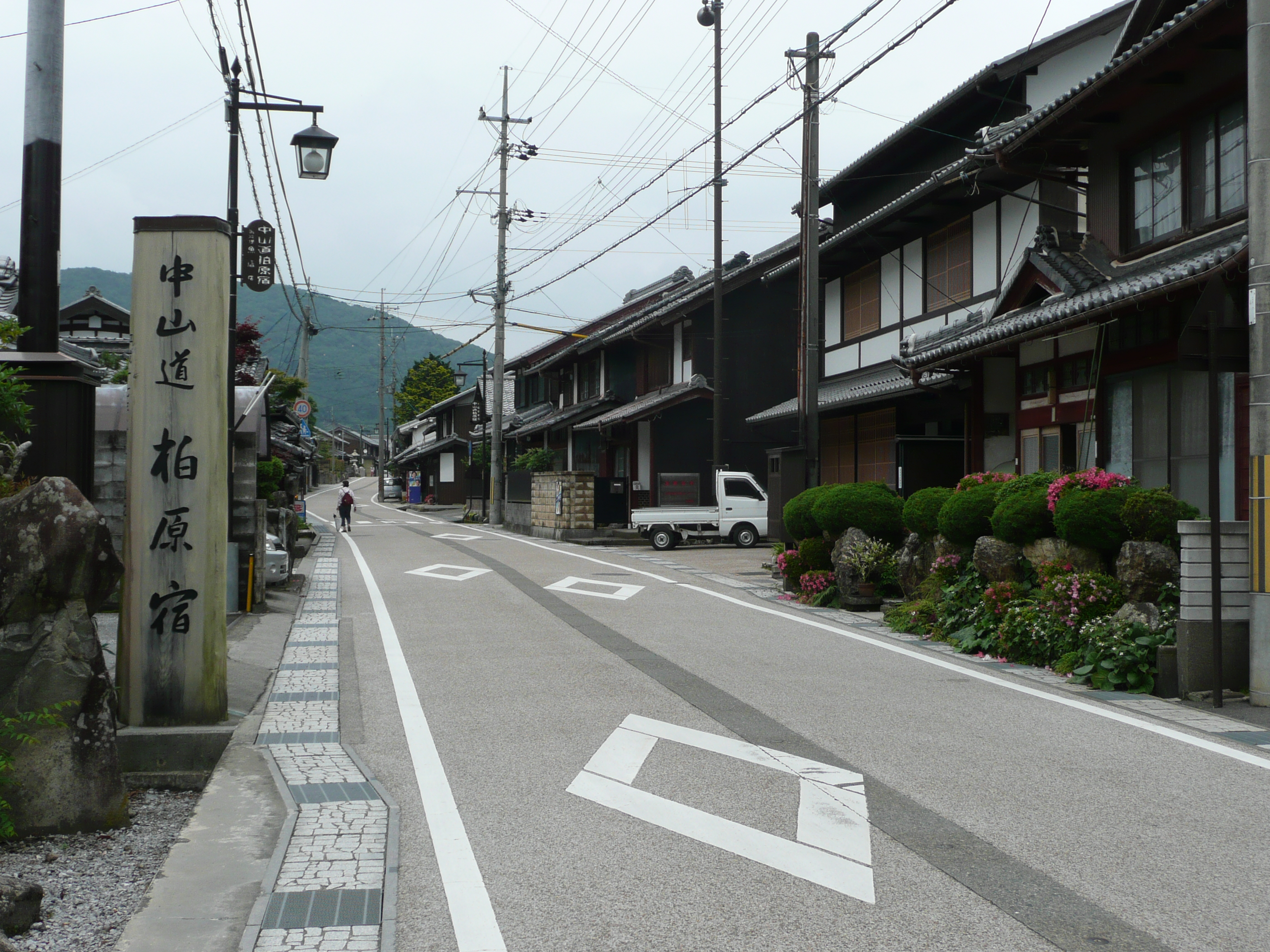
Kashiwabara-juku today

Kashiwabara-juku (柏原宿) was the sixtieth of the sixty-nine stations of the Nakasendō highway connecting Edo with Kyoto in Edo period Japan. It was located in the present-day city of Maibara, Shiga Prefecture, Japan.

== History ==
Kashiwabara-juku was located on the ancient Tōsandō highway connecting the capital of Heian-kyō with the provinces of eastern Japan, and near the border of Ōmi Province with Mino Province. A post station was first established in the Kashiwabara-juku area in 646. It is mentioned in then medieval chronicle Taiheiki

In the early Edo period, the system of post stations on the Nakasendō was formalized by the Tokugawa shogunate in 1602, and it was a stopping place for traveling merchants (Ōmi shōnin (近江商人)) who originated from Ōmi Province. It was also on the sankin-kōtai route used by various western daimyō to-and-from the Shogun's court in Edo. The area was known for its production of mugwort, which was used both as an ingredient in various dishes, but was also in great demand for medicinal purposes, particularly moxibustion. At one point, there were over ten shops that specialized in mugwort products, and this continues to be a local speciality into the modern period.

Per the 1843 "中山道宿村大概帳" (Nakasendō Shukuson Taigaichō) guidebook issued by the Inspector of Highways (道中奉行, Dōchu-būgyō), the town had a population of 1468 people in 344 houses, including one honjin, one waki-honjin, and 22 hatago. It also extended for approximately 1.5 km (0.9 mi) along the highway, making it one of the larger post stations along the Nakasendō. Kashiwabara-juku is 450 kilometers from Edo.

== Modern Kashiwabara-juku ==
In 1996, a study was conducted which showed that over one-fifth of the structures in the Kashiwabara-juku area were built in the either the Edo or Meiji periods. Some have been renovated, but many are in poor condition. The Kameya shop shown in the Hiroshige print still exists, but under the name of "Ibuki-do", which refers to the nearby Mount Ibuki, a source of mugwort. A very short distance from Kashiwabara-juku is the temple of Tokugen-in, which is the bodaiji of the Kyōgoku clan who ruled much of Ōmi Province in the Sengoku period. The clan's cemetery is a National Historic Site in 1936. The grave of late Kamakura period imperial loyalist Kitabatake Tomoyuki is likewise a National Historic Site and is on the mountain to the south of the temple. The Kashiwabara-juku History Museum is located in the middle of the post station and occupies the house of the Matsuura family, who made a fortune related to dyes.

== Kashiwabara-juku in The Sixty-nine Stations of the Kiso Kaidō ==
Utagawa Hiroshige's ukiyo-e print of Kashiwabara-juku dates from 1835 -1838. The print depicts the post station at dusk. Two kago (palanquin) with their bearers are in front of an open-fronted shop called "Kameya", which was famous for its medicinal herbs and mugwort products, however, signs indicate that it also served sake, rice cakes and other refreshments. A pair of travelers is depicted inside the shop itself, seated on the edge of the raised floor, while a shopkeeper introduces packets of herbal medicines. To the right, another traveler approaches the seated shop owner, who is seated next to a figure with an absurdly oversized head. This is a large paper-mâché statue of Fukusuke, a folk hero who brings good fortune to merchants. Similarly, on then left of the composition is a statue of Kintarō, another figure from Japanese folklore, who is somewhat pugnaciously overlooking two seated travelers in front of a Japanese garden.

== Gallery ==
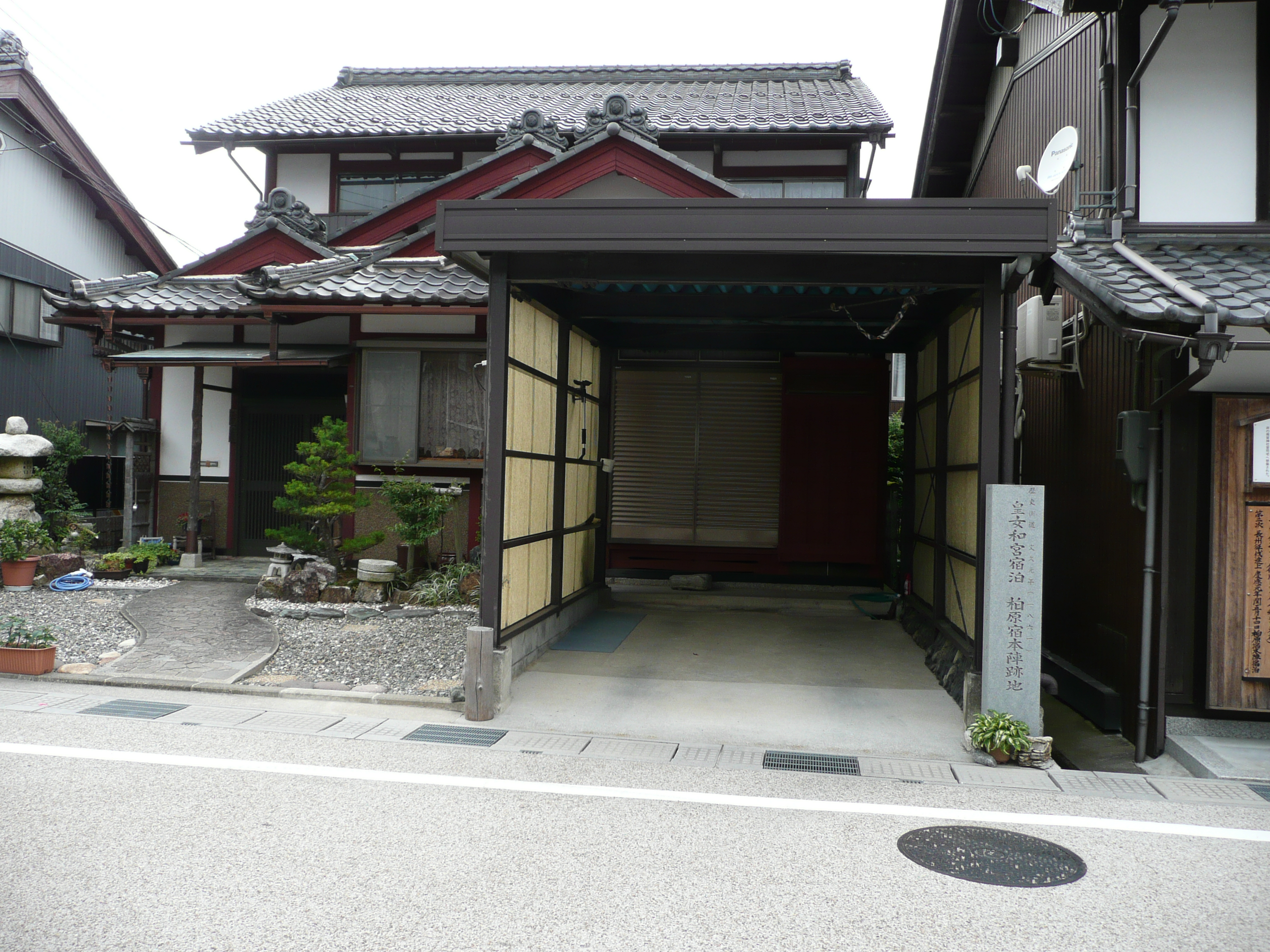
Site of the Honjin

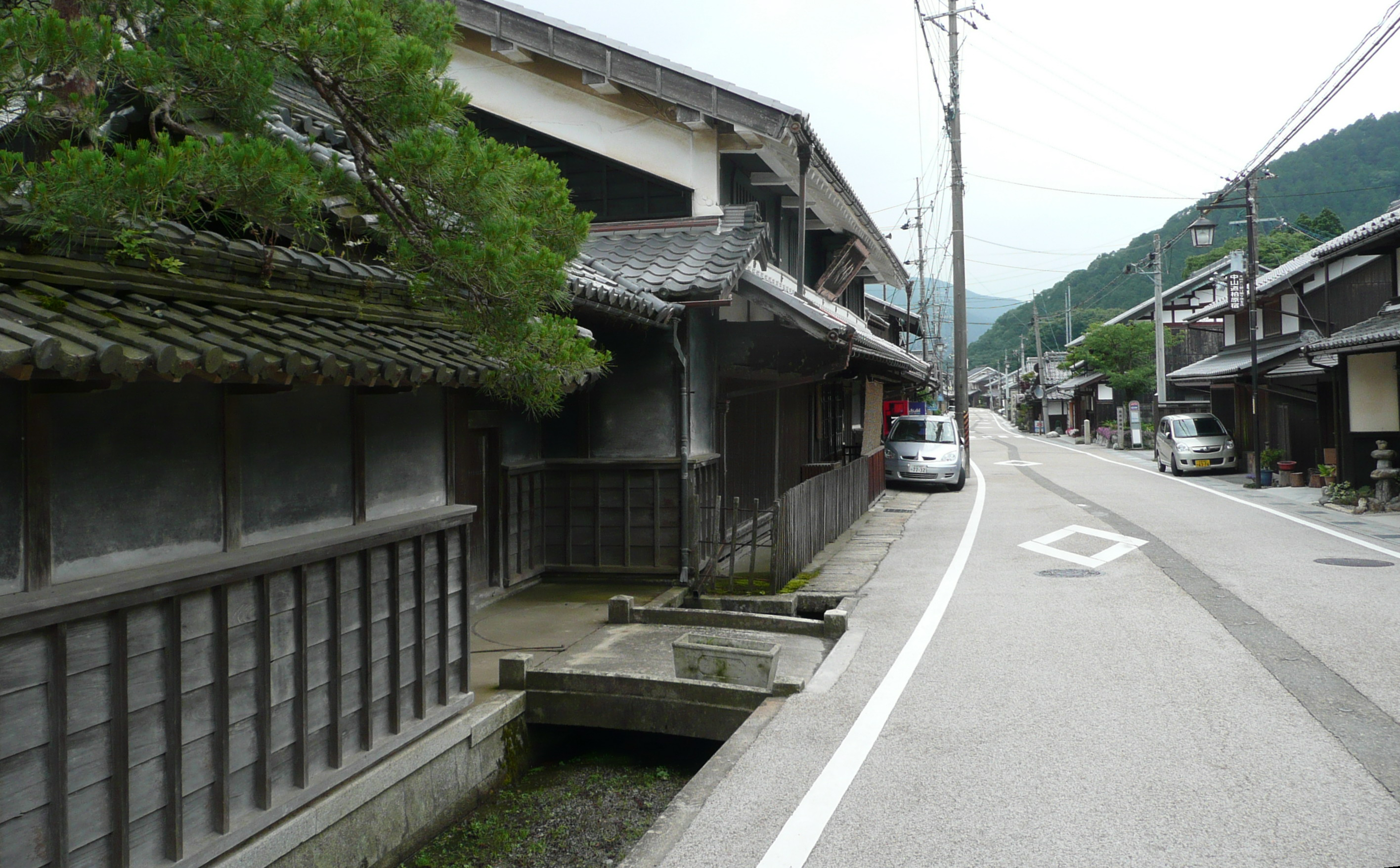
Panorama of the town

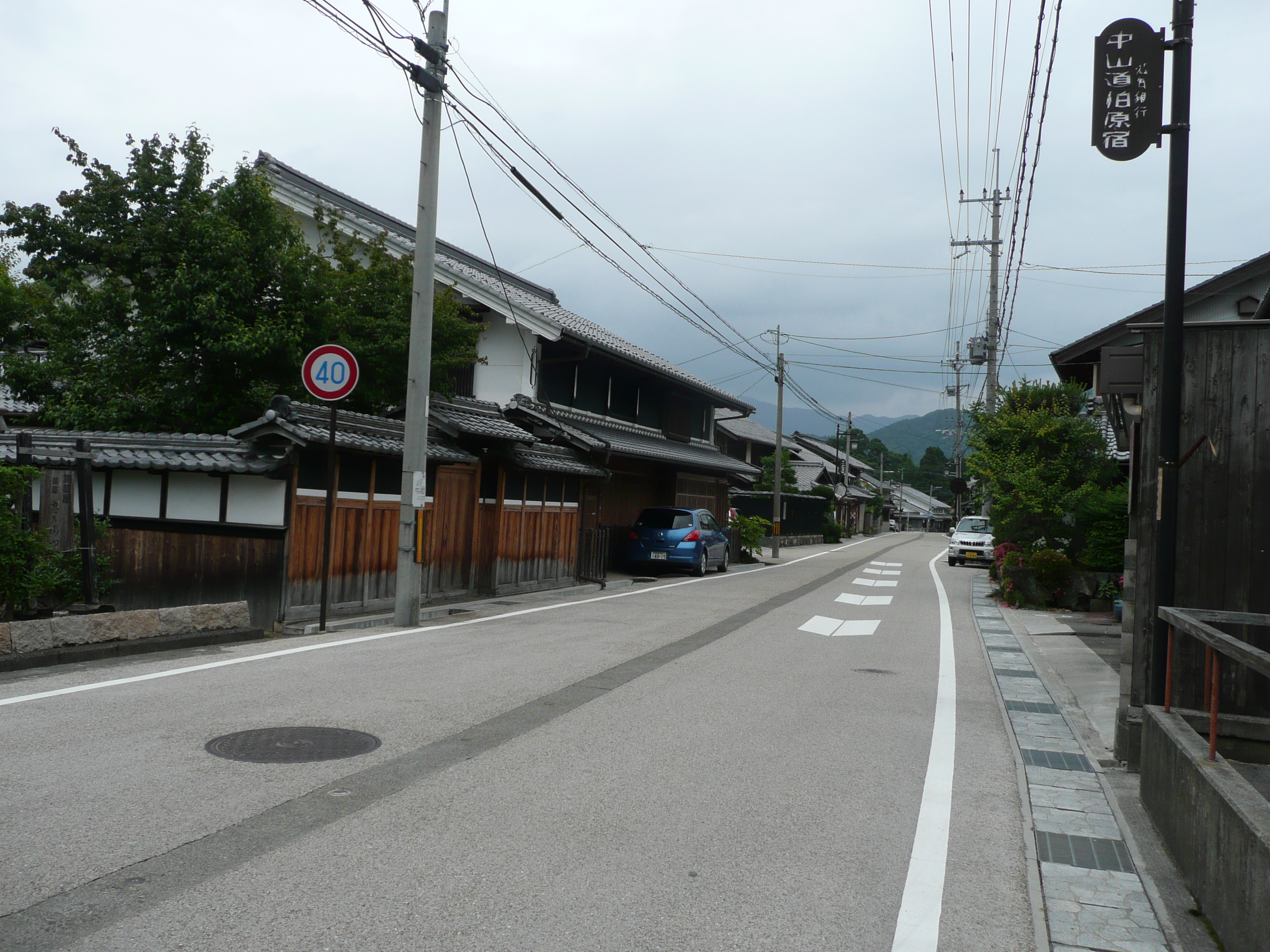
Panorama of the town

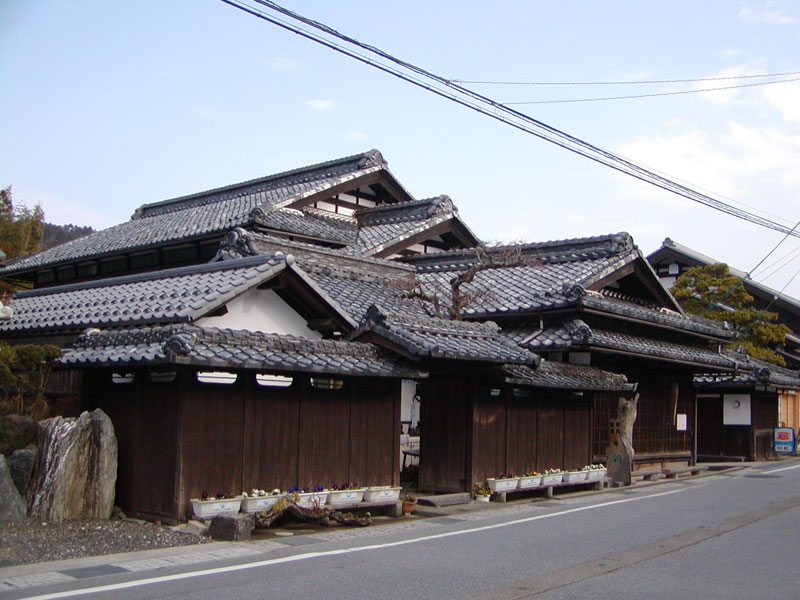
Kashiwabara-juku History Museum

== Neighboring Post Towns ==
Nakasendō
Imasu-juku - Kashiwabara-juku - Samegai-juku
