= Samegai-juku =

Pre-modern Japanese post station on the Nakasendō

Samegai-juku 醒井宿
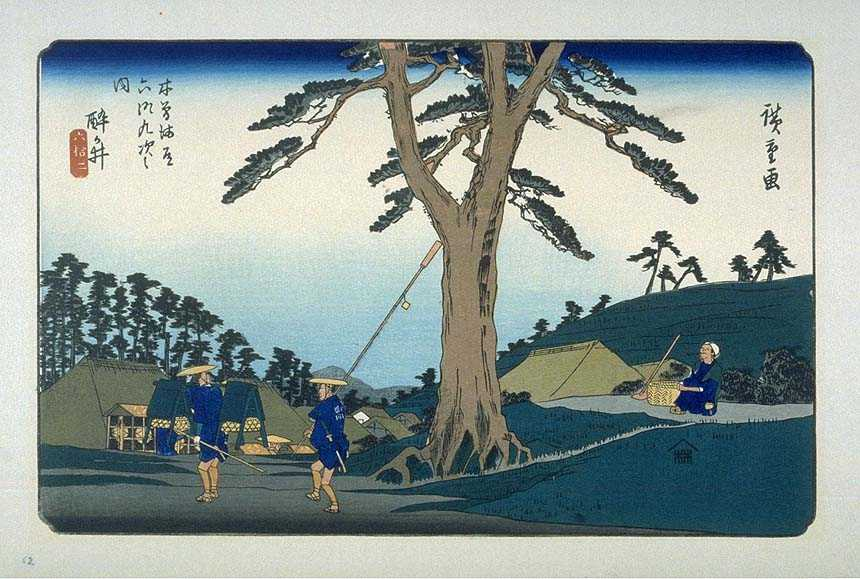
- Hiroshige's print of Samegai-juku, part of the Sixty-nine Stations of the Kiso Kaidō series

General information
- Location: Maibara, Shiga (former Ōmi Province); Japan
- Coordinates: 35°19′44.4″N 136°21′03.9″E
- Elevation: 120 m (390 ft)
- System: Post station
- Line: Nakasendō
- Distance: 457 km from Edo
Location
- Location within Shiga Prefecture Location within Japan

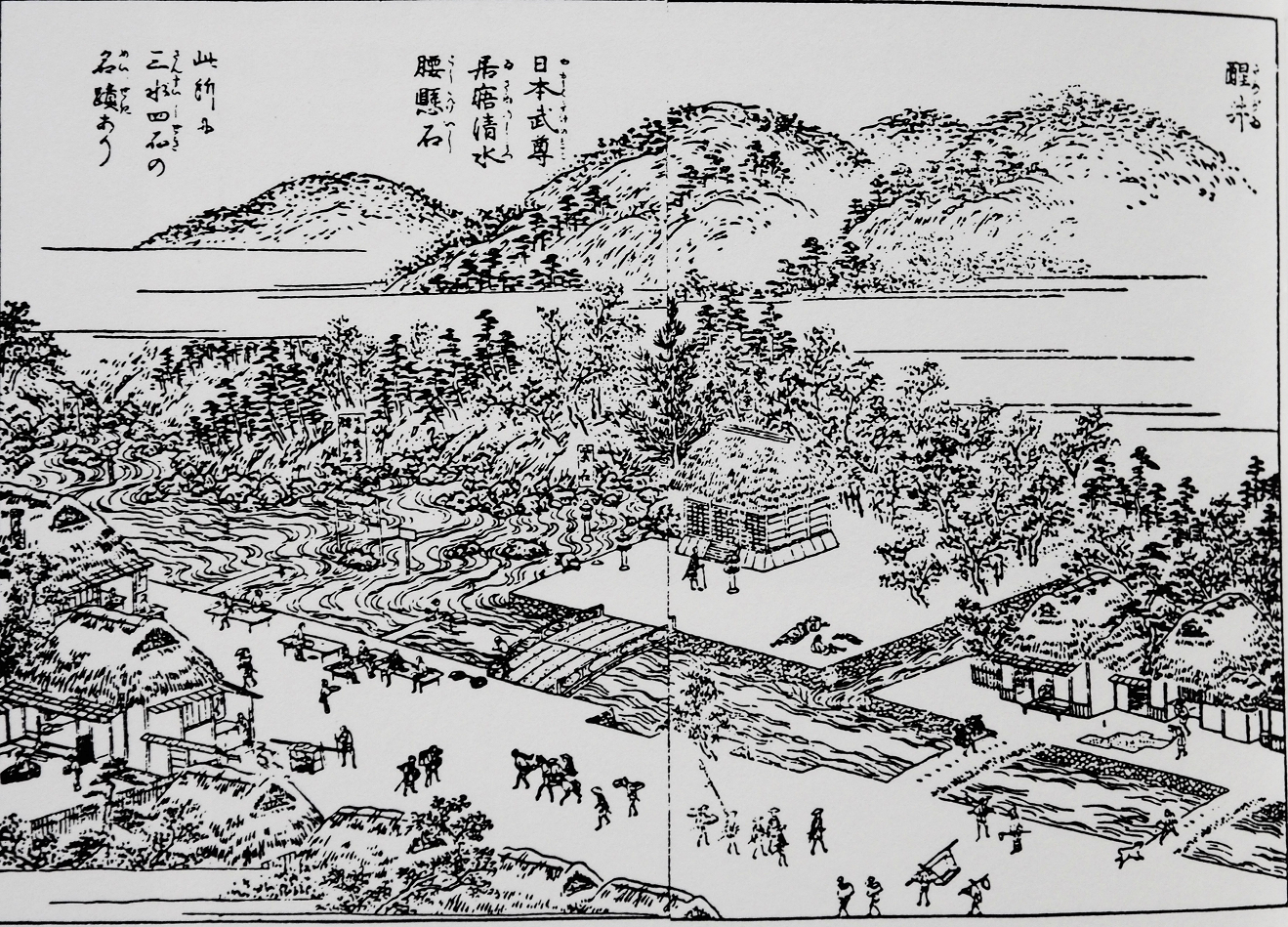
Samegai-juku in Maibara from Ōmi meisho zue (1797/1814)

Samegai-juku (醒井宿, Samegai-juku) was the sixty-first of the sixty-nine post stations on the Nakasendō, a highway connecting Edo (present-day Tokyo) and Kyoto during the Edo period of Japan. Located in what is now Maibara in Shiga Prefecture, the post town developed around the clear spring Isame no Shimizu and the Jizogawa River. Several Edo-period buildings and waterways survive, and the area forms part of the Japan Heritage listing “Lake Biwa and its Waterside Landscape—Water Heritage of Prayer and Life.”

== History ==
=== Early history ===
Samegai-juku has a long recorded history and is mentioned in both the Kojiki and the Nihon Shoki (720) in connection with the legend of Yamato Takeru. It stood along the ancient Tōsandō route linking the capital with the eastern provinces, and continued to appear in travel diaries and waka poetry through the Heian and Kamakura periods. Its abundant clear spring water—especially the source known as Isame no Shimizu (居醒の清水), which feeds the Jizogawa—made the settlement a favored resting place for travelers.

=== Edo period ===
In 1602, the Tokugawa shogunate formalized the post station system on the Nakasendō, designating Samegai-juku as an official station. It became a stopping place for traveling merchants (Ōmi shōnin (近江商人)) from Ōmi Province and for western daimyō processions on the sankin-kōtai route to and from the shogun’s court in Edo. The Jizogawa was navigable by small boats and barges for local transport of goods, and Samegai-juku had seven ton’ya-ba (warehouses) along its banks—an unusually high number for a post town.

According to the 1843 "中山道宿村大概帳" (Nakasendō Shukuson Taigaichō) guidebook compiled by the Inspector of Highways (道中奉行, Dōchū-bugyō), the settlement had a population of 539 in 138 houses, including one honjin, one waki-honjin, and eleven hatago. The historic townscape developed along the Jizogawa with three main quarters: Shinmachi (east), Nakamachi (center, site of the honjin and waki-honjin), and Kozamegai (west). The western edge, known as Rokken jaya (“six teahouses”), served retainers traveling with daimyō processions.

The prosperity of Samegai-juku declined after the Meiji Restoration (1868), when the Nakasendō lost importance with the advent of modern rail transport.

== Modern Samegai-juku ==
=== Preservation and heritage ===
Ten buildings from the Edo period survive today, giving visitors a sense of the post town’s original streetscape. The Samegai-juku Archives Museum occupies the former Samegai Post Office, a Meiji/Taishō-era pseudo-Western building that displays artifacts related to the town’s history. Together with neighboring Kashiwabara-juku and Banba-juku, Samegai preserves one of the most continuous Edo-period streetscapes along the Nakasendō.

In 2015, the area was designated a component of the Japan Heritage program under the title “Lake Biwa and its Waterside Landscape—Water Heritage of Prayer and Life.”(in Japanese)

=== Natural environment ===
The spring-fed Jizogawa still flows through the town, maintaining a constant temperature of about 14 °C year-round. Its clear water has long supported everyday life through small washing places and fish pens, and the water channels (kawabata) remain a distinctive feature of the townscape. Aquatic plants such as baikamo (Ranunculus nipponicus) bloom in season.

== Samegai-juku in The Sixty-nine Stations of the Kiso Kaidō ==
Utagawa Hiroshige’s ukiyo-e print of Samegai-juku, produced between 1835 and 1838, centers on a large pine tree with the thatched roofs of the Rokken jaya in the background. Two samurai retainers, one bearing a spear, approach the buildings, while others carry loads up the slope behind them. A seated farmer smokes a pipe as the Hira Mountains rise in the distance, beyond which lies Lake Biwa.

== Gallery ==
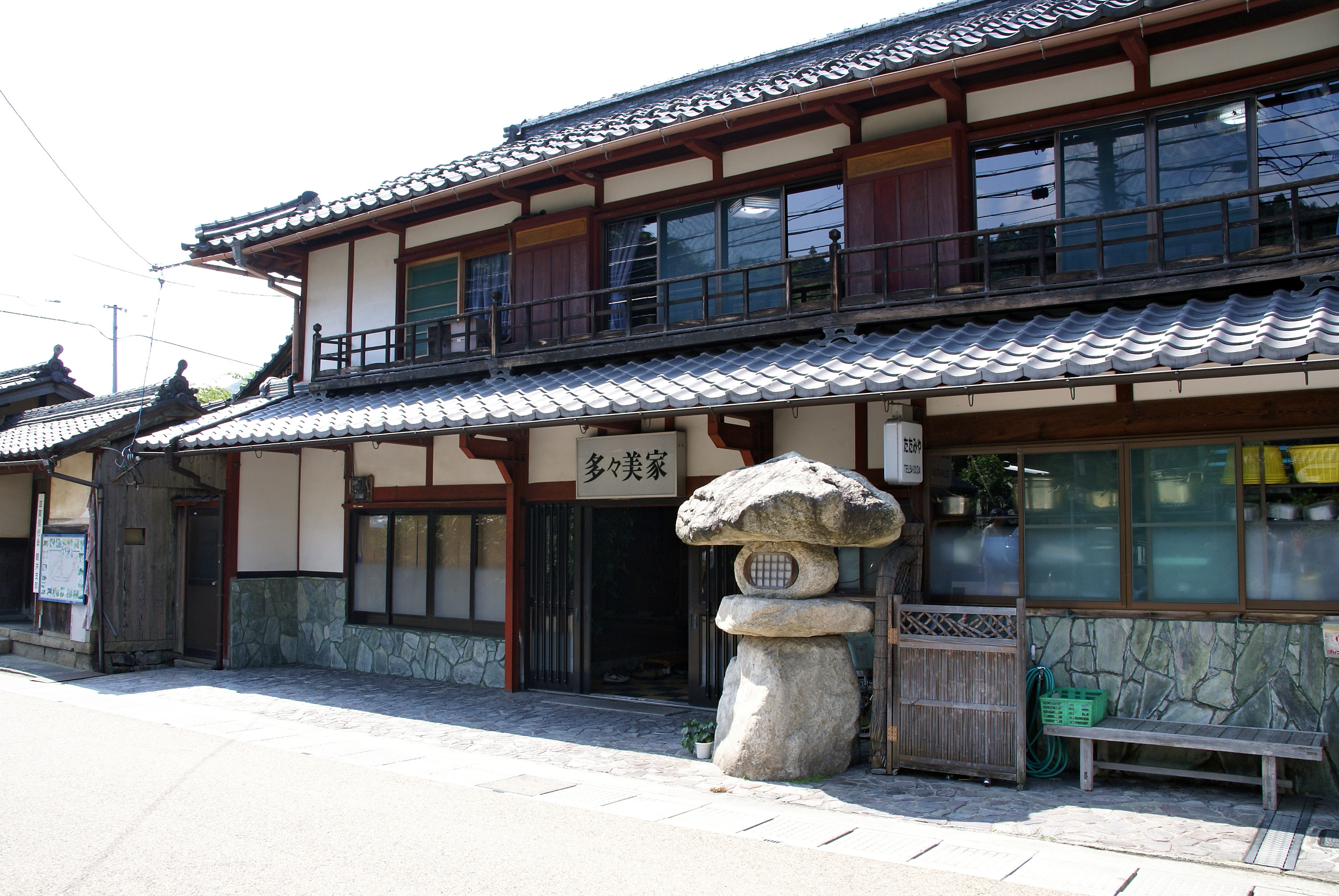
Edo-period building in Samegai-juku

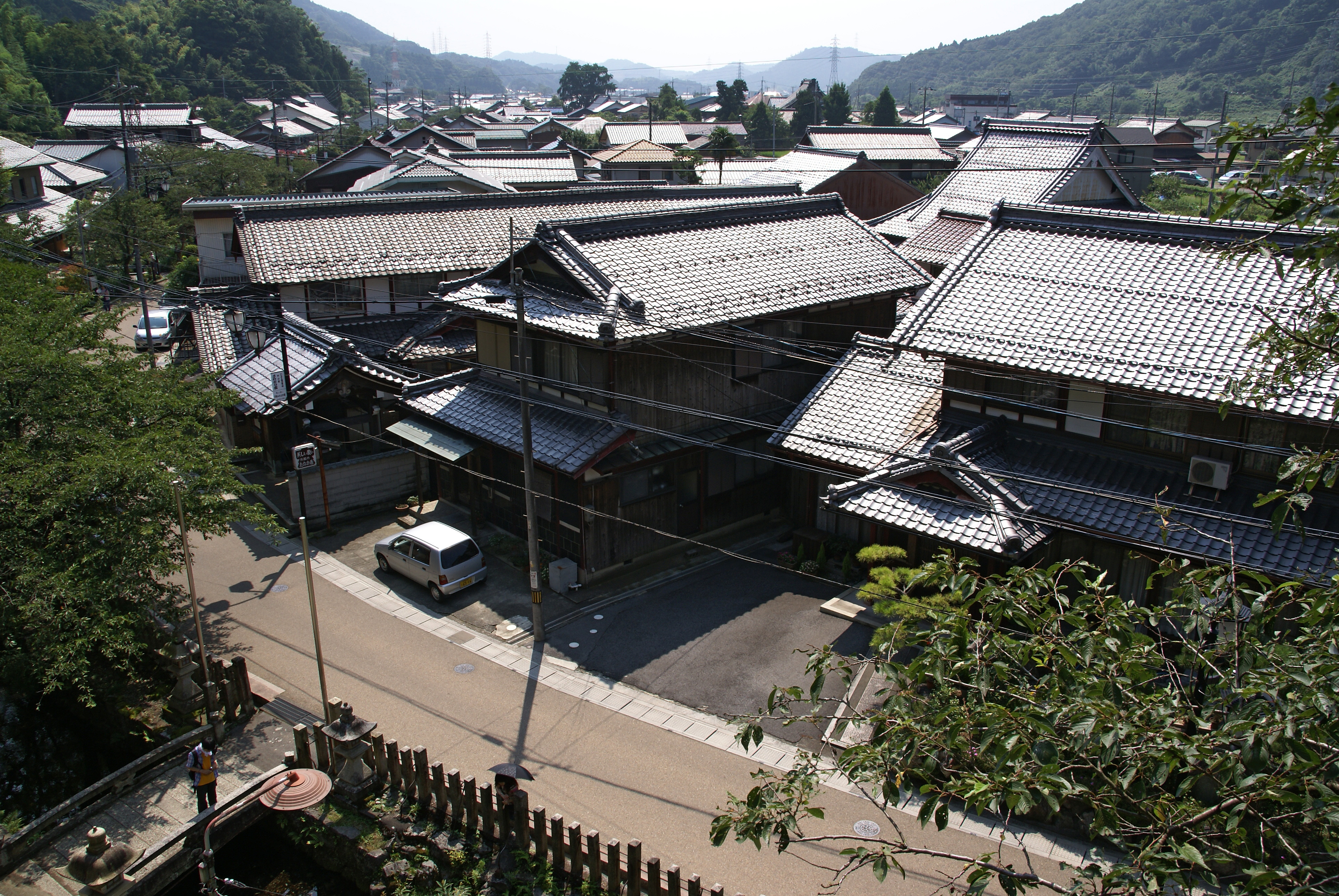
Panoramic view of Samegai-juku along the Jizogawa

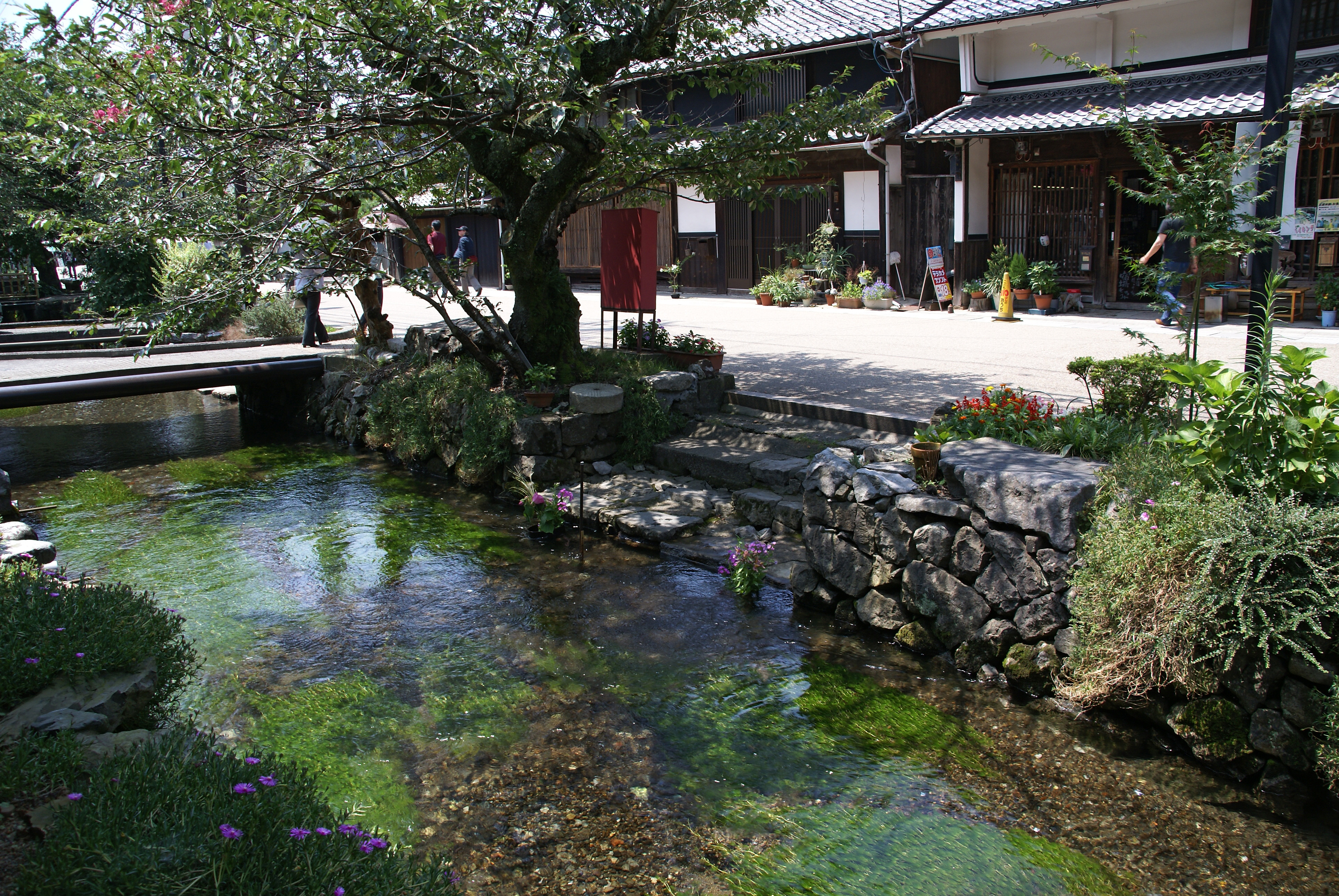
Jizogawa River (spring-fed channel)

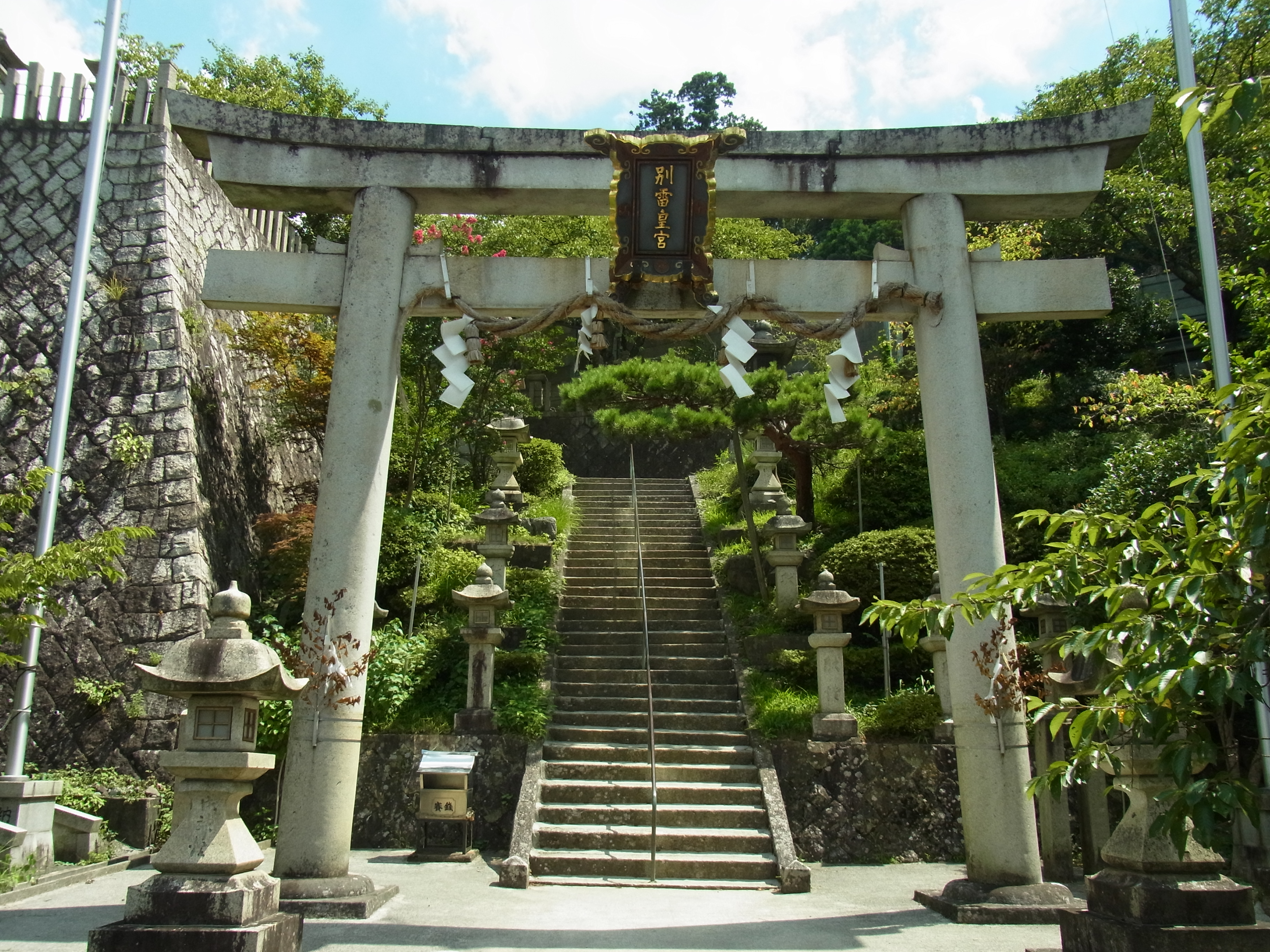
Kamo-jinja, guardian shrine of the post town

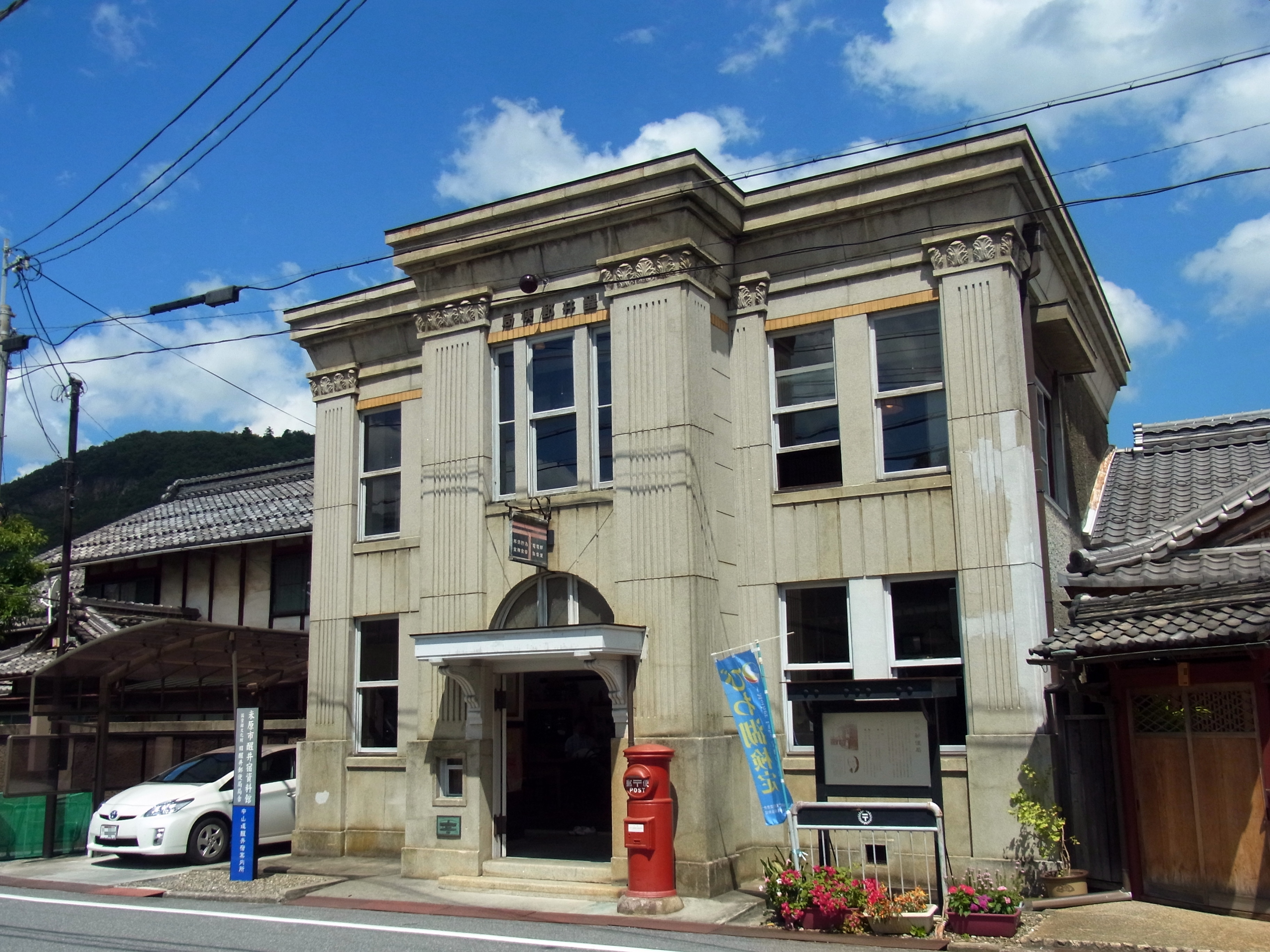
Former Samegai Post Office (now the Samegai-juku Archives Museum)

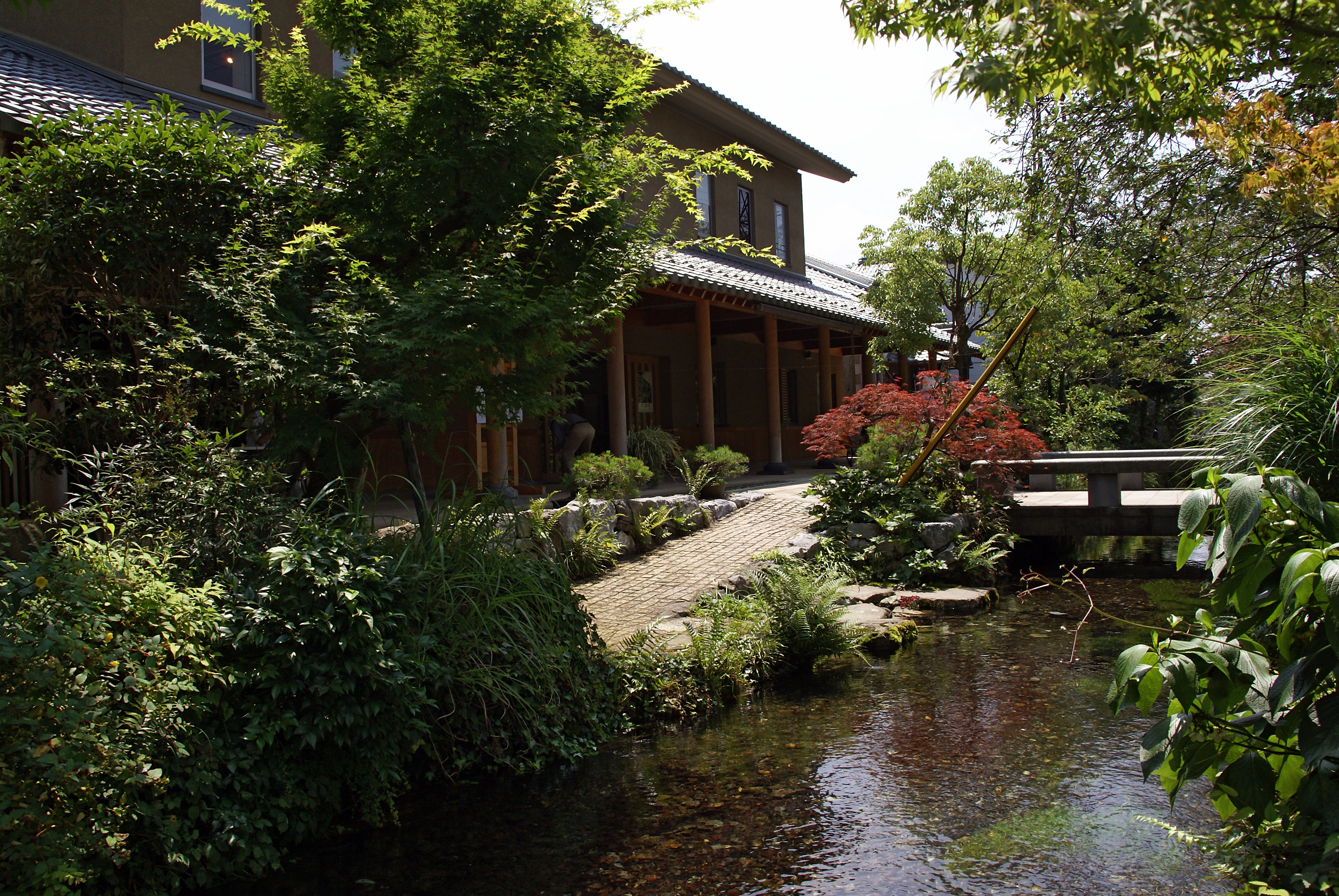
Samegai Woodcarving Museum

== Neighboring post towns ==
Nakasendō
| Previous post town | Current | Next post town |
|---|---|---|
| Kashiwabara-juku; 5.9 km away | Samegai-juku | Banba-juku; 3.9 km away |

(in Japanese)
