= Banba-juku =

Pre-modern Japan post-station along highway

Banba-juku 番場宿
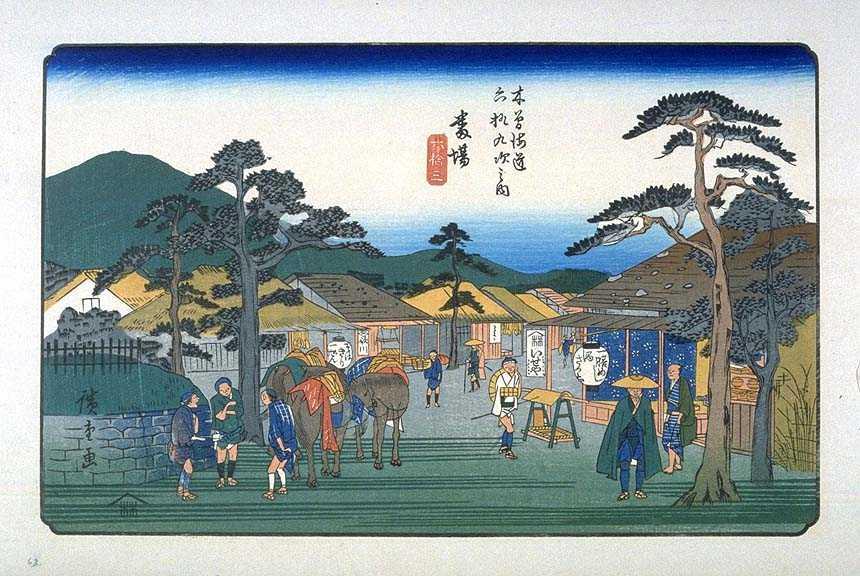
- Hiroshige's print of Banba-juku, part of the Sixty-nine Stations of the Kiso Kaidō series

General information
- Location: Maibara, Shiga (former Ōmi Province); Japan
- Coordinates: 35°18′29″N 136°18′39″E
- Elevation: 134 m (440 ft)
- System: post station
- Line: Nakasendō
- Distance: 468 km from Edo
Location
- Location within Shiga Prefecture Location within Japan

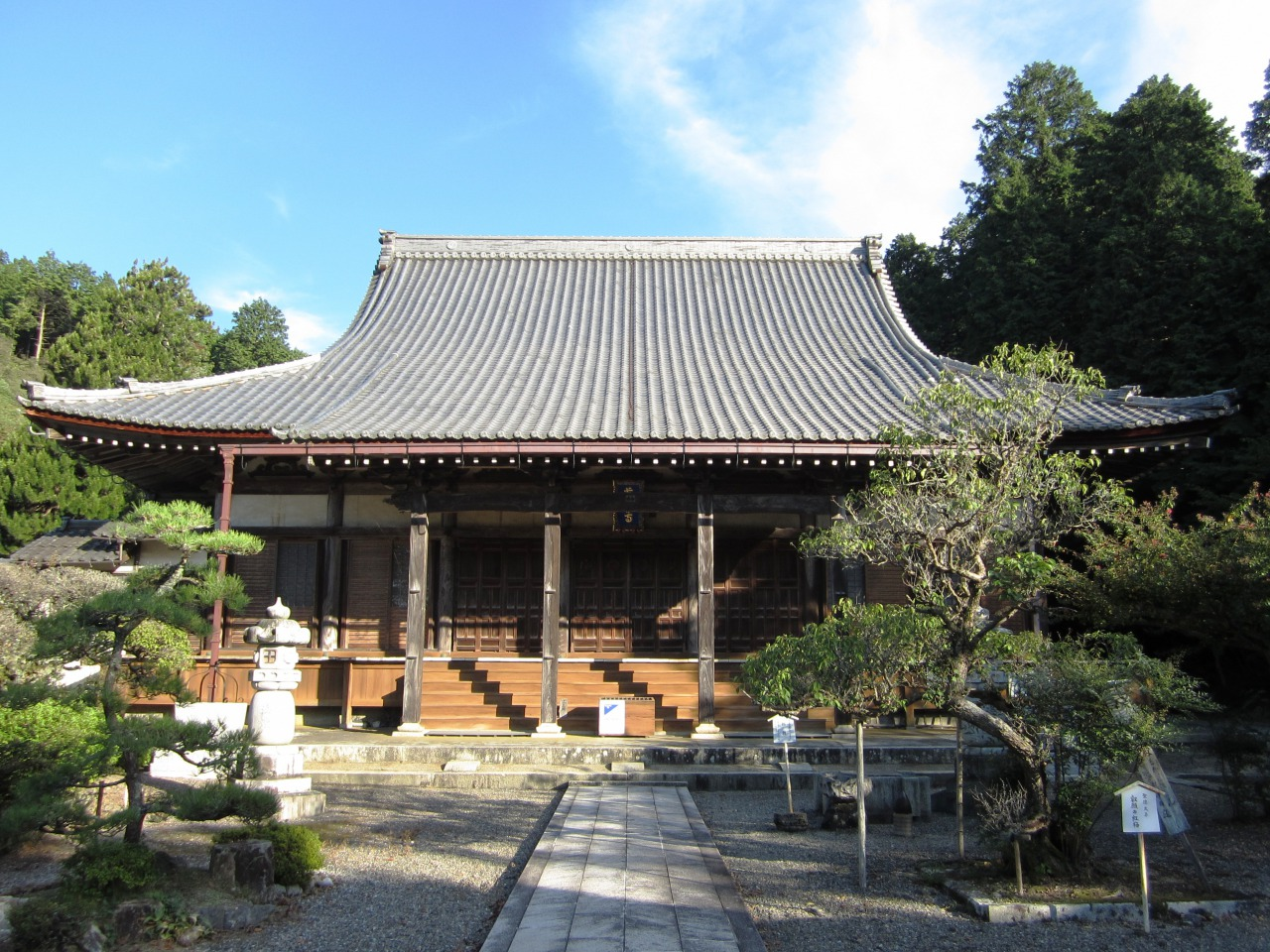
Main Hall of Renge-ji in Banba-juku

Banba-juku (番場宿, Banba-juku) was the sixty-second of the sixty-nine stations of the Nakasendō highway connecting Edo with Kyoto in Edo period Japan. It was located in the present-day city of Maibara, Shiga Prefecture, Japan.

== History ==
Banba-juku has a very long history, and was located on the ancient Tōsandō highway connecting the capital of Heian-kyō with the provinces of eastern Japan from the Asuka period. The road runs parallel to Lake Biwa between Banba and neighboring Toriimoto-juku, but Banba-juku is in a valley separated from the lake by a range of low hills. During the Kamakura period, Kujō Yoritsune is recorded as having stayed in Banba-jku in 1246. According to the medieval Taiheiki chronicle, during the 1333 Kenmu Restoration, the final Rokuhara Tandai, Hōjō Nakatoki committed seppuku together with 430 of his family and retainers at the temple of Renge-ji in Banba-juku after their defeat at the hands of Sasaki Takauji, who was acting under the authority of Emperor Go-Daigo to assist the Ashikaga clan in overthrowing the Kamakura shogunate.

In the early Edo period, the system of post stations on the Nakasendō was formalized by the Tokugawa shogunate in 1602, and it was a stopping place for traveling merchants (Ōmi shōnin (近江商人)) who originated from Ōmi Province. It was also on the sankin-kōtai route by many western daimyō to-and-from the Shogun's court in Edo. In 1611 a cutting through the hills to Maibara port on Lake Biwa made travel by boat to Ōtsu-juku possible. This cut travel time by two days, but was expensive and only the wealthier travelers could afford it. Banba-juku served as a warehousing and transshipment point for goods brought by water to Maibara. Per the 1843 "中山道宿村大概帳" (Nakasendō Shukuson Taigaichō) guidebook issued by the Inspector of Highways (道中奉行, Dōchu-būgyō), the town had a population of 808 people in 178 houses, including one honjin, one waki-honjin, and 10 hatago, and was thus one of the smallest of the stations in Ōmi Province. Banba-juku is 468 kilometers from Edo and 64 kilometers from Kyoto.

== Banba-juku in The Sixty-nine Stations of the Kiso Kaidō ==
Utagawa Hiroshige's ukiyo-e print of Banba-juku dates from 1835-1838. The print depicts the post station at dawn. On the left is a mound, possibly an ichirizuka, in front of which three men with packhorses are discussing the day's business. On the opposite side of the road a man observes a traveller dressed with a stray hat and a green cloak depart. A kago (palanquin) is parked in front of the building, which is presumably a hatago or restaurant. All of the buildings are single-story, but some have roofs with wooden shingles held in place with stones, whereas others have thatched roofs. The names of "Hiroshige", "Utagawa" and that of his publisher "Kinjudo" and "Iseya" are disguised in various signposts and hanging lanterns.

== Neighboring post towns ==
Nakasendō
Samegai-juku - Banba-juku - Toriimoto-juku
