= Mount Ibuki =

Mountain in Japan on the border between Maibara and Ibigawa

- 伊吹山
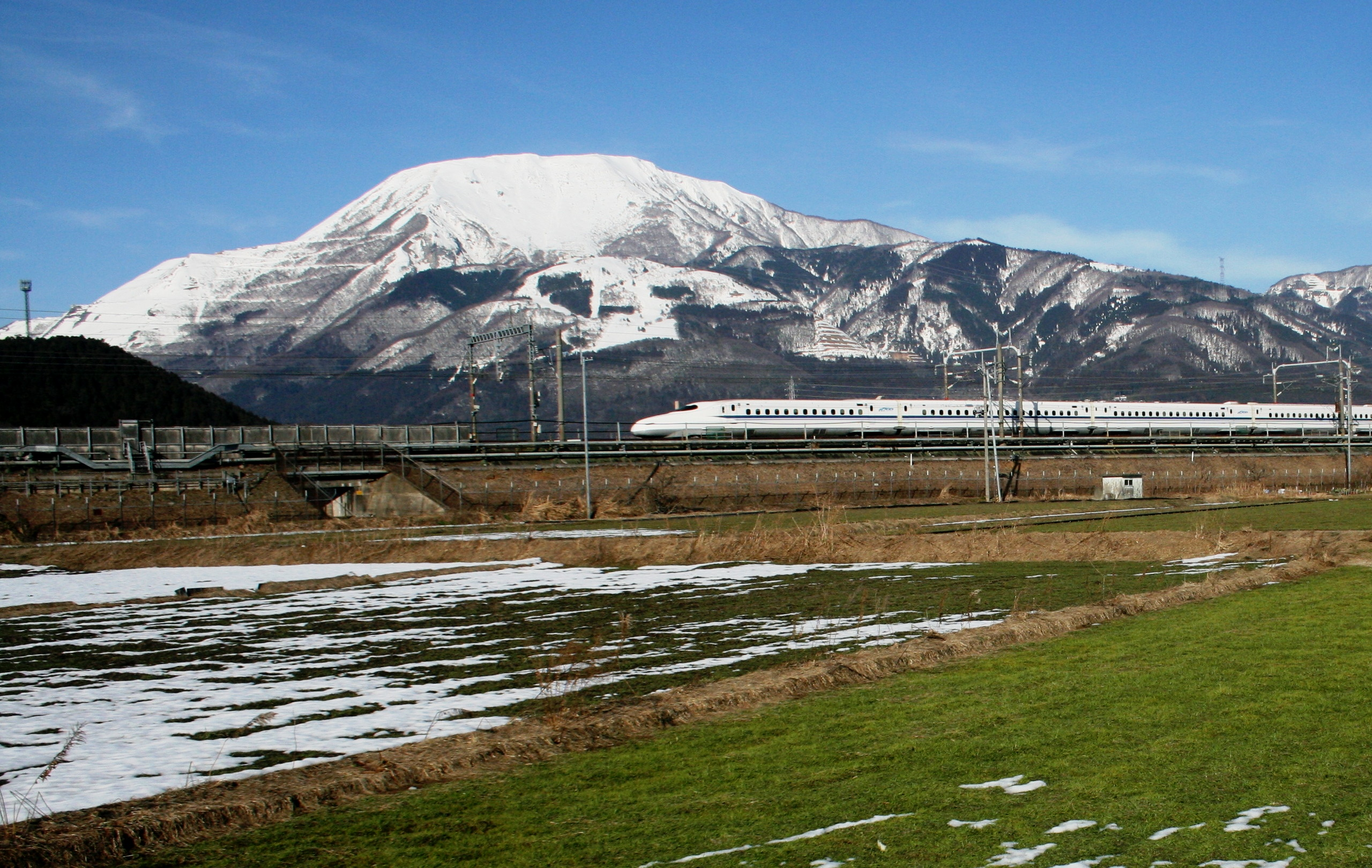
- Mount Ibuki and N700 Series Shinkansen

Highest point
- Elevation: 1,377 m (4,518 ft)
- Listing: 100 Famous Japanese Mountains
- Coordinates: 35°25′04″N 136°24′22″E

Naming
- Language of name: Japanese

Geography
- Location within Japan
- Location: Ibigawa, Gifu Prefecture; Maibara, Shiga Prefecture; Japan

Geology
- Mountain type: Upheaved submarine volcano

Mount Ibuki (伊吹山, Ibuki-yama) is a 1,377-metre-high (4,518 ft) mountain, on the border of Maibara, Shiga Prefecture, and Ibigawa, Gifu Prefecture, Japan. It is one of the 100 Famous Japanese Mountains, and is also included on the lists of the 100 Kinki Mountains and the 50 Shiga Mountains. Mount Ibuki is the highest mountain in Shiga Prefecture.

== Outline ==
Mount Ibuki is the highest peak in the Ibuki Mountains, which stretch from north to south along the border of Shiga Prefecture and Gifu Prefecture. Located at the southern end of the mountain chain with the Suzuka Mountains not too far to the south, a small plain at the foot of this mountain, Sekigahara, became one of the most important strategic points throughout Japanese history.

== Nature ==
Since ancient times, Mount Ibuki has also been known for its rich variety of wild plants and animals, as well as for its beautiful shape.

== Climate ==
Mount Ibuki has a humid continental climate (Köppen climate classification Dfb) with mild summers and cold winters. On 14 February 1927, 230 centimetres (90.6 in) of snow fell on Mount Ibuki, which is the highest 24 hour totals in the world on record.

Climate data for Mount Ibuki (1961−1990 normals, extremes 1919−2001)
Month	Jan	Feb	Mar	Apr	May	Jun	Jul	Aug	Sep	Oct	Nov	Dec	Year
Record high °C (°F)	9.9 (49.8)	10.8 (51.4)	14.6 (58.3)	22.1 (71.8)	23.5 (74.3)	25.4 (77.7)	27.6 (81.7)	29.2 (84.6)	28.8 (83.8)	21.4 (70.5)	18.3 (64.9)	13.8 (56.8)	29.2 (84.6)
Mean daily maximum °C (°F)	−3.4 (25.9)	−2.9 (26.8)	0.6 (33.1)	8.3 (46.9)	13.2 (55.8)	16.2 (61.2)	19.8 (67.6)	20.9 (69.6)	17.1 (62.8)	11.9 (53.4)	6.2 (43.2)	−0.3 (31.5)	9.0 (48.2)
Daily mean °C (°F)	−5.7 (21.7)	−5.4 (22.3)	−2.4 (27.7)	4.6 (40.3)	9.5 (49.1)	13.3 (55.9)	17.2 (63.0)	18.0 (64.4)	14.3 (57.7)	8.5 (47.3)	3.1 (37.6)	−2.6 (27.3)	6.0 (42.9)
Mean daily minimum °C (°F)	−8.0 (17.6)	−7.9 (17.8)	−5.3 (22.5)	1.3 (34.3)	6.2 (43.2)	10.8 (51.4)	15.0 (59.0)	15.9 (60.6)	12.1 (53.8)	5.9 (42.6)	0.4 (32.7)	−4.9 (23.2)	3.5 (38.2)
Record low °C (°F)	−16.3 (2.7)	−16.5 (2.3)	−15.9 (3.4)	−10.0 (14.0)	−5.6 (21.9)	0.3 (32.5)	6.5 (43.7)	7.6 (45.7)	3.2 (37.8)	−3.6 (25.5)	−9.9 (14.2)	−14.7 (5.5)	−16.5 (2.3)
Average precipitation mm (inches)	—	—	—	141.1 (5.56)	169.2 (6.66)	292.1 (11.50)	331.2 (13.04)	212.9 (8.38)	246.8 (9.72)	138.6 (5.46)	86.0 (3.39)	—	—
Average snowfall cm (inches)	431 (170)	493 (194)	469 (185)	338 (133)	62 (24)	0 (0)	0 (0)	0 (0)	0 (0)	trace	21 (8.3)	132 (52)	1,946 (766.3)
Average relative humidity (%)	90	88	84	80	80	89	94	93	91	83	85	89	87
Mean monthly sunshine hours	66.3	77.3	129.4	146.6	172.5	112.3	99.7	121.6	98.3	136.2	106.5	78.1	1,344.8
Source 1: NOAA (1961-1990)
Source 2: JMA

== Route ==
There are two ways to ascend Mount Ibuki. The easiest way is to use the Ibuki Driveway. The summit is a 10-minute walk from the parking lot. There is also a bus going from Sekigahara Station up to the parking lot in the summer months. The alternative method is to simply climb the mountain from its base. Many climbers climb from the Ibuki-Tozanguchi bus stop, which is 10 minutes by bus from Omi-Nagaoka Station on the Tōkaidō Main Line. Until 2011 there was a gondola going to the ski resort Sangome about halfway on the mountain slope. Both have been shut down since then and all the lifts have been removed.

== Access ==
- Ibuki-Tozanguchi Bus Stop of Kokoku Bus from Ōmi-Nagaoka Station or Nagahama Station

== Geology ==
Mount Ibuki was once a submarine volcano.

== Gallery ==
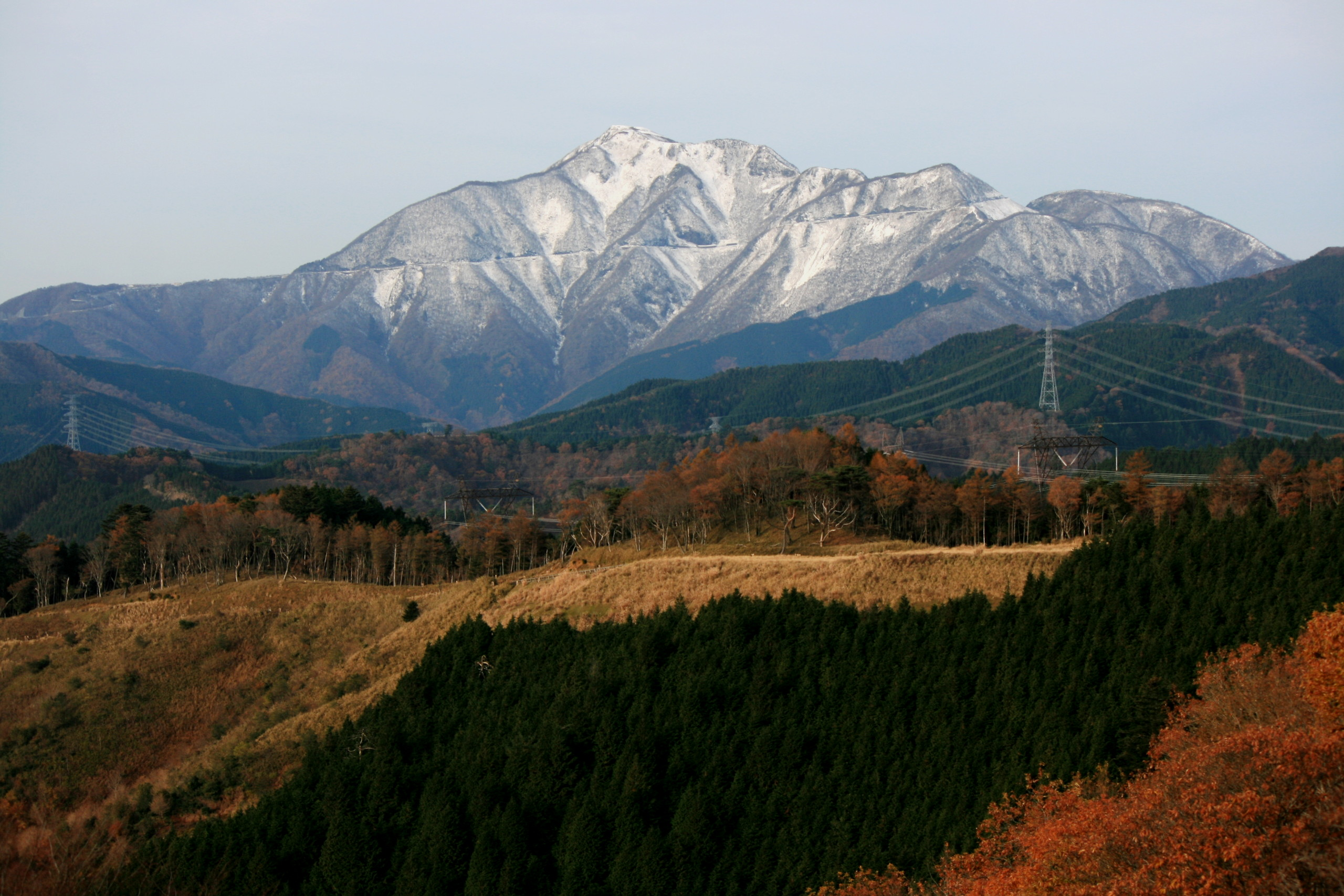
From Mount Ikeda

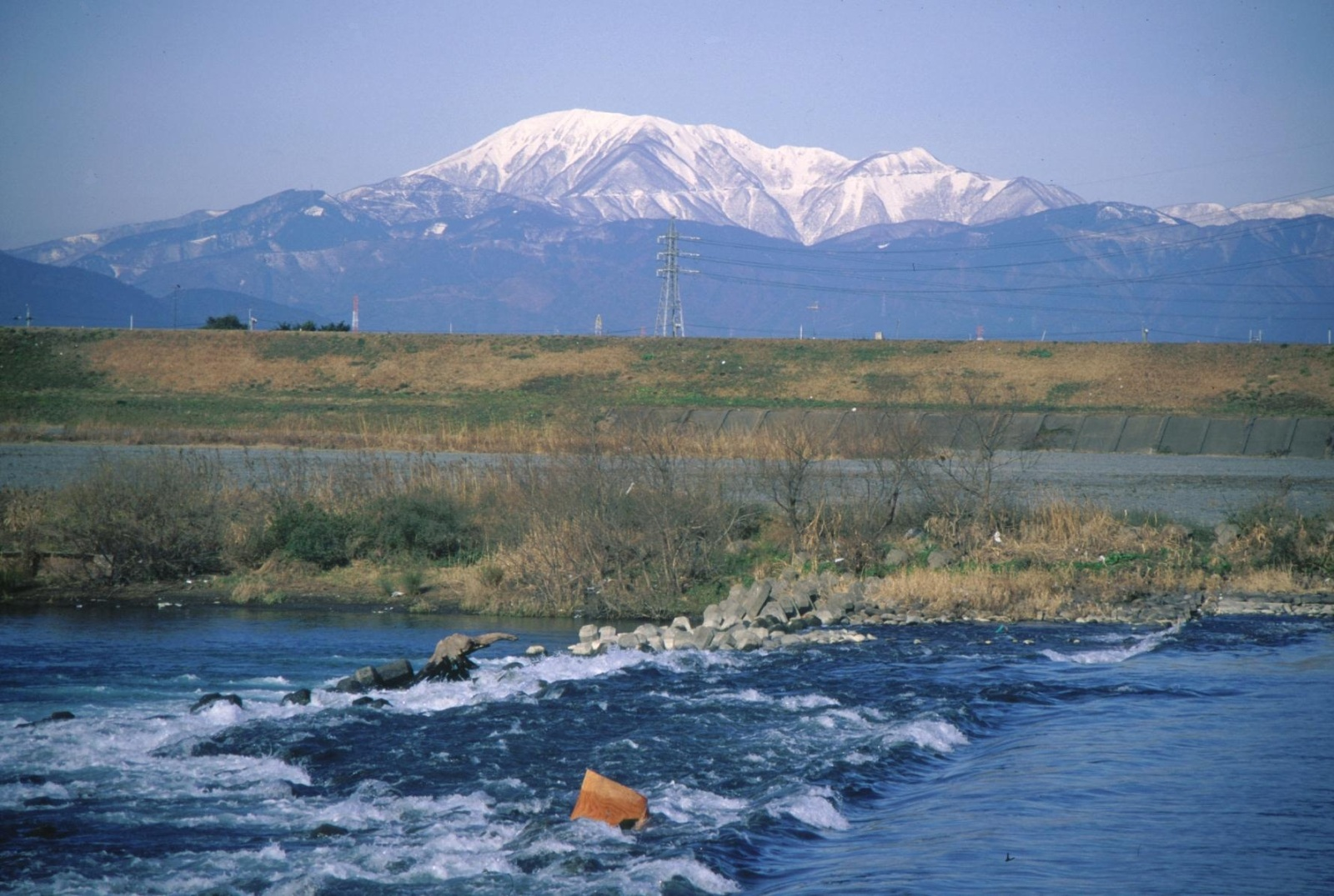
From Ibi River

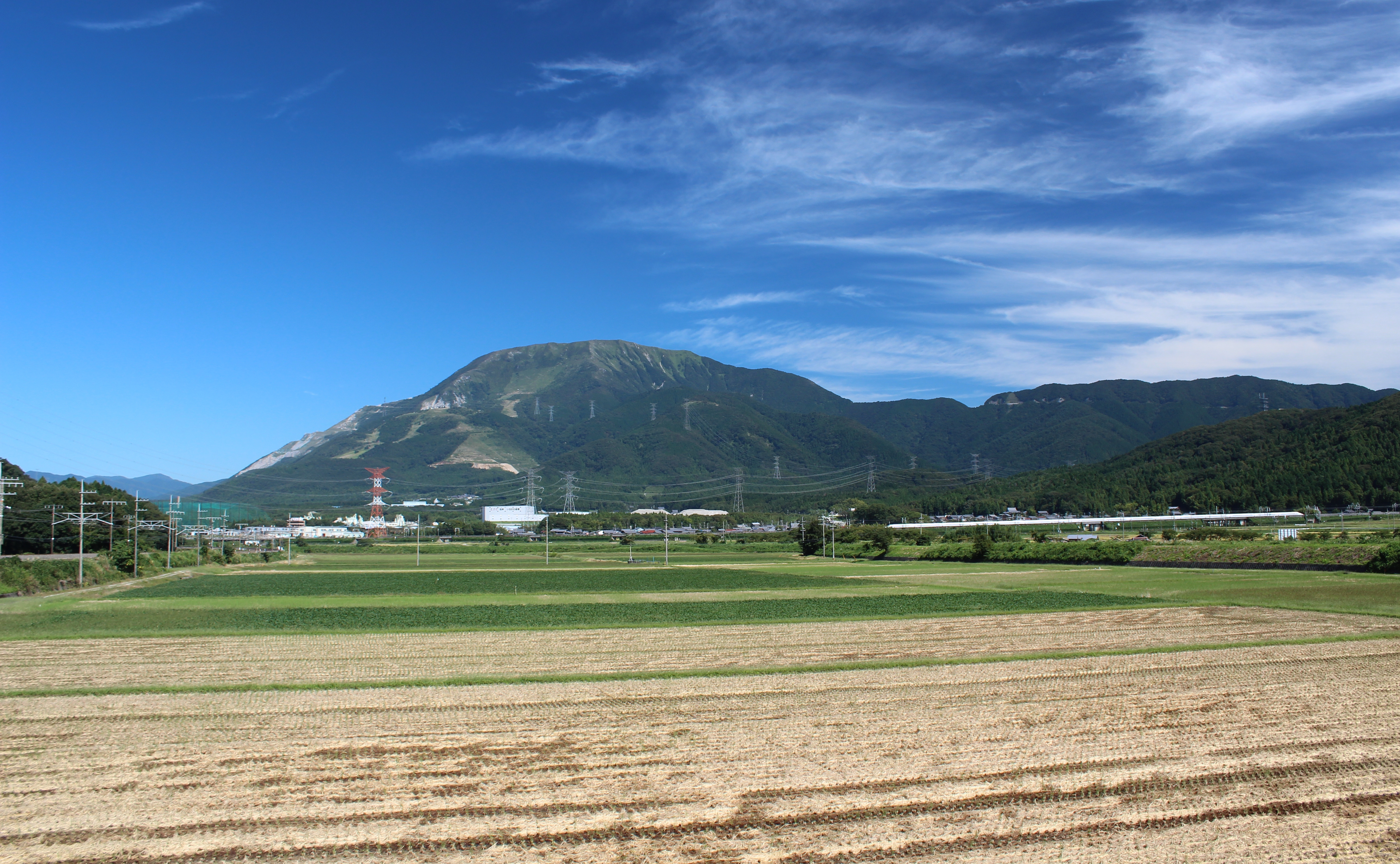
From Maibara

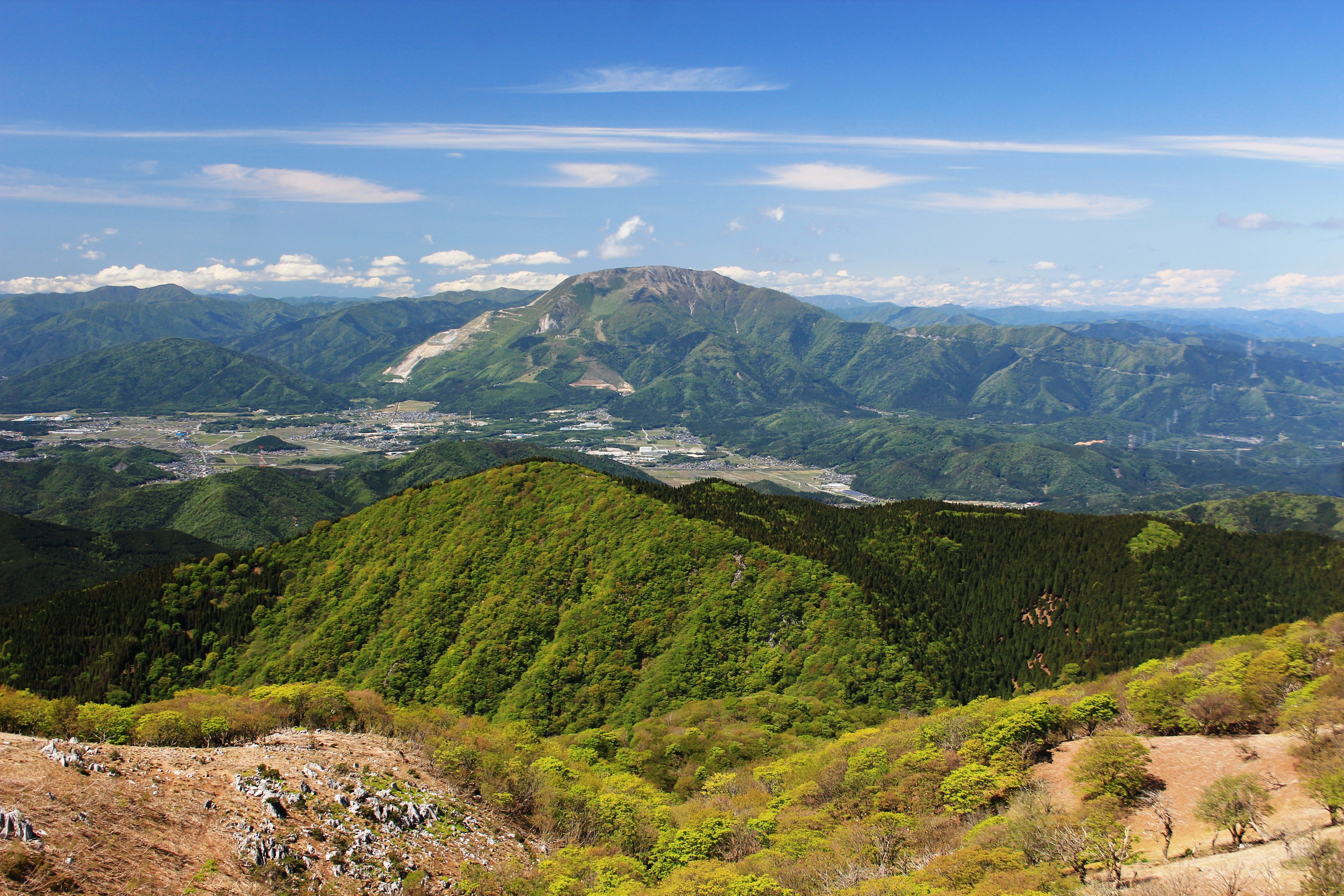
From Mount Ryōzen

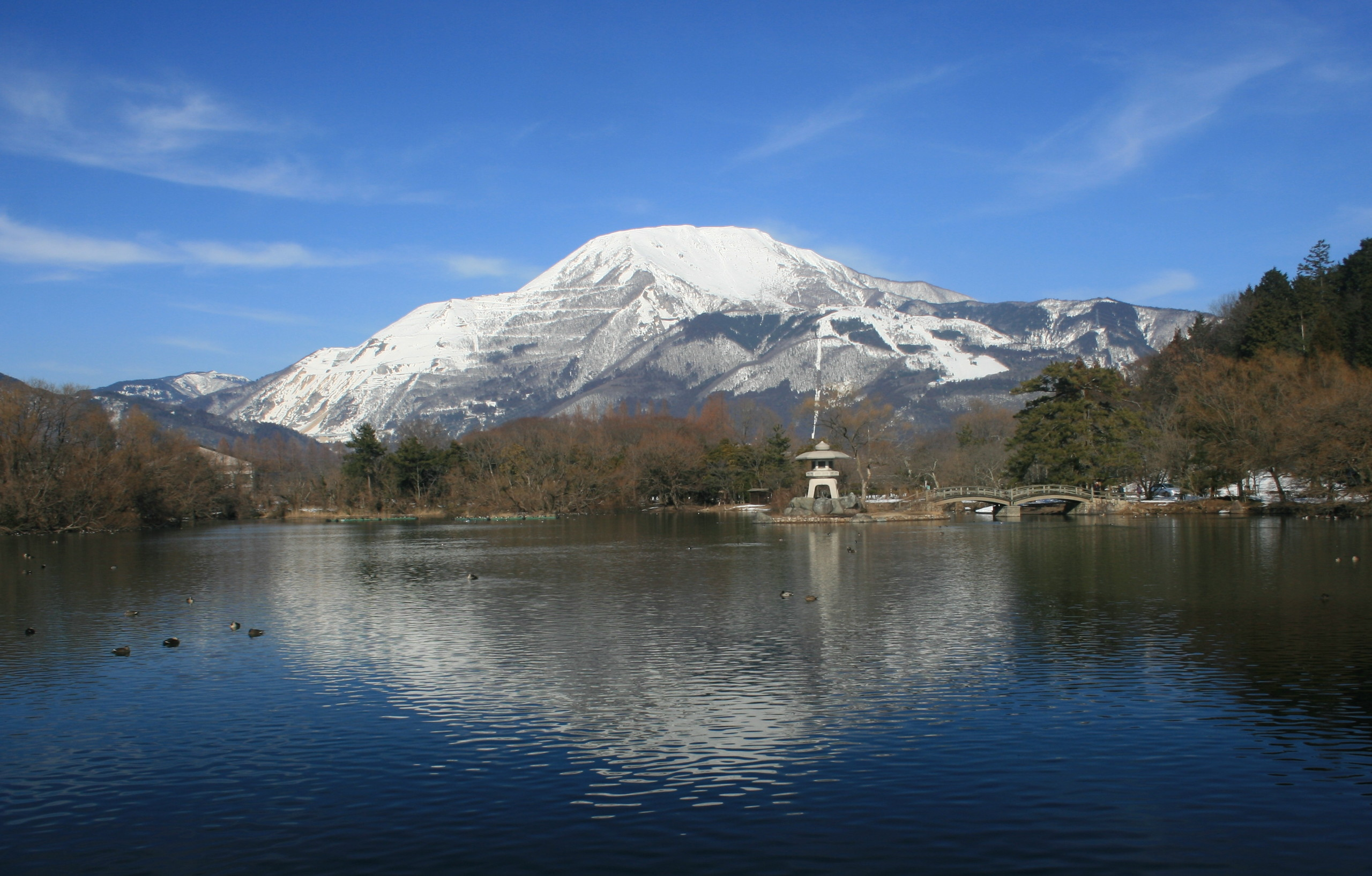
From Pond Mishima

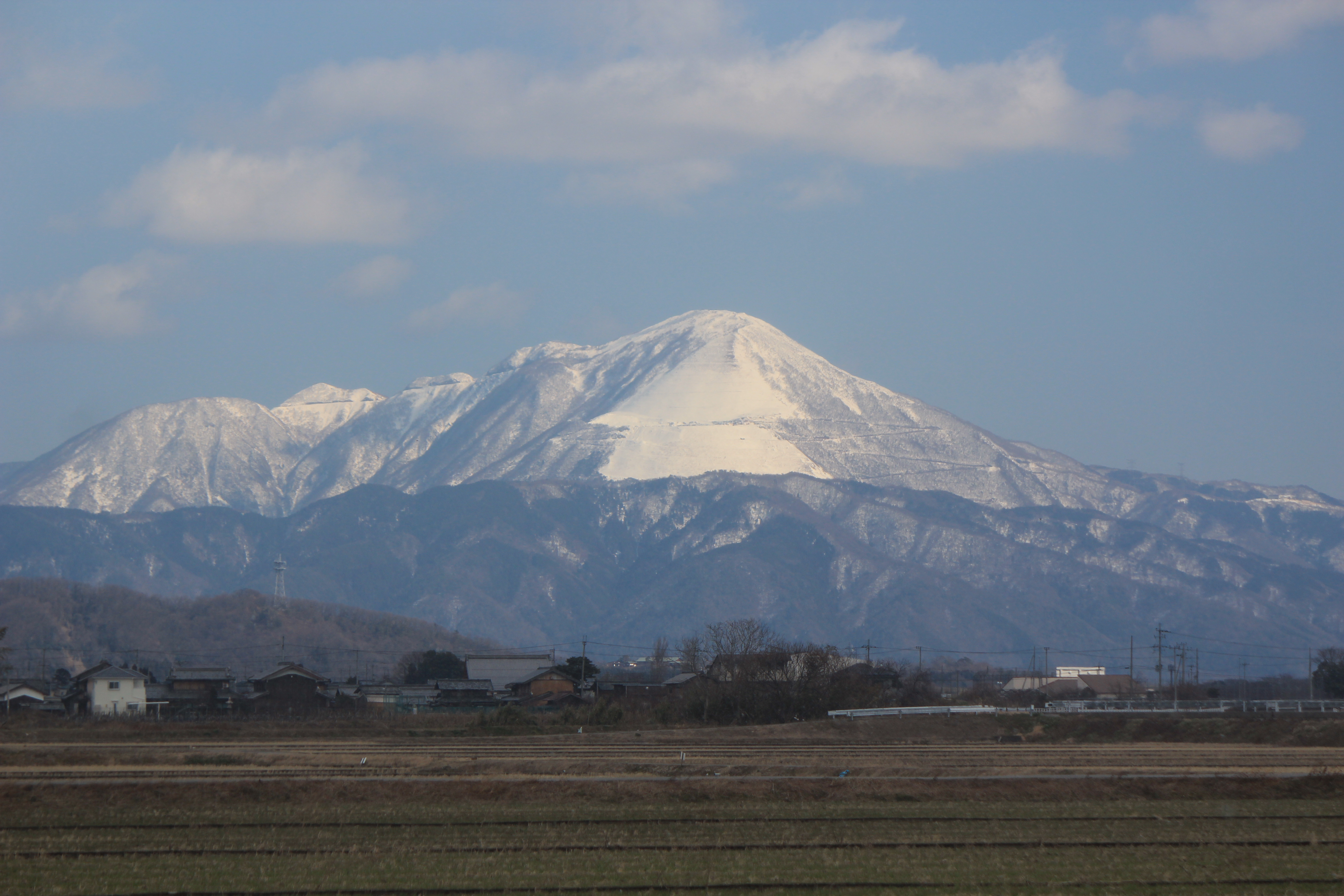
From Kohoku Mizudori station

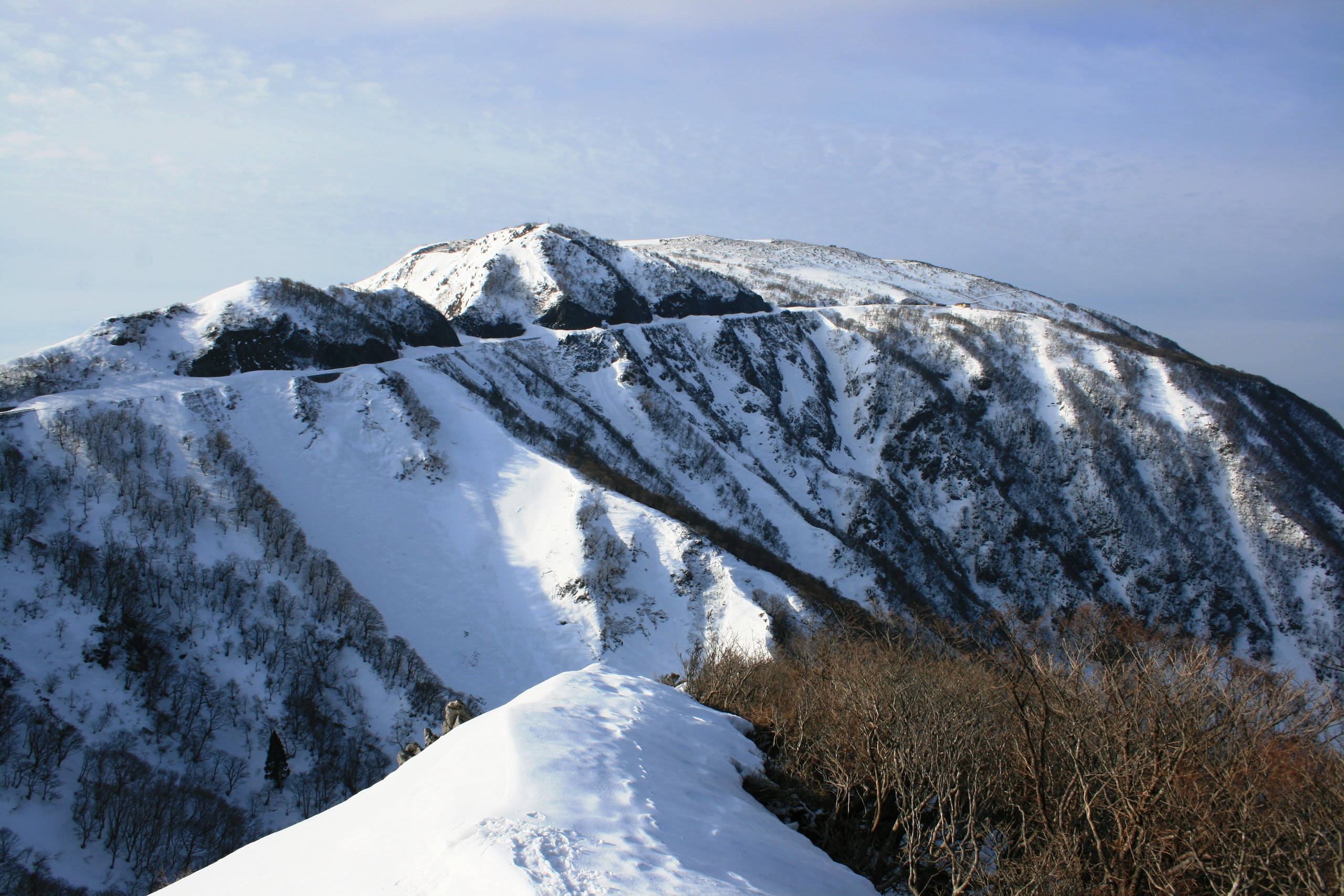
From Shizumagahara

== See also ==
- Japanese battlecruiser Ibuki
- Japanese cruiser Ibuki (1943)
- The 100 Views of Nature in Kansai
