= Chikubu Island =

Island in Lake Biwa, Shiga Prefecture, Japan

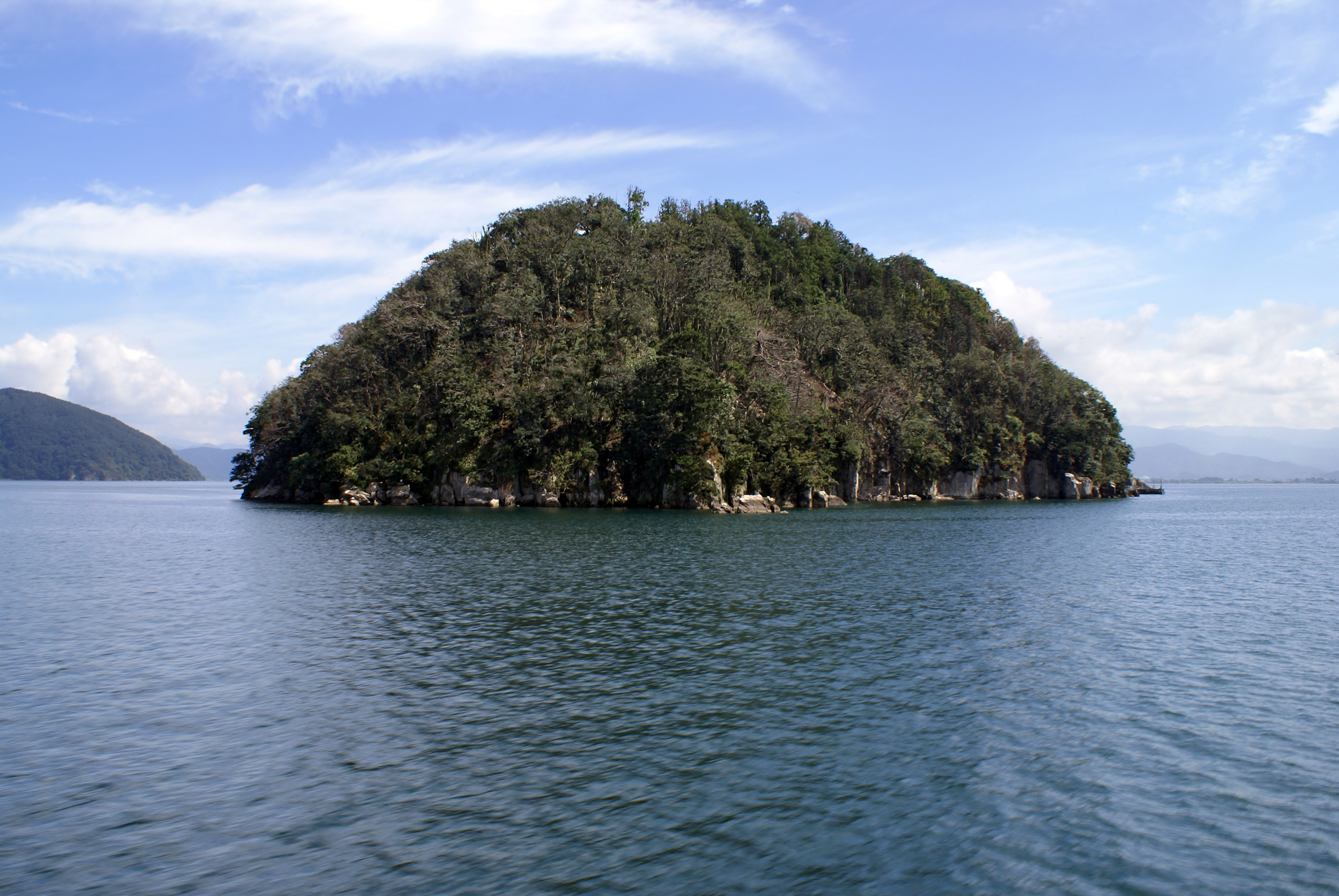
- Chikubu Island as viewed in Lake Biwa

- Location within Shiga Prefecture Location within Japan

Geography
- Coordinates: 35°25′20″N 136°8′37″E
- Area: 0.14 km^{2} (0.054 sq mi)
- Coastline: 2 km (1.2 mi)
- Highest elevation: 197 m (646 ft)

Administration
- Japan
- Region: Kansai
- Prefecture: Shiga
- City: Nagahama

Chikubu

Japanese name
- Kanji: 竹生島
- Hiragana: ちくぶしま
- Katakana: チクブシマ
Transcriptions
- Romanization: Chikubu

Chikubu (竹生島, Chikubushima) is a small island in the northern part of Lake Biwa in Shiga Prefecture, in the Kansai region of Japan. It has been known since ancient times for the beauty of its scenery and for its small Shinto shrine and Buddhist temples. Administratively, the island is part of the city of Nagahama, Shiga. The island is both a nationally designated Place of Scenic Beauty and Historic Site.

== Geology ==
Located about 2 kilometers south of Cape Tsuzurao, Chikubushima is the second largest island in Lake Biwa after Okishima. It has a circumference of about two kilometers and a maximum elevation of 197 meters. The entire island is a granite monolith with steep rock walls, with only one port located on the southern end. The bottom of the lake around the island is deep, and the western part is the deepest part of Lake Biwa (104.1meters). The temples, shrines and several souvenir shops are located near the harbor. Religious and store employees come from outside the island; the island is uninhabited at night.

The entire island was covered with evergreens until fairly recently. According to the vegetation survey data in Shiga Prefecture from 1972 to 1973, the island had dense groves of Castanopsis, Castanopsis cuspidata, Cinnamomum pedunculatum, Ilex integra, as well as Neolitsea sericea, and Camellia japonica, and Aralia elata among other species. However, from 1977 onward, a population of great cormorants began to colonise the area, displacing the previous existing heron population of the northern portion of the island and increased rapidly in numbers. By 2007 more than 40,000 birds were nesting on the island, creating tremendous environmental damage. Despite efforts to control the population by both non-lethal and lethal means, the population continued to increase to over 60,000 by 2008.

== Historical and cultural significance ==
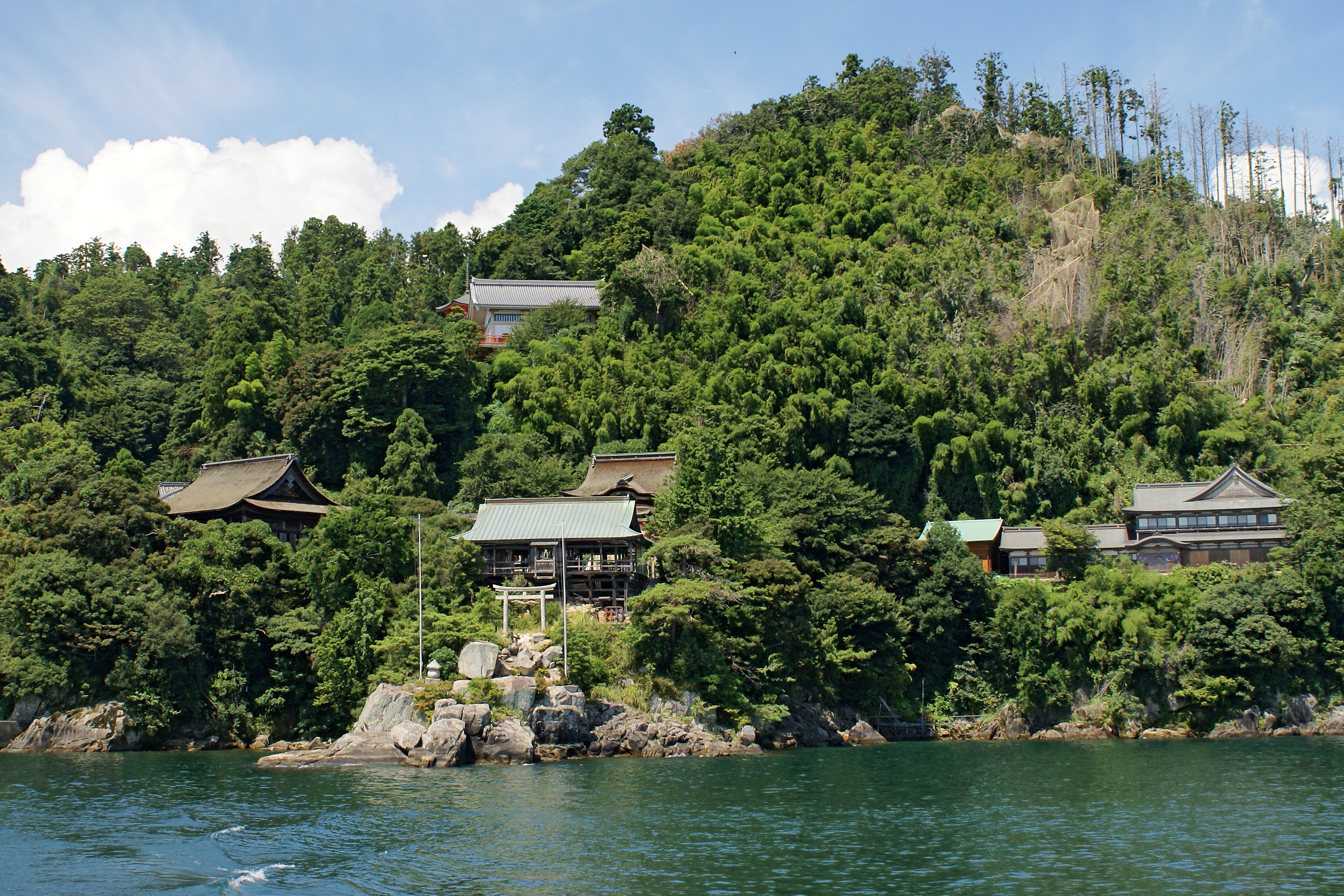
Chikubu Island coastline

Chikubushima was held to be a holy island since ancient times. During the Nara period, Gyōki is said to have built a chapel on the island to house statues of the Four Heavenly Kings, but its location and the veracity of this story is uncertain. In the south of the island, the Shinto shrine of Tsukubusuma claims to have been founded in 420 AD, and its associated Buddhist temple of Hōgon-ji in 724 AD. During the period of Shinbutsu-shūgō, this was a single entity formerly known as the "Chikubu Benzai-ten", which was ranked with the Enoshima Shrine in the Kantō region and the Itsukushima Shrine in the Chūgoku Region as one of Japan's Three Great Shrines of Benzaiten and was a popular spot for pilgrimage as No.30 on the Saigoku Kannon Pilgrimage route.

During the Sengoku period, retainers of Azai Nagamasa confined his father Hisamasa to Chikubushima, forcing him into retirement and establishing Nagamasa as his successor.

Many structures were brought to the island by Toyotomi Hideyori, son of general Toyotomi Hideyoshi. The temple's Kannon-dõ and the Karamon-style gate were brought here from the gravesite (Toyokuni-byo; now Toyokuni Shrine) of Toyotomi Hideyoshi. They originally stood in the Higashiyama ward of Kyoto, and are regarded as fine examples of architecture from the Azuchi-Momoyama period. Moreover, the Karamon gate of the temple and the honden of the shrine are both National Treasures of Japan.

During the Edo Period, the island designated as one of the Eight Views of Lake Biwa.

The shrine and the temple were formally separated by the decrees separating Buddhism from Shinto issued by the Meiji government, but the distinction still remains blurred at Chikubushima.

Several works of the Japanese performing arts relate to Chikubu. They include the Noh play Chikubushima and the Heike Biwa work Chikubushima Mōde, two koto melodies named Chikubushima, a jōruri (itchūbushi), a nagauta, and a tokiwazu-bushi of the same name.

== See also ==
- List of Historic Sites of Japan (Shiga)
- List of Places of Scenic Beauty of Japan (Shiga)
