= Hōgon-ji =

Buddhist temple in Nagahama, Shiga, Japan

- 宝厳寺
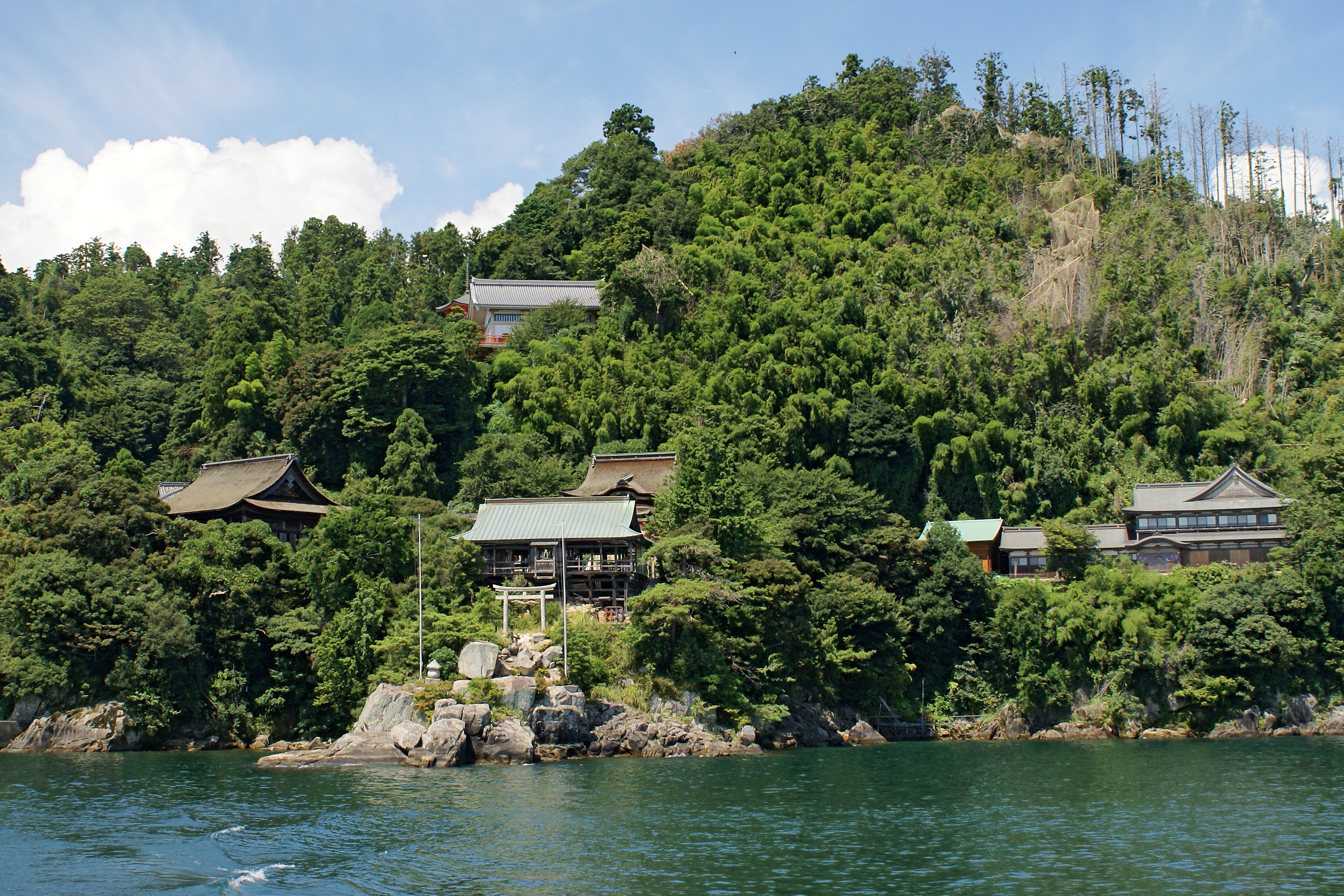
- Hōgon-ji Precincts

- Location within Shiga Prefecture Location within Japan

Religion
- Affiliation: Buddhist
- Deity: Benzaiten
- Rite: Shingon-shū Buzan-ha
- Status: functional

Location
- Location: 664 Hayasakicho, Nagahama-shi, Shiga-ken
- Country: Japan
- Coordinates: 35°25′16.04″N 136°8′35.61″E

Architecture
- Founder: c.Gyōki
- Completed: c.724
- National Treasure National Important Cultural Property National Place of Scenic Beauty National Historic Site of Japan

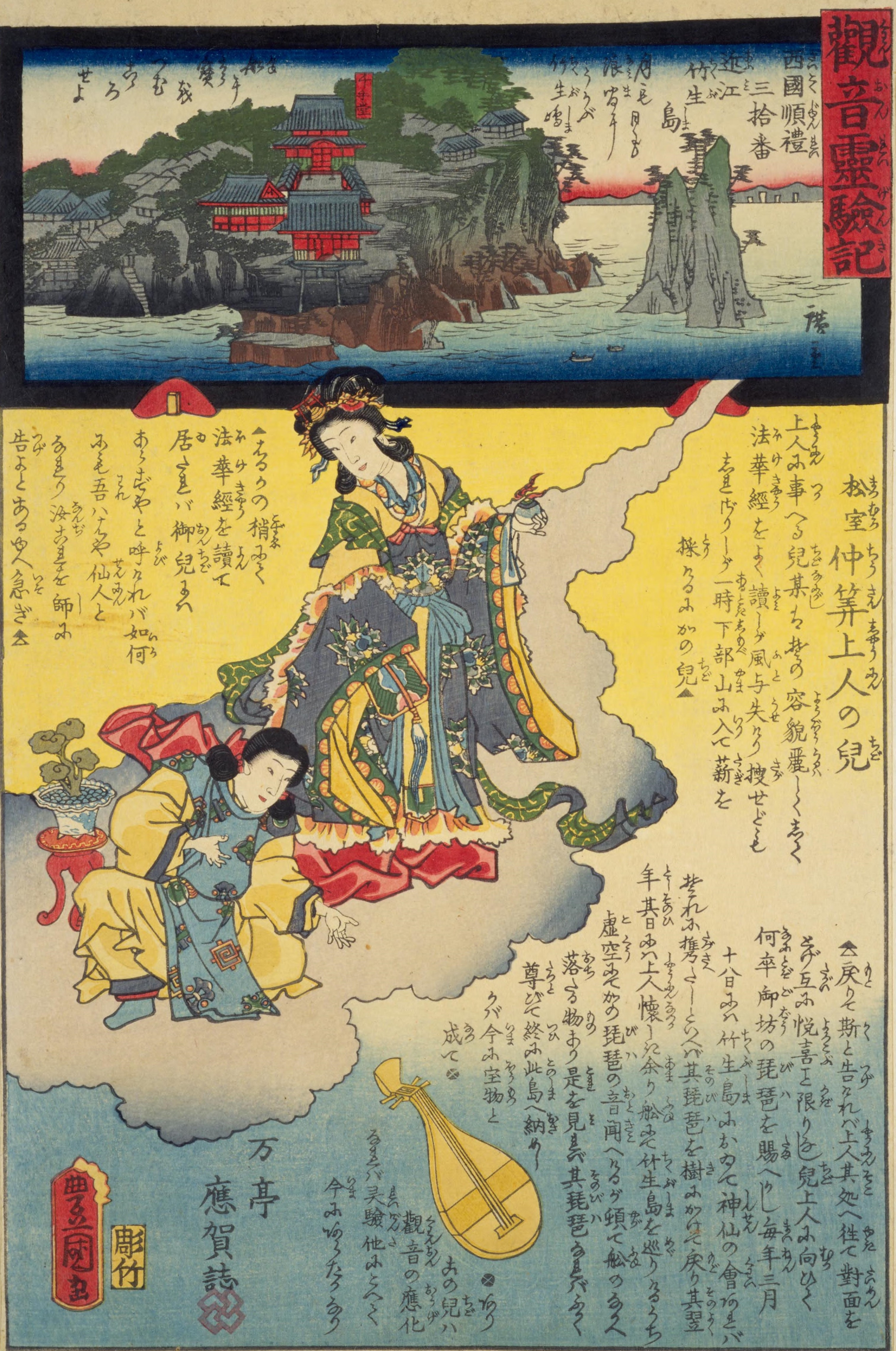
from the picture album "Kannon Reigen ki"

Hōgon-ji (宝厳寺) is a Buddhist temple located on Chikubushima in the city of Nagahama, Shiga Prefecture, Japan. It belongs to the Shingon-shū Buzan-ha sect of Japanese Buddhism and its honzon is a hibutsu statue of Benzaiten. The temple's full name is Iwakin-san Hōgon-ji (巖金山 寶嚴寺), but it is popularly known as the "Chikubushima Kannon". The temple is the 30th stop on the Saigoku Kannon Pilgrimage route.

== Overview ==
The island of Chikubushima, located near the northern tip of Lake Biwa, is a small island with a circumference of 2 kilometers and an area of approximately 0.14 square kilometers (see fig. 1). It has been designated a National Historic Site and Place of Scenic Beauty.

Except for a dock in the southeast, the island is surrounded by steep cliffs. It contains only a few souvenir shops and Hōgon-ji and Tsukubusuma Shrine. While the two are now separated, this distinction was only made after the Shinbutsu Bunri (law for separating Shinto and Buddhism) was enacted in the early Meiji period. From the Heian period through the early modern period, syncretistic Shinto-Buddhist worship was practiced on Chikubushima. The temple's main hall, the Kannon-dō, is directly connected to the honden of Tsukubusuma Shrine by two connecting corridors, demonstrating the original inseparable relationship between the two. Chikubushima is supposedly one of the places where the goddess Benzaiten, who is related to water and one of the Seven Gods of Luck, lived.

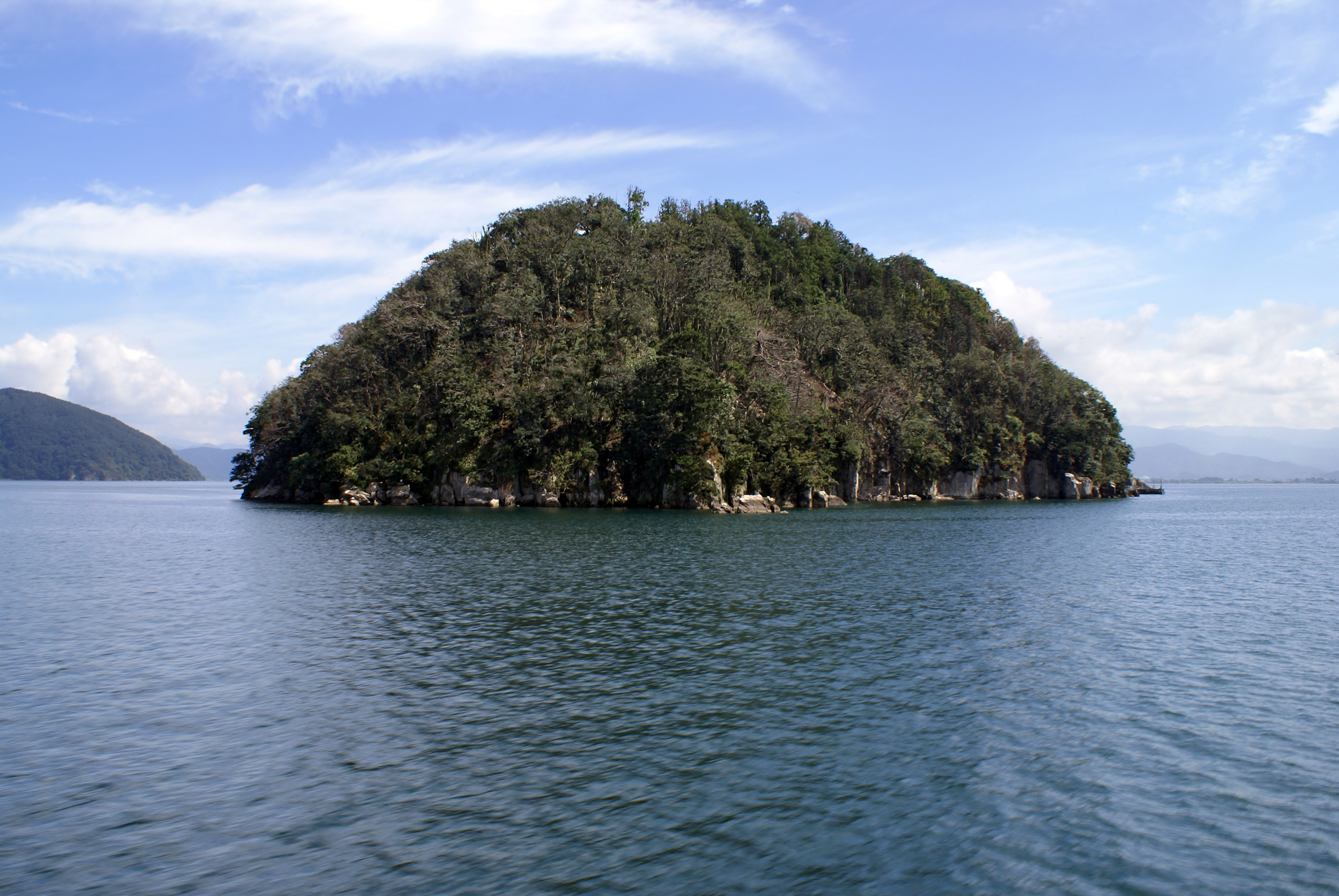
Figure 1 Chikubu Island

Benzaiten is the Japanese adaptation of the Indian goddess Sarasvati, who is also the goddess of eloquence, learning, military prowess, and a musician. The temple ranks with the Enoshima Shrine in the Kanto region, and the Itsukushima Shrine in the Chugoku region as the three great Japanese shrines dedicated to the goddess Benzaiten. The area of Lake Biwa and the surrounding mountains are mentioned many times in the famous Genji Monogatari.

== History ==
Hōgon-ji is said to have been founded by Gyōki during the Nara period. Gyōki was a monk who dedicated himself to social work such as bridge construction and flood control and irrigation. He is said to have enjoyed great support from the people. Many temples throughout the Kinki region are said to have been founded by Gyōki. According to the temple's legend, in 724, Emperor Shōmu had a dream in which Amaterasu appeared to him and told him, "There is a small island in the middle of a lake in Gōshū. This island is sacred to Benzaiten. Build a temple on it. Doing so will bring peace to the nation, bountiful harvests, and prosperity to all people." The emperor then issued an imperial command to Gyōki to visit Chikubushima Island and enshrine a statue of Benzaiten at Tsukubusuma Shrine, whose main deity was a kami named Azaihime-no-Mikoto. This is said to be the origin of the temple. The following year, in 725, Gyōki proposed the construction of a Kannon-dō, and later, the lord of Azai County, Ōmi Province, who carried on his wishes, enshrined a Senjū Kannon statue there.

However, the Chikubushima Engi, compiled in 931, states that Gyōki arrived on the island in 738, when he built a small chapel and enshrined the Four Heavenly Kings, marking the beginning of the temple. According to the same engi, in 753, a man named Azai Naomakai, the lord of Azai County, Ōmi Province, erected and enshrined the Senjū Kannon statue. Originally, the temple was called Hongō-ji and was under the control of Tōdai-ji. However, in the early Heian period, around the 10th century, like many other temples in Ōmi Province, it came under the umbrella of Enryaku-ji on Mount Hiei and became a Tendai temple. The island subsequently became a training ground for Tendai Buddhist monks.

Tsukufusuma Shrine, located next to the temple grounds, is listed in the Engishiki Shinmei-chō. However, since Azaihime-no-mikoto is said to be the guardian deity of the Azai clan and also a water deity who controls the lake, towards the end of the Heian period, this deity came to be identified with Benzaiten, the Buddhist water deity (originally a river deity of Indian origin). Eventually, Ichikishimahime-no-mikoto, who is also considered to be the same as Benzaiten, was also enshrined, and as a result of the syncretism of Shinto and Buddhism, Tsukufusuma Shrine became integrated with the temple. Eventually, the temple and shrine names merged, and the island became known as "Chikubushima Daijingū-ji" or "Chikubushima Gongen". The temple buildings have been destroyed by fires on several occasions, notably in 1232 and 1454, but have been rebuilt each time. Another fire occurred in 1558, but in 1602, Toyotomi Hideyori ordered Katagiri Katsumoto to rebuild the temple. During the Toyotomi era, the Karamon Gate (a National Treasure (NT)), the Kannon-dō (an Important Cultural Property (ICP)), the connecting corridor (ICP), and the main hall (now the honden of Tsukufusuma Shrine, (NT) connected to the connecting corridor were reconstructed. The Karamon Gate was relocated from the Toyokuni Mausoleum in Kyoto, while the main hall was relocated from either Toyokuni Shrine or from the Higurashi Palace or Imperial Envoy Hall in Fushimi Castle.

Even during the Edo period, the temple remained popular as a pilgrimage site for Benzaiten worship and as a temple on the Saigoku Kannon Pilgrimage. However, following the Meiji era's separation of Shinto and Buddhism, the government forced the name of the main hall, Benten-dō, to be changed to "Tsukufusuma Shrine," as it appears in the Heian-period Engishiki. In 1871, the Ōtsu Prefectural Government ordered the abolition of Hōgon-ji as a Buddhist temple, putting the temple in a critical state. However, the temple insisted that Benzaiten was a Buddhist deity, not a Shinto kami. Ultimately, the religious facilities on Chikubushima were separated into Hōgon-ji Temple and Tsukufusuma Shrine. When the boundary between the "temple" and "shrine" was established in 1874, the building that had been the temple's main hall became the honden of Tsukufusuma Shrine. The property was divided between the temple and shrine in 1883, and has remained under their respective management ever since. Since the separation of the temple and shrine, Hōgon-ji was left without a main hall; the current main hall was built in 1942.

== Architectural style ==
=== Hondō ===
The original temple was rebuilt in 1602 so there is no real documentation on what it actually looked like. However, the rebuilt Hōgon-ji strongly resembles the common architectural attributes of a Buddhist Amida Hall. Amida Halls, however, did not reportedly start being built until around 1051 CE Hōgon-ji (see fig. 4) seen today is a good example of traditional Japanese twists on Chinese architecture. This can be seen in the Chinese trait of the temple being off the ground on a base platform. However, despite the fact that the temple is on an elevated platform, it does not make the building look isolated and removed from its environment as some Chinese structures appear to be, but instead the Japanese architects have made it appear as if it is floating on the terrain and integrated with the environment. The fact that the Hōgon-ji was built in honor of Benzaiten probably explains why the temple looks like it is floating on the ground and why flowing lines in the architecture are important.

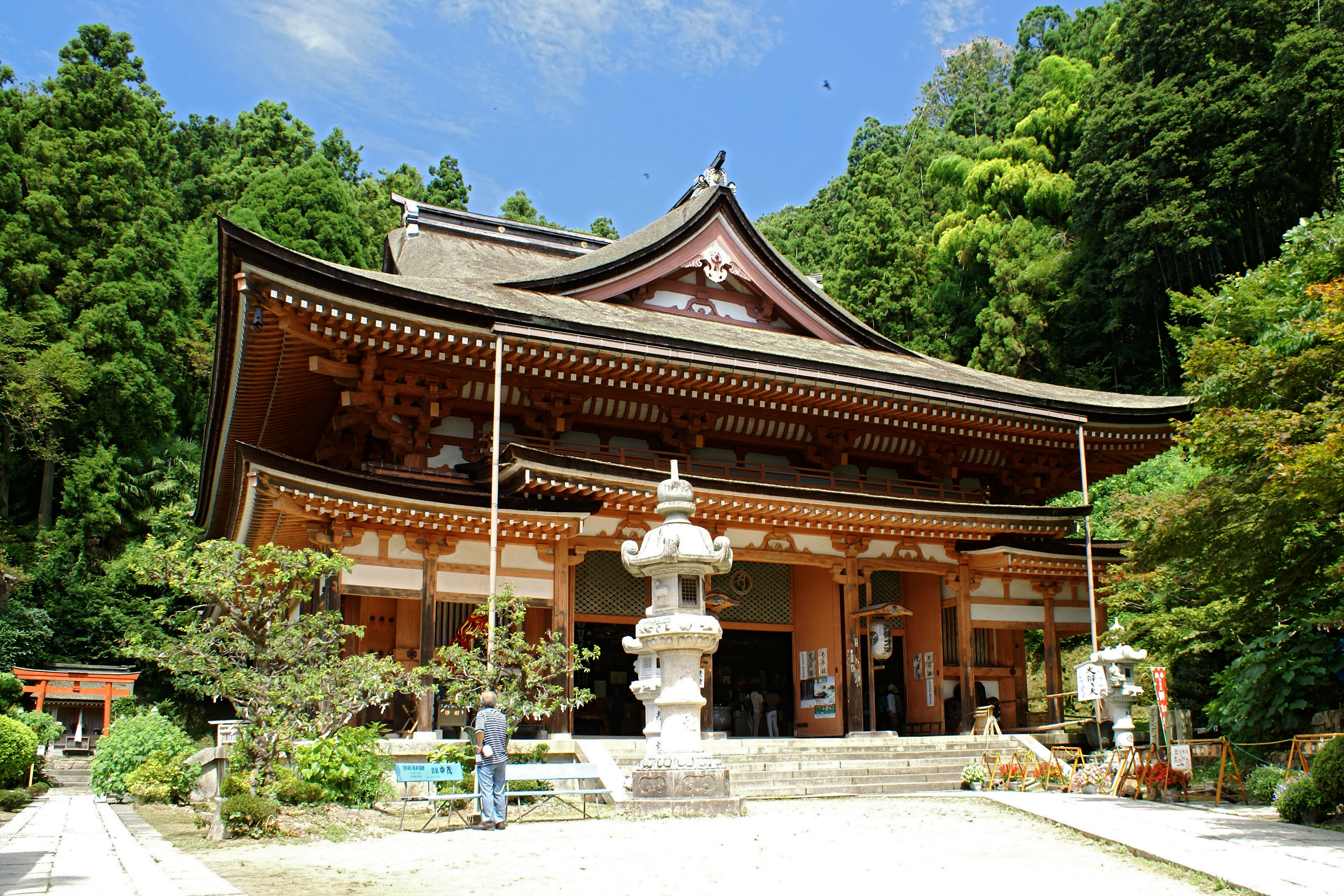
Figure 4 Hogon-ji Temple

The temple obviously uses the traditional Chinese and Japanese post-and-lintel style. This is evidenced in the vertical columns that support horizontal beams. The front of the temple appears to have three bays or architectural sections, one bay on the left side of the doors, the bay with the three doors, and the bay on the right side of the doors. On top of the wooden vertical columns in the front of the temple are typical Japanese 3-on-1 bracket complexes. These bracket complexes are what support the horizontal beams above them. The three part eave on the front of the temple is a stylistic trait of the Amida Halls. The middle section of the temple's exterior makes the temple look as if it is more than one story; however, due to the style of Amida Halls it is most likely just a mokoshi. A mokoshi is a gap in the architectural rafters that make a structure appear more stories than it actually is. Mokoshi also make a structure appear as if it has one roof over another. Three-stepped bracket complexes that support the actual roof are composed of three of the 3-on-1 looking brackets stacked on top of each other with each 3-on-1 bracket supporting a ceiling beam. The ends of these beams can be seen decoratively sticking out from the structure at the corners of the actual roof. This bracket system is a very common trait of traditional Japanese architecture. It is documented that the more complex a structure's bracket system is, the more important it is considered. The square flying rafters that extend just to the edge of the underside of the eave roofs and actual roof are a touch that both accentuates the curvature of the roofs and adds a natural element of simple decoration. As apparent, the roof is indeed curved, a trait carried over from Chinese architecture. However, Chinese curved roofs were curved much shallower than their Japanese successors. As seen in fig. 4, the curvature of the temple's actual roof is quite drastic. Also, the downward angle of the actual roof itself is quite steep. This angle is most likely to help with rainwater run-off and symbolic of apotropaic qualities. Curved roofs were commonly believed to ward off evil spirits because evil spirits hated curves and that they would also fall off of the roof due to its drastic angle. Thus, curved roofs are very commonly used in Chinese and Japanese architecture. The sag in both the eave roof and the actual roof is a trait reminiscent of Chinese architecture. Yet, the upward turned corners of the roof are a distinctly Japanese trait that was not seen in Japanese architecture before the Heian period. The temple has what is termed a hogyō, a pyramidal roof that converges at a central point. Also commonly seen in Chinese and Japanese architecture are ridges curving along the top curves of the actual roof. Overall, the architecture of the temple is very plain and undecorated compared to some of the more ornate temples. This could be because the temple is Buddhist and therefore, its patrons hold to the idea of moderation in life. Yet, because of its simplicity it looks very elegant, flowing, and natural in the surrounding environment.

=== Karamon Gate ===
The Karamon Gate was moved to its current location during the temple's renovation in 1602 (see fig. 5).

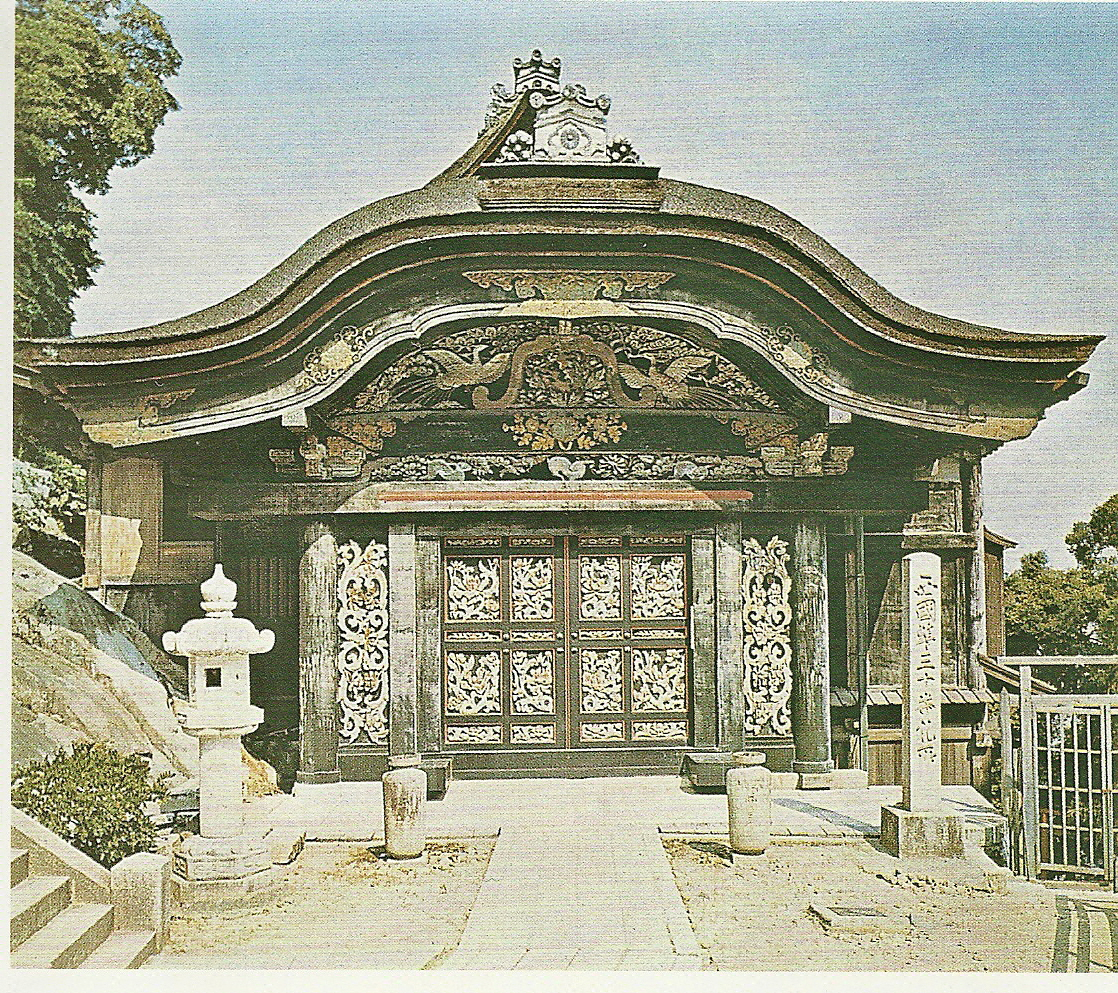
Figure 5 Karamon Gate Side 1

It was originally from the Toyokuni Mausoleum in Kyoto where Toyotomi Hideyoshi's grave is located. The gate itself is an excellent example of Momoyama period artwork known for its extensive decoration and vibrant colors, even though the architecture of the gate is more Chinese than Japanese. Another aspect to notice is the presence of Buddhist iconography in the gate's artwork. One facet of the Karamon Gate's Chinese architecture is that it uses the previously mentioned post-and-lintel style. Also, the structure uses the common 3-on-1 bracket complexes in holding up the gate and the gate's roof. The gate has a karahafu, or "Chinese gable" roof. As seen in fig. 5, the gate has a unique roof curvature that is distinctly Chinese in style. The gate is highly decorated with wood carvings, metal ornaments, polychrome, and sculptural forms. Paintings and carvings of flowers are vastly used overall in the gate's décor, and one entire side of the doors is covered in wood carvings of peonies. Also, seen in the triangular space on the side of the roof is a bright gold phoenix sculptural figure and cloud decorations. Phoenixes are also a popular decoration for this gate. Not only are phoenixes seen on the side of the roof, but they are also seen at the top of the door on side 1 (see fig. 5). Phoenixes are not the only mythological creature portrayed in the decorations of this gate. On the bracket complex on the left door post appears to be the head of a Japanese Lion Dog. These dogs are a common near Japanese temples and shrines as they are seen as apotropaic, and supposedly ward off evil spirits. They are most often seen in pairs, representing the duality of life. They are Buddhist in origin because their image originated from the lion, which was a symbol of Buddha. The amount of decoration and vibrancy of colors used on the Karamon Gate appear to be a complete antithesis to the Hōgon-ji itself. By the differences in style, architecture, and decoration, it is obvious that the gate is not a part of the original temple complex. The open corridor that leads to the Tsukubusuma Shrine (see fig. 8)

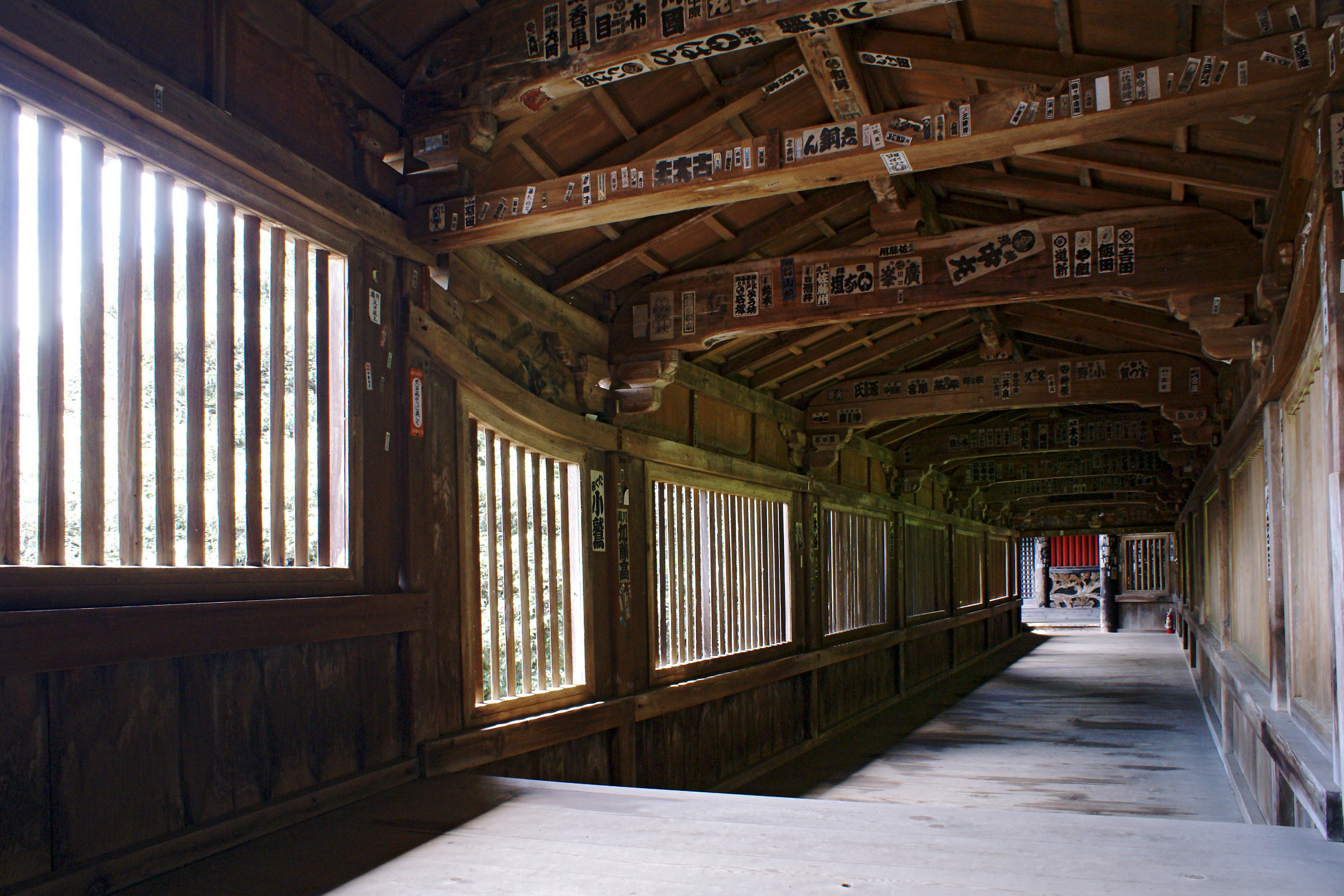
Figure 8 Funa Corridor

is special because it is built of the wood of the "Nihonmaru," Toyotomi Hideyoshi's ship.

== Hogon-ji's pagoda ==
Up a flight of stairs from the Hondō is the temple complex's pagoda (see fig. 9). It burned down in the early Edo Period and was rebuilt following the original plan. The pagoda is three tiered and reminiscent of traditional Japanese style pagodas in architecture. It is of traditional orange and red coloring. Also, it uses the traditional post-and-lintel style, as previously explained. It has three-stepped bracket complexes, as previously discussed. It consists of three bays, and a central core that runs the entire height of the structure ending in the finial on top. The central pole is evidence that pagodas are like Indian stupas in that it is a common trait in the architecture. The finial

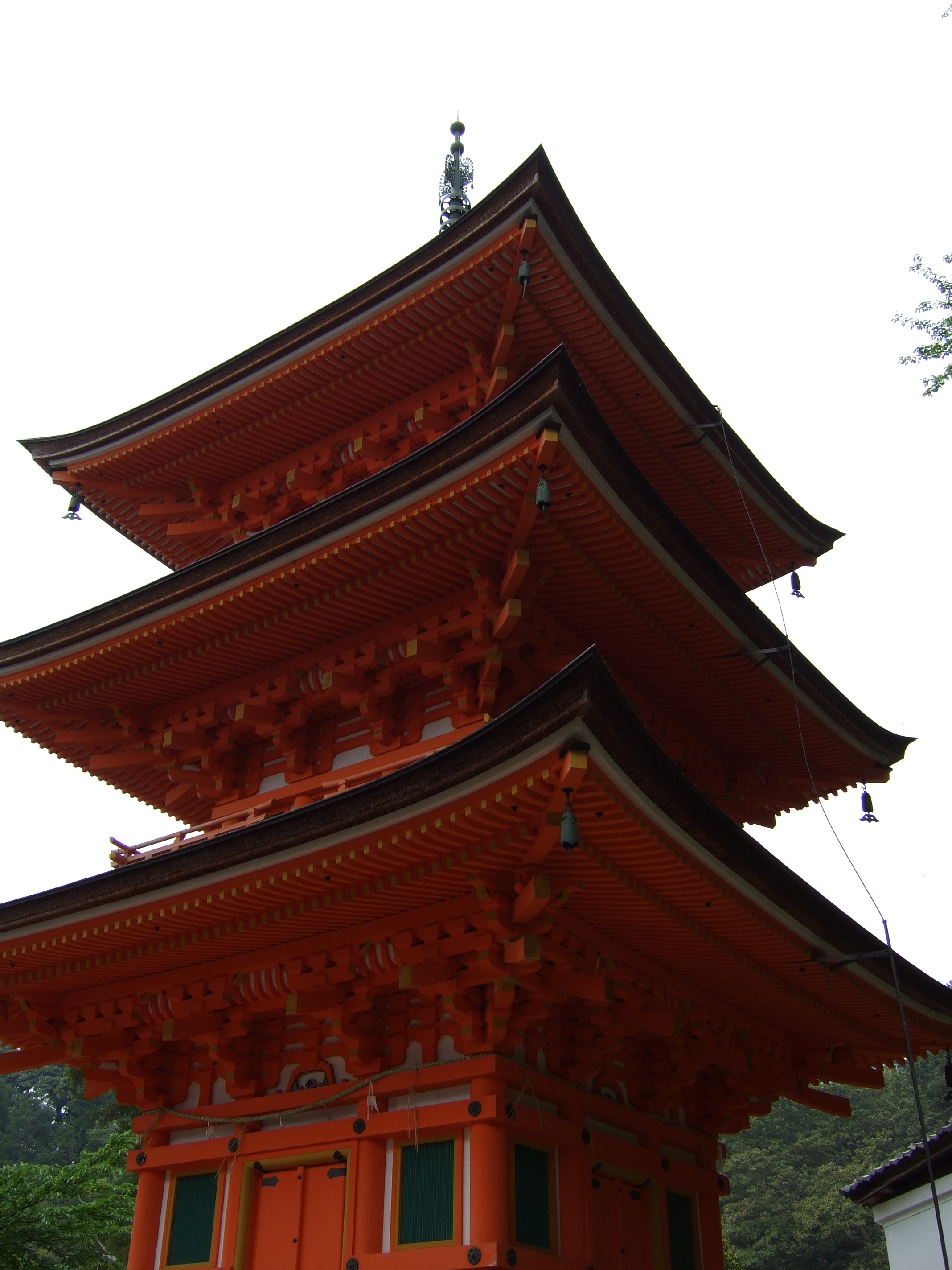
Figure 9 Hogon-ji's Pagoda

on top is a symbol of the Buddha, in that it represents an umbrella. An umbrella being significant in that it is a symbol of the historical Buddha's royal lineage and prestige. Pagodas in general are a Japanese adaptation of the Indian stupa. This is also evidenced by the fact that pagodas were for inducing meditation, circumambulation, and supposedly held a relic of Buddha. This pagoda has two main apotropaic characteristics. One is the obvious curved roof. The other characteristic is the bells hanging at the corners of the roofs that supposedly scare off evil spirits. Overall, the architecture of this structure looks much more decorated than that of the Hogon-ji Temple in its complex use of intersecting beams on the exterior as ornamentation.

== Hogon-ji's treasure house ==
Next to the temple complex's pagoda is the Treasure House. Here several important artifacts relevant to the temple's history are stored. An example of such artifacts include: tapestries, pipes, Nō masks, swords, and Buddhas. A tapestry of Benzaiten resides there. In it she is portrayed with only two arms and a biwa, or Japanese lute. This form that emphasized her musical attributes was very popular in Japanese artwork. Seen around her head is a halo, thus emphasizing her divinity. Her robes look very soft due to the curvy lines used. This image is much more reminiscent of the Japanese iconography of deities than that of Indian iconography because the figure appears as organic and soft, not a stiff, stern, and untouchable being. Another evidence of this is the fact that the lines used are not geometric, a trait common in the Indian iconography of deities.

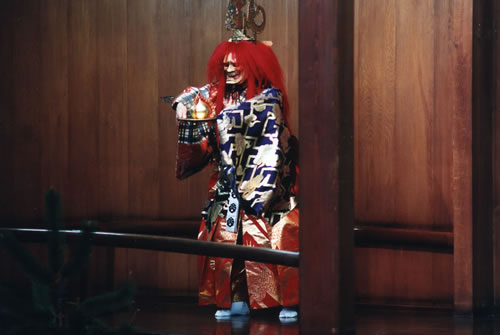
Figure 11 Nō Actor Wearing Mask

Nō masks worn by the actors in that type of theatre (see fig. 11) are especially relevant to the temple's history in that Chikubu Island was the location and Benzaiten was the subject of the famous Nō play, Chikubushima. The play follows the pilgrimage of a court official to Chikubu Island in his journey to pay homage to the deity there. He arrives at the island by an old couples fishing boat and then learns his lesson of judging people because it actually turns out that the old woman is Benzaiten, and the old man the Dragon God of Lake Biwa. The play finally ends with Benzaiten and the Dragon God of Lake Biwa returning to their divine abodes after they both have performed marvelous dances.

== Cultural Properties ==
=== National Treasures ===
- Karamon (唐門), Azuchi-Momoyama period (1603)
- Preface to the Lotus Sutra (法華経序品（じょほん）（竹生島経）), Heian period; paper with gold and silver ink designs of flowers, birds, and other motifs. It's an early example of this type of "decorative sutra," dating from the 11th century. On loan to the Nara National Museum.

=== National Important Cultural Properties ===
- Hogon-ji (宝厳寺), consisting of three structures:
  - Kannon-do (観音堂), Azuchi-Momoyama period (1603)
  - Low-roofed Corridor (渡廊(低屋根)), Azuchi-Momoyama period (1603)
  - High-roofed Corridor (渡廊(高屋根)), Azuchi-Momoyama period (1603)
- Stone Five-story Pagoda (石造五重塔), late-Kamakura period (1275-1332)
- Tachi Sword (Unsigned) (毛抜形太刀〈無銘(伝藤原秀郷奉納)／), Heian period; supposedly donated by Fujiwara no Hidesato
- Copper Water Jug (銅水瓶), Kamakura period (1288);
- Bronze Seal (Inscription: "Suruga Kura Seal") (銅印〈印文「駿河倉印」／〉), Nara period;
- Colored Silk Painting of 16 Rakan (絹本著色十六羅漢図), Nanboku-cho period;
- Colored Silk Painting of Shaka Sanzon (絹本著色釈迦三尊像), Kamakura period;
- Colored Silk Painting of Nyoirin Kannon (絹本著色如意輪観音像), Kamakura period;
- Colored Silk Painting of Amida Raigo (絹本著色阿弥陀来迎図), Kamakura period;
- Colored Silk Painting of the Big Dipper and the Nine Stars (絹本著色北斗九星像), South Sung dynasty;
- Embroidered plaque of the Ten Female Rākṣasa (刺繍普賢十羅刹女図額), Nanboku-cho;
- Embroidered plaque of Amida Sanzon (刺繍阿弥陀三尊来迎図額), Kamakura-cho;
- Document: List of items brought by Kukai (空海請来目録), Heian period;
- Document: The Lotus Sutra's Chapter on Merit and Distinction (法華経分別功徳品), Kamakura period (1253);
- Chikubushima Documents (竹生島文書(三百十二通)), Kamakura to Edo period; 312 items

=== National Registered Tangible Cultural Property ===
- Benzaiten-do (弁才天堂), Showa period (1942)

=== Shiga Prefecture Designated Tangible Cultural Properties ===
- Colored silk painting of Benzaiten (絹本着色弁才天像), Nanboku-cho period
- Wooden statue of seated Fudo Myoo (木造不動明王坐像), Heian period
- The Great Perfection of Wisdom Sutra (大般若波羅蜜多経), Kamakura-Muromachi period; 550 volume

=== Nagahama City Designated Tangible Cultural Properties ===
- Wooden statue of seated Benzaiten (木造弁才天坐像), Muromachi period
- Waniguchi (鰐口), Muromachi period

== See also ==
- Three Great Shrines of Benzaiten
- List of National Treasures of Japan (temples)
- List of National Treasures of Japan (writings: others)
- List of Historic Sites of Japan (Shiga)
- List of Places of Scenic Beauty of Japan (Shiga)
