= Chōmei-ji =

Buddhist temple in Ōmihachiman, Shiga, Japan

- 長命寺
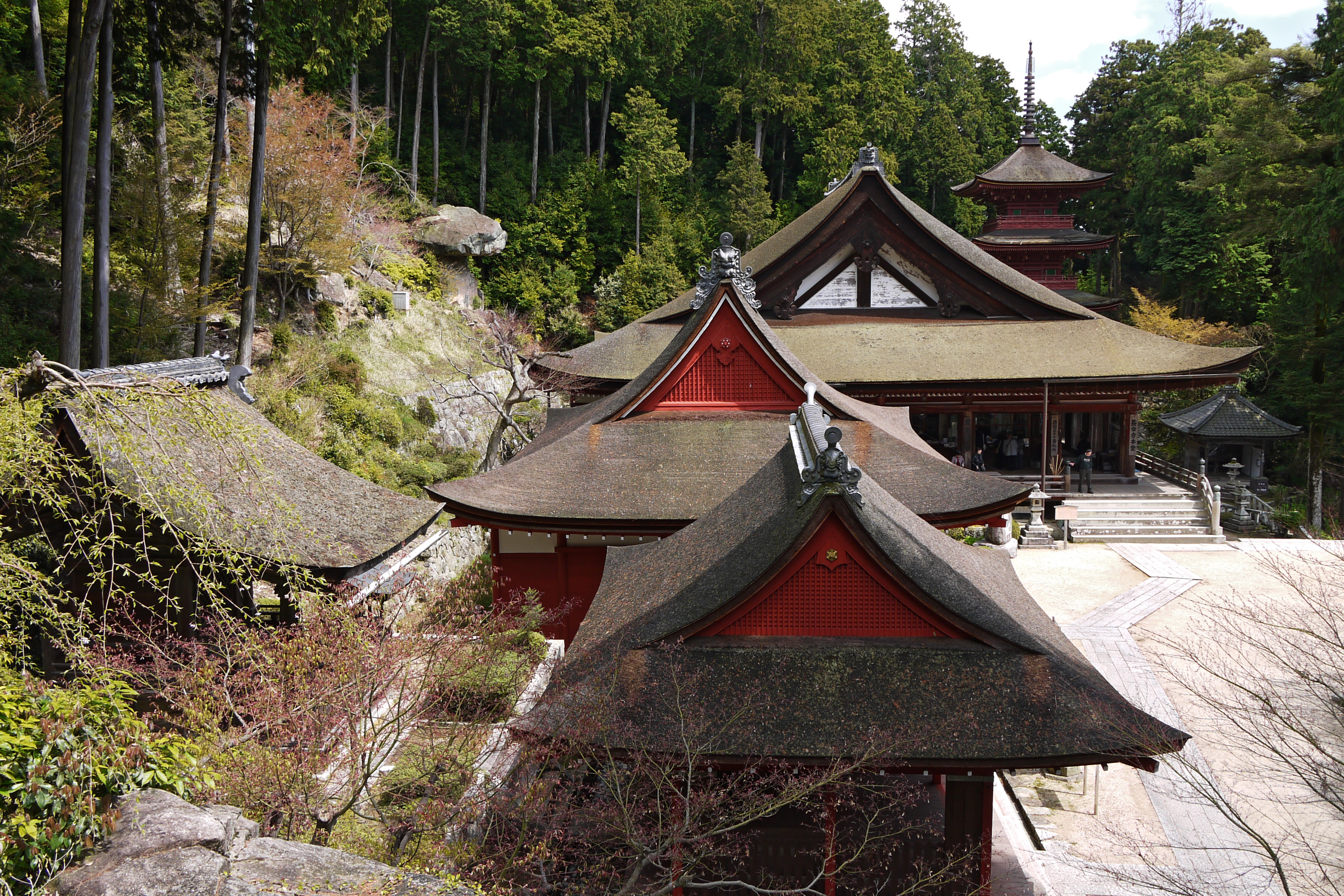
- Chōmei-ji Precincts

- Location within Shiga Prefecture Location within Japan

Religion
- Affiliation: Buddhist
- Deity: Senjū Kannon Bosatsu (Sahasrabhuja); Jūichimen Kannon Bosatsu; Shō-Kannon Bosatsu
- Rite: Tendai
- Status: functional

Location
- Location: 157 Chōmei-chō, Ōmihachiman-shi, Shiga-ken 523-0808
- Country: Japan
- Interactive map of Chōmei-ji
- Coordinates: 35°9′45.66″N 136°3′50.41″E

Architecture
- Founder: c.Prince Shōtoku
- Completed: c.619
- National Important Cultural Property

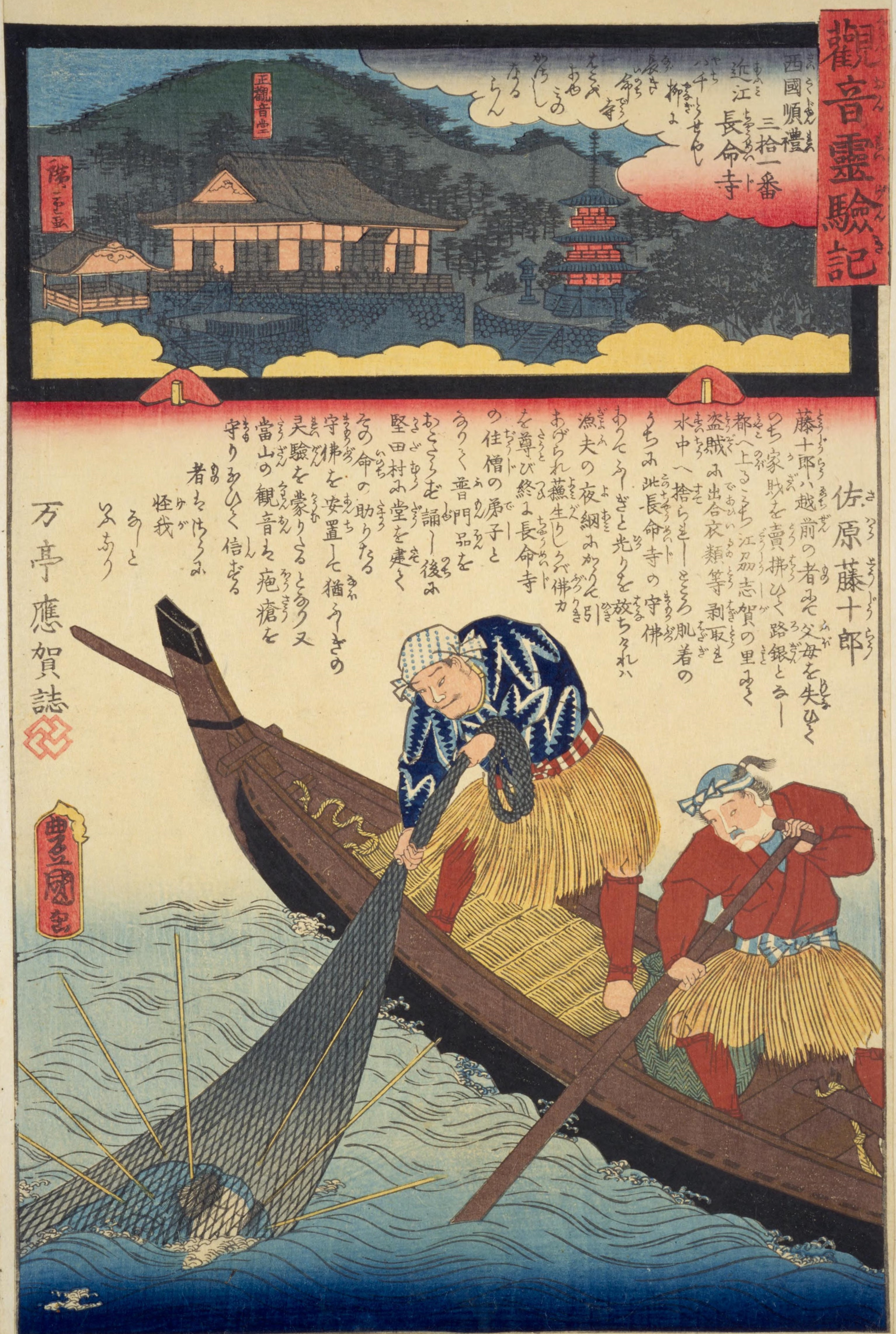
Ukiyoe from Kan'on reigenki

Chōmei-ji (長命寺) is a Buddhist temple located in the Chōmeiji neighborhood of the city of Ōmihachiman, Shiga Prefecture, Japan. It belongs to the Tendai sect of Japanese Buddhism and its honzon (primary image) is a statue of Senjū Kannon Bosatsu (Sahasrabhuja), the bodhisattva of 1000 arms. The temple's full name is Ikiya-san Chōmei-ji (綺耶山 長命寺). The temple is the 31st stop on the 33-temple Saigoku Kannon Pilgrimage route. It is unique in that its honzon is a trinity of Senjū Kannon, Jūichimen Kannon Bosatsu and Shō-Kannon statues. The temple is located on the eastern shore of Lake Biwa, at an elevation of about 250 meters on the southwestern slope of Mount Chōmyōji, which is 333 meters above sea level. In the past, pilgrims would arrive at the temple by boat from Chikubushima Hōgon-ji the 30th temple of the pilgrimage, and disembark at the port at the foot of the mountain to visit. The dock at the foot of the mountain is also the entrance to the Chōmyōji River, a waterway to Azuchi, making it a key transportation hub. On April 24, 2015, the temple was designated a Japan Heritage Site as part of the "Lake Biwa and its Waterside Landscapes - A Water Heritage of Prayer and Life" project.

== History ==
According to legend, during the reign of Emperor Keikō, Takenouchi no Sukune carved the words "Long life and fulfillment of all wishes" into a willow tree here, praying for longevity. This is said to have resulted in Sukune's long life of 300 years. Later, in the 27th year of the reign of Empress Suiko (619), Prince Shōtoku visited the area and discovered the inscriptions carved by Sukune during his prayer. As he gazed upon them, a white-haired old man appeared and told him to carve a Buddha statue from the tree and place it here. Prince Shōtoku immediately carved an Jūichimen Kannon statue and enshrined it on the site, thus founding the temple. It is said that Prince Shōtoku named the temple Chōmei-ji in honor of Sukune's longevity. As the name suggests, it is said that those who worship at the temple will live a long life.

The actual founding date and circumstances of the temple's founding are unknown. The first appearance of the name Chōmei-ji in a reliable historical document is in a document called "Okushima Shoji Hajisuke Masahata Land Donation Letter" dated March 2, 1074.

In 1184, Sasaki Sadatsuna erected the Sanbutsudō Hall to commemorate the soul of his father, Sasaki Hideyoshi, who was killed in battle during the Mikka-Taira Rebellion. The temple complex was further expanded in the late Heian period with the construction of the main hall, Shaka-dō, Yakushi-dō, Taishi-dō, Gōma-dō, Hōtō Pagoda, Shōrō, and Niōmon Gate. From then until the Kamakura period, the temple was revered by the Rokkaku clan, the shugo of Ōmi Province. According to ancient documents preserved at the temple, Chōmei-ji was a brance of the West Pagoda of Enryaku-ji on Mount Hiei and enjoyed the patronage of the Rokkaku clan into the Muromachi period.

The honzon Kannon statues are hibutsu hidden images and are not normally open to the public. To commemorate the 1,000th anniversary of the death of cloistered Emperor Kazan, who is said to be the restorer of the Saigoku Thirty-three Kannon Pilgrimage, the statues were opened to the public for one month in 2009. This was the first time they had been opened to the public in 61 years, since 1948.

== Images of the temple ==
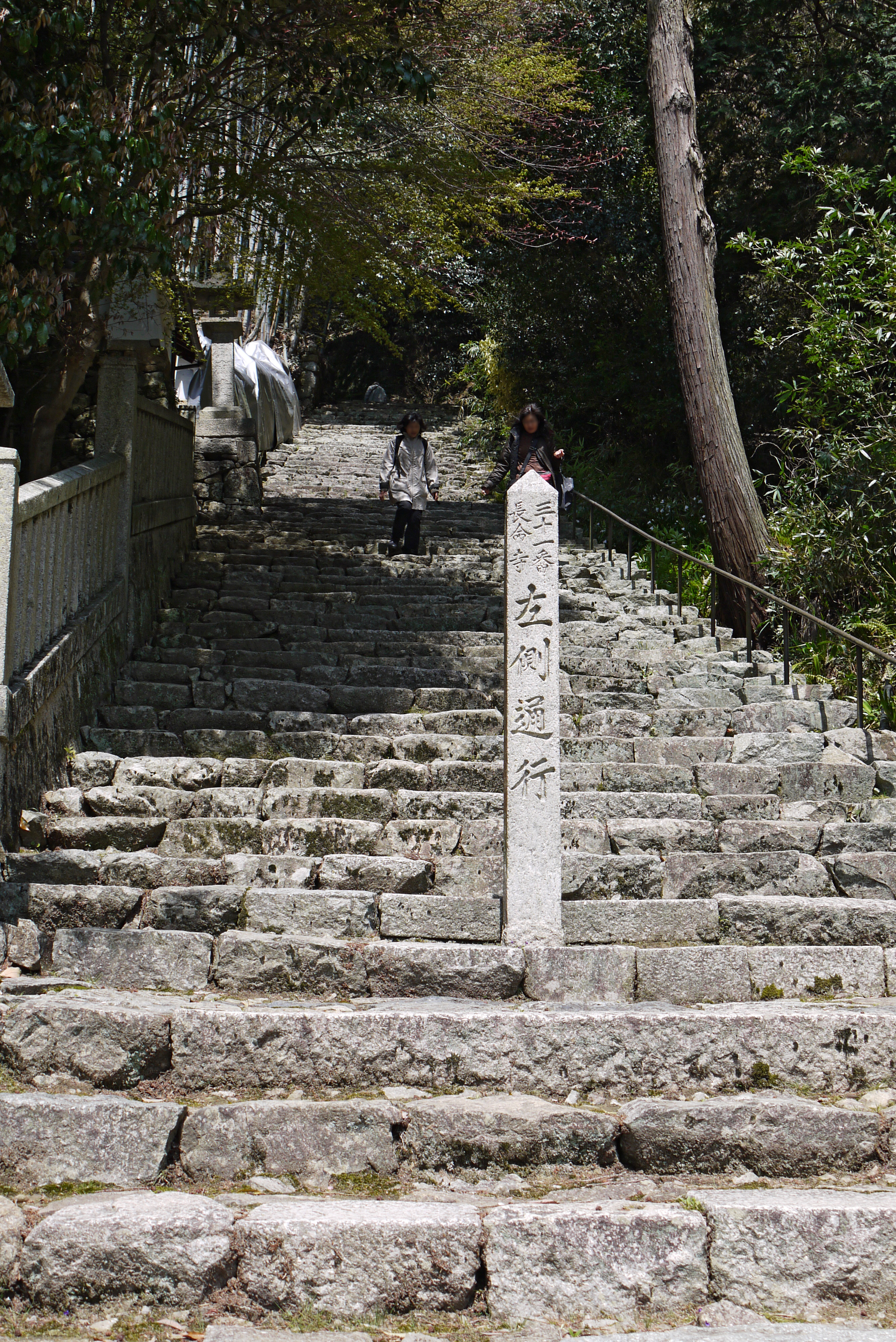
808 steps to the Sanmon

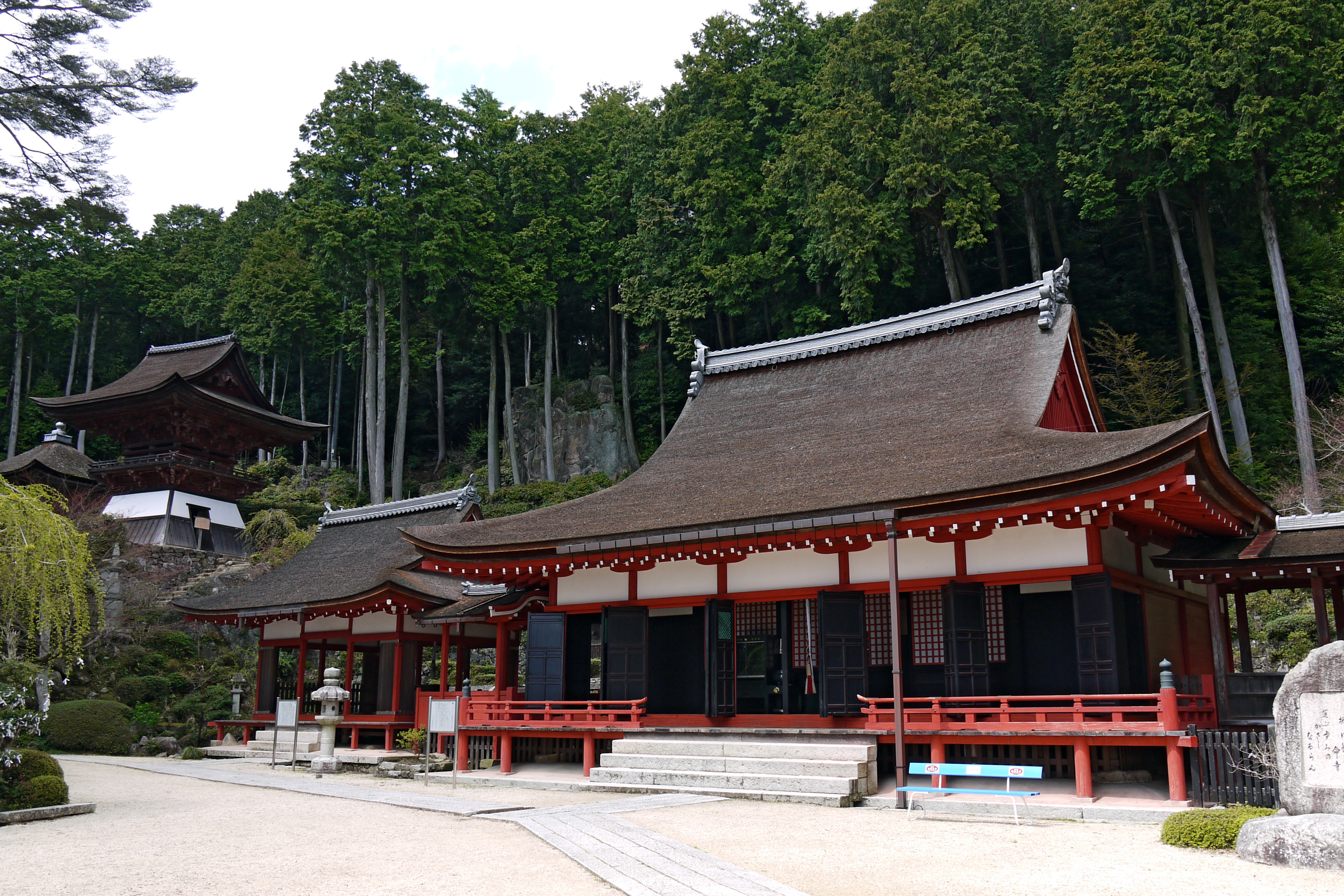
Sanbutsu-dō

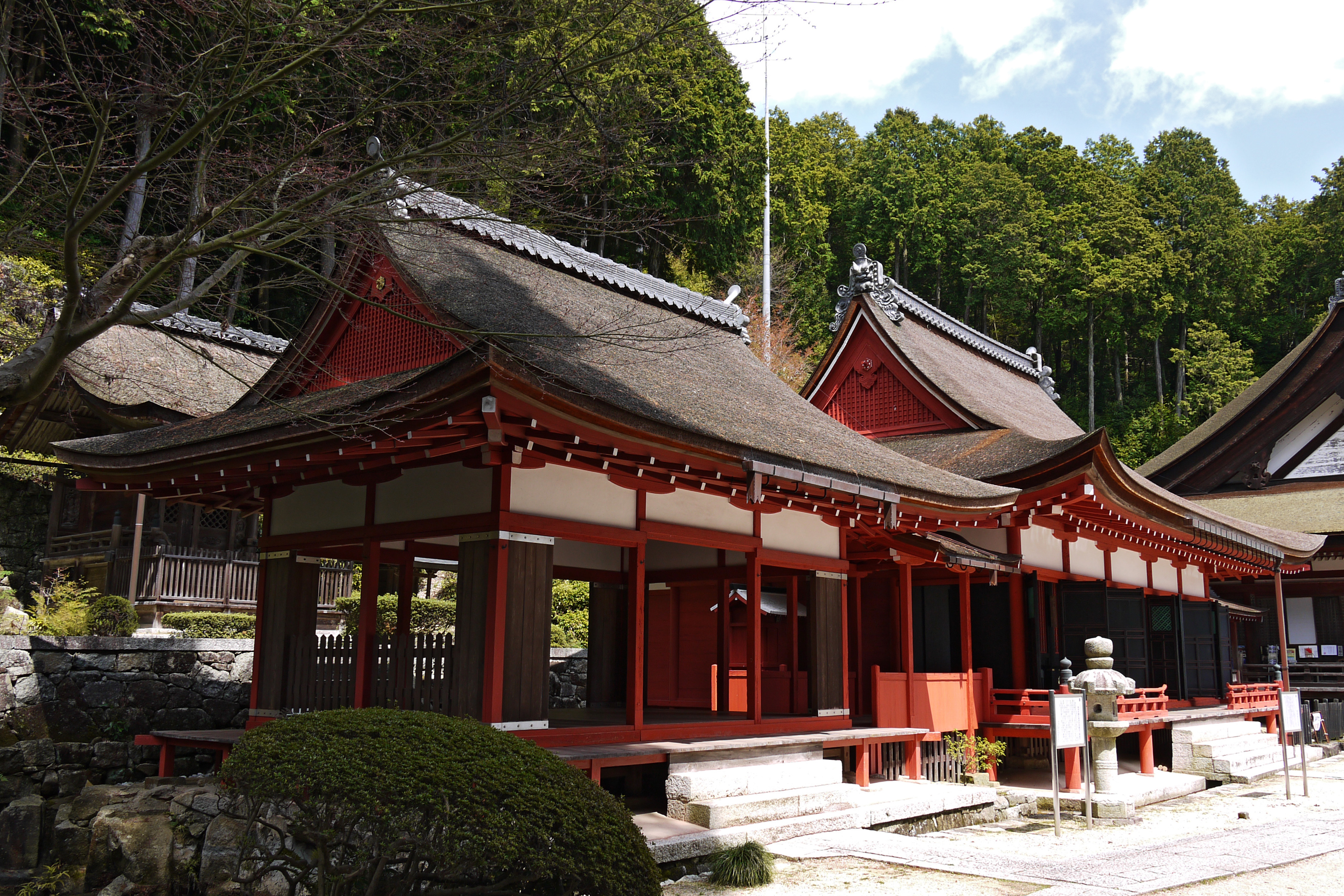
Gongen-sha Haiden

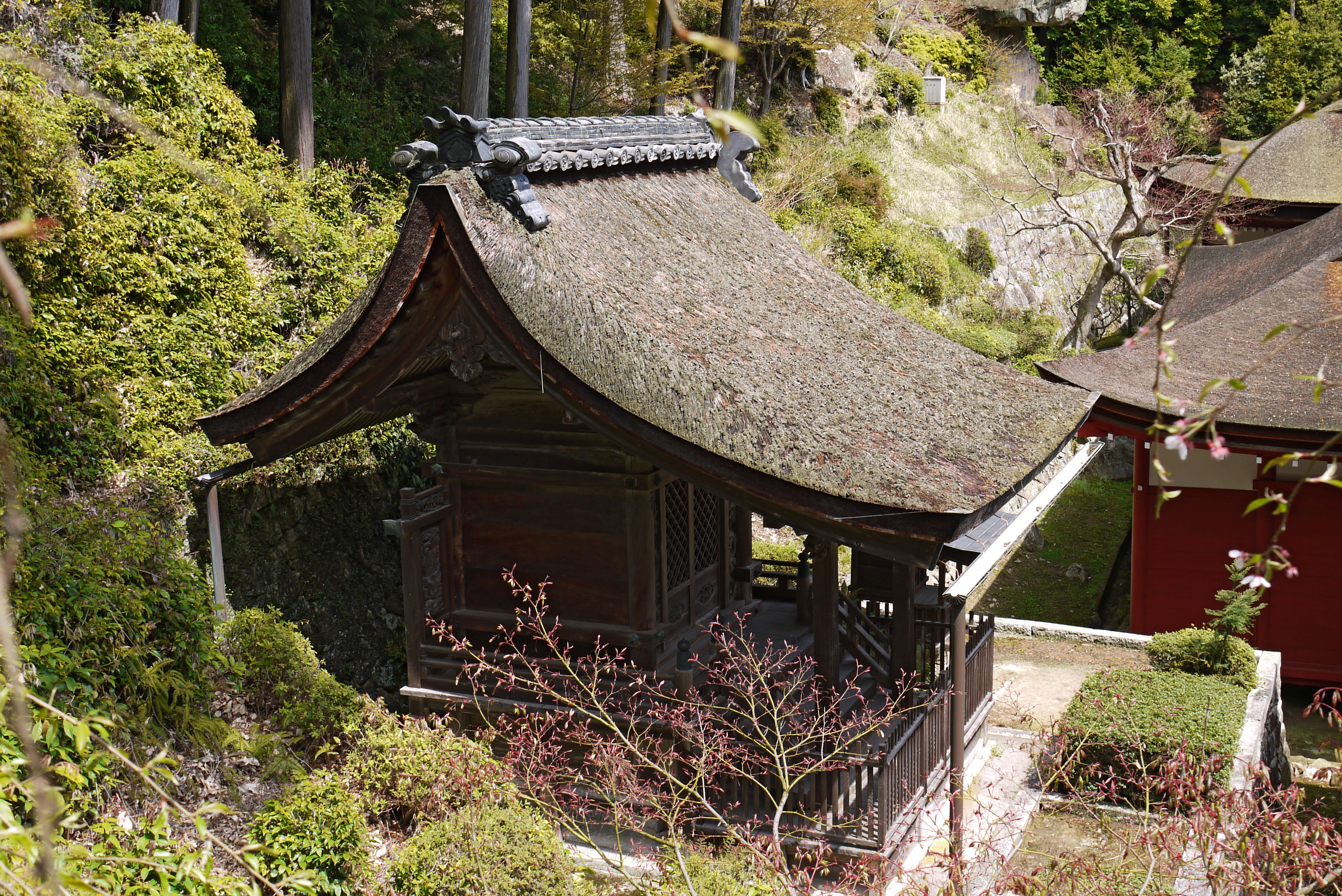
Gongen-sha Honden

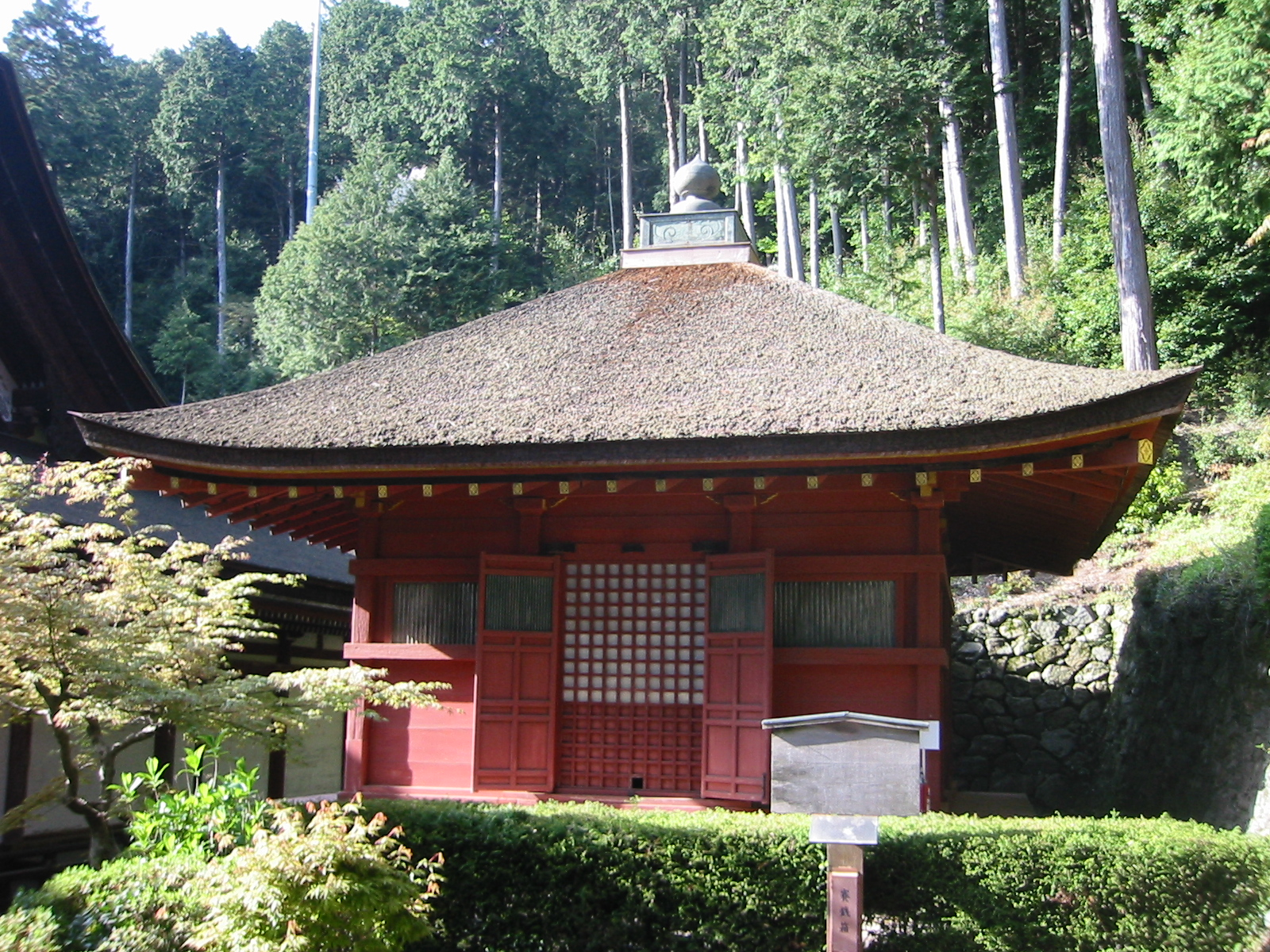
Goma-dō

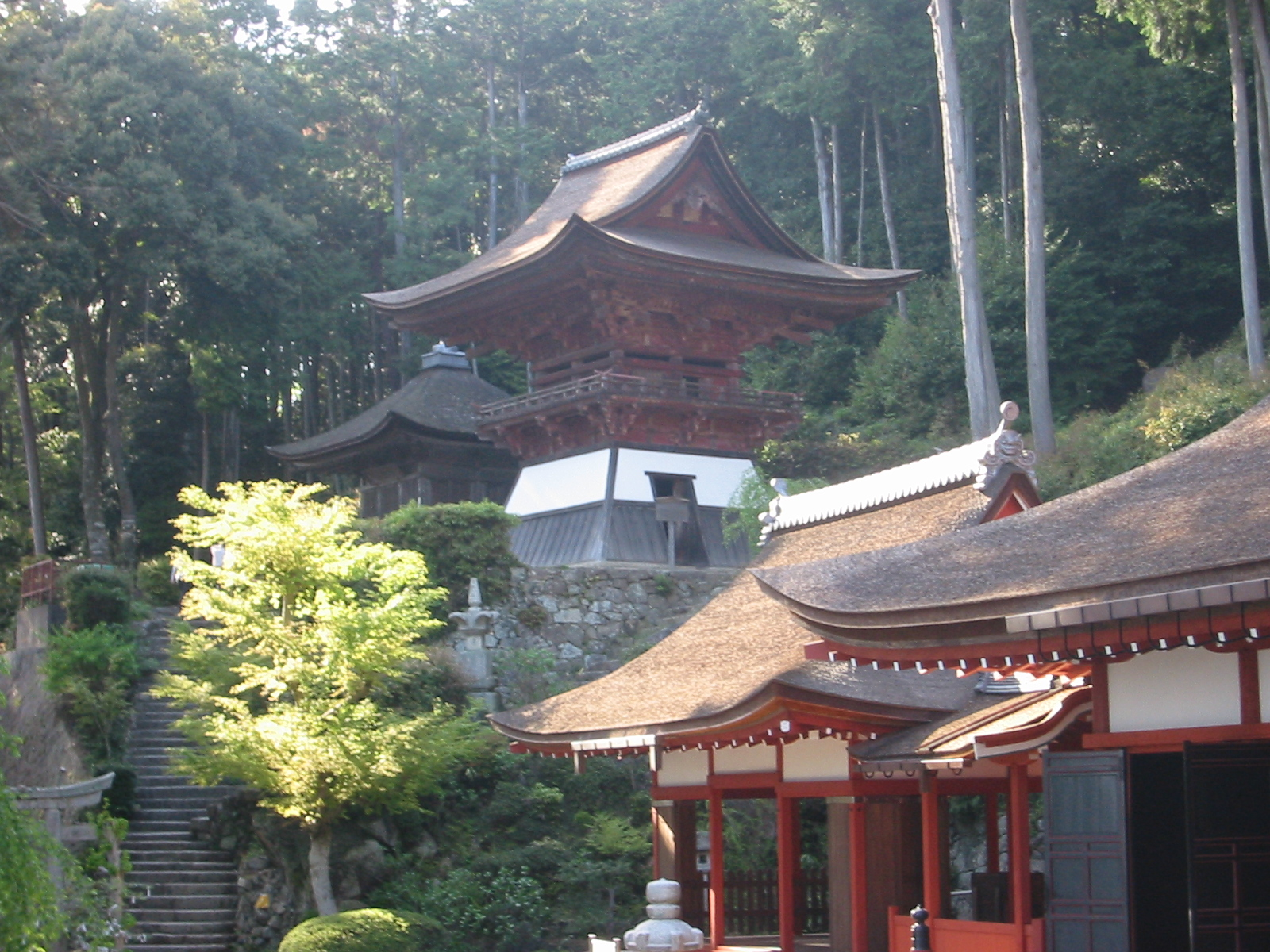
Shōrō

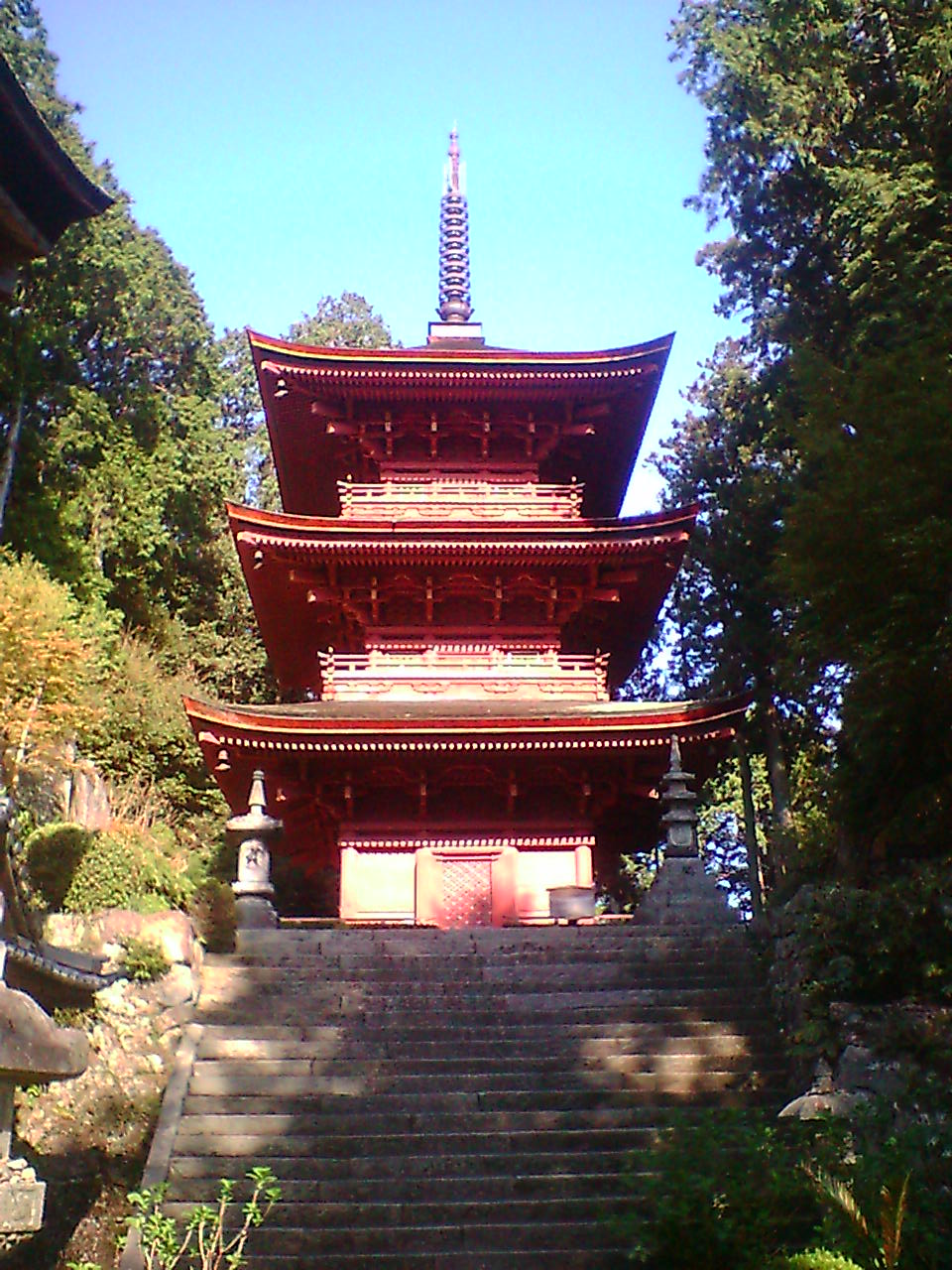
Three-story Pagoda

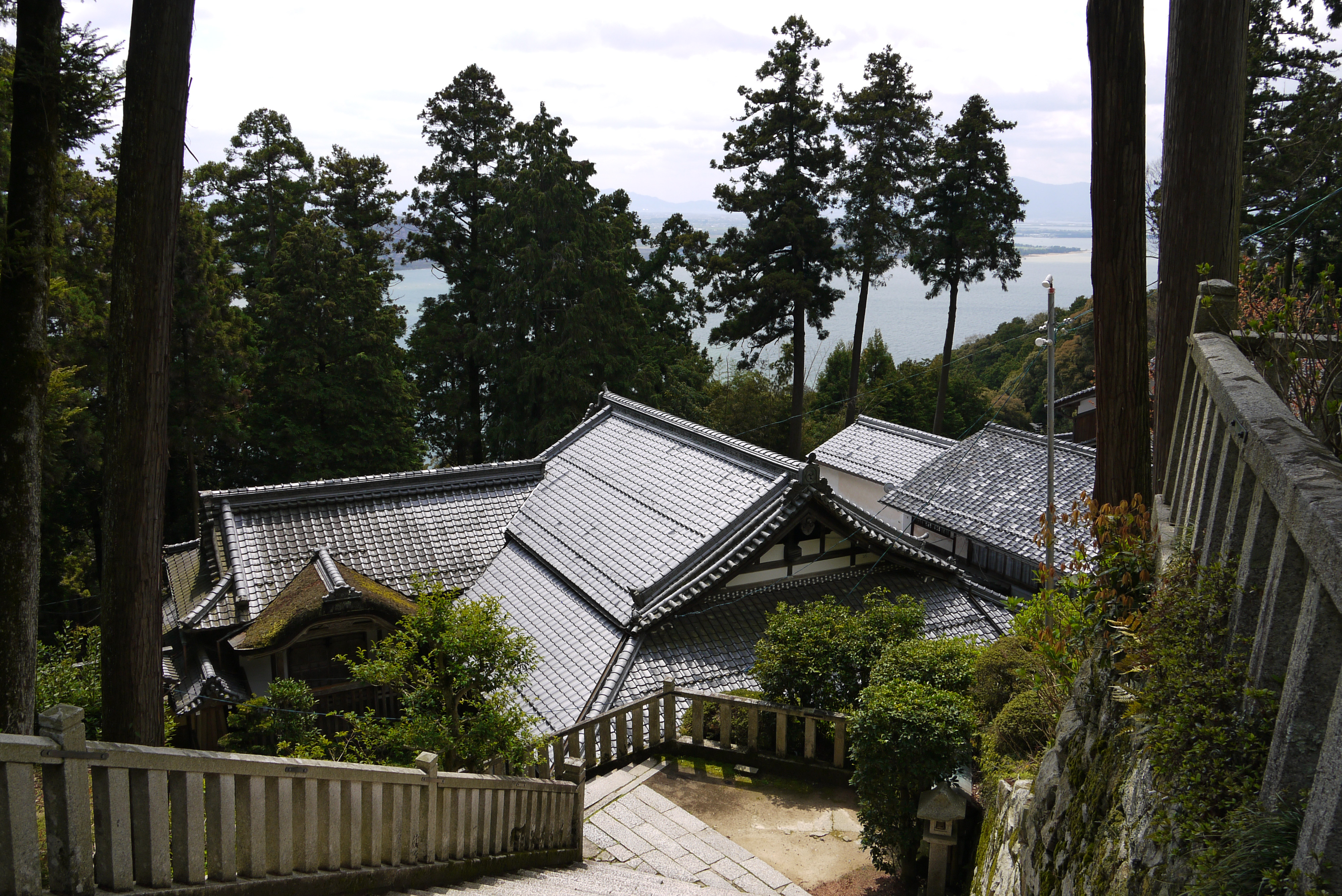
Kuri, overlooking Lake Biwa

== Access ==
The temple is located approximately 12 kilometers by car west of Azuchi Station on the JR West Biwako Line.

== Cultural Properties ==
=== National Important Cultural Properties ===
- Hondō (本堂), Muromachi period (1524)
- Sanbutsu-dō (三仏堂). Tenshō period (1573-1592).
- Gongen-dō Haiden (三仏堂). Muromachi period (1563).
- Goma-dō (護摩堂), Edo period (1606)
- Three-story Pagoda (三重塔), Sengoku period (1597).
- Wooden statue of standing Senjū Kannon (木造千手観音立像), Kamakura period
- Wooden statue of standing Jizō Bosatsu (木造地蔵菩薩立像), Kamakura period (1254); currently at Nara National Museum
- Wooden statue of standing Bishamon-ten (木造毘沙門天立像), Heian period
- Wooden statue of standing Shō-Kannon (木造聖観音立像), Kamakura period
- Wooden statue of standing Jūichimen Kannon (木造十一面観音立像), Heian period
- Colored silk painting of Amida Nyorai (絹本著色紅玻璃阿弥陀像), Nanboku-chō period
- Colored silk painting of Seishi Bosatsu (絹本著色勢至菩薩像), Southern Song Dynasty
- Colored silk painting of Shaka Sanzon (絹本著色釈迦三尊像), Muromachi period
- Colored silk painting of Nehan-zu (絹本著色涅槃像), Nanboku-chō period
- Gilt-bronze Openwork Garland (Keman) (金銅透彫華鬘), Kamakura period. (1243), set of 6. This gilt-bronze garland features a fan-shaped lotus arabesque design on both sides of a base plate. A central embossed horn with a sash-patterned, embossed design features a sash-patterned, embossed design. A circle with lotus-shaped seed figures (Jizo Bodhisattva) is riveted to the left and right sides. A ring surrounds the garland and is fastened with three or two rivets. Between the cords of the central horn, an embossed five-ring stupa with a seed figure (Shaka Nyorai) carved into the tower body is placed. Below it, a plaque with an inscription in kagoji (carved characters) on a nanako (fish-roe) background is riveted. The base plate is embossed with embossed lotus flowers, buds, and leaves. The circle features a silver-plated mirror panel with gilt-plated openwork seed figures and a gilt-plated ring. The hanging hardware is made of katsumagata uchidashi (a type of hammered metal), with a four-tiered base and a cut glass ring base with an eggplant-shaped ring.
- Shōrō (鐘堂), Edo period (1608)
- Chōmei-ji documents (長命寺文書), Heian to Meiji period. (4565 items).

=== Shiga Prefecture Tangible Cultural Properties ===
- Bonshō (梵鐘), Kamakura period (1243).
- Chōmei-ji documents (長命寺文書), Heian to Meiji period. (5,475 items).

=== Ōmihachiman City Designated Tangible Cultural Properties ===
- Wooden statues of standing Four Heavenly Kings (木造四天王立像), Kamakura period.
- Wooden statues of standing Dainichi Nyorai (木造大日如来坐像), Momoyama period.
- Colored silk painting of Amida Raigo (絹本著色山越阿弥陀像), Kamakura period.
- Colored silk painting of Miroku Bosatsu (絹本著色弥勒菩薩像), Kamakura period.
- Colored silk painting of Shaka triad (絹本著色釈迦三尊像), Kamakura period.
- Colored paper mandala of pilgrimage to Chōmyō-ji (紙本著色長命寺参詣曼荼羅), Edo period.
- Black lacquered chime stand (黒漆磬架), Nanboku-chō period.
- Printed version of the Great Perfection of Wisdom Sutra (版本大般若経), Kamakura period.
