= Three Great Shrines of Benzaiten =

The Three Great Shrines of Benzaiten (日本三大弁天) are a group of Japanese shrines dedicated to the worship of the goddess Benzaiten. During the Meiji Era separation of Shinto and Buddhism the veneration of the Buddhist water-goddess Benzaiten was replaced by the veneration of the Munakata sanjojin (宗像三女神), three Shinto goddesses of the sea. The official veneration of Benzaiten was moved to separate Buddhist temples. They are enumerated as follows:

- Daigan-ji Temple / Itsukushima Shrine, Hiroshima Prefecture
- Enoshima Shrine, Kanagawa Prefecture
- Hōgon-ji Temple / Tsukubusuma Shrine, Shiga Prefecture
