= Tsukubusuma Shrine =

Shinto shrine in Shiga Prefecture, Japan

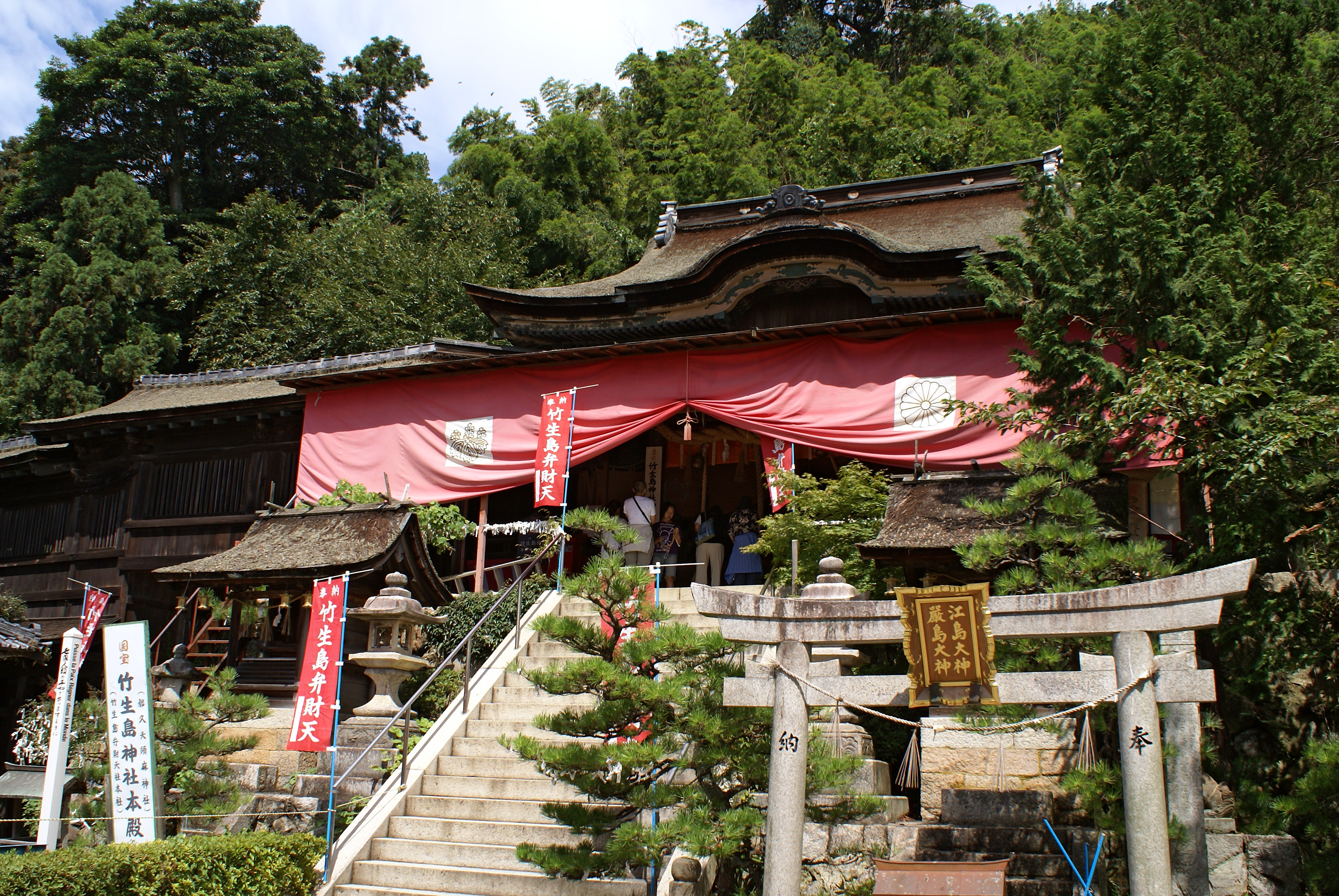
- Main shrine of Tsukubusuma Shrine, designated as a National Treasure.

- Location within Japan

Religion
- Affiliation: Shinto

Location
- Interactive map of Tsukubusuma Shrine
- Coordinates: 35°25′15″N 136°08′39″E

Tsukubusuma Shrine (都久夫須麻神社, Tsukubusuma Jinja) is a Shinto shrine on Chikubu Island in Shiga Prefecture, Japan. Its main hall (本殿, honden) is a National Treasure of Japan. The shrine's main festival is held annually on June 15. It is also called Chikubushima Shrine (竹生島神社, Chikubushima Jinja).

== See also ==
- List of National Treasures of Japan (shrines)
