= Chikubushima =

竹生島
- English title: Chikubu Island
- Written by: unknown
- Category: 1st — kami mono
- Characters: waki official wakizure two companions maeshite old man maetsure young woman aikyogen shrine attendant nochishite dragon-god nochitsure Benzaiten
- Place: Chikubu-shima, Lake Biwa
- Time: 10th century
- Schools: all

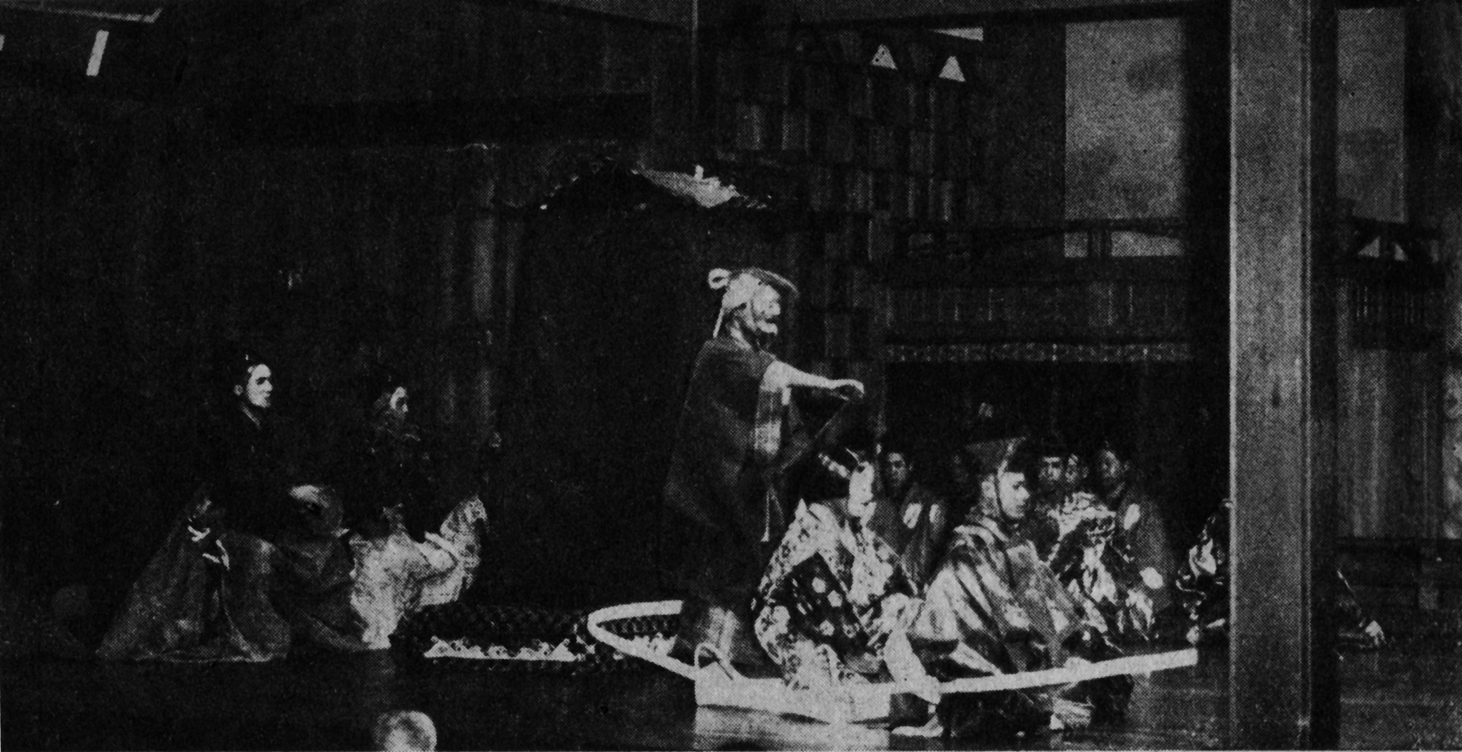
Chikubushima, Sakurama Kintaro II（櫻間金太郎）

Chikubushima is an anonymous Noh play of the first category, celebrating the sacred volcanic island of that name in Lake Biwa.

== Plot ==
During the reign of Emperor Daigo, a courtier goes to the island in the center of Lake Biwa: Chikubu Island.

When he arrives at the lake shore, an old fisherman and a young woman are setting out in a fishing boat. He calls out and asks if he can go with them. After the boat arrives at Chikubu Island the old man gives the courtier directions to the shrine. As the young woman is going the same way, the courtier asks if there is a prohibition against women (like many other shrines). The old man and young woman reply that, as Benzaiten (Sarasvati) is a woman herself, she does not discriminate.

They tell the tale of the formation of Chikubu Island's shrine. It becomes apparent that these two are not human. The old man dives into the ocean and the young woman disappears behind a door into the shrine. After a short while, Benzaiten appears and dances. Before long, the Dragon King of the Sea also appears and dances. Afterwards, Benzaiten returns to her shrine and the Dragon King returns to the waters.
