= Enoshima Shrine =

Shrine in Fujisawa, Kanagawa Prefecture, Japan

Enoshima Jinja 江島神社
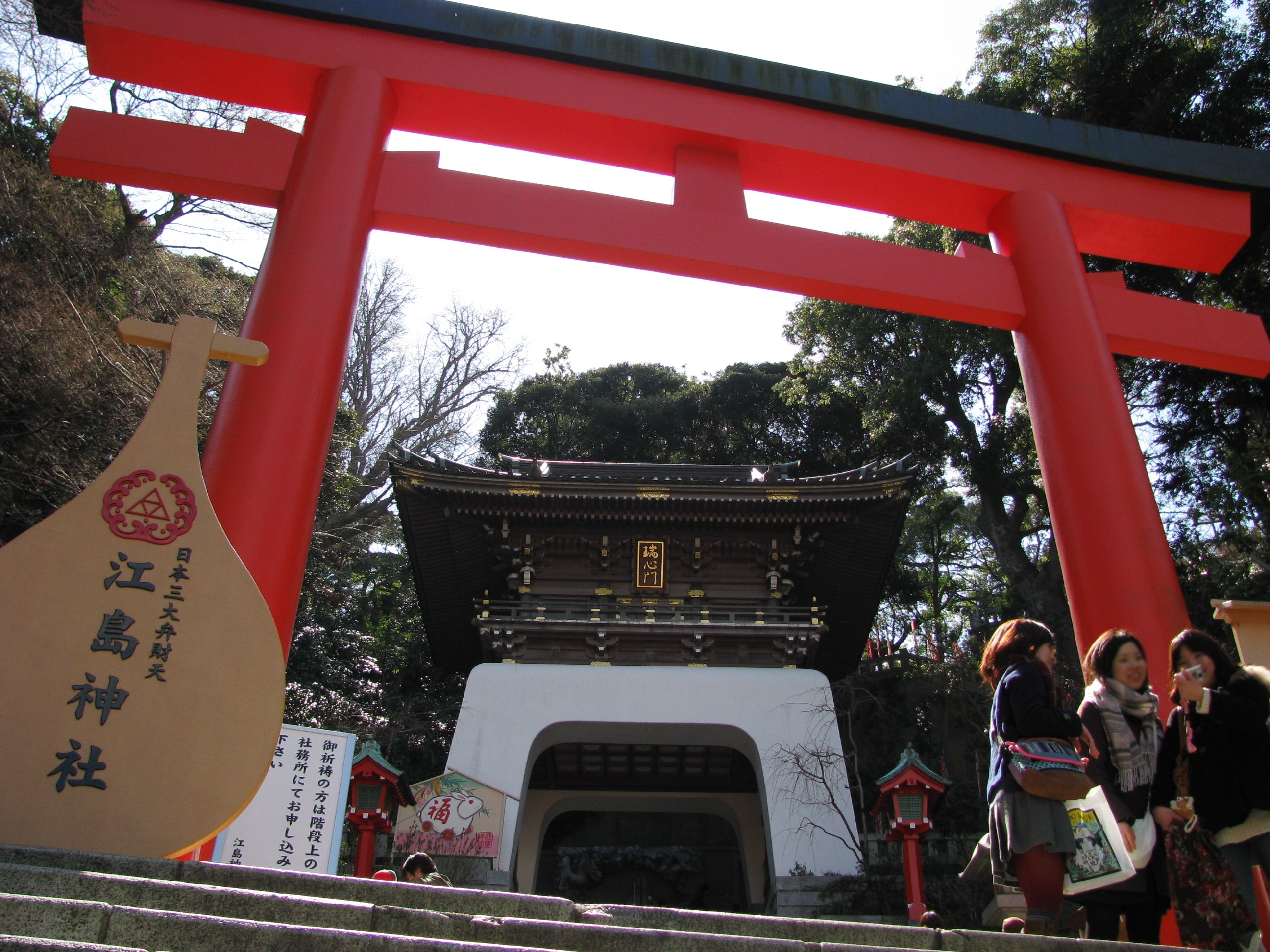
- Zuishinmon

- Location within Japan

Religion
- Affiliation: Shinto
- Deity: Munakata goddesses, Benzaiten

Location
- Location: 2-3-8, Enoshima, Fujisawa-shi, Kanagawa prefecture, Japan
- Coordinates: 35°18′02″N 139°28′47″E

Architecture
- Established: 552

Website
- www.enoshimajinja.or.jp/index.html

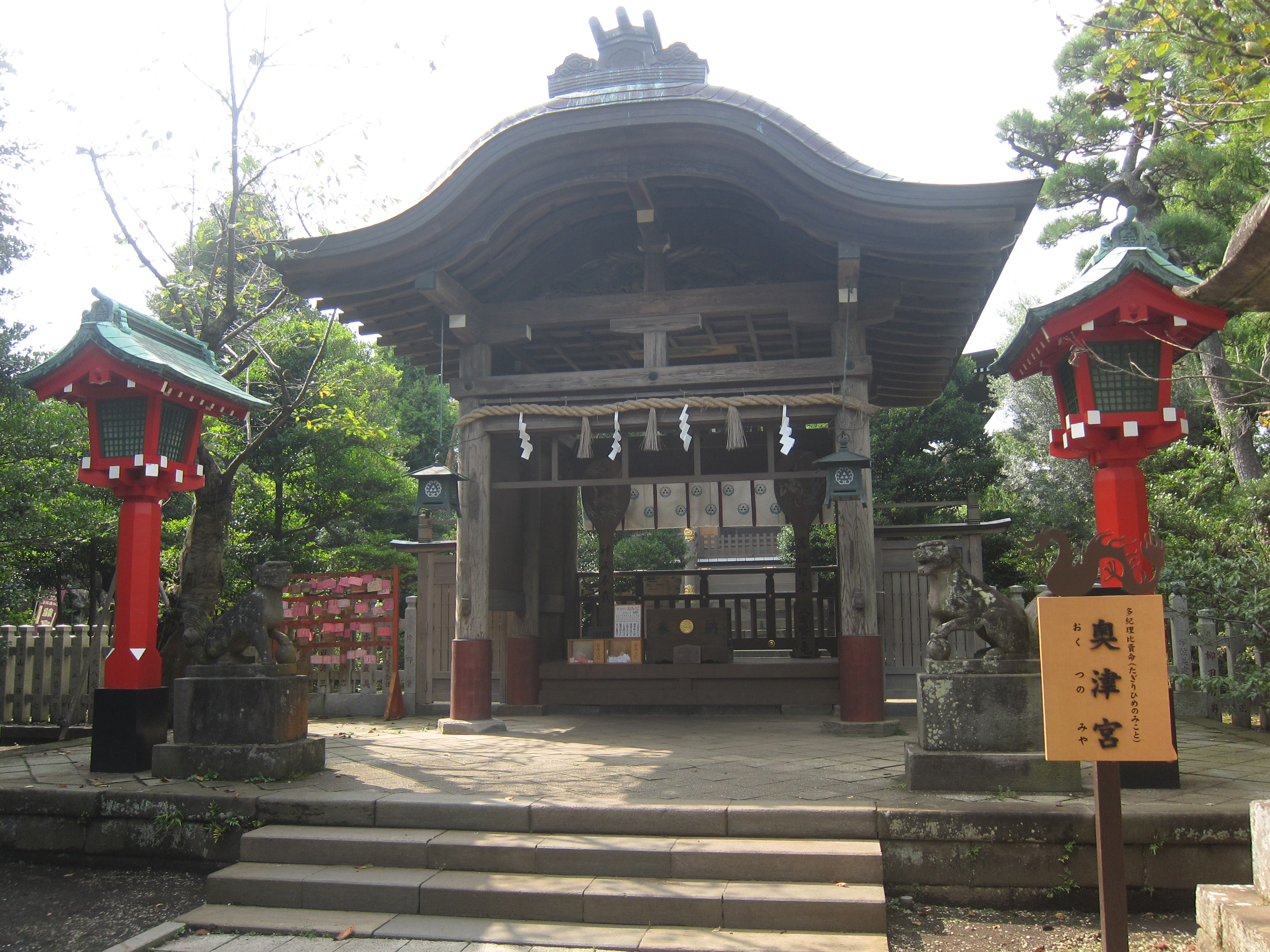
Oku-tsu-miya (奧津宮)

Enoshima Shrine (江島神社) is a Shinto shrine in Enoshima, Fujisawa, Kanagawa, Japan. The shrine is dedicated to the worship of the kami Benten. Enoshima-jinja comprises three shrines, He-tsu-miya, Naka-tsu-miya and Oku-tsu-miya.

According to legend, 12th-century Japanese ruler Hōjō Tokimasa visited the shrine to pray for prosperity, and there heard a prophecy from a mysterious woman, who left behind three scales, which became his family crest.

== See also ==
- Three Great Shrines of Benzaiten
