= Shiga Station =

Railway station in Ōtsu, Shiga Prefecture, Japan

Shiga Station 志賀駅
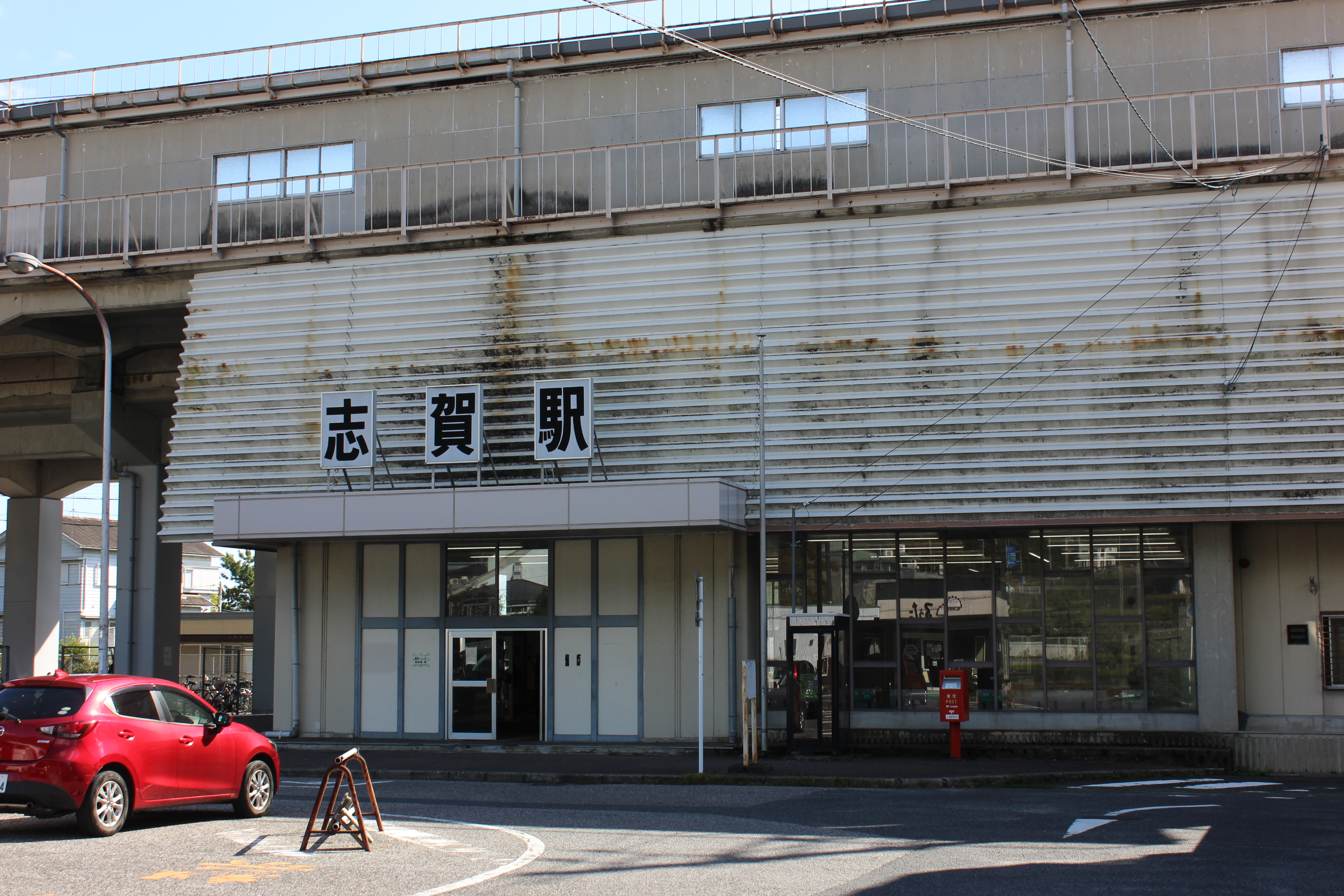
- Shiga Station, October 2020

General information
- Location: Kido, Ōtsu-shi, Shiga-ken 520-0514; Japan
- Coordinates: 35.2024°N 135.9248°E
- Operator: JR West
- Line: Kosei Line
- Distance: 27.3 km from Yamashina
- Platforms: 2 side platforms
- Tracks: 2

Construction
- Structure type: Elevated
- Accessible: None

Other information
- Station code: JR-B21
- Website: Official website

History
- Opened: 20 July 1974

Passengers
- FY 2023: 1,760 daily

Services
Preceding station	JR West	Following station
Horai towards Kyoto	Kosei Line Local	Hira towards Tsuruga
Location
- Location within Shiga Prefecture Location within Japan

Shiga Station (志賀駅, Shiga-eki) is a passenger railway station located in the city of Ōtsu, Shiga Prefecture, Japan, operated by the West Japan Railway Company (JR West).

== Lines ==
Shiga Station is served by the Kosei Line, and is 27.3 kilometres (17.0 miles) from the starting point of the line at Yamashina and 32.8 kilometres (20.4 miles) from Kyoto.

== Station layout ==
The station consists of two opposed elevated side platforms with the station building underneath. The station is staffed.

== Platforms ==
1	■ Kosei Line	for Ōmi-Imazu and Tsuruga
2	■ Kosei Line	for Katata and Kyoto

== History ==
The station opened on 20 July 1974 as a station on the Japan National Railway (JNR). The station became part of the West Japan Railway Company on 1 April 1987 due to the privatization and dissolution of the JNR.

Station numbering was introduced in March 2018 with Shiga being assigned station number JR-B21.

== Passenger statistics ==
In fiscal 2019, the station was used by an average of 1063 passengers daily (boarding passengers only).

== Surrounding area ==
- former Shiga Town Hall
- Otsu City Kido Elementary School
- Otsu City Shigakita Kindergarten

== See also ==
- List of railway stations in Japan
