= Wani Station =

Railway station in Ōtsu, Shiga Prefecture, Japan

Wani Station 和邇駅
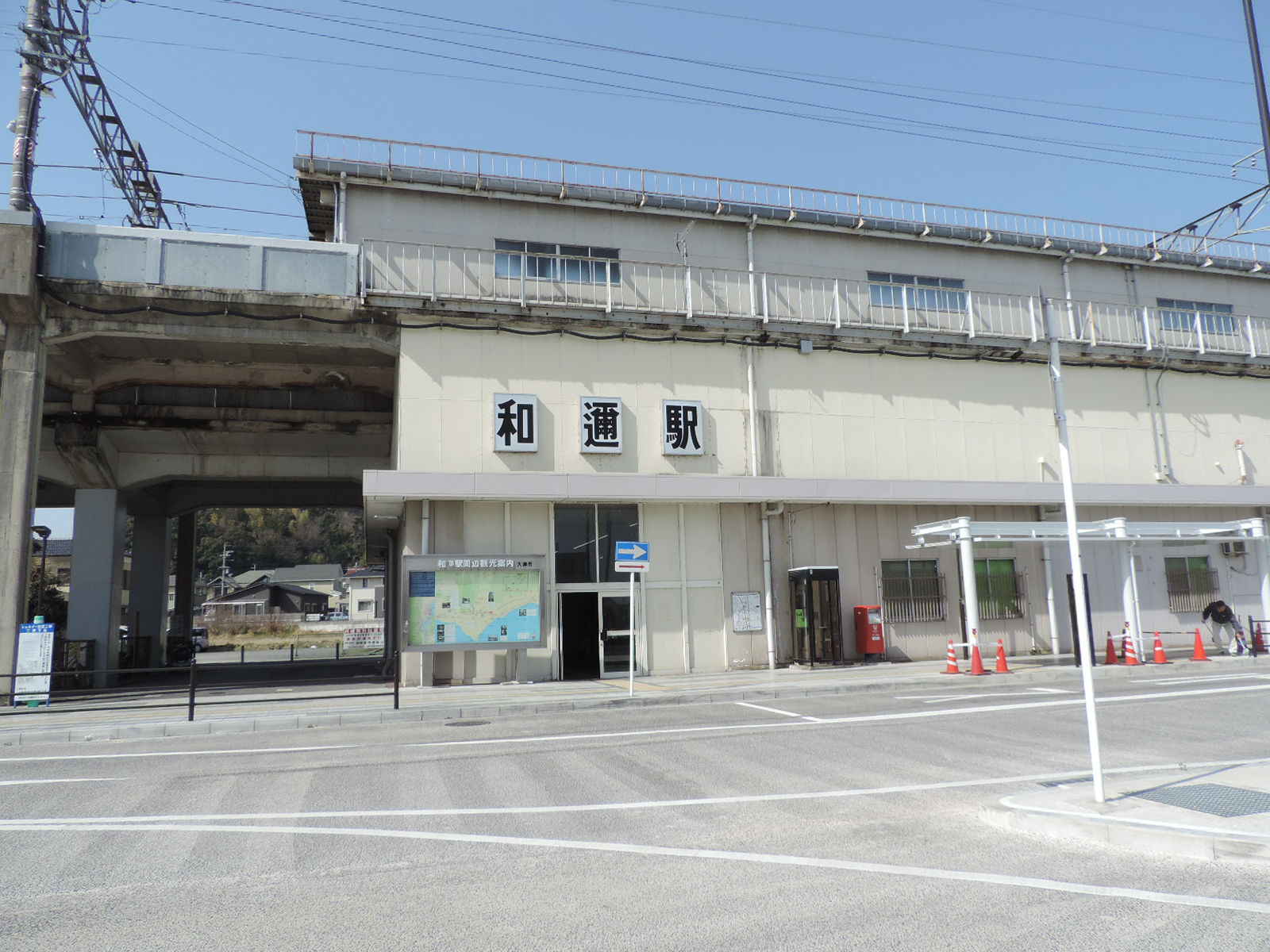
- Wani Station east entrance, March 2020

General information
- Location: 448 Waninakahama, Ōtsu-shi, Shiga-ken 520-0522; Japan
- Coordinates: 35.1613°N 135.9221°E
- Operator: JR West
- Line: Kosei Line
- Distance: 22.5 km from Yamashina
- Platforms: 2 side platforms
- Tracks: 2

Construction
- Structure type: Elevated
- Accessible: Yes

Other information
- Station code: JR-B23
- Website: Official website

History
- Opened: 20 July 1974

Passengers
- FY 2023: 3,894 daily

Services
Preceding station	JR West	Following station
Ono towards Kyoto	Kosei Line Local	Horai towards Tsuruga
Location
- Location within Shiga Prefecture Location within Japan

Wani Station (和邇駅, Wani-eki) is a passenger railway station located in the city of Ōtsu, Shiga Prefecture, Japan, operated by the West Japan Railway Company (JR West).

== Lines ==
Wani Station is served by the Kosei Line, and is 22.5 kilometres (14.0 miles) from the starting point of the line at Yamashina and 28.0 kilometres (17.4 miles) from Kyoto.

== Station layout ==
The station consists of two opposed elevated side platforms with the station building underneath. The station is staffed.

== Platforms ==
1	■ Kosei Line	for Ōmi-Imazu and Tsuruga
2	■ Kosei Line	for Katata and Kyoto

== History ==
The station opened on 20 July 1974 as a station on the Japan National Railway (JNR). The station became part of the West Japan Railway Company on 1 April 1987 due to the privatization and dissolution of the JNR.

Station numbering was introduced in March 2018 with Tsuda being assigned station number JR-B23.

== Passenger statistics ==
In fiscal 2019, the station was used by an average of 2329 passengers daily (boarding passengers only).

== Surrounding area ==
- Otsu Municipal Wanabe Library
- Wani Gymnasium
- Wani Post Office
- Otsu Red Cross Shiga Hospital
- Wani Elementary School, Otsu City

== See also ==
- List of railway stations in Japan
