= Hōrai Station =

Railway station in Ōtsu, Shiga Prefecture, Japan

Hōrai Station 蓬萊駅
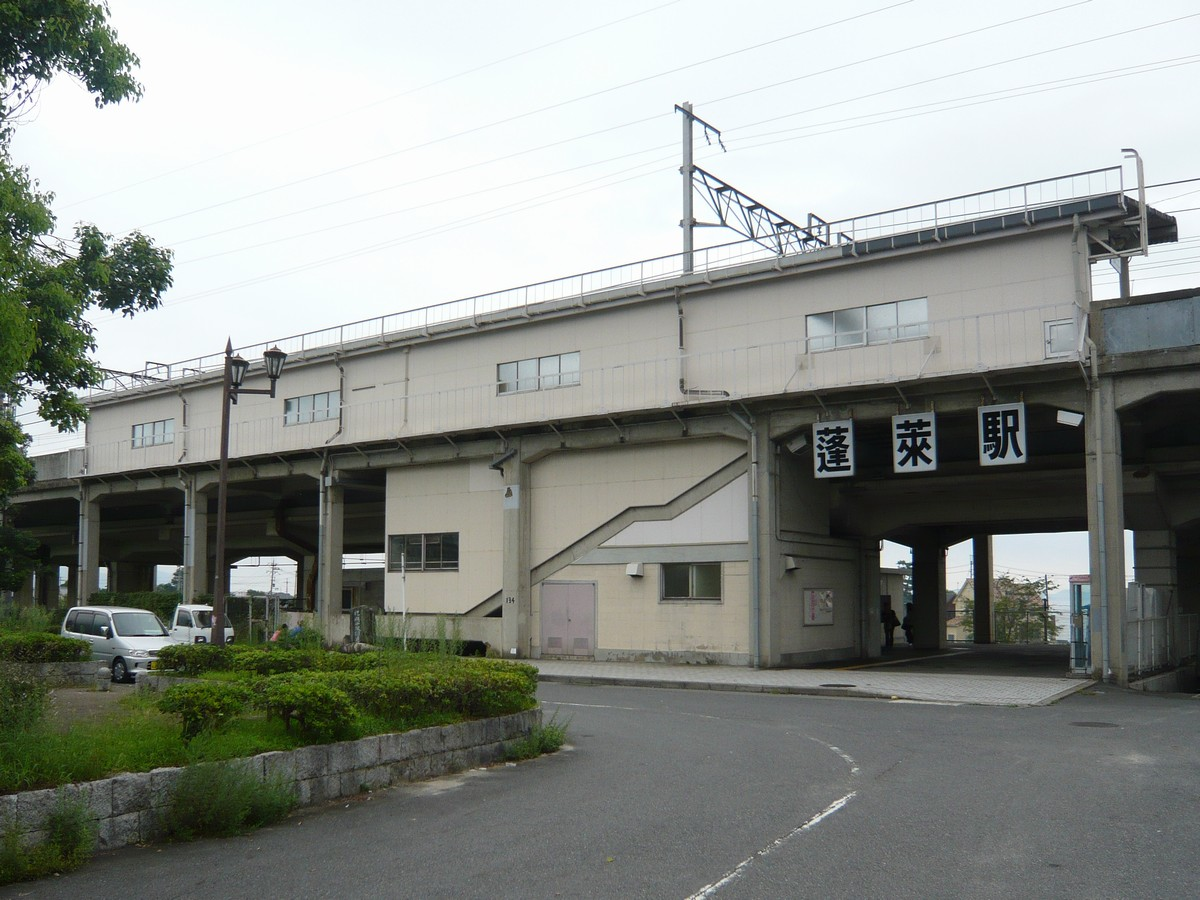
- Hōrai Station, August 2007

General information
- Location: Hachiyado, Ōtsu-shi, Shiga-ken 520-0515; Japan
- Coordinates: 35.1824°N 135.9153°E
- Operator: JR West
- Line: Kosei Line
- Distance: 24.9 km from Yamashina
- Platforms: 2 side platforms
- Tracks: 2

Construction
- Structure type: Elevated
- Accessible: None

Other information
- Station code: JR-B22
- Website: Official website

History
- Opened: 20 July 1974

Passengers
- FY 2023: 1,692 daily

Services
Preceding station	JR West	Following station
Wani towards Kyoto	Kosei Line Local	Shiga towards Tsuruga
Location
- Location within Shiga Prefecture Location within Japan

Hōrai Station (蓬萊駅, Hōrai-eki) is a passenger railway station located in the city of Ōtsu, Shiga Prefecture, Japan, operated by the West Japan Railway Company (JR West).

== Lines ==
Hōrai Station is served by the Kosei Line, and is 24.9 kilometres (15.5 miles) from the starting point of the line at Yamashina and 30.4 kilometres (18.9 miles) from Kyoto.

== Station layout ==
The station consists of two opposed elevated side platforms with the station building underneath. The station is staffed.

== Platforms ==
1	■ Kosei Line	for Ōmi-Imazu and Tsuruga
2	■ Kosei Line	for Katata and Kyoto

== History ==
The station opened on 20 July 1974 as a station on the Japan National Railway (JNR). The station became part of the West Japan Railway Company on 1 April 1987 due to the privatization and dissolution of the JNR.

Station numbering was introduced in March 2018 with Hōrai being assigned station number JR-B22.

== Passenger statistics ==
In fiscal 2019, the station was used by an average of 1029 passengers daily (boarding passengers only).

== Surrounding area ==
- Hachisho Shrine
- Otsu City Shiga Junior High School
- Horaihama Swimming Pool
- BSC Water Sports Center

== See also ==
- List of railway stations in Japan
