= Ono Station (Shiga) =

Railway station in Ōtsu, Shiga Prefecture, Japan

Ono Station 小野駅
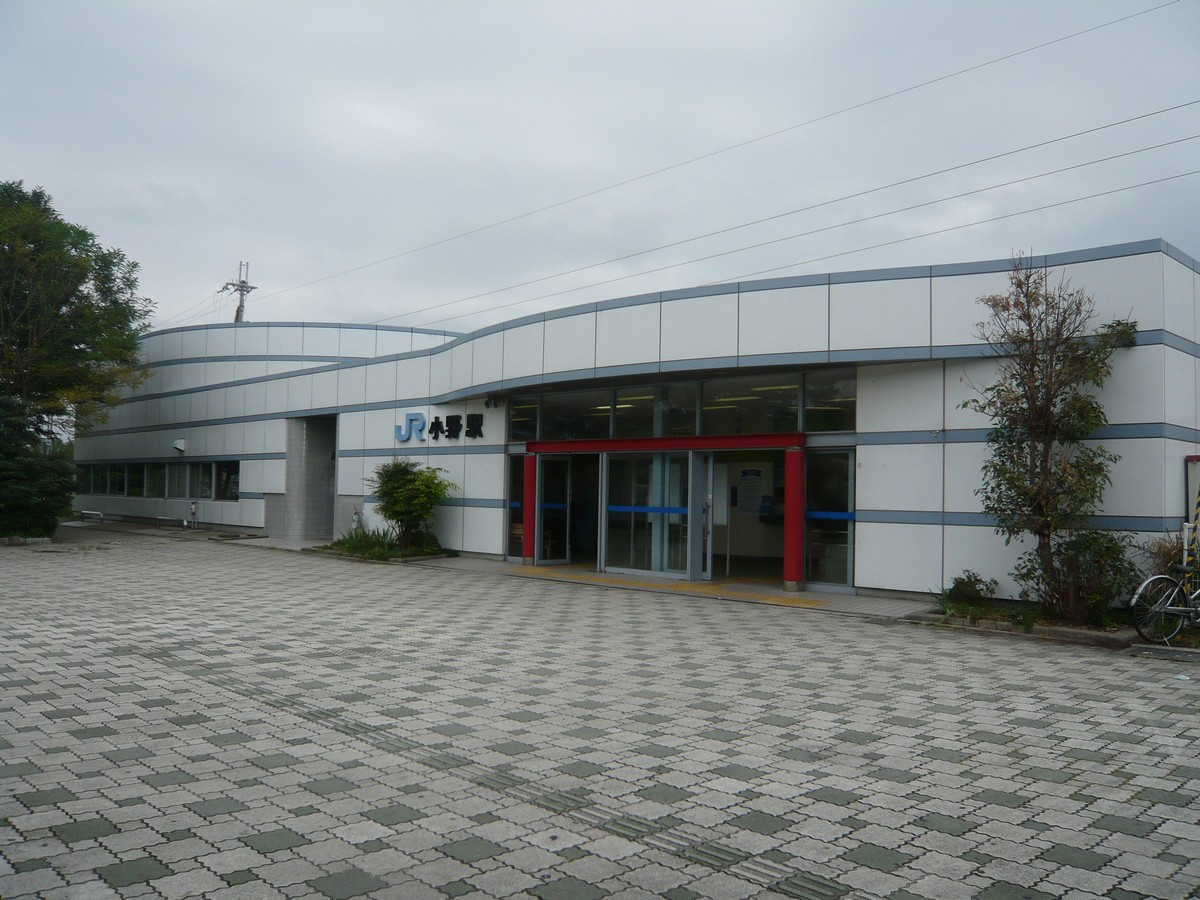
- Ono Station, August 2007

General information
- Location: 1-4-4 Kosei, Ōtsu-shi, Shiga-ken 520-0532; Japan
- Coordinates: 35°08′20″N 135°55′21″E
- Operator: JR West
- Line: Kosei Line
- Distance: 19.8 km from Yamashina
- Platforms: 2 side platforms
- Tracks: 2
- Connections: Bus terminal

Construction
- Structure type: Ground level
- Accessible: Yes

Other information
- Station code: JR-B24
- Website: Official website

History
- Opened: 4 December 1988

Passengers
- FY 2023: 4,876 daily

Services
Preceding station	JR West	Following station
Katata towards Kyoto	Kosei Line Local	Wani towards Tsuruga
Location
- Location within Shiga Prefecture Location within Japan

Ono Station (小野駅, Ono-eki) is a passenger railway station located in the city of Ōtsu, Shiga Prefecture, Japan, operated by the West Japan Railway Company (JR West).

== Lines ==
Ono Station is served by the Kosei Line, and is 19.8 kilometres (12.3 miles) from the starting point of the line at Yamashina and 25.3 kilometres (15.7 miles) from Kyoto.

== Station layout ==
The station consists of two opposed elevated side platforms with the station building underneath. The station is staffed.

== Platforms ==
1	■ Kosei Line	for Ōmi-Imazu and Tsuruga
2	■ Kosei Line	for Katata and Kyoto

== History ==
The station opened on 4 December 1988. The construction cost of the station was provided by Keihan Electric Railway, who developed the "Biwako Rose Town" residential area near the station. This is the only infill station that was added since the opening of the Kosei Line in 1974.

Station numbering was introduced in March 2018 with Ono being assigned station number JR-B24.

== Passenger statistics ==
In fiscal 2019, the station was used by an average of 2901 passengers daily (boarding passengers only).

== Surrounding area ==
- Otsu City Ono City Center
- Shiga Prefectural Road 558 Takashima Otsu Line
- Onoimoko Park

== See also ==
- List of railway stations in Japan
