= Raichō =

Japanese train service

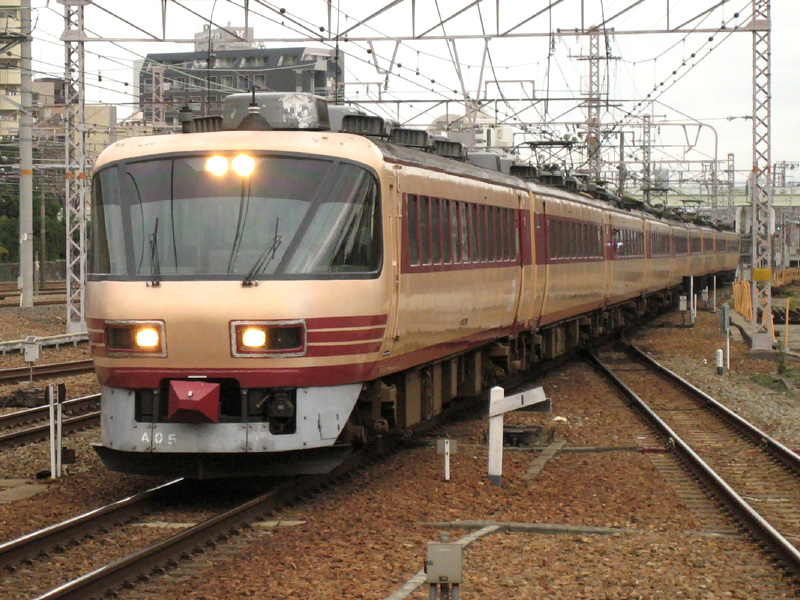
- 485 series Raichō train with panorama cab car, December 2006

Overview
- Service type: Limited express
- First service: 1964
- Last service: 2011
- Former operator(s): JR West

Route
- Line(s) used: Tokaido Line (JR Kyoto Line), Kosei Line, Hokuriku Line

Technical
- Rolling stock: 485 series

The Raichō (雷鳥) was a limited express train operated by the West Japan Railway Company (JR West) between Osaka and Kanazawa in Japan until March 2011, using portions of the Tōkaidō Main Line, Kosei Line, and Hokuriku Main Line.

The characters 雷 鳥 literally mean "thunder/lightning" and "bird" in Japanese, but the compound word 雷鳥 (raichō) is the name of Lagopus muta, the rock ptarmigan. The raichō bird inhabits the Tateyama Mountain Range and is the prefectural bird of Toyama, Nagano, and Gifu Prefectures.

== Station stops ==
Stations in parentheses were not served by all services.

Ōsaka - Shin-Ōsaka - Kyoto - (Katata: Raicho 8 only) - (Omi-Imazu: Raicho 33 only) - Tsuruga - Takefu - Sabae - Fukui - Awaraonsen - Kagaonsen - Komatsu - - Kanazawa

== Rolling stock ==
- 485 series EMUs

== Formation ==
- Green: Green car (first class)
- White: Standard class car
- O: Observation seats
- R: Reserved seats
- NR: Non-reserved seats
- No smoking accommodation
- 6 cars

← Osaka Kanazawa →
1	2	3	4	5	6
O, R	R	R	R	NR	NR

- Women-only seats are available in Car 3.

== History ==
The Raichō service was first introduced on 25 December 1964 as a limited express operating between Osaka and Toyama.

From 11 March 1989, Super Raichō services were introduced, operating between Kobe/Osaka and Toyama/Wakura Onsen.

From the start of the 20 April 1995 timetable revision, new 681 series EMUs were introduced on Osaka to Toyama services, named Super Raichō (Thunderbird). These became simply Thunderbird from March 1997.

JR West introduced a "women-only" section in the reserved-seating cars of Raichō and Thunderbird trains from October 2007 following the rape of a female passenger by a man in a train toilet while travelling on a Thunderbird service in August 2006.

The last remaining Raichō service was discontinued from the start of the 12 March 2011 timetable revision, with all trains subsequently using the Thunderbird name.
