= 比良駅 =

比良駅 is the name of multiple train stations in Japan:

- Bira Station
- Hira Station (disambiguation)
  - Hira Station (Aichi)
  - Hira Station (Shiga)
