= Hira Station (Shiga) =

Railway station in Ōtsu, Shiga Prefecture, Japan

Hira Station 比良駅
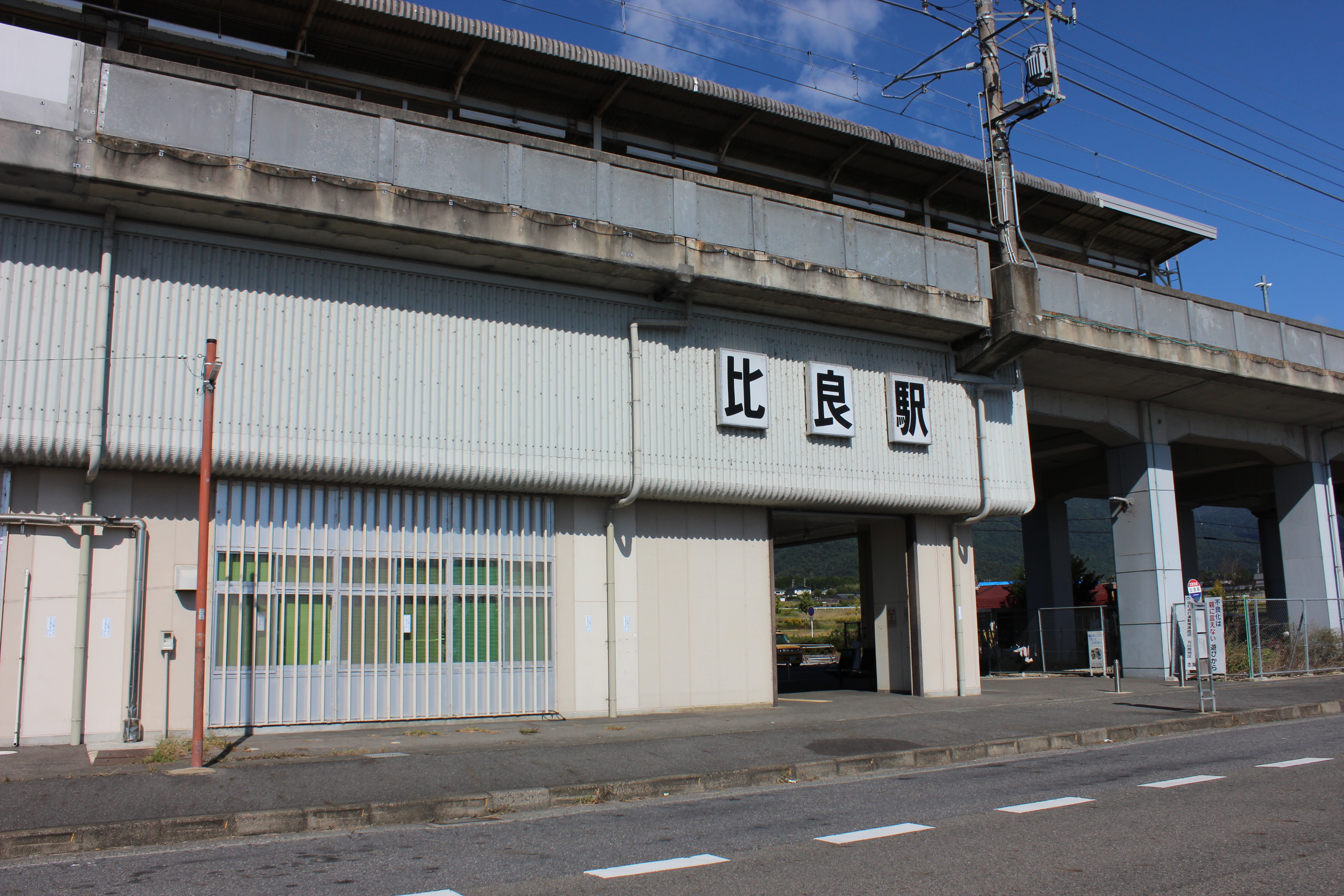
- Hira Station, October 2020

General information
- Location: Yamoto 281-5 Kita-Hira, Ōtsu-shi, Shiga-ken 520-0503; Japan
- Coordinates: 35°13′12″N 135°56′40″E
- Operator: JR West
- Line: Kosei Line
- Distance: 30.0 km from Yamashina
- Platforms: 2 side platforms
- Tracks: 2
- Connections: Bus terminal

Construction
- Structure type: Elevated
- Accessible: None

Other information
- Station code: JR-B20
- Website: Official website

History
- Opened: 20 July 1974

Passengers
- FY 2023: 2,848 daily

Services
Preceding station	JR West	Following station
Shiga towards Kyoto	Kosei Line Local	Omi-Maiko towards Tsuruga
Location
- Location within Shiga Prefecture Location within Japan

Hira Station (比良駅, Hira-eki) is a passenger railway station located in the city of Ōtsu, Shiga Prefecture, Japan, operated by the West Japan Railway Company (JR West).

== Lines ==
Hira Station is served by the Kosei Line, and is 30.0 kilometres (18.6 miles) from the starting point of the line at Yamashina and 35.5 kilometres (22.1 miles) from Kyoto.

== Station layout ==
The station consists of two opposed elevated side platforms with the station building underneath. The station is staffed.

== Platforms ==
1	■ Kosei Line	for Ōmi-Imazu and Tsuruga
2	■ Kosei Line	for Katata and Kyoto

== History ==
The station opened on 20 July 1974 as a station on the Japan National Railway (JNR). The station became part of the West Japan Railway Company on 1 April 1987 due to the privatization and dissolution of the JNR.

Station numbering was introduced in March 2018 with Hira being assigned station number JR-B20.

== Passenger statistics ==
In fiscal 2019, the station was used by an average of 1544 passengers daily (boarding passengers only).

== Surrounding area ==
- Japan National Route 161
- Hira Mountain Trailhead (Mt. Domandake, Mt. Shaka)
- Hira Mountain Ski Resort
- Biwako Seikei Sport College

== See also ==
- List of railway stations in Japan
