= Kosei Line =

Railway line in Japan

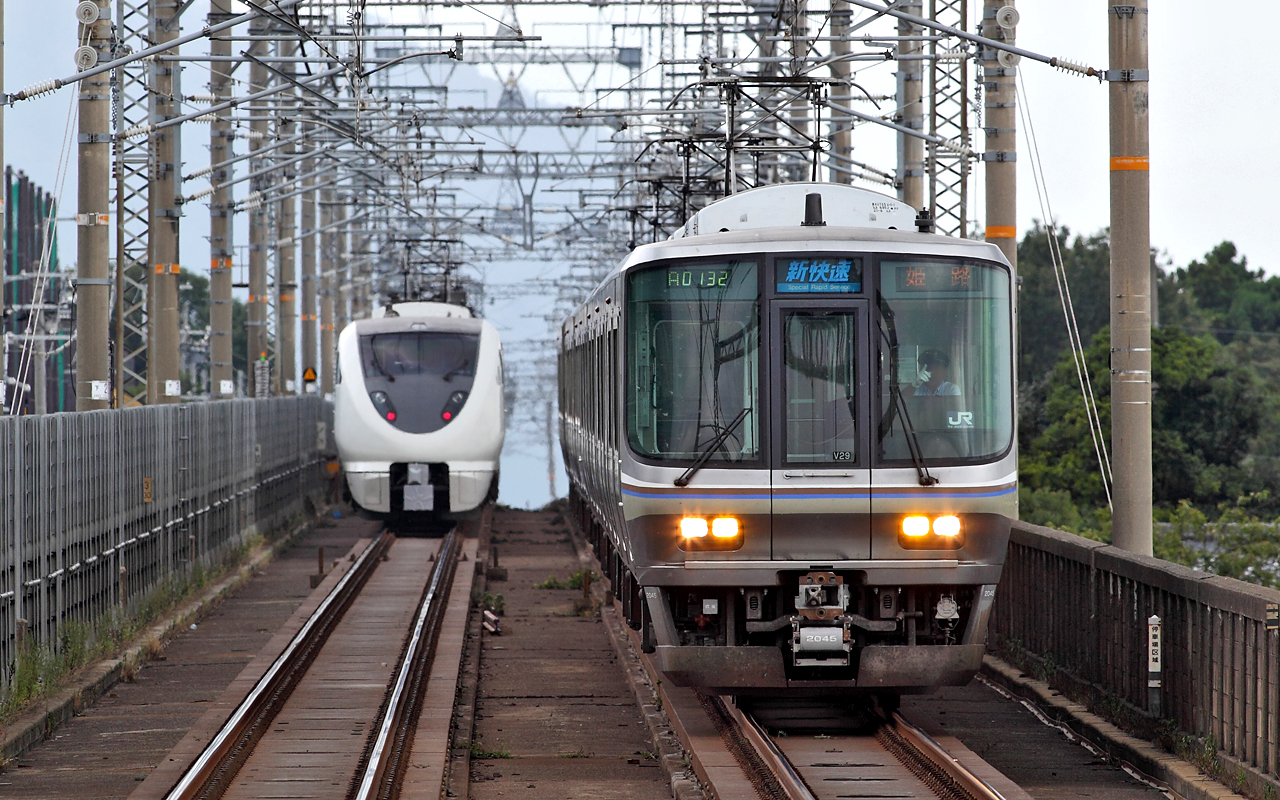
- Special Rapid Service train (right) and Thunderbird limited express (left) at Hira Station

Overview
- Native name: 湖西線
- Owner: JR West
- Locale: Kyoto Prefecture and Shiga Prefecture
- Termini: Yamashina; Ōmi-Shiotsu
- Stations: 21

Service
- Type: Heavy rail
- System: Urban Network (Yamashina – Nagahara)
- Operator(s): JR West; JR Freight

History
- Opened: July 20, 1974; 51 years ago

Technical
- Line length: 74.1 km (46.0 miles)
- Track gauge: 1,067 mm (3 ft 6 in)
- Electrification: 1,500 V DC, overhead catenary
- Operating speed: 130 km/h (81 mph)
- Train protection system: ATS-P and ATS-SW

The Kosei Line (湖西線, Kosei-sen; lit. 'Lakewest line') is a commuter rail line in Osaka-Kobe-Kyoto Metropolitan Area, operated by West Japan Railway Company (JR West). The line was completed in 1974 by the former Japanese National Railways (JNR) to provide faster access from the Kansai region to the Hokuriku region. It originates at Yamashina Station in Yamashina-ku, Kyoto and ends at Ōmi-Shiotsu Station in Nagahama, Shiga.

Its name means "the line to the west of the lake," indicating that it approximately parallels the western shore of Biwako. Trains continue from Omi-Shiotsu Station to Tsuruga Station on the Hokuriku Main Line Yamashina to Kyoto Station on the Tōkaidō Main Line for convenient transfer to lines serving the Kansai as well as the Tōkaidō Shinkansen.

In addition to local, Rapid and Special Rapid services, limited express trains such as the Thunderbird, as well as freight trains are frequently operated on the line. Only few of limited express trains stop at Katata or Omi-Imazu and others skip all stations on the line.

== History ==
A direct Tsuruga – Kyoto line was included in the 1922 Railway Construction Act.

In the meantime, the Kojaku Railway Co. opened a line from Hamaotsu on the Keihan Ishiyama Sakamoto Line 51 km (32 mi) to Omi-Imazu between 1923 and 1929. Between 1947 and 1965 there was a connection between Zeze on the Tokaido Main Line and Hamaotsu, allowing direct connection to the Tokaido Line.

The line was purchased by JNR and closed in 1969 so the Kosei line could be constructed over parts of the alignment, with the entire new line opening in 1974 as a dual track electrified line with CTC signalling.

The section from Nagahara to Ōmi-Shiotsu, originally electrified with 20 kV AC, was re-electrified to 1,500 V DC on September 24, 2006 enabling DC-only EMUs used in Osaka-Kyoto region to operate, and the Special Rapid through train service from JR Kyoto Line (Tokaido Main Line) was extended beyond Ōmi-Shiotsu to Tsuruga on the Hokuriku Main Line.

== Services and stations ==
Legends:

- ● : All trains stop
- ○ : Only "Kosei Leisure (湖西レジャー)" extra seasonal service (in winter) makes stop at Shiga
- | : All trains skip

Local (普通) trains stop at all stations, but they do not operate through services to the JR Kyoto Line.

Rapid (快速) trains operate only in the mornings, which heads south to the JR Kyoto Line. 2 services are operated every weekday morning and 1 service is operated every weekend morning.

Special Rapid (新快速) trains operate one train per hour for both directions, throughout daytime.

| Official line name | No. | Name | Japanese | Distance between stations (km) | | | | | Location | |
| Official line name | No. | Name | Japanese | | Distance from Yamashina (km) | | | | Location | |
| Official line name | No. | Name | Japanese | | | Rapid | | | Location | |
| Official line name | No. | Name | Japanese | | | | Special Rapid | | Location | |
| Official line name | No. | Name | Japanese | | | | | Transfers | Location | |
Special Rapid & Rapid: Through service to/from JR Kyoto Line
| Tōkaidō Main Line | JR-B31 | Kyoto | 京都 | 5.5 | 5.5 | ● | ● | Tōkaidō Shinkansen; Tōkaidō Main Line (JR Kyoto Line) (JR-A31); Nara Line (JR-D01); San'in Main Line (Sagano Line) (JR-E01); B Kintetsu Kyoto Line (B01); Kyoto Municipal Subway Karasuma Line (K11) | Shimogyō-ku, Kyoto | Kyoto |
| Tōkaidō Main Line | JR-B30 | Yamashina | 山科 | – | 0.0 | ● | ● | Tōkaidō Main Line (Biwako Line) (JR-A30); Kyoto City Subway Tozai Line (T07); Keihan Keishin Line (OT31: Keihan-yamashina) | Yamashina-ku, Kyoto | Kyoto |
| Kosei Line | JR-B30 | Yamashina | 山科 | – | 0.0 | ● | ● | Tōkaidō Main Line (Biwako Line) (JR-A30); Kyoto City Subway Tozai Line (T07); Keihan Keishin Line (OT31: Keihan-yamashina) | Yamashina-ku, Kyoto | Kyoto |
| Kosei Line | JR-B29 | Ōtsukyō | 大津京 | 5.4 | 5.4 | ● | ● | Keihan Ishiyama Sakamoto Line (OT15: Keihan-otsukyo) | Ōtsu | Shiga |
| Kosei Line | JR-B28 | Karasaki | 唐崎 | 3.1 | 8.5 | | | | | | Ōtsu | Shiga |
| Kosei Line | JR-B27 | Hieizan Sakamoto | 比叡山坂本 | 2.6 | 11.1 | ● | ● | | Ōtsu | Shiga |
| Kosei Line | JR-B26 | Ogoto-onsen | おごと温泉 | 3.4 | 14.5 | ● | | | | Ōtsu | Shiga |
| Kosei Line | JR-B25 | Katata | 堅田 | 3.2 | 17.7 | ● | ● | | Ōtsu | Shiga |
| Kosei Line | JR-B24 | Ono | 小野 | 2.1 | 19.8 | | | | | | Ōtsu | Shiga |
| Kosei Line | JR-B23 | Wani | 和邇 | 2.7 | 22.5 | | | | | | Ōtsu | Shiga |
| Kosei Line | JR-B22 | Hōrai | 蓬莱 | 2.4 | 24.9 | | | | | | Ōtsu | Shiga |
| Kosei Line | JR-B21 | Shiga | 志賀 | 2.4 | 27.3 | | | ○ | | Ōtsu | Shiga |
| Kosei Line | JR-B20 | Hira | 比良 | 2.7 | 30.0 | | | | | | Ōtsu | Shiga |
| Kosei Line | JR-B19 | Ōmi-Maiko | 近江舞子 | 2.2 | 32.2 | ● | ● | | Ōtsu | Shiga |
| Kosei Line | JR-B18 | Kita Komatsu | 北小松 | 2.3 | 34.5 | ● | ● | | Ōtsu | Shiga |
| Kosei Line | JR-B17 | Ōmi-Takashima | 近江高島 | 6.4 | 40.9 | ● | ● | | Takashima | Shiga |
| Kosei Line | JR-B16 | Adogawa | 安曇川 | 4.1 | 45.0 | ● | ● | | Takashima | Shiga |
| Kosei Line | JR-B15 | Shin-Asahi | 新旭 | 3.3 | 48.3 | ● | ● | | Takashima | Shiga |
| Kosei Line | JR-B14 | Ōmi-Imazu | 近江今津 | 4.9 | 53.2 | ● | ● | | Takashima | Shiga |
| Kosei Line | JR-B13 | Ōmi-Nakashō | 近江中庄 | 4.8 | 58.0 | ● | ● | | Takashima | Shiga |
| Kosei Line | JR-B12 | Makino | マキノ | 3.2 | 61.2 | ● | ● | | Takashima | Shiga |
| Kosei Line | JR-B11 | Nagahara | 永原 | 7.1 | 68.3 | ● | ● | | Nagahama | Shiga |
| Kosei Line | JR-B10 | Ōmi-Shiotsu | 近江塩津 | 5.8 | 74.1 | ● | ● | Hokuriku Main Line (JR-A03) | Nagahama | Shiga |
| Hokuriku Main Line | JR-B10 | Ōmi-Shiotsu | 近江塩津 | 5.8 | 74.1 | ● | ● | Hokuriku Main Line (JR-A03) | Nagahama | Shiga |
| Hokuriku Main Line | JR-B09 | Shin-Hikida | 新疋田 | 7.8 | 81.9 | ● | ● | | Tsuruga | Fukui |
| Hokuriku Main Line | JR-B08 | Tsuruga | 敦賀 | 6.7 | 88.6 | ● | ● | Hokuriku Main Line (JR-A01); Obama Line; Hapi-Line Fukui Line; Hokuriku Shinkansen | Tsuruga | Fukui |

Only 4-car trains are capable of going as far as Tsuruga at the moment, and the rear eight cars in a 12-car set are uncoupled at Omi-Imazu Station.

== Rolling stock ==
=== Current ===
==== Passenger ====
===== Local and Rapid =====
- 221 series (mostly through rapid services to the Tokaido Main Line and the Sanyo Main Line, also some operate as local)
- 223-2500 series (same as above)
- 223-6000 series (same as above)
- 225 series
- 521-0 series (only through services continuing to the Hokuriku Main Line)

===== Special Rapid and Local =====
- 223-1000/2000 series
- 225-0/100 series

===== Limited Express =====
- 681 series (Thunderbird services)
- 683 series (Thunderbird services)

==== Freight ====
- EF510

=== Former ===
==== EMU ====
- 113 series (within the line and to Kyoto only until April 2023)
- 117 series (same as above)
- 125 series (until March 2009)
- 201 series
- 205 series
- 207 series
- 321 series (until March 2016)
- 419 series (until October 2006)
- 475 series (until October 2006)
- 485 series (Raichō services, until March 2011)

==== DMU ====
- KiHa 20 series (until 1991)
- KiHa 26 series (until 1991)
- KiHa 48 (until 1991)

==== Electric locomotive ====
- EF81

== See also ==
- List of railway lines in Japan
