= Hira Station =

Hira Station may refer to:

- Hira Station (Aichi), Japan
- Hira Station (Shiga), Japan
