= Katata Station =

Railway station in Ōtsu, Shiga Prefecture, Japan

Katata Station 堅田駅
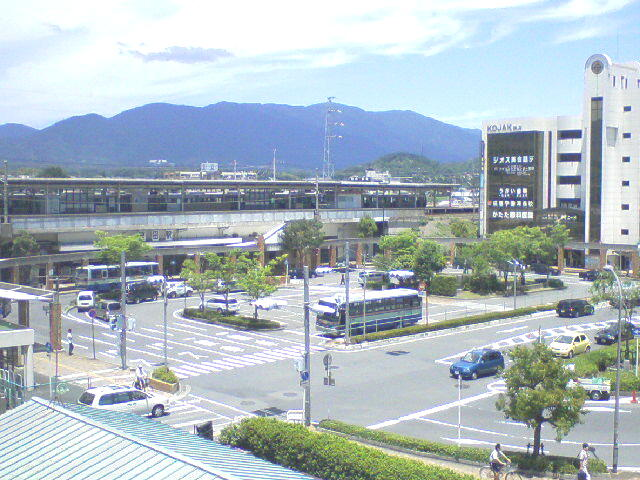
- Katata Station, June 2007

General information
- Location: 1-1-70 Mano, Ōtsu-shi, Shiga-ken 520-0232; Japan
- Coordinates: 35.1212°N 135.9152°E
- Operator: JR West
- Line: Kosei Line
- Distance: 17.7 km from Yamashina
- Platforms: 2 island platforms
- Tracks: 4
- Connections: Bus terminal

Construction
- Structure type: Elevated
- Accessible: Yes

Other information
- Station code: JR-B25
- Website: Official website

History
- Opened: 10 July 1974

Passengers
- FY 2023: 14,750 daily
Location
- Location within Shiga Prefecture Location within Japan

Katata Station (堅田駅, Katata-eki) is a passenger railway station located in the city of Ōtsu, Shiga Prefecture, Japan, operated by the West Japan Railway Company (JR West).

== Lines ==
Katata Station is served by the Kosei Line, and is 17.7 kilometres (11.0 miles) from the starting point of the line at Yamashina and 23.2 kilometres (14.4 miles) from Kyoto.

== Station layout ==
The station consists of two elevated island platforms with the station building underneath. The station has a Midori no Madoguchi staffed ticket office.

== Platforms ==
1, 2	■ Kosei Line	for Ōmi-Imazu and Tsuruga
3, 4	■ Kosei Line	for Kyoto

== Adjacent Stations ==
«	Service	»
Kosei Line
Hieizan Sakamoto	Special Rapid Service	Ōmi-Maiko
Ogoto-onsen	Rapid Service	Ōmi-Maiko
Ogoto-onsen	Local	Ono

== History ==
The station opened on 20 July 1974 as a station on the Japan National Railway (JNR). The station became part of the West Japan Railway Company on 1 April 1987 due to the privatization and dissolution of the JNR.

Station numbering was introduced in March 2018 with Kakata being assigned station number JR-B25.

== Passenger statistics ==
In fiscal 2019, the station was used by an average of 7,843 passengers daily (boarding passengers only).

== Surrounding area ==
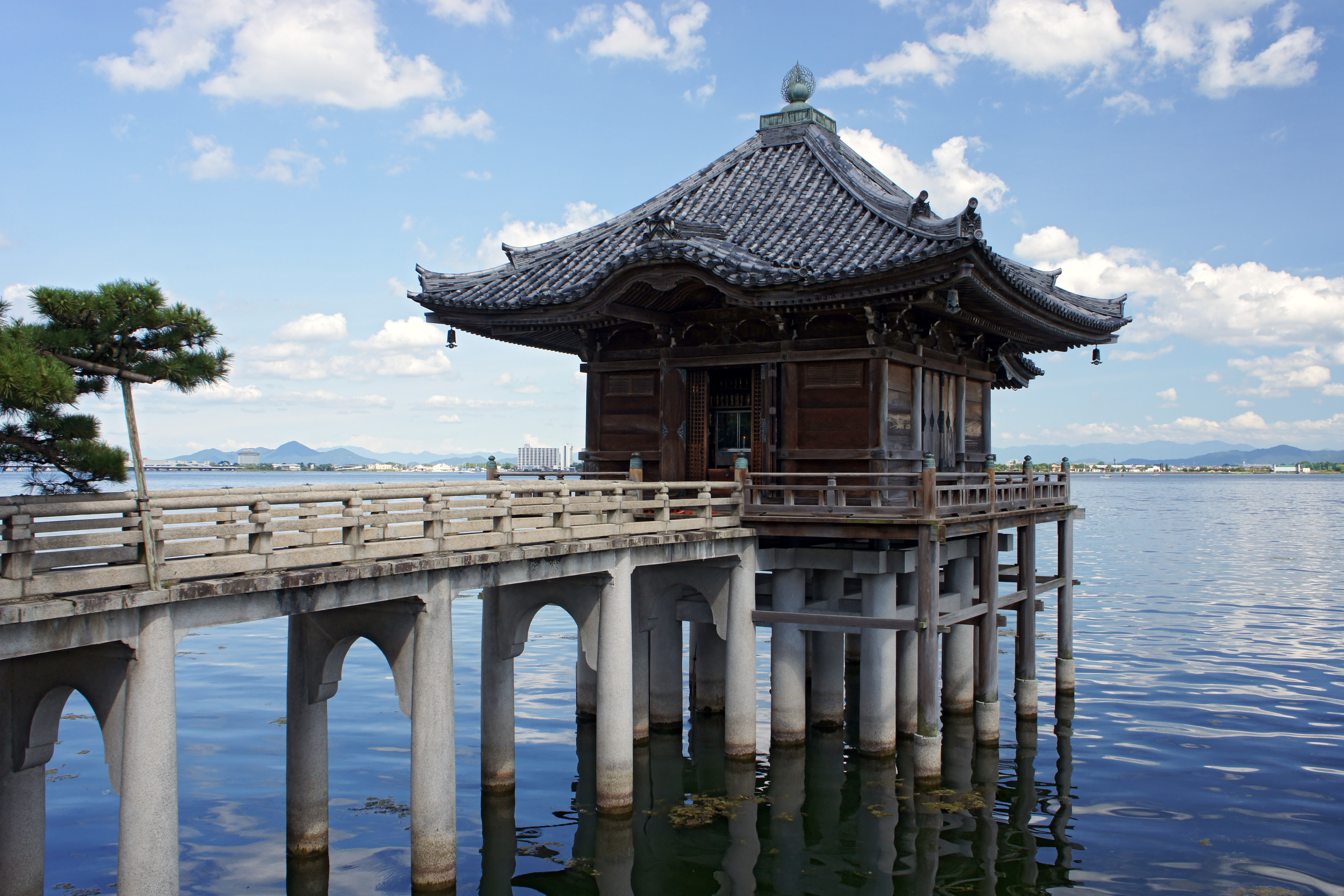
Mangetsu-ji Ukimidō, overlooking Lake Biwa

- Mangetsu-ji, noted for its "floating hall" Ukimidō
- Dejima Lighthouse, Built as a wooden lighthouse in 1933
- Tomb of Koto-Naishi, wife of Nitta Yoshisada
- Katada Church, Built in 1930, designed by William Merrell Vories

== See also ==
- List of railway stations in Japan
