= Yamashina Station =

Railway and metro station in Kyoto, Japan

Yamashina Station / Keihan-yamashina Station 山科駅 / 京阪山科駅
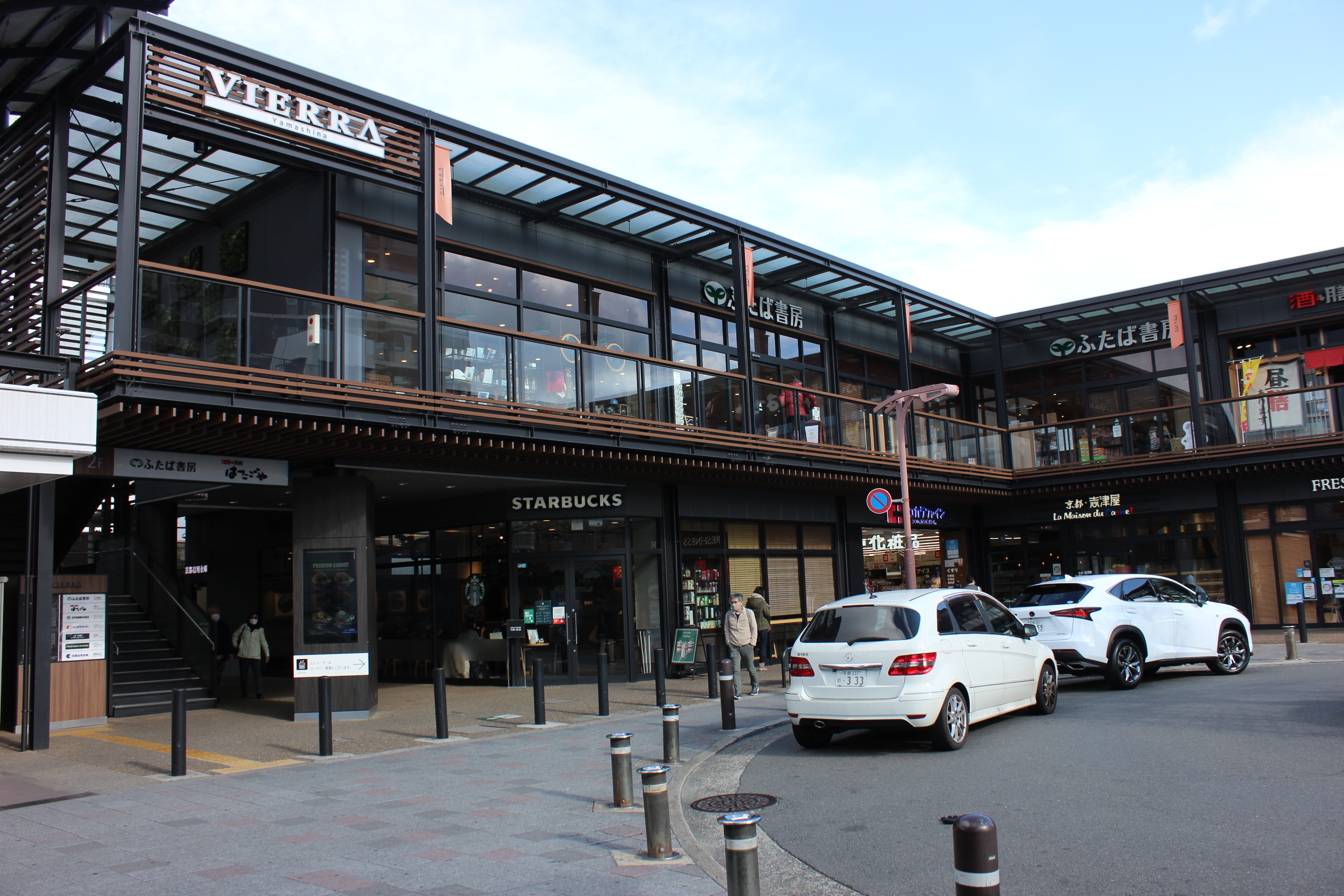
- Vierra Yamashina of Yamashina Station Building, 20 December 2020

General information
- Location: Yamashina-ku, Kyoto City, Kyoto Prefecture; Japan
- Coordinates: 34°59′32″N 135°49′02″E
- Operator: JR West; Kyoto Municipal Transportation Bureau; Keihan Electric Railway
- Connections: Bus Terminal (Keihan Bus)
Location

Yamashina Station (山科駅, Yamashina-eki) is a train station in Yamashina Ward, Kyoto City, Kyoto Prefecture, Japan.

Yamashina station has two sections, an underground subway section and above-ground JR section. In addition, Keihan-yamashina Station (京阪山科駅, Keihan Yamashina-eki) on the Keishin Line of Keihan Electric Railway is located just in front of the JR station. This article also covers the Keihan station. There is a Keihan Bus terminal in front of the station.

== Lines ==
- JR West
  - Tōkaidō Line (Biwako Line)
  - Kosei Line
- Kyoto City Subway
  - Tozai Line
- Keihan Railway
  - Keishin Line

== Layout ==
=== Yamashina Station (JR West) ===
A 30 B 30 Yamashina Station 山科駅
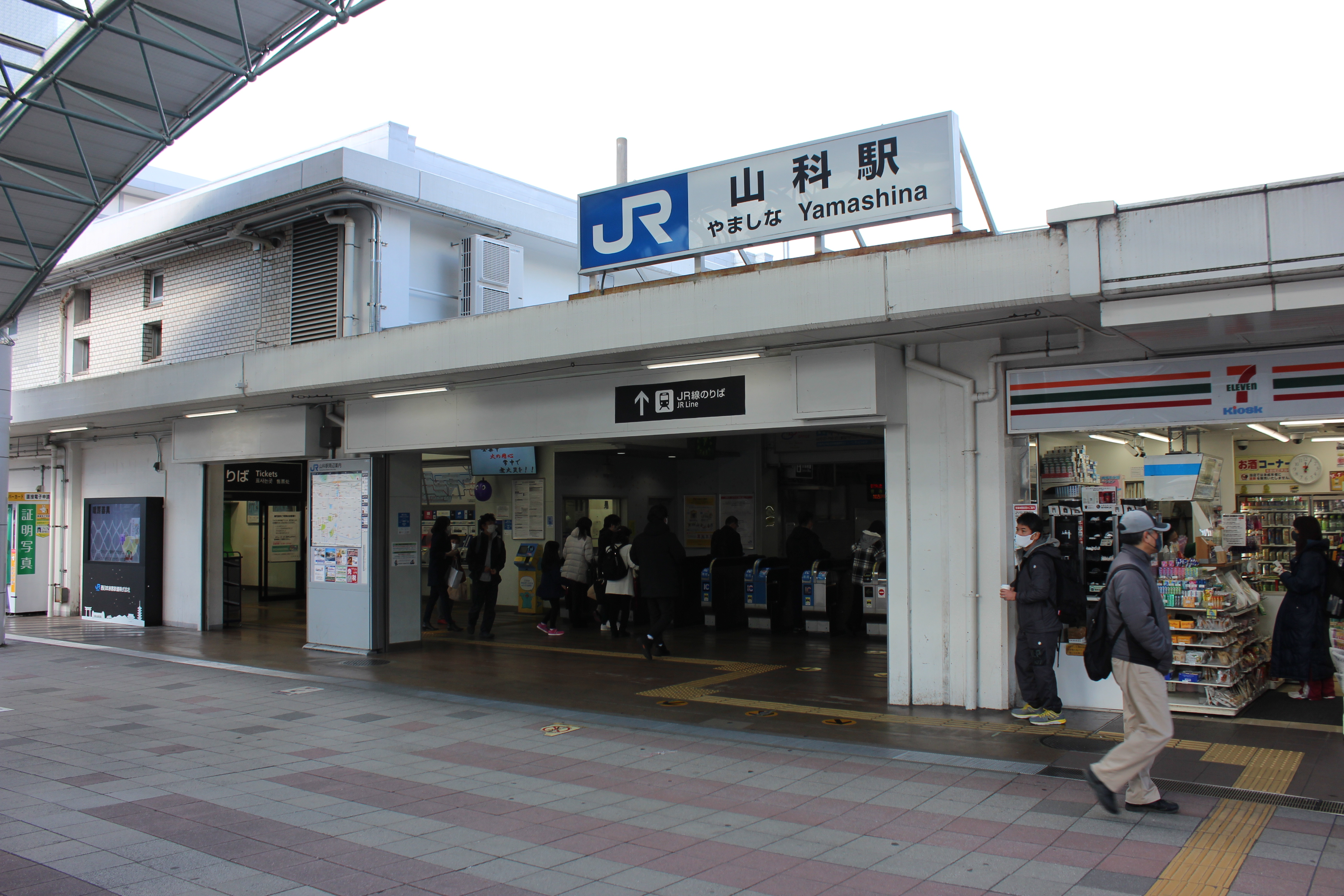
- Entrance

General information
- System: JR West station
- Operator: JR West
- Lines: A Tōkaidō Line (Biwako Line); B Kosei Line

Construction
- Structure type: At grade
- Accessible: Yes

Other information
- Station code: A30 (Tokaido Line); B30 (Kosei Line)

History
- Opened: 1 August 1921

Passengers
- FY 2023: 64,934 daily
Services
Preceding station	JR West	Following station
Kyoto A 31 Terminus	Biwako Line	Ōtsu A 29 towards Nagahama
Kyoto B 31 Terminus	Kosei Line	Ōtsukyō B 29 towards Tsuruga
Location

The JR station has two island platforms with four tracks.

1	■ JR Kyōto Line	for Kyoto and Osaka (trains from the Kosei Line, limited express "Rakuraku Biwako", part of special rapid service); Kansai Airport Limited Express "Haruka 3, 9, and 11" for Kansai Airport
2	■ JR Kyōto Line	for Kyoto and Osaka (trains from the Biwako Line)
3	■ Biwako Line	for Kusatsu and Maibara (local trains, special rapid service)
3	■ Kosei Line	for Katata and Ōmi-Imazu
4	■ Biwako Line	for Kusatsu and Maibara (special rapid service in the morning, limited express "Biwako Express")
4	■ through to the Kusatsu Line	for Kusatsu and Kibukawa
4	■ Kosei Line	for Katata and Ōmi-Imazu (part of trains in the rush hour)

- This station is an intermediate station on the "Biwako Line", but only the Tokaido Line for Maibara is informed as that common name, and the line for Kyoto and Osaka is as the "JR Kyoto Line". There are trains of the Biwako Line and the Kosei Line between this station and Kyoto.
- Five of the 60 daily runs of the Kansai Airport limited express "Haruka" stop at this station.

=== Yamashina Station (Kyoto City Subway) ===
T07 Yamashina Station 山科駅
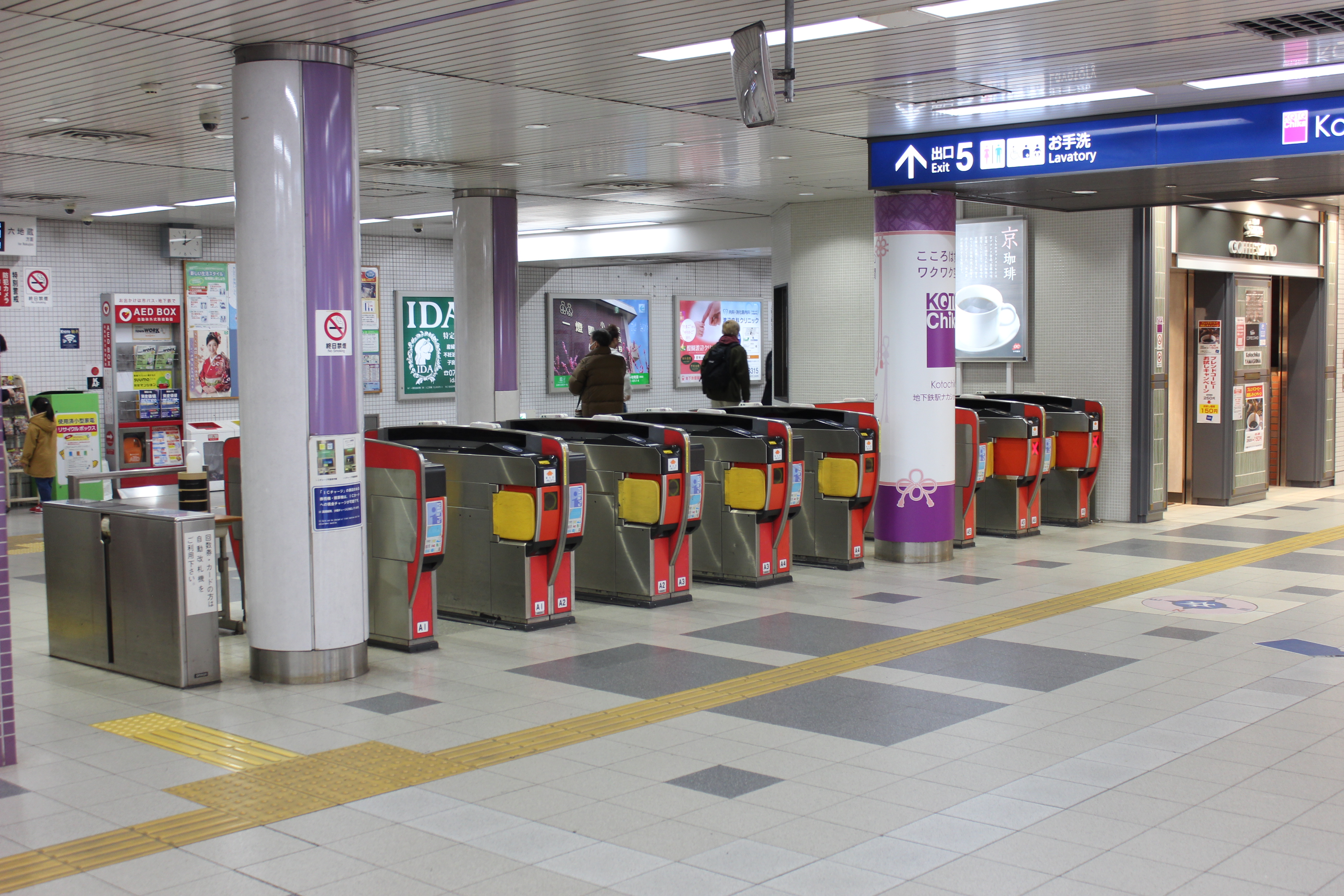
- Ticket gate

General information
- System: Kyoto City Subway station
- Operator: Kyoto Municipal; Transportation Bureau
- Line: Tōzai Line

Construction
- Structure type: Underground
- Accessible: Yes

Other information
- Station code: T07

History
- Opened: 12 October 1997

Passengers
- FY 2023: 41,255 daily
Services
Preceding station	Kyoto Municipal Subway	Following station
Misasagi T08 towards Uzumasa Tenjingawa	Tōzai Line	Higashino T06 towards Rokujizō
Location

The subway station has an island platform with two tracks.

1	■ Tōzai Line	for Karasuma Oike and Uzumasa Tenjingawa
2	■ Tōzai Line	for Daigo and Rokujizō

=== Keihan-yamashina Station (Keihan Railway) ===
OT31 Keihan-yamashina Station 京阪山科駅
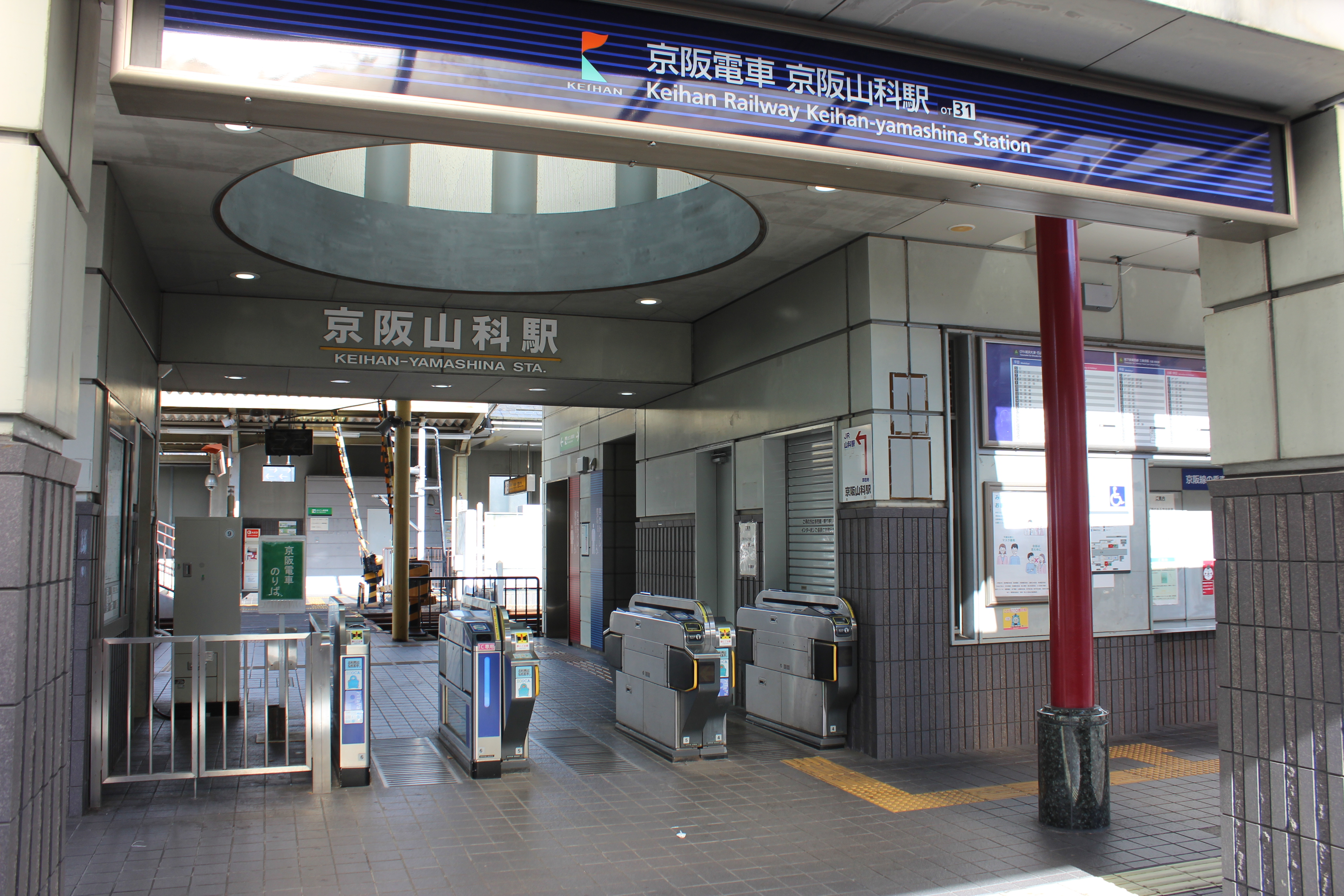
- Ticket gate

General information
- System: Keihan Railway station
- Operator: Keihan Electric Railway
- Line: Keishin Line

Construction
- Structure type: At grade
- Accessible: Yes

Other information
- Station code: OT31

History
- Opened: 15 August 1912
- Former names: Bishamon-michi Station (1912-1921); Yamashina-ekimae Station (1921-1953)

Passengers
- FY 2023: 3,149 daily
Location

The Keihan station has two side platforms with two tracks.

north side	■ Keishin Line	for Biwako-hamaotsu; Change trains at Hamaotsu for Ishiyamadera and Sakamoto
south side	■ Keishin Line	for Sanjō Keihan, Kyōto Shiyakusho-mae and Uzumasa Tenjingawa; Change trains at Sanjo Keihan for the Keihan Line (Demachiyanagi, Osaka (Yodoyabashi, Nakanoshima))

== History ==
Station numbering was introduced to the JR lines in March 2018 with Yamashina being assigned station number JR-A30 for the Biwako Line and JR B-30 for the Kosei Line.

== Adjacent stations ==
«	Service	»
JR West (Yamashina)
Tōkaidō Line (Biwako Line)
Limited Express "Hida": Does not stop at this station
Ōtsu (A29)	Local	Kyoto (A31)
Ōtsu (A29)	Special Rapid Service	Kyoto (A31)
Ōtsu (A29)	Kansai Airport Limited Express "Haruka"	Kyoto (A31)
Kosei Line
Ōtsukyō (B29)	Local	Kyoto (B31)
Ōtsukyō (B29)	Rapid Service	Kyoto (B31)
Ōtsukyō (B29)	Special Rapid Service	Kyoto (B31)
Kyoto City Subway (Yamashina)
Tozai Line
Misasagi (T08)	-	Higashino (T06)
Keihan Railway (Keihan-yamashina)
Keishin Line
Misasagi (T08)	-	Shinomiya (OT32)

=== Yamashina Station (1879-1921) ===
«	Service	»
Japanese Government Railway Tōkaidō Line (Old route)
Ōtani	-	Inari
