= Ōmi-Imazu Station =

Railway station in Takashima, Shiga Prefecture, Japan

Ōmi-Imazu Station 近江今津駅
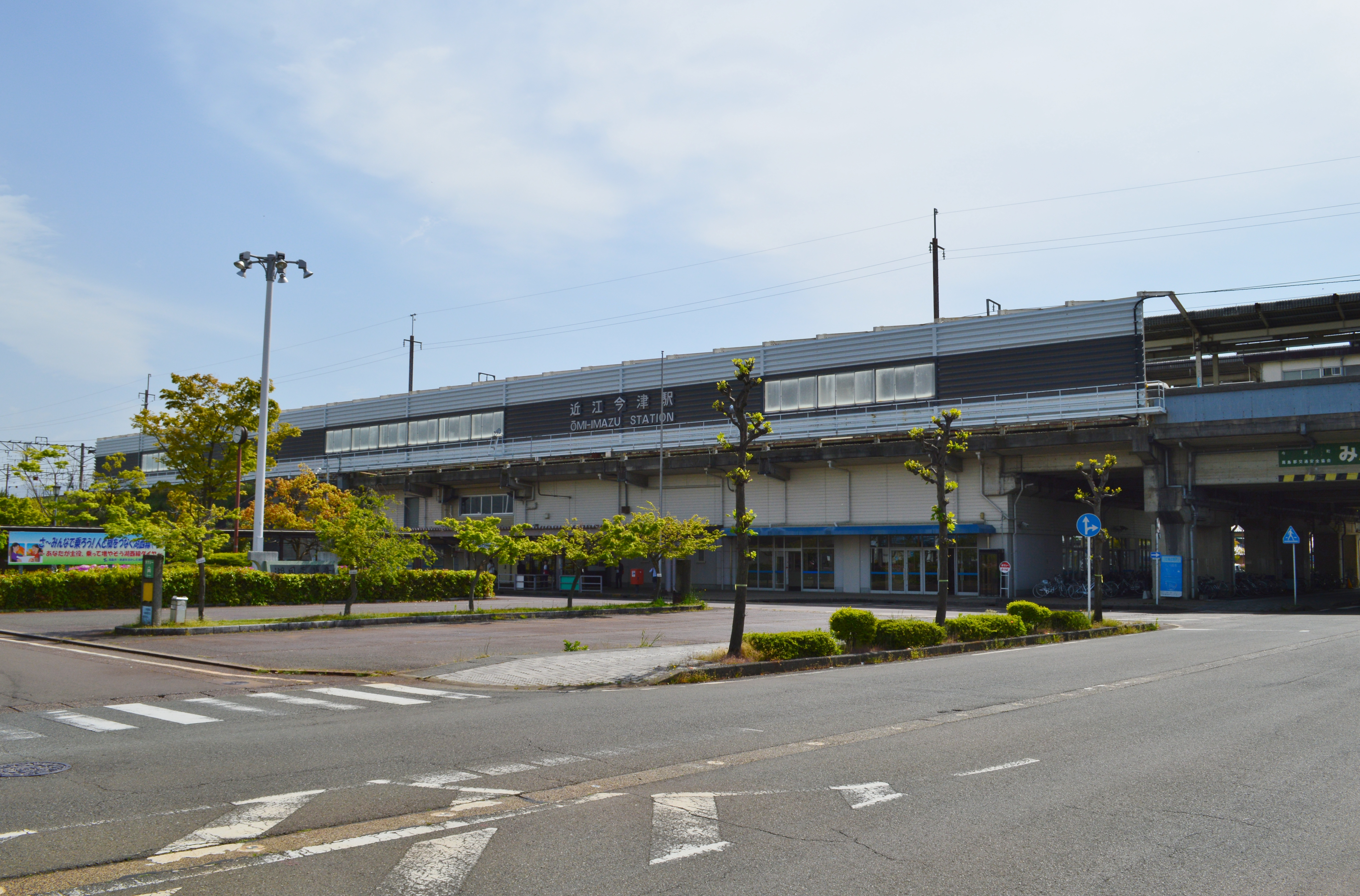
- Ōmi-Imazu Station building, May 2017

General information
- Location: 1 Chome Imazucho Nakoji, Takashima, Shiga 520-1631; Japan
- Coordinates: 35.3971°N 136.0318°E
- Operator: JR West
- Line: Kosei Line
- Distance: 53.2 km from Yamashina
- Platforms: 2 island platforms
- Tracks: 4
- Connections: Bus terminal

Construction
- Structure type: Elevated
- Accessible: Yes

Other information
- Station code: JR-B14
- Website: Official website

History
- Opened: 20 July 1974

Passengers
- FY 2023: 3,412 daily
Location
- Location within Shiga Prefecture Location within Japan

Ōmi-Imazu Station (近江今津駅, Ōmi-Imazu eki) is a passenger railway station located in the city of Takashima, Shiga Prefecture, Japan, operated by the West Japan Railway Company (JR West). As a key station of the Kosei Line, the station has a yard on its south side.

== Lines ==
Ōmi-Imazu Station is served by the Kosei Line, and is 53.2 kilometres (33.1 miles) from the starting point of the line at Yamashina and 58.7 kilometres (36.5 miles) from Kyoto. Previously most of the Special Rapid Service trains from the JR Kyoto Line turned at this station until 2006 when most Special Rapid Service trains were extended to Tsuruga Station. As of 2011, there is one such train in the morning that terminates at the station. The extension of the services to the north section required coupling and releasing of cars at this station since platforms of Ōmi-Shiotsu Station and beyond can only handle 4-car trains. In order to facilitate these works, a signal was newly added to the track 2 of the station.

== Station layout ==
The station is elevated with two elevated island platforms each capable of serving 12-car trains, as well as sidetracks for passing trains. The station provides the on-line ticket reservation service. While automatic ticket gates have not been installed, ICOCA and other IC cards can be processed via a stand-alone machine without the need to present to a staff member. Regular tickets will need to be processed by the staffed window; during rush hour times, an additional staff member is located outside the window to process tickets quickly.

=== Platforms ===
1	■ Limited Express "Thunderbird"	for Tsuruga
1	■ Kosei Line	part of local trains for Ōmi-Shiotsu and Tsuruga
2	■ Kosei Line	local trains, rapid service and special rapid service for Ōmi-Shiotsu and Tsuruga local trains, rapid service and special rapid service for Katata and Kyoto
3	■ Kosei Line	local trains returning for Nagahara, Ōmi-Shiotsu and Tsuruga local trains for Katata and Kyoto
4	■ Limited Express "Thunderbird"	for Kyoto and Osaka
4	■ Kosei Line	a part of local trains for Katata and Kyoto in the morning and the evening a part of special rapid service for Katata, Kyoto and Osaka in the morning

== Adjacent Stations ==
«	Service	»
West Japan Railway Company Kosei Line
Shin-Asahi	Local	Ōmi-Nakashō
Shin-Asahi	Rapid Service	Ōmi-Nakashō
Shin-Asahi	Special Rapid Service	Ōmi-Nakashō

== History ==
The station opened on 20 July 1974 as a station on the Japan National Railway (JNR). The station became part of the West Japan Railway Company on 1 April 1987 due to the privatization and dissolution of the JNR.

Station numbering was introduced in March 2018 with Ōmi-Imazu being assigned station number JR-B14.

== Passenger statistics ==
In fiscal 2019, the station was used by an average of 1989 passengers daily (boarding passengers only).

== Surrounding area ==
- Imazu Port
- Imazu Vories Museum
- Imazu Church
- Otsu Family Court Takashima Branch Office
- Takashima Summary Court
- Takashima City Hall (formerly Imazu Cultural Arts Hall)

== See also ==
- List of railway stations in Japan
