= Kyōto Station =

Major railway and metro station in Kyoto, Japan

Kyōto Station 京都駅
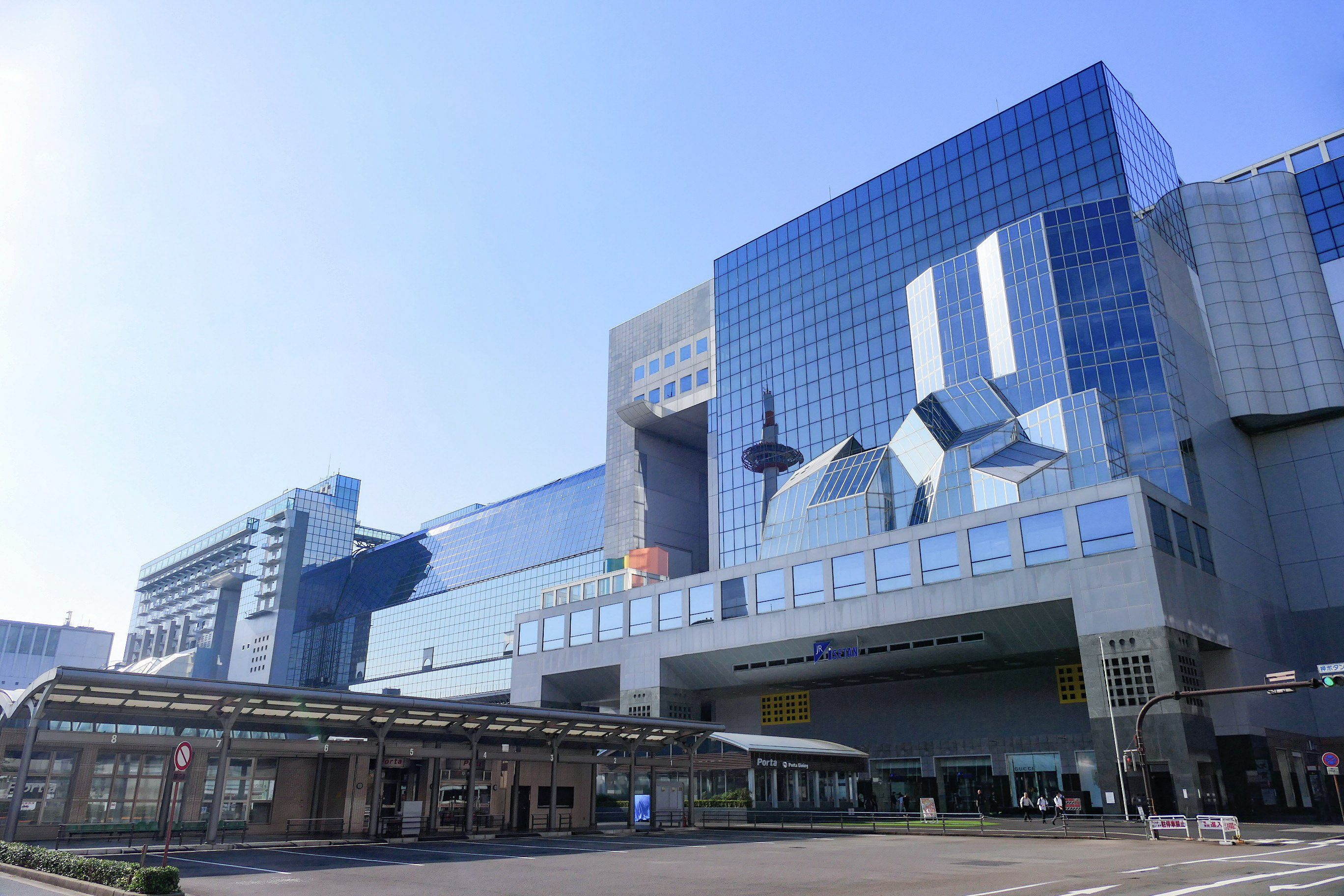
- Kyoto Station Building

Japanese name
- Shinjitai: 京都駅
- Kyūjitai: 京都驛
- Hiragana: きょうとえき

General information
- Location: Shimogyo-ku, Kyoto City; Kyōto Prefecture; Japan
- Operator: JR West; JR Central; Kintetsu Railway; Kyoto Municipal Subway
- Connections: Bus terminal

Other information
- Station code: K11, B01

Passengers
- 2024: 233 million
Location
- Location within Kyoto city Location within Kyoto Prefecture Location within Japan

Kyōto Station (京都駅, Kyōto-eki) is a major railway station and transportation hub in Kyoto, Japan. It has Japan's third-largest station building (after Osaka Station，Nagoya Station) and is one of the country's largest buildings, incorporating a shopping mall, hotel, movie theater, Isetan department store, and several local government facilities under one 15-story roof.

== Lines ==
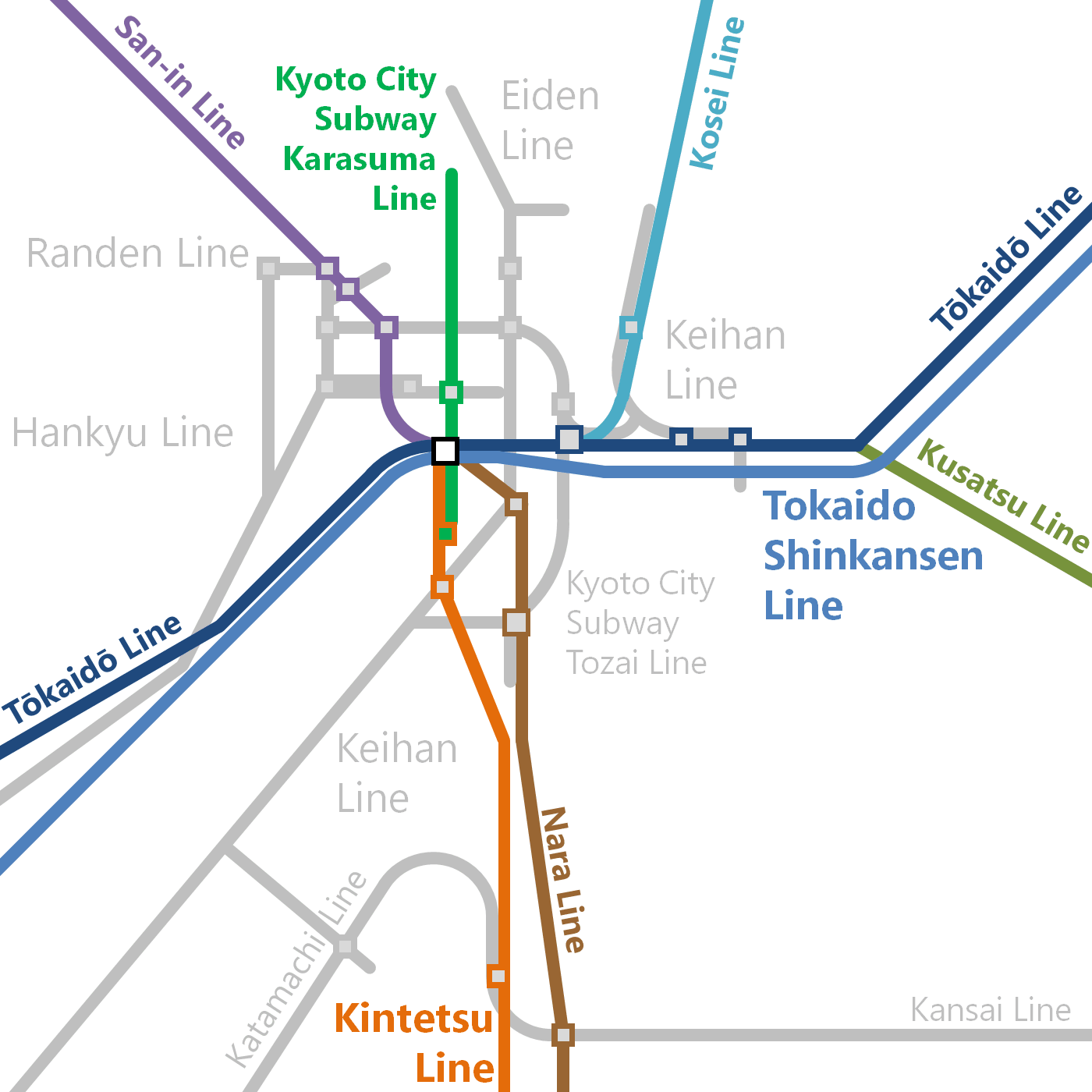
Railroad map around Kyoto station

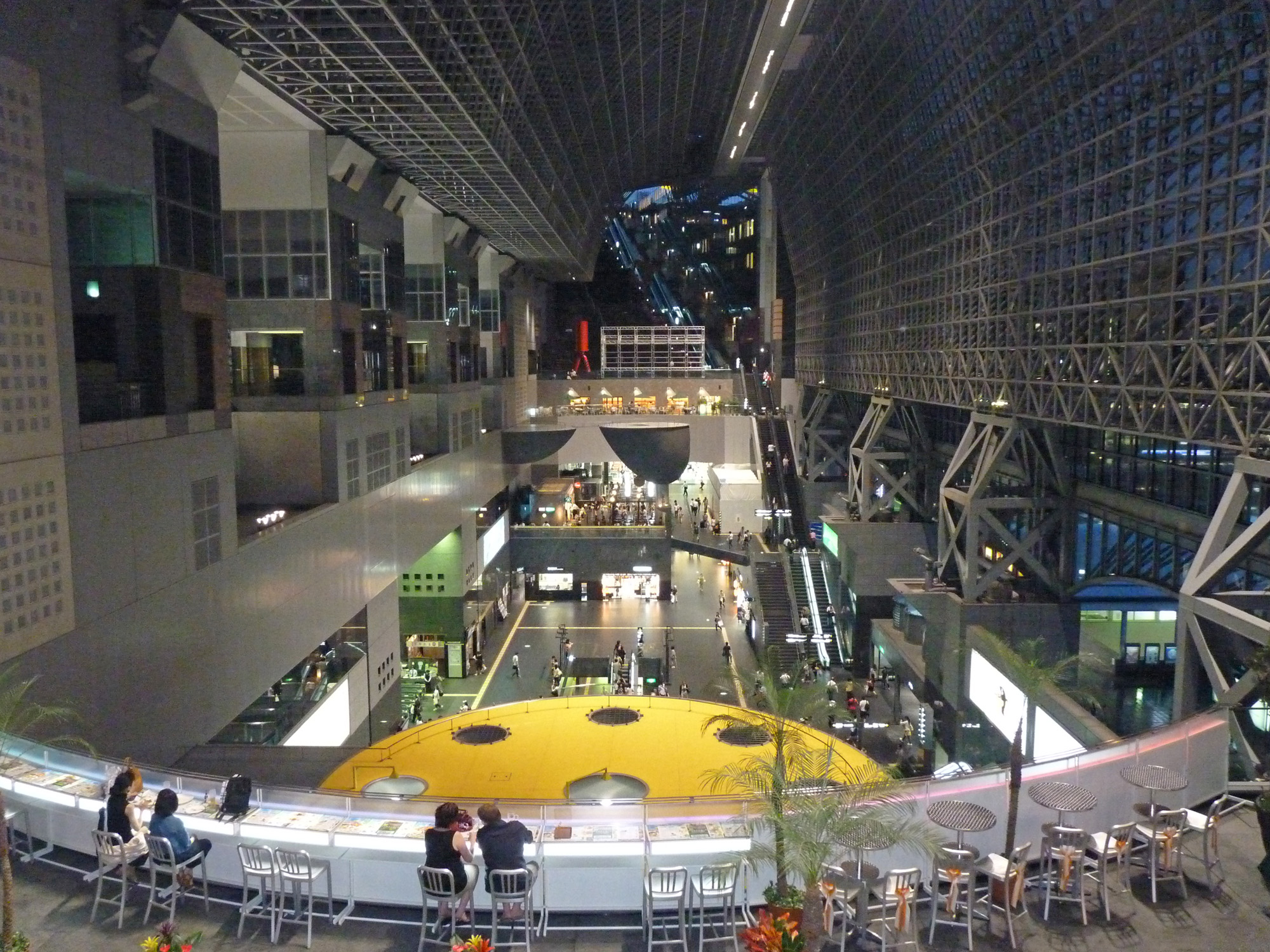
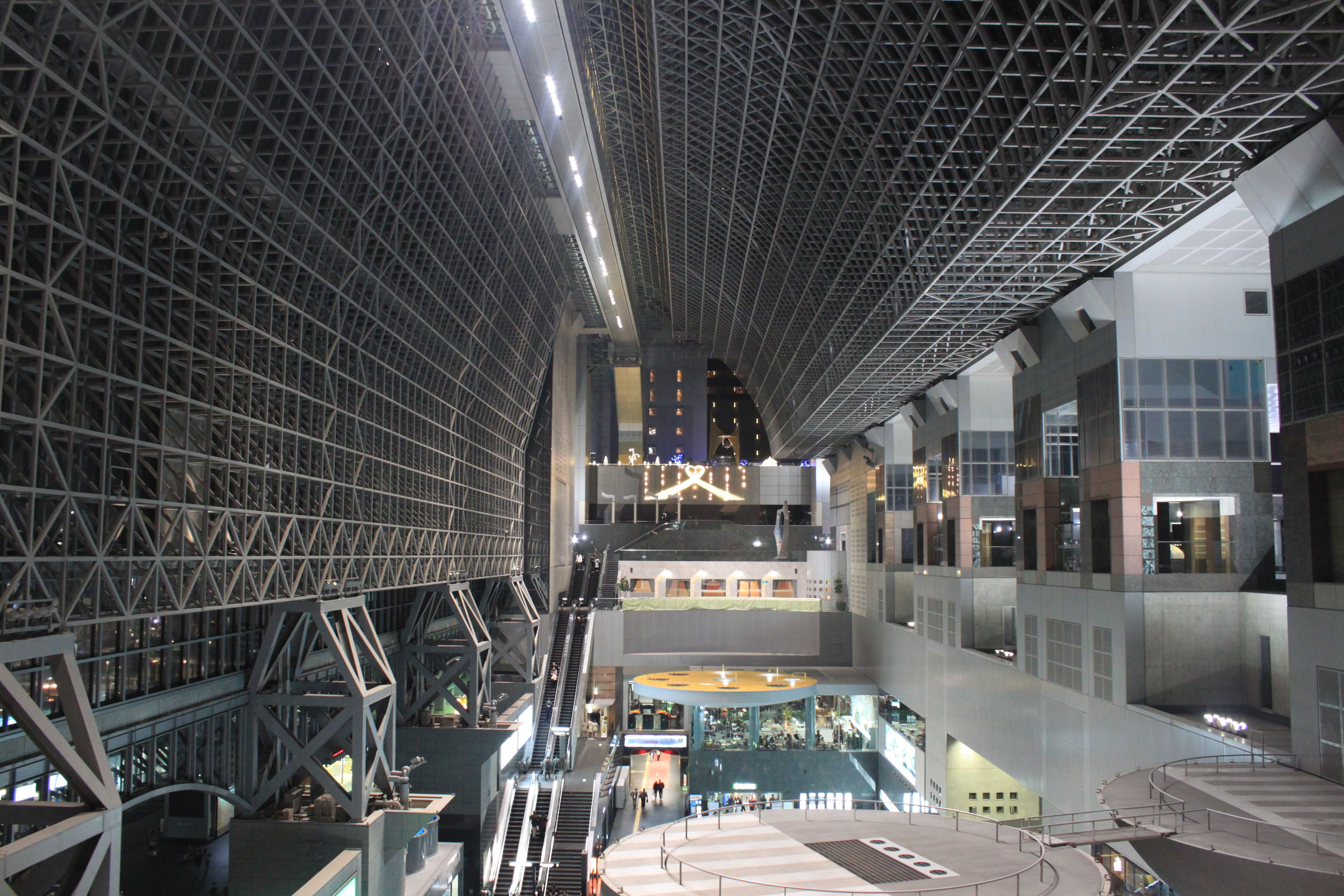
Station concourse, west and east ends viewed from upper level

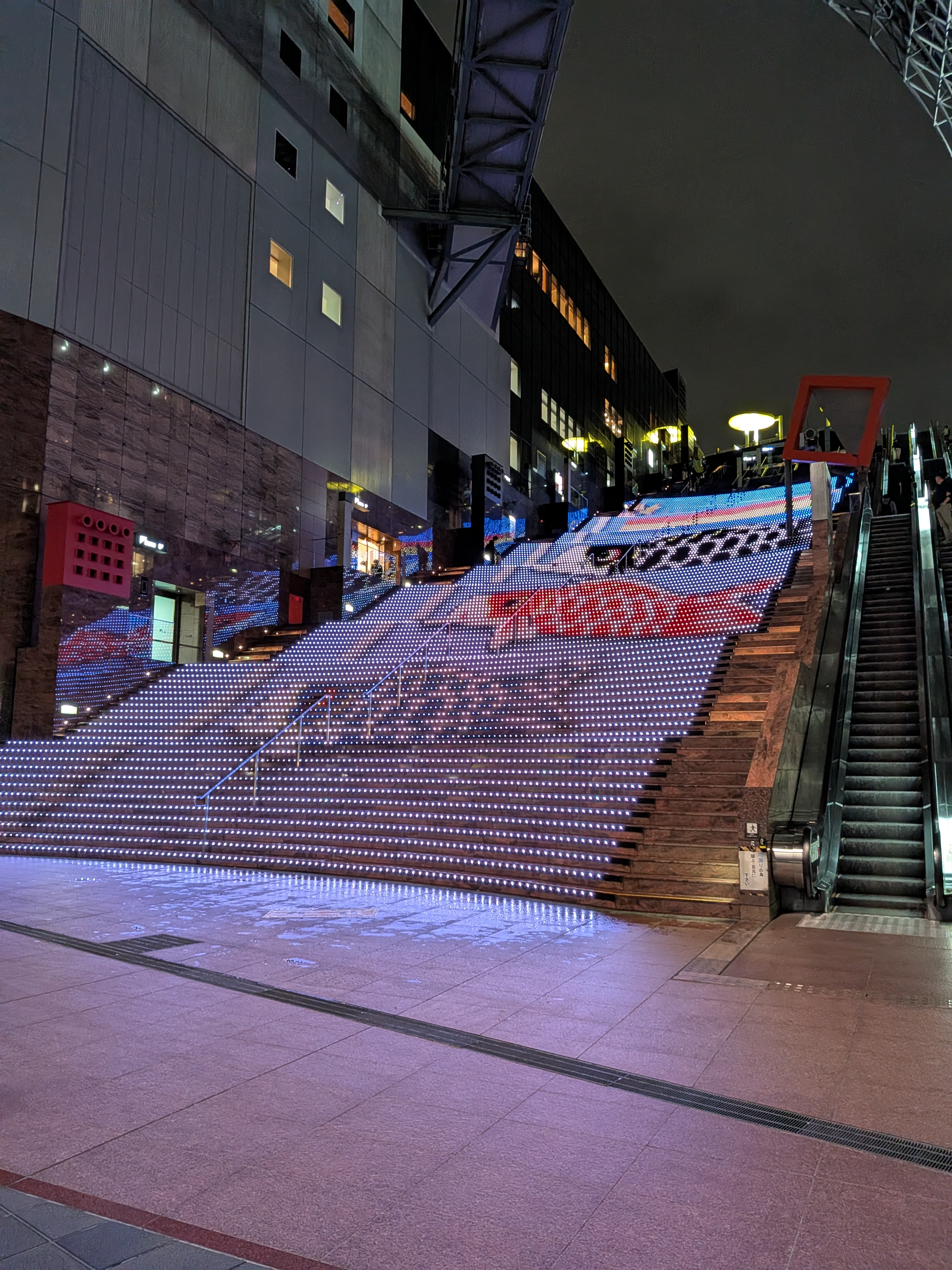
grand staircase in Kyoto Station Building

Kyoto Station is served by the following railway lines:

- JR Central
  - Tokaido Shinkansen
- JR West
  - A Biwako Line (Tōkaidō Main Line)
  - A JR Kyōto Line (Tōkaidō Main Line)
  - E Sagano Line (San'in Main Line)
  - D Nara Line
- Kintetsu Railway
  - Kyoto/Kashihara Line
  - Kyoto Line
- Kyoto Municipal Subway
  - Karasuma Line

In addition to the lines above, the following lines, among others, have through services to Kyoto Station:

- JR West
  - B Kosei Line
  - C Kusatsu Line

== JR ==
A 31 B 31 D 01 E 01 Kyōto Station 京都駅
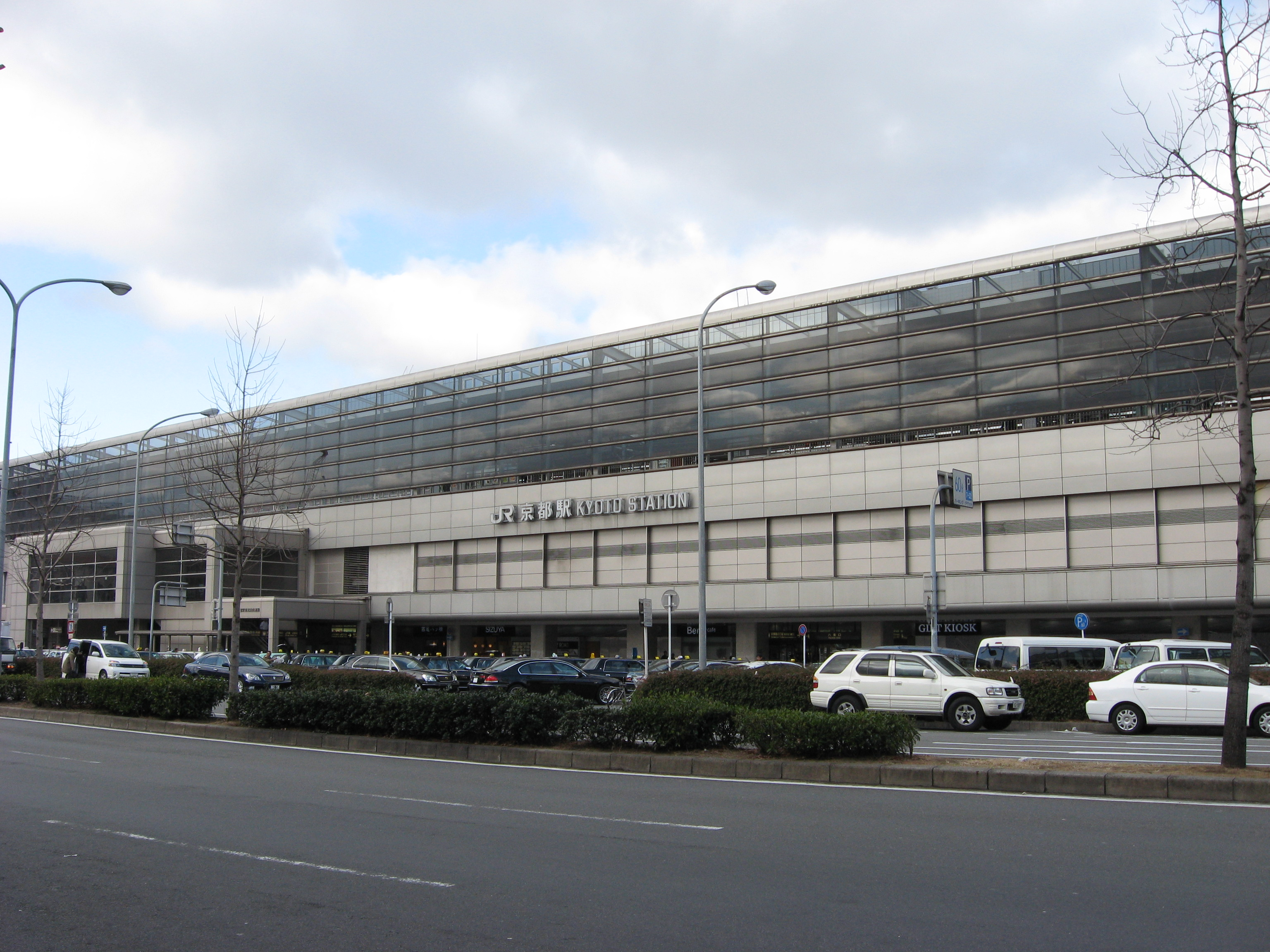
- Hachijō-side building of Kyōto station

General information
- Location: 901 Higashi-Shiokōjichō; Shimogyō-ku, Kyoto; Japan
- Coordinates: 34°59′07.6″N 135°45′28.0″E
- Operator: JR West; JR Central (Tōkaidō Shinkansen only)

History
- Opened: 1877; 149 years ago

Passengers
- 2024–2025: 344,080 daily (JR West); 89,721 daily (JR Central)

Services
Preceding station	JR Central	Following station
Shin-Ōsaka Terminus	Tokaido Shinkansen Nozomi	Nagoya towards Tokyo
Shin-Ōsaka Terminus	Tokaido Shinkansen Hikari Kodama	Maibara towards Tokyo
Location

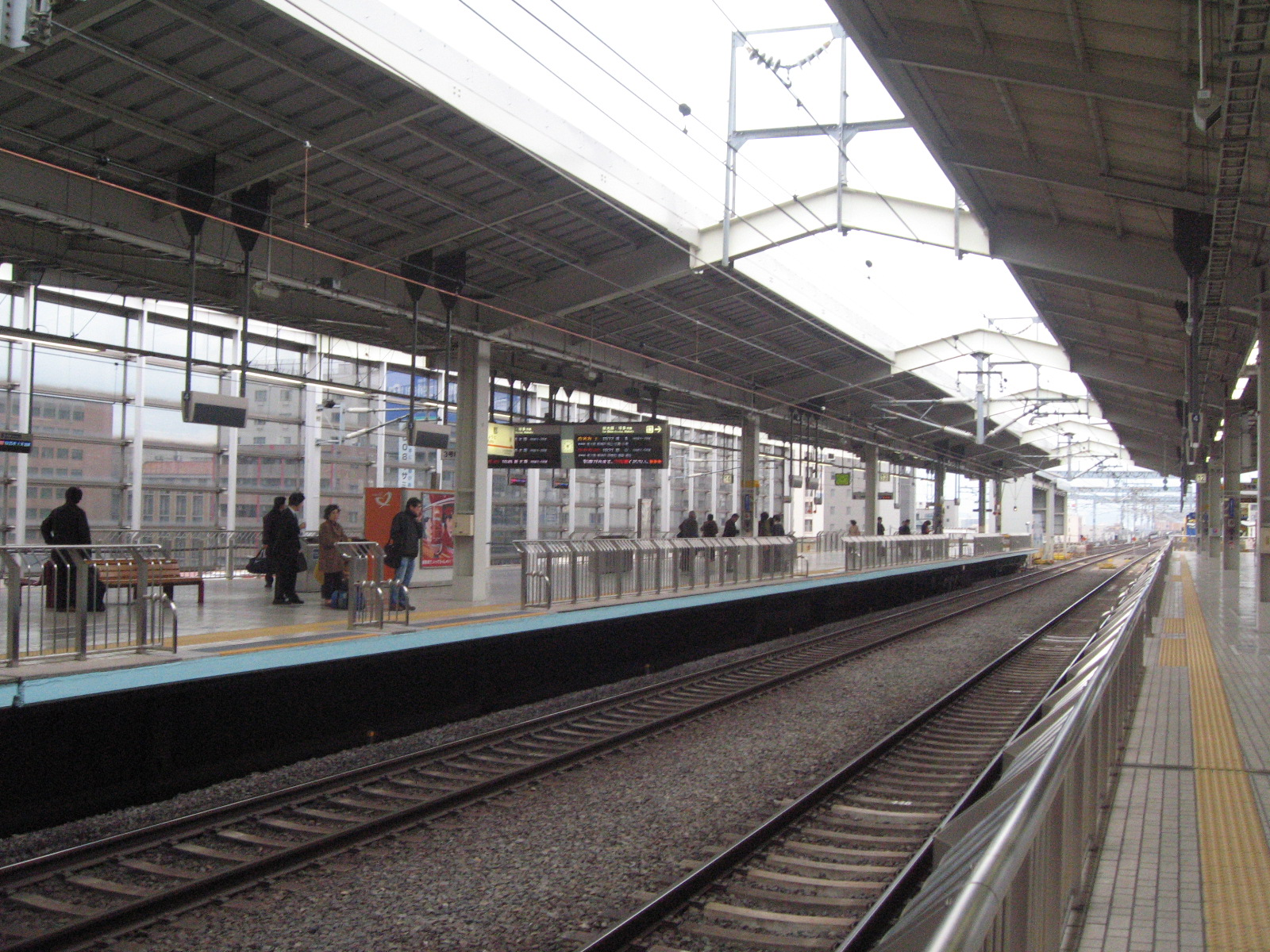
Shinkansen tracks

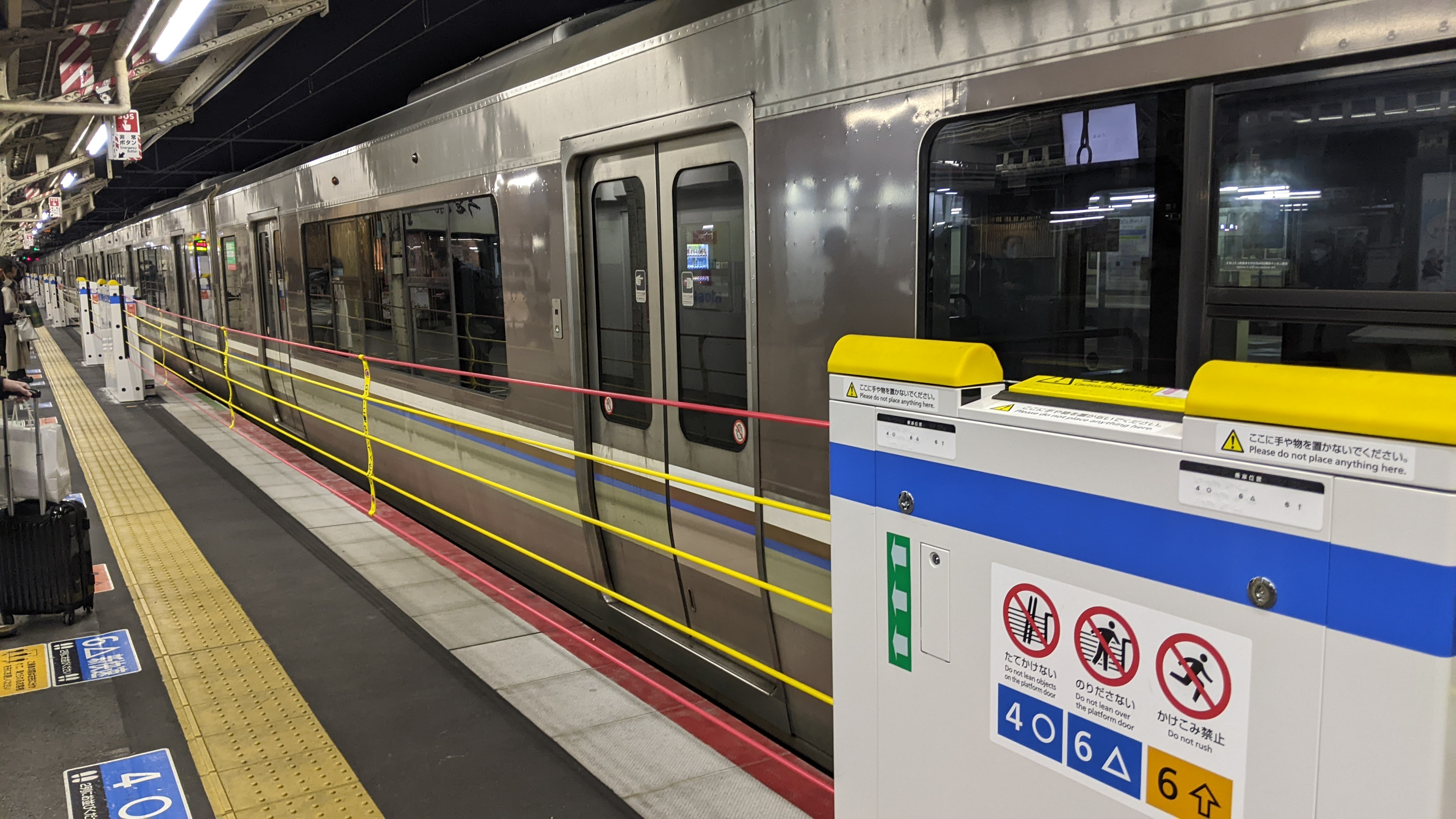
Platform No. 5 of JR Kyoto Station

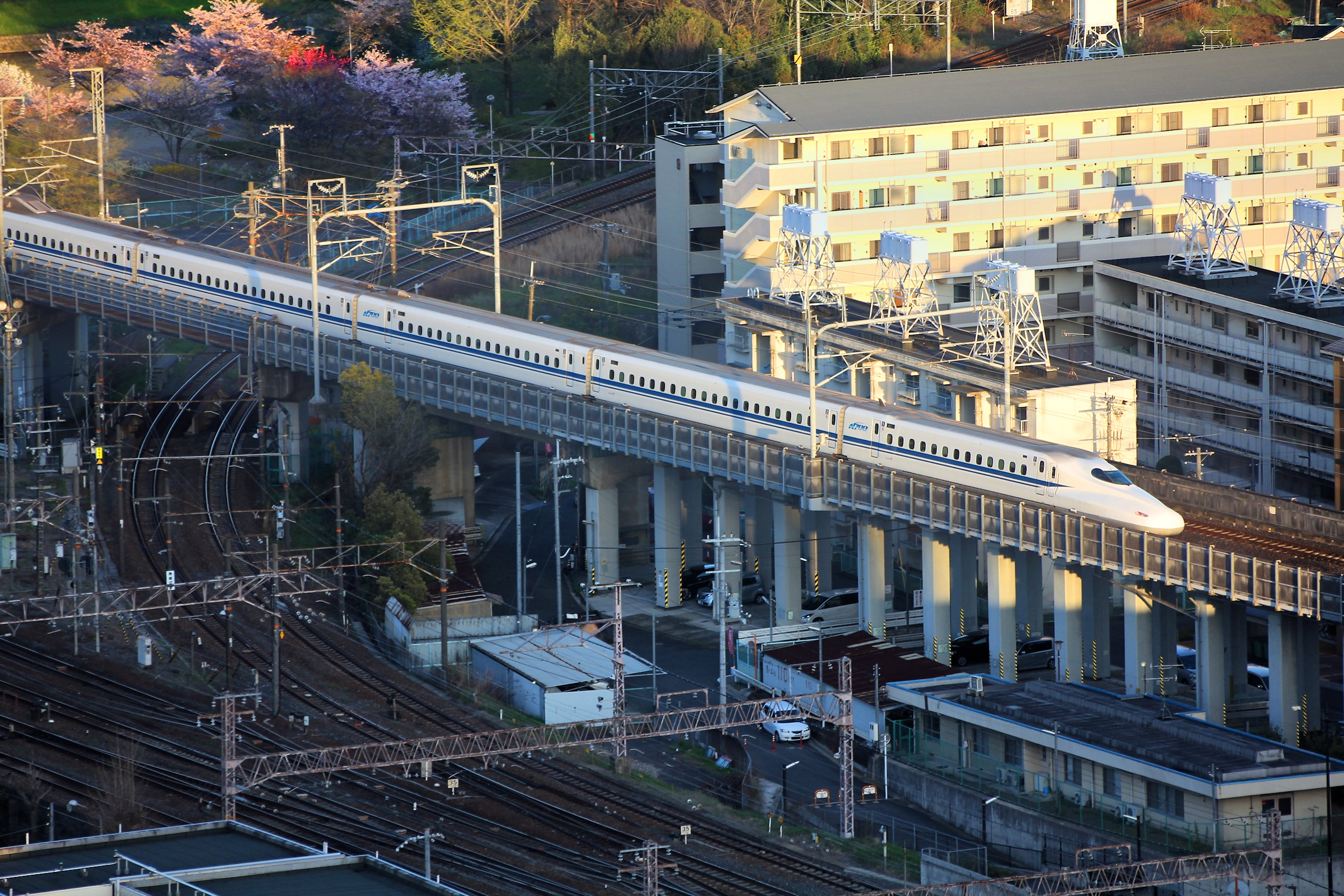
Shinkansen arriving at Kyōto Station

=== Layout ===
The station has a side platform and four island platforms serving eight tracks for the Tokaido Line (Biwako Line, JR Kyoto Line) and Kosei Line at ground level, three dead-end platforms serving four tracks for the Sanin Line (Sagano Line) to the west of platform 0 at ground level, and two dead-end platforms serving 3 tracks to the south of platform 7 at ground level. Two island platforms serving four tracks for the Shinkansen are elevated, above the platforms for the Kintetsu Kyoto Line.

0	■Hokuriku Line limited express trains	for Tsuruga and transfer to Hokuriku Shinkansen
0	■Tokaido Line, Chuo Line, Takayama Line limited express trains	for Maibara, Nagano, and Takayama
0	■Biwako Line	part of special rapid trains for Kusatsu and Maibara on weekday mornings
0	■Kosei Line	part of special rapid trains for Katata and Ōmi-Imazu on weekday mornings
0	■Kusatsu Line	for Kibukawa and Tsuge (evening, night)
2, 3	■Biwako Line	for Kusatsu and Maibara
2, 3	■Kosei Line	for Katata and Ōmi-Imazu
4, 5	■JR Kyoto Line	for Ōsaka and Sannomiya
6, 7	■Kinokuni Line limited express trains Kuroshio	for Shirahama and Shingū
6, 7	■Chizu Express Line limited express trains Super Hakuto	for Tottori and Kurayoshi
6, 7	■Kansai Airport Line limited express trains Haruka	from Maibara and Kusatsu for Kansai Airport
6, 7	■limited express trains from the Hokuriku Line, Tokaido Line	for Osaka
6, 7	■JR Kyoto Line	rapid trains and special rapid trains for Osaka and Sannomiya in the morning
8, 9, 10	■Nara Line	for Uji and Nara
30	■Kansai Airport Line limited express trains Haruka	for Kansai Airport
30	■Sagano-Sanin Line limited express trains (partly)	for Fukuchiyama, Kinosaki Onsen, Higashi-Maizuru, and Amanohashidate
31	■Sagano-Sanin Main Line limited express trains	for Fukuchiyama, Kinosaki Onsen, Higashi-Maizuru, and Amanohashidate
31	■Sagano-Sanin Line	part of trains for Kameoka, Sonobe, and Fukuchiyama
32, 33	■Sagano-Sanin Line	local trains and rapid trains for Kameoka, Sonobe, and Fukuchiyama
34	■ Disembarking only for trains at platform 33
11, 12	■Tōkaidō Shinkansen	for Nagoya and Tokyo
13, 14	■Tōkaidō Shinkansen	for Shin-Osaka and Hakata

Track layout of Kyōto Station (JR West area)
	Hachijō side (South)
	Brown (2 tracks): Nara Line to Uji and Nara
Blue (4 tracks): Tōkaidō Main Line (Biwako Line) to Maibara, Nagoya and Tokyo; Kosei Line to Omi-Imazu and Tsuruga		Black (1 track): Freight Line to Kyoto Freight Station
Blue (4 tracks): Tōkaidō Main Line (Biwako Line) to Maibara, Nagoya and Tokyo; Kosei Line to Omi-Imazu and Tsuruga		Blue (4 tracks): Tōkaidō Main Line (JR Kyōto Line) to Ōsaka and Kōbe
Blue (4 tracks): Tōkaidō Main Line (Biwako Line) to Maibara, Nagoya and Tokyo; Kosei Line to Omi-Imazu and Tsuruga		Purple (1 track): San'in Main Line (Sagano Line) to Fukuchiyama
	Karasuma Side (North)

=== Limited express trains ===
for the Hokuriku Line

- limited express Thunderbird: Osaka - Tsuruga

for the Tokaido Line, and the Takayama Line

- limited express Hida: Osaka - Takayama
- limited express Rakuraku Biwako: Osaka - Maibara

for the Sanin region via the Chizu Express Chizu Line

- limited express Super Hakuto: Kyoto - Tottori, Kurayoshi

for the Hanwa Line, Kansai Airport Line and the Kinokuni Line

- Kansai Airport limited express Haruka: Maibara, Kyoto - Kansai Airport
- limited express Kuroshio: Kyoto, Shin-Osaka - Shirahama, Shingu

for the Sanin Line, the Maizuru Line and the Kitakinki Tango Railway lines

- limited express Kinosaki: Kyoto - Fukuchiyama, Toyooka, Kinosaki Onsen
- limited express Hashidate: Kyoto - Miyazu, Amanohashidate, Toyooka
- limited express Maizuru: Kyoto - Higashi-Maizuru

=== Adjacent stations ===
«	Service	»
Tokaido Line (Biwako Line, JR Kyoto Line), Kosei Line
Terminus	West Express Ginga	Shin-Osaka (JR-A46)
Kusatsu (JR-A24)	Limited Express Hida	Shin-Osaka (JR-A46)
Terminus	Limited Express Super Hakuto	Shin-Osaka (JR-A46)
Terminus	Limited Express Kuroshio	Shin-Osaka (JR-A46)
Yamashina (JR-A30)	Limited Express Haruka	Takatsuki (JR-A38); Shin-Osaka (JR-A46)
Katata (JR-B25); Tsuruga (JR-B08)	Limited Express Thunderbird	Takatsuki (JR-A38); Shin-Osaka (JR-A46)
Yamashina (JR-A30)	Rakuraku Biwako	Shin-Osaka (JR-A46)
Yamashina (JR-A30/JR-B30)	Special Rapid	Takatsuki (JR-A38)
Yamashina (local) (JR-A30/JR-B30)	Rapid (mornings)	Nagaokakyō (JR-A35) (rapid)
Yamashina (JR-A30/JR-B30)	Local (JR Kyoto Line daytime rapid)	Nishiōji (JR-A32)
Nara Line
Terminus	Miyakoji Rapid	Tōfukuji (JR-D02)
Terminus	Rapid	Tōfukuji (JR-D02)
Terminus	Regional Rapid	Tōfukuji (JR-D02)
Terminus	Local	Tōfukuji (JR-D02)
Sagano Line (Sanin Line)
Terminus	Limited Express Kinosaki, Maizuru, Hashidate	Nijō (JR-E04)
Terminus	Rapid	Nijō (JR-E04)
Terminus	Local	Umekōji-Kyōtonishi (JR-E02)

== Kintetsu ==
Kyoto Station 京都駅
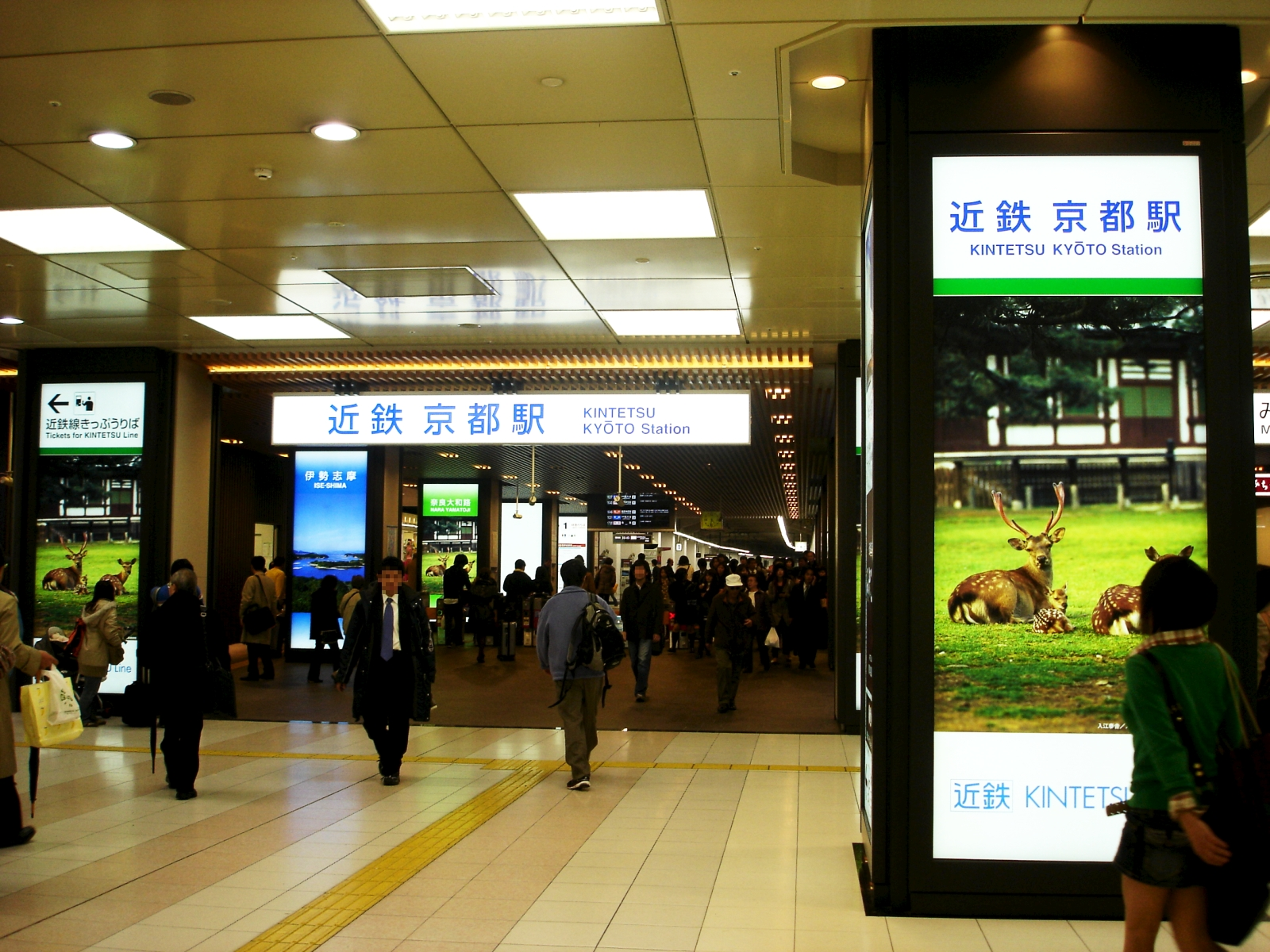

General information
- Location: 31-1 Higashi-Shiokoji Kamadonochō, Shimogyō-ku, Kyoto, Kyoto Prefecture; Japan
- Coordinates: 34°59′05″N 135°45′27.1″E
- System: Kintetsu Railway station
- Operator: Kintetsu Railway
- Lines: Kyoto/Kashihara Line; Kyoto Line

History
- Opened: 1928; 98 years ago

Passengers
- 2025: 75,771 daily

Services
Preceding station	Kintetsu Railway	Following station
Terminus	Kyoto/Kashihara Line	Tōji towards Kashiharajingū-mae
Terminus	Kyoto Line	Tōji towards Yamato-Saidaiji
Location

=== Layout ===
The station has three levels. Four dead-end platforms serving four tracks are located on the second floor. The 1st floor is a shopping street and the 3rd floor is the platforms for the Shinkansen (JR Central).

1, 2	■Limited express trains	for Nara, Kashiharajingu-mae, Ise-Shima
1～4	■Local trains and express trains	for Tambabashi, Shin-Tanabe, Yamato-Saidaiji, Nara, Tenri, Kashiharajingu-mae

=== Adjacent stations ===
«	Service	»
Kyōto Line
Terminus	Local	Tōji
Terminus	Semi-Express (only in the morning on weekdays)	Tōji
Terminus	Express	Tōji
Terminus	Limited Express	Kintetsu-Tambabashi

== Kyoto City Subway ==
K11 Kyoto Station 京都駅
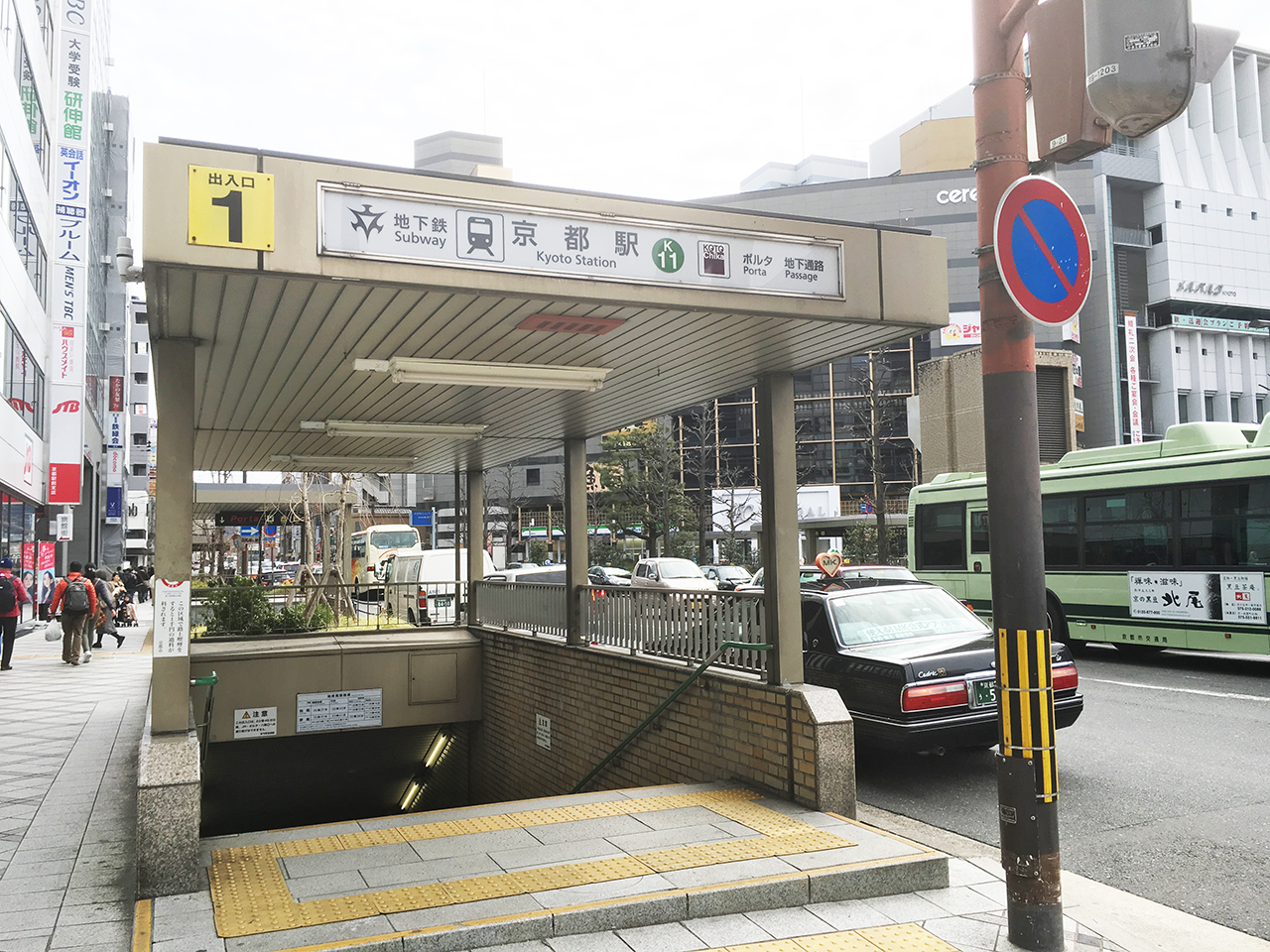
- Kyoto Subway Station Exit No.1

General information
- Location: Higashi-Shiokōji, Shimogyō-ku, Kyoto, Kyoto Prefecture; Japan
- Coordinates: 34°59′08.0″N 135°45′36.4″E
- System: Kyoto City Subway station
- Operator: Kyoto Municipal Subway
- Line: Karasuma Line
- Platforms: 1 island platform
- Tracks: 2

Construction
- Structure type: Underground

Other information
- Station code: K11

History
- Opened: 1981; 45 years ago

Passengers
- 2025: 137,042 daily

Services
Preceding station	Kyoto Municipal Subway	Following station
Kujō K12 towards Takeda	Karasuma Line	Gojō K10 towards Kokusaikaikan
Location

=== Layout ===
The station consists of one underground island platform serving two tracks.

1	■ Karasuma Line	for Takeda, Shin-Tanabe and Nara
2	■ Karasuma Line	for Shijō, Karasuma Oike, Kokusaikaikan

== History ==
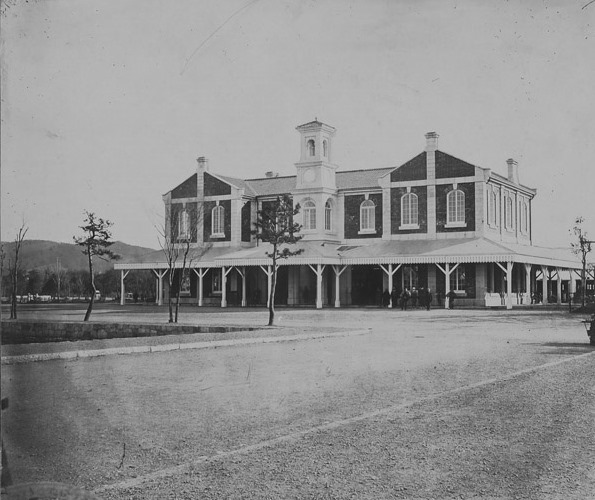
The first Kyoto Station

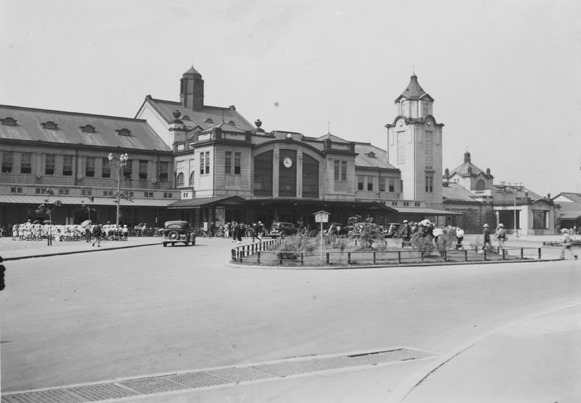
The second Kyoto Station

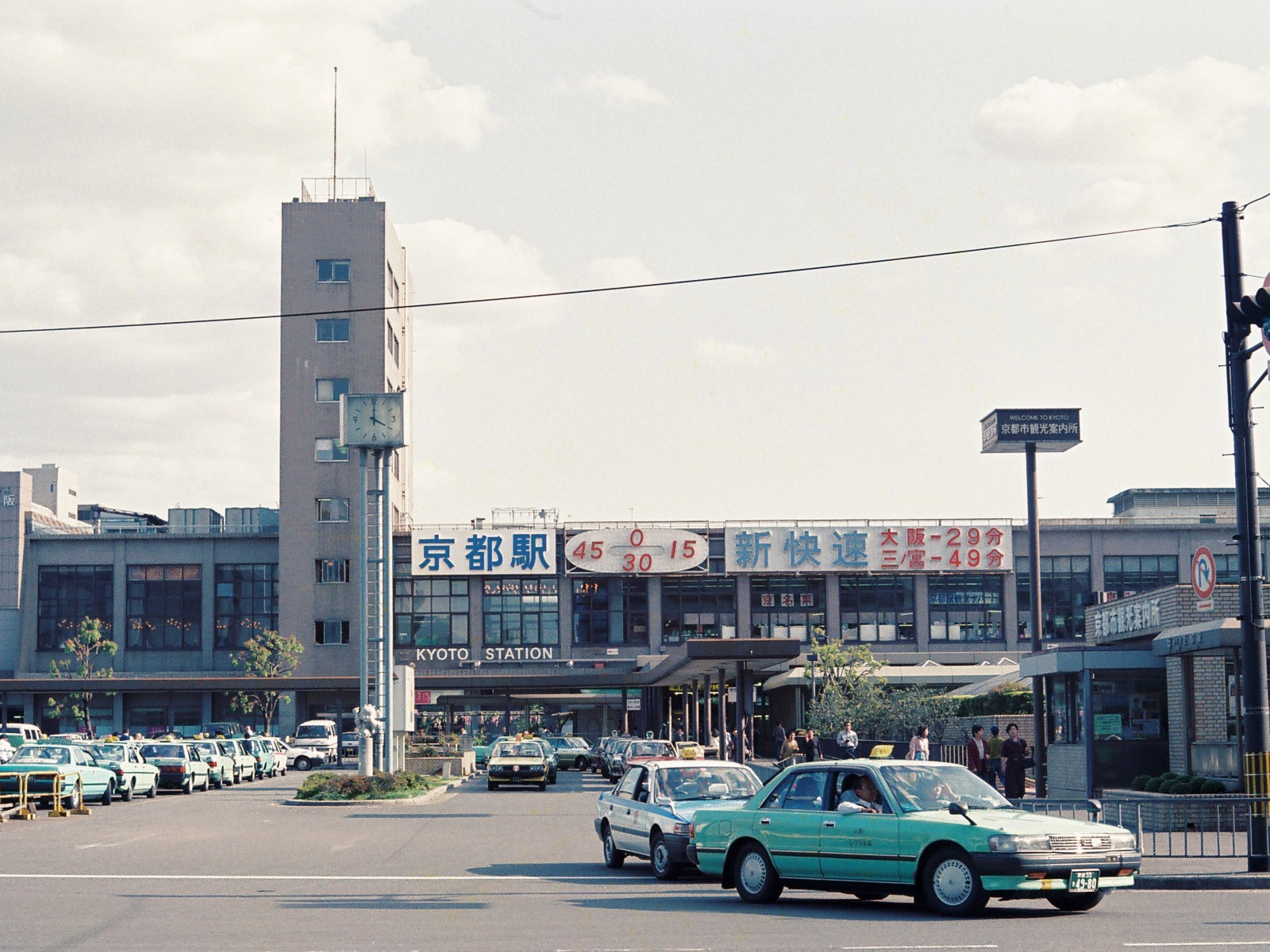
The third Kyoto Station

The governmental railway from Kobe reached Kyoto on 5 September 1876, but the station was under construction and a temporary facility called Ōmiya-dōri (Ōmiya Street) Temporary Station was used until the opening of the main station. The first Kyoto Station opened for service by decree of Emperor Meiji on 5 February 1877.

In 1889, the railway became a part of the trunk line to Tokyo (Tokaido Main Line). Subsequently, the station became the terminal of two private railways, Nara Railway (1895, present-day Nara Line) and Kyoto Railway (1897, present-day Sagano Line), that connected the station with southern and northern regions of Kyoto Prefecture, respectively.

The station was replaced by a newer, Renaissance-inspired facility in 1914, which featured a broad square (the site of demolished first station) leading from the station to Shichijō Avenue. Before and during World War II, the square was often used by imperial motorcades when Emperor Showa traveled between Kyoto and Tokyo. The station was spacious and designed to handle a large number of people, but when a few thousand people gathered to bid farewell to naval recruits on 8 January 1934, 77 people were crushed to death. This station burned to the ground in 1950, and was replaced by a more utilitarian concrete facility in 1952.

Aside from the main building on the north side of the station, the Hachijō-guchi building on the south side was built to house Tokaido Shinkansen which started operation in 1964. The underground facilities of the station, including the shopping mall Porta beneath the station square, were constructed when the subway opened in 1981.

The current Kyoto Station was designed by architect Hiroshi Hara, and it opened in 1997 which commemorated Kyoto's 1,200th anniversary. It is 70 meters high and 470 meters from east to west, with a total floor area of 238,000 square meters. Architecturally, it exhibits many characteristics of futurism, with a slightly irregular cubic façade of plate glass over a steel frame.Kyoto Station During the mid-1990s, Kyoto was one of the least modern cities in Japan by virtue of its many cultural heritage sites, so locals were largely reluctant to accept such an ambitious structure. However, the station's completion began a wave of new high-rise developments in Kyoto that culminated in the 20-story Kyocera Building.

In addition to traditional rail services, Kyoto Station also housed the Kyōto CAT (City Air Terminal), a downtown check in, baggage, and train service for some JAL flights operating out of Kansai International Airport. This service was discontinued on August 31, 2002 due to lack of ridership.

Station numbers were introduced to the JR Lines in March 2018. Kyoto Station was assigned:

- JR-A31 for the Tokaido Main Line
- JR-B31 for the Kosei Line
- JR-E01 for the San'in Main Line
- JR-D01 for the Nara Line

== Passenger statistics ==
In fiscal 2016, the JR West part of the station was used by an average of 200,426 passengers daily (boarding passengers only), making it the second busiest JR West station after Osaka. The Kyoto City Subway station was used by an average of 123,360 passengers daily (in fiscal 2016).

Annual passengers traffic by operator
Year	JR West (Boarding)	JR Central (Boarding)	Kintetsu (Total)	Subway (Total)
1908	2,255,334			
2000	60,120,000	12,101,000	43,666,000	38,422,000
2005	64,388,000	11,286,000	39,607,000	38,582,000
2010	67,056,000	11,580,000	37,818,000	38,605,000
2015	73,216,000	13,566,000	37,224,000	44,459,000

== Surrounding area ==
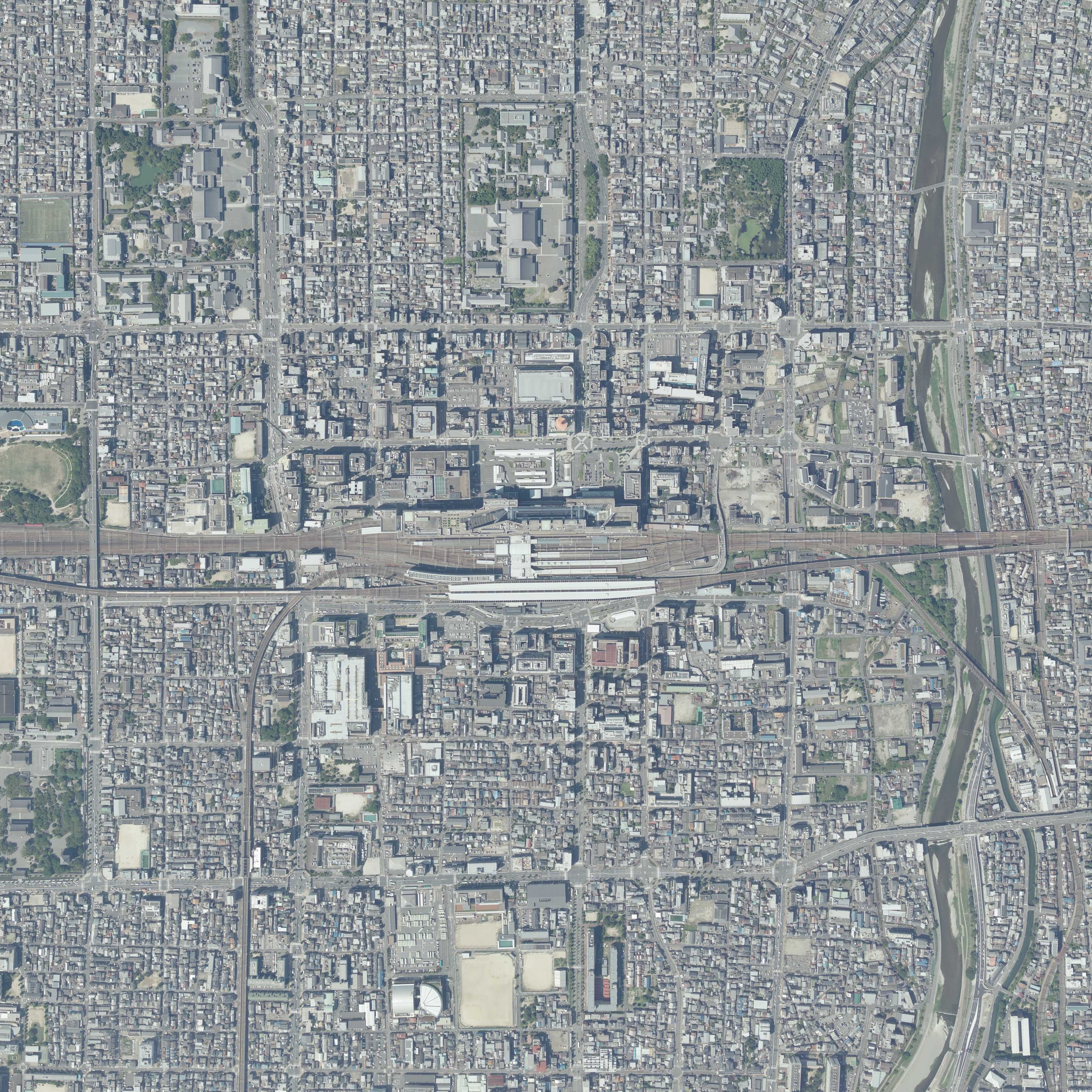
Aerial photograph

- Shichijō Station (Keihan Main Line)

=== Karasuma Gate ===
- Kyoto Station Building
  - JR Kyoto Isetan
  - Kyoto Station Shopping street "The Cube"
  - Hotel Granvia Kyoto
  - Kyoto Gekijo
  - Museum of Art "Eki" Kyoto
- Kyoto Station Underground Mall "Porta"
- Kyoto-Yodobashi
- Hotel New Hankyu Kyoto
- Kyoto Tower
- Higashi Hongan-ji
- Shimogyo-ku General Building
- Campus Plaza Kyoto
- Kyoto Central Post Office
- Omron
- Kyoto Bus Station

=== Nishinotoin Gate ===
- Bic Camera JR Kyoto Station (JR Kyoto Station NK Building)

=== Hachijo Gate ===
- Hotel Kintetsu Kyoto Station
- Kyoto Avanti
  - Hotel Keihan Kyoto
- Sightseeing Bus Terminal
- Expressway Bus Terminal
- New Miyako Hotel
- To-ji
- ÆON Mall Kyoto
- PHP Institute

== Bus terminals ==
=== Highway buses ===
==== Karasuma Gate ====
===== Karasuma Gate Bus Terminal =====
- Dream / Hiru Tokkyu; For Shinjuku Station and Tokyo Station
- Harbor Light; For Hon-Atsugi Station, Machida Station, and Yokohama Station
- Dream Saitama; For Tachikawa Station, Higashi-Yamatoshi Station, Tokorozawa Station, and Ōmiya Station (Saitama)
- Keihanshin Dream Shizuoka; For Hamamatsu Station, Kakegawa Station, Yaizu, and Shizuoka Station
- Meishin Highway Bus; For Higashiomi, Taga, Ōgaki, and Nagoya Station
- Hokurikudo Hiru Tokkyu Osaka / Hokuriku Dream Osaka; For Fukui, Komatsu, Kanazawa Station and Toyama Station
- Seishun Dream Shinshu; For Nagano Station, Sakaki, Ueda Station, Tōmi, and Sakudaira Station
- Wakasa Maizuru Express Kyoto; For Nishi-Maizuru Station, Higashi-Maizuru Station, and Obama Station
- For Miyazu Station, Amanohashidate Station, Amino Station, and Taiza
- Tsuyama Express Kyoto; For Katō, Kasai, Shisō, Mimasaka, Shōō, and Tsuyama Station
- Miyako Liner; For Fukuyama Station and Onomichi Station
- Kyoto Express; For Akaiwa, Okayama Station, and Kurashiki Station
- Sanyodo Hiru Tokkyu Hiroshima / Seishun Dream Hiroshima; For Hiroshima University, Nakasuji Station, Hiroshima Bus Center, and Hiroshima Station
- Awa Express Kyoto; For Naruto, Matsushige, and Tokushima Station
- Takamatsu Express Kyoto; For Higashikagawa, Sanuki, Miki, and Takamatsu Station (Kagawa)
- Kochi Express; For Kōchi Station, Harimayabashi Station, Kōchi University, and Susaki Station
- Izumo no Okuni / Izumo Express Kyoto; For Matsue Station, Shinji, and Izumoshi Station
- Tottori Express Kyoto; For Chizu and Tottori Station
- Yonago Express Kyoto; For Yonago Station

===== Hotel New Hankyu Kyoto bus stop =====
- Alpen Nagano; For Omi, Chikuma, and Nagano Station
- Alpen Matsumoto; For Okaya Station, Shiojiri, and Matsumoto Bus Terminal(Matsumoto Station)
- Alpen Suwa; For Okaya Station, Kami-Suwa Station, and Chino Station
- Sawayaka Shinshu; For Kamikōchi
- Okesa; For Sanjō-Tsubame, Katahigashi, and Nigata Station
- For Tonami Station, and Toyama Station
- Kyoto Osaka Liner; For Yoshida, Yaizu, Shin-Shizuoka Station, and Shimizu Station

==== Hachijo Gate ====
===== Hotel Keihan Kyoto bus stops =====
- Airport Limousine; For Kansai International Airport
- Airport Limousine; For Osaka International Airport
- Tokyo Midnight Express Kyoto; For Shibuya Station and Shinjuku Station
- For Keisei Ueno Station, Asakusa(Kaminarimon), Tokyo Skytree, Nishi-Funabashi Station, Tokyo Disney Resort, Kaihin-Makuhari Station, Chiba Station and Kamatori Station
- Moonlight; For Kokura Station, Hakata Station, and Nishitetsu Fukuoka (Tenjin) Station
- For Tsuchiyama and Kintetsu Yokkaichi Station
- For Tsuchiyama, Seki, and Tsu Station
- Kyoto Express; For Kawauchi I.C., Okaido Station, and Matsuyama City Station
- For Kōchi Station, and Harimayabashi Station

===== Hachijo-Dori Street north side (Kintetsu Bus) =====
- Arcadia; For KaminoyamaYandamagata Station
- Forest; For Sendai Station (Miyagi)
- Galaxy; For Nishigō, Sukagawa, Kōriyama Station, Nihonmatsu, and Fukushima Station
- Tochinoki; For Kuki Station, Tochigi Station, Kanuma, and Utsunomiya Station
- Seagull; For Hitachi, Takahagi Station, Isohara Station, and Iwaki Station
- Yokappe; For Tsukuba Station, Tsuchiura Station, Ishioka, and Mito Station
- Flying Liner; For Yokohama Station, Tokyo Station, Ueno Station, and Asakusa Station
- Fujiyama Liner; For Higashi-Shizuoka Station, Fuji Station, Fujinomiya Station, Taiseki-ji, Fuji-Q Highland, Kawaguchiko Station and Fujisan Station
- Kintaro; For Shin-Fuji Station, Numazu Station, Mishima Station, Gotemba Station, Shin-Matsuda Station, and Odawara Station
- Crystal Liner; For Hokuto, Nirasaki Station, Ryūō Station, and Kōfu Station
- Chikumagawa Liner; For Chikuma, Sakaki, Ueda Station, Tōmi, Sakudaira Station, and Karuizawa Station
- West Liner; For Gujō and Takayama Station
- Karst; For Ōtake, Iwakuni, Shūnan, Tokuyama Station, Hōfu Station, Yamaguchi, Mitō, and Hagi
- Shimanto Blue Liner; For Kubokawa Station, Tosa-Saga Station, Nakamura Station, and Sukumo Station
- Holland; For Ōmura, Isahaya, Nagasaki Station, and Nagasaki Shinchi Terminal
- Sunrise / Aso☆Kuma; For Kumamoto Bus Terminal and Kumamoto Station
- Ohisama; For Ebino, Kobayashi, Miyakonojō, and Miyazaki Station

===== Hachijo-Dori Street south side (Kintetsu Bus and Nankai Bus) =====
This bus stop is in front of Nippon Rent-A- Car Kyoto Station East Exit Office.

- Silk Liner; For Saitama-Shintoshin Station, Ashikagashi Station, Ōta Station, Kiryū Station, Isesaki Station, Takasaki Station, and Maebashi Station
- Southern Cross; For Akihabara Station, Yotsukaidō Station, Tomisato, Keisei Narita Station, Narita International Airport, Sawara Station, and Chōshi Station
- Dream Wakayama; For Shinjuku Station, Tokyo Station, and Shin-Kiba Station
- Let's Go; For Hashimoto Station, Akishima Station, Tachikawa Station, and Tamagawa-Jōsui Station
- Southern Cross; For Odawara Station, Fujisawa Station, Kamakura Station, Ōfuna Station, and Totsuka Station
- Southern Cross; For Nagano Station, Suzaka Station, Shinshu-Nakano Station, Iiyama Station, and Yudanaka Station
- Southern Cross; For Kashiwazaki Station, Nagaoka Station, and Higashi-Sanjō Station
- Honokuni; For Toyokawa Station and Toyohashi Station
- For Yao Station and Kyūhōji Station
- Shirahama Blue Sky; For Inami, Haya Station, Kii-Tanabe Station, and Shirahama
- SORIN; For Nakatsu Station, Usa, Beppu, and Ōita Station

===== Hachijo-Dori Street south side (Osaka Bus) =====
- Kyoto Tokkyu New Star; For Nagata Station and Fuse Station
- Tokyo Tokkyu New Star; For Tokyo Station, Akihabara Station, and Ōji Station

== In media ==
- In Gamera 3: Revenge of Iris, the final battle takes place in Kyoto Station.
- Parts of the 2003 film Lost in Translation were filmed on Kyoto Station's Shinkansen platforms.
- The Kyoto level featured in Tony Hawk's Underground 2: Remix and Tony Hawk's American Wasteland is set in Kyoto Station and the surrounding area.

== See also ==
- List of railway stations in Japan
