= List of railway stations in Japan: O =

List of railway stations in Japan

| A | B | C | D | E | F | G | H | I | J | KL | M | N | O | P | R | S | T | U | W | Y | Z |

This list shows the railway stations in Japan that begin with the letter O. This is a subset of the full list of railway stations in Japan.

== Station list ==
=== Oa - Of ===
| Ōada Station | 大阿太駅 （おおあだ） |
| Ōami Station | 大網駅 （おおあみ） |
| Ōarai Station | 大洗駅 （おおあらい） |
| Ōasa Station | 大麻駅 （おおあさ） |
| Ōasō Station | 大麻生駅 （おおあそう） |
| Ōbaku Station (Keihan) | 黄檗駅 (京阪) （おうばく） |
| Ōbaku Station (JR West) | 黄檗駅 (JR西日本) （おうばく） |
| Obama Station | 小浜駅 （おばま） |
| Ōbaneen Station | 大羽根園駅 （おおばねえん） |
| Obara Station | 小原駅 （おばら） |
| Ōbara Station | 大原駅 (広島県) （おおばら） |
| Ōbarino Station | 大張野駅 （おおばりの） |
| Obase-Nishikōdai-mae Station | 小波瀬西工大前駅 （おばせにしこうだいまえ） |
| Obasute Station | 姨捨駅 （おばすて） |
| Obata Station (Aichi) | 小幡駅 （おばた） |
| Obata Station (Mie) | 小俣駅 (三重県) （おばた） |
| Ōbatake Station | 大畠駅 （おおばたけ） |
| Obataryokuchi Station | 小幡緑地駅 （おばたりょくち） |
| Obayashi Station | 小林駅 (兵庫県) （おばやし） |
| Obi Station | 飫肥駅 （おび） |
| Obihiro Station | 帯広駅 （おびひろ） |
| Obiori Station | 帯織駅 （おびおり） |
| Obitoke Station | 帯解駅 （おびとけ） |
| Obitsu Station | 小櫃駅 （おびつ） |
| Ōboke Station | 大歩危駅 （おおぼけ） |
| Oboro Station | 尾幌駅 （おぼろ） |
| Ōbu Station | 大府駅 （おおぶ） |
| Ōbuke Station | 大更駅 （おおぶけ） |
| Ōbukuro Station | 大袋駅 （おおぶくろ） |
| Obuse Station | 小布施駅 （おぶせ） |
| Obusuma Station | 男衾駅 （おぶすま） |
| Ochanomizu Station | 御茶ノ水駅 （おちゃのみず） |
| Ōchi Station | 相知駅 （おうち） |
| Ochiai Station (Hokkaido) | 落合駅 (北海道) （おちあい） |
| Ochiai Station (Tokyo) | 落合駅 (東京都) （おちあい） |
| Ochiaigawa Station | 落合川駅 （おちあいがわ） |
| Ochiai-Minaminagasaki Station | 落合南長崎駅 （おちあいみなみながさき） |
| Ochii Station | 落居駅 （おちい） |
| Ochiishi Station | 落石駅 （おちいし） |
| Ōda Station (Kumamoto) | 網田駅 （おうだ） |
| Ōda Station (Mie) | 麻生田駅 （おうだ） |
| Oda Station (Okayama) | 小田駅 (岡山県) （おだ） |
| Oda Station (Shimane) | 小田駅 (島根県) （おだ） |
| Odabuchi Station | 小田渕駅 （おだぶち） |
| Odai Station | 小台駅 （おだい） |
| Ōdai Station | 大平駅 （おおだい） |
| Odaiba-kaihinkōen Station | お台場海浜公園駅 （おだいばかいひんこうえん） |
| Ōdaka Station | 大高駅 （おおだか） |
| Odaka Station | 小高駅 （おだか） |
| Odakyū Nagayama Station | 小田急永山駅 （おだきゅうながやま） |
| Odakyū Sagamihara Station | 小田急相模原駅 （おだきゅうさがみはら） |
| Odakyū Tama Center Station | 小田急多摩センター駅 （おだきゅうたませんたー） |
| Ōdara Station | 大多羅駅 （おおだら） |
| Odasakae Station | 小田栄駅 (おださかえ) |
| Ōdashi Station | 大田市駅 （おおだし） |
| Ōdate Station | 大館駅 （おおだて） |
| Odawara Station | 小田原駅 （おだわら） |
| Ōdomari Station | 大泊駅 （おおどまり） |
| Ōdomi Station | 大富駅 （おおどみ） |
| Ōdōri Station | 大通駅 （おおどおり） |
| Odoriba Station | 踊場駅 （おどりば） |
| Ōdoro Station | 大土呂駅 （おおどろ） |
| Ōdose Station | 大戸瀬駅 （おおどせ） |
| Ōdōtsu Station | 大堂津駅 （おおどうつ） |
| Oe Station | 小江駅 （おえ） |
| Ōe Station (Aichi) | 大江駅 (愛知県) （おおえ） |
| Ōe Station (Kyoto) | 大江駅 (京都府) （おおえ） |
| Ōebashi Station | 大江橋駅 （おおえばし） |
| Ōe-Yamaguchi-naiku Station | 大江山口内宮駅 （おおえやまぐちないく） |
| Ōe-kōkōmae Station | 大江高校前駅 （おおえこうこうまえ） |
| Oezuka Station | 麻植塚駅 （おえづか） |
| Ofuku Station | 於福駅 （おふく） |
| Ōfuna Station | 大船駅 （おおふな） |
| Ōfunato Station | 大船渡駅 （おおふなと） |

=== Og - Oj ===
| Oga Station | 男鹿駅 （おが） |
| Ōga Station | 大神駅 （おおが） |
| Ōgaki Station | 大垣駅 （おおがき） |
| Ogakie Station | 小垣江駅 （おがきえ） |
| Ōgane Station | 大金駅 （おおがね） |
| Ogase Station | 苧ヶ瀬駅 （おがせ） |
| Ogata Station (Oita) | 緒方駅 （おがた） |
| Ōgata Station | 大形駅 （おおがた） |
| Ogawa Station (Kumamoto) | 小川駅 (熊本県) （おがわ） |
| Ogawa Station (Tokyo) | 小川駅 (東京都) （おがわ） |
| Ogawa Station (Aichi) | 緒川駅 （おがわ） |
| Ogawagō Station | 小川郷駅 （おがわごう） |
| Ogawakōkō-shita Station | 小川高校下駅 （おがわこうこうした） |
| Ogawamachi Station (Saitama) | 小川町駅 (埼玉県) （おがわまち） |
| Ogawamachi Station (Tokyo) | 小川町駅 (東京都) （おがわまち） |
| Ōgawara Station | 大河原駅 (宮城県) （おおがわら） |
| Ogi Station | 小城駅 （おぎ） |
| Ōgi Station (Hyōgo) | 青木駅 （おおぎ） |
| Ōgi Station (Saga) | 大木駅 （おおぎ） |
| Ogifushi Station | 荻伏駅 （おぎふし） |
| Ogikawa Station | 荻川駅 （おぎかわ） |
| Ogikubo Station | 荻窪駅 （おぎくぼ） |
| Ōgimachi Station (Kanagawa) | 扇町駅 (神奈川県) （おうぎまち） |
| Ōgimachi Station (Osaka) | 扇町駅 (大阪府) （おうぎまち） |
| Ogino Station (Fukushima) | 荻野駅 （おぎの） |
| Ogino Station (Toyama) | 荻布駅 （おぎの） |
| Oginojō Station | 小木ノ城駅 （おぎのじょう） |
| Ōgi-ōhashi Station | 扇大橋駅 （おうぎおおはし） |
| Ōgita Station | 扇田駅 （おうぎた） |
| Ogitsu Station | 小木津駅 （おぎつ） |
| Ōgo Station | 大胡駅 （おおご） |
| Ōgoe Station | 大越駅 （おおごえ） |
| Ogōri Station | 小郡駅 （おごおり） |
| Ogose Station | 越生駅 （おごせ） |
| Ogoso Station | 小古曽駅 （おごそ） |
| Ogoto-onsen Station | 雄琴温泉駅 （おごとおんせん） |
| Ōguchi Station | 大口駅 （おおぐち） |
| Oguni Station | 小国駅 (おぐに) |
| Ogura Station | 小倉駅 (京都府) （おぐら） |
| Oguradai Station | 小倉台駅 （おぐらだい） |
| Ogushigō Station | 小串郷駅 （おぐしごう） |
| Ogyū Station | 荻生駅 （おぎゅう） |
| Ohanabatake Station | 御花畑駅 （おはなばたけ） |
| Ohanajaya Station | お花茶屋駅 （おはなぢゃや） |
| Ōhara Station (Chiba) | 大原駅 (千葉県) （おおはら） |
| Ōhara Station (Okayama) | 大原駅 (岡山県) （おおはら） |
| Ōhashi Station | 大橋駅 (福岡県) （おおはし） |
| Ōhiradai Station | 大平台駅 （おおひらだい） |
| Ōhirashita Station | 大平下駅 （おおひらした） |
| Ōhito Station | 大仁駅 （おおひと） |
| Ōho Station | 大保駅 （おおほ） |
| Ōhori Station | 大堀駅 （おおほり） |
| Ōhorikōen Station | 大濠公園駅 （おおほりこうえん） |
| Ōichi Station | 太市駅 （おおいち） |
| Oikawa Station | 笈川駅 （おいかわ） |
| Ōi Keibajō Mae Station | 大井競馬場前駅 （おおいけいばじょうまえ） |
| Ōike Ikoinomori Station | 大池いこいの森駅 （おおいけいこいのもり） |
| Oikeyūen Station | 大池遊園駅 （おいけゆうえん） |
| Ōimachi Station | 大井町駅 （おおいまち） |
| Oirase Station | 追良瀬駅 （おいらせ） |
| Ōishi Station | 大石駅 （おおいし） |
| Ōishida Station | 大石田駅 （おおいしだ） |
| Ōiso Station | 大磯駅 （おおいそ） |
| Ōita Station | 大分駅 （おおいた） |
| Ōita-daigaku-mae Station | 大分大学前駅 （おおいただいがくまえ） |
| Ōitai Station | 大板井駅 （おおいたい） |
| Oitama Station | 置賜駅 （おいたま） |
| Oitsu Station | 老津駅 （おいつ） |
| Ōiwa Station | 大岩駅 （おおいわ） |
| Oiwake Station (Akita) | 追分駅 (秋田県) （おいわけ） |
| Oiwake Station (Hokkaido) | 追分駅 (北海道) （おいわけ） |
| Oiwake Station (Mie) | 追分駅 (三重県) （おいわけ） |
| Oiwake Station (Shiga) | 追分駅 (滋賀県) （おいわけ） |
| Oiwakeguchi Station | 追分口駅 （おいわけぐち） |
| Ōizumi Station (Fukushima) | 大泉駅 (福島県) （おおいずみ） |
| Ōizumi Station (Mie) | 大泉駅 (三重県) （おおいずみ） |
| Ōizumi Station (Toyama) | 大泉駅 (富山県) （おおいずみ） |
| Ōizumigakuen Station | 大泉学園駅 （おおいずみがくえん） |
| Ōja Station | 大蛇駅 （おおじゃ） |
| Ōji Station (Nara) | 王寺駅 （おうじ） |
| Ōji Station (Tokyo) | 王子駅 （おうじ） |
| Ōji-Kamiya Station | 王子神谷駅 （おうじかみや） |
| Ojikakōgen Station | 男鹿高原駅 （おじかこうげん） |
| Ōjikōen Station | 王子公園駅 （おうじこうえん） |
| Ōjima Station | 大島駅 (東京都) （おおじま） |
| Ojimaya Station | 小島谷駅 （おじまや） |
| Ojiya Station | 小千谷駅 （おぢや） |

=== Ok - Or ===
| Oka Station | 岡駅 （おか） |
| Ōka Station | 相可駅 （おうか） |
| Okaba Station | 岡場駅 （おかば） |
| Okabana Station | 岡花駅 （おかばな） |
| Okabe Station | 岡部駅 （おかべ） |
| Okachimachi Station | 御徒町駅 （おかちまち） |
| Okada Station (Ehime) | 岡田駅 (愛媛県) （おかだ） |
| Okada Station (Kagawa) | 岡田駅 (香川県) （おかだ） |
| Okadaura Station | 岡田浦駅 （おかだうら） |
| Okadera Station | 岡寺駅 （おかでら） |
| Okadomekōfuku Station | おかどめ幸福駅 （おかどめこうふく） |
| Ōkaidō Station | 大街道駅 （おおかいどう） |
| Okaji Station | 岡地駅 (天竜浜名湖鉄道) （おかじ） |
| Ōkama Station | 大釜駅 （おおかま） |
| Okamachi Station | 岡町駅 （おかまち） |
| Okami Station | 岡見駅 （おかみ） |
| Okamoto Station (Hyogo) | 岡本駅 (兵庫県) （おかもと） |
| Okamoto Station (Kagawa) | 岡本駅 (香川県) （おかもと） |
| Okamoto Station (Tochigi) | 岡本駅 (栃木県) （おかもと） |
| Ōkaribe Station | 大狩部駅 （おおかりべ） |
| Okashinai Station | 笑内駅 （おかしない） |
| Ōkawa Dam kōen Station | 大川ダム公園駅 （おおかわだむこうえん） |
| Ōkawa Station | 大川駅 （おおかわ） |
| Ōkawachi Station | 大河内駅 （おおかわち） |
| Ōkawadai Station | 大川平駅 （おおかわだい） |
| Ōkawano Station | 大川野駅 （おおかわの） |
| Ōkawara Station | 大河原駅 (京都府) （おおかわら） |
| Okaya Station | 岡谷駅 （おかや） |
| Okayama Station | 岡山駅 （おかやま） |
| Okayamaekimae Station | 岡山駅前駅 （おかやまえきまえ） |
| Okazaki Station | 岡崎駅 （おかざき） |
| Okazakikōenmae Station | 岡崎公園前駅 （おかざきこうえんまえ） |
| Okazakimae Station | 岡崎前駅 （おかざきまえ） |
| Okegawa Station | 桶川駅 （おけがわ） |
| Ōki Station | 大城駅 （おおき） |
| Oki-Matsushima Station | 沖松島駅 （おきまつしま） |
| Okinashima Station | 翁島駅 （おきなしま） |
| Ōkishi Station | 大岸駅 （おおきし） |
| Okitsu Station | 興津駅 （おきつ） |
| Okkawa Station | 乙川駅 （おっかわ） |
| Okoba Station | 大畑駅 （おこば） |
| Okobata Station | 大河端駅 （おこばた） |
| Oku Station (Okayama) | 邑久駅 （おく） |
| Oku Station (Tokyo) | 尾久駅 （おく） |
| Okuani Station | 奥阿仁駅 （おくあに） |
| Ōkubo Station (Akita) | 大久保駅 (秋田県) （おおくぼ） |
| Ōkubo Station (Hyogo) | 大久保駅 (兵庫県) （おおくぼ） |
| Ōkubo Station (Kyoto) | 大久保駅 (京都府) （おおくぼ） |
| Ōkubo Station (Tokyo) | 大久保駅 (東京都) （おおくぼ） |
| Okuchō Station | 奥町駅 （おくちょう） |
| Okuda Station | 奥田駅 （おくだ） |
| Okudōkai Station | 奥洞海駅 （おくどうかい） |
| Okuhamanako Station | 奥浜名湖駅 （おくはまなこ） |
| Okuizumi Station | 奥泉駅 （おくいずみ） |
| Ōkuki Station | 大久喜駅 （おおくき） |
| Ōkuma Station | 逢隈駅 （おおくま） |
| Okunai Station | 奥内駅 （おくない） |
| Okunakayama-Kōgen Station | 奥中山高原駅 （おくなかやまこうげん） |
| Oku-Nikkawa Station | 奥新川駅 （おくにっかわ） |
| Okunoyahama Station | 奥野谷浜駅 （おくのやはま） |
| Okuōikojō Station | 奥大井湖上駅 （おくおおいこじょう） |
| Ōkuradani Station | 大蔵谷駅 （おおくらだに） |
| Ōkurayama Station (Hyogo) | 大倉山駅 (兵庫県) （おおくらやま） |
| Ōkurayama Station (Kanagawa) | 大倉山駅 (神奈川県) （おおくらやま） |
| Ōkusa Station | 大草駅 （おおくさ） |
| Okusawa Station | 奥沢駅 （おくさわ） |
| Oku-Tama Station | 奥多摩駅 （おくたま） |
| Okutsugaru-Imabetsu Station | 奥津軽いまべつ駅 （おくつがるいまべつ） |
| Ōkuwa Station (Nagano) | 大桑駅 (長野県) （おおくわ） |
| Ōkuwa Station (Tochigi) | 大桑駅 (栃木県) （おおくわ） |
| Ōma Station | 大間駅 （おおま） |
| Ōmachi Station (Chiba) | 大町駅 (千葉県) （おおまち） |
| Ōmachi Station (Hiroshima) | 大町駅 (広島県) （おおまち） |
| Ōmachi Station (Astram Line) | 大町駅 (広島県) （おおまち） |
| Ōmachi Station (Kagawa) | 大町駅 (香川県) （おおまち） |
| Ōmachi Station (Saga) | 大町駅 (佐賀県) （おおまち） |
| Ōmachi Station (Toyama) | 大町停留場 (富山県) （おおまち） |
| Omachi Nishi-koen Station | 大町西公園駅 （おおまちにしこうえん） |
| Ōmae Station | 大前駅 （おおまえ） |
| Omaeda Station | 小前田駅 （おまえだ） |
| Ōmagari Station (Akita) | 大曲駅 (秋田県) （おおまがり） |
| Ōmagari Station (Aomori) | 大曲駅 (青森県) （おおまがり） |
| Ōmagoshi Station | 大間越駅 （おおまごし） |
| Ōmama Station | 大間々駅 （おおまま） |
| Omata Station | 小俣駅 (栃木県) （おまた） |
| Omatsu Station | 尾松駅 （おまつ） |
| Ombara Station | 乙原駅 (島根県) （おんばら） |
| Ombetsu Station | 音別駅 （おんべつ） |
| Ōme Station | 青梅駅 （おうめ） |
| Ōmekaidō Station | 青梅街道駅 （おうめかいどう） |
| Ōmi Station (Niigata) | 青海駅 (新潟県) （おうみ） |
| Ōmi Station (Aichi) | 大海駅 （おおみ） |
| Ōmika Station | 大甕駅 （おおみか） |
| Ōminato Station | 大湊駅 （おおみなと） |
| Ōmisaki Station | 大三東駅 （おおみさき） |
| Ōmi-Hachiman Station | 近江八幡駅 （おうみはちまん） |
| Ōmi-Imazu Station | 近江今津駅 （おうみいまづ） |
| Ōmi-Maiko Station | 近江舞子駅 （おうみまいこ） |
| Ōmi-Nagaoka Station | 近江長岡駅 （おうみながおか） |
| Ōmi-Nakashō Station | 近江中庄駅 （おうみなかしょう） |
| Ōmi-Shiotsu Station | 近江塩津駅 （おうみしおつ） |
| Ōmi-Takashima Station | 近江高島駅 （おうみたかしま） |
| Omigawa Station | 小見川駅 （おみがわ） |
| Ōmigawa Station | 青海川駅 （おうみがわ） |
| Ōmijingūmae Station | 近江神宮前駅 （おうみじんぐうまえ） |
| Ōmitsu Station | 大三駅 （おおみつ） |
| Ōmiya Station (Kyoto) | 大宮駅 (京都府) （おおみや） |
| Ōmiya Station (Saitama) | 大宮駅 (埼玉県) （おおみや） |
| Ōmiyakōen Station | 大宮公園駅 （おおみやこうえん） |
| Ōmizo Station | 大溝駅 （おおみぞ） |
| Omochanomachi Station | おもちゃのまち駅 |
| Omoigawa Station | 思川駅 （おもいがわ） |
| Omokagebashi Station | 面影橋駅 （おもかげばし） |
| Omori Station (Shizuoka) | 尾盛駅 （おもり） |
| Ōmori Station (Shizuoka) | 大森駅 (静岡県) （おおもり） |
| Ōmori Station (Tokyo) | 大森駅 (東京都) （おおもり） |
| Ōmori-Kinjōgakuin-mae Station | 大森・金城学院前駅 （おおもり・きんじょうがくいんまえ） |
| Ōmoridai Station | 大森台駅 （おおもりだい） |
| Ōmorikaigan Station | 大森海岸駅 （おおもりかいがん） |
| Ōmorimachi Station | 大森町駅 （おおもりまち） |
| Omoromachi Station | おもろまち駅 |
| Omoshiroyama-Kōgen Station | 面白山高原駅 （おもしろやまこうげん） |
| Omotesandō Station | 表参道駅 （おもてさんどう） |
| Ōmoto Station | 大元駅 （おおもと） |
| Ōmura Station (Hyogo) | 大村駅 (兵庫県) （おおむら） |
| Ōmura Station (Nagasaki) | 大村駅 (長崎県) （おおむら） |
| Omurai Station | 小村井駅 （おむらい） |
| Omurajinjamae Station | 小村神社前駅 （おむらじんじゃまえ） |
| Ōmura Rail Yard Station | 大村車両基地駅 （おおむらしゃりょうきち） |
| Omuro-Ninnaji Station | 御室仁和寺駅 （おむろにんなじ） |
| Ōmuta Station | 大牟田駅 （おおむた） |
| Ona Station | 尾奈駅 （おな） |
| Onagawa Station | 女川駅 （おながわ） |
| Onahama Station | 小名浜駅 （おなはま） |
| Ōnaka Station | 大中駅 （おおなか） |
| Ōnakayama Station | 大中山駅 （おおなかやま） |
| Onarimon Station | 御成門駅 （おなりもん） |
| Onda Station | 恩田駅 （おんだ） |
| Ongagawa Station | 遠賀川駅 （おんががわ） |
| Ongano Station | 遠賀野駅 （おんがの） |
| Onigase Station | 鬼瀬駅 （おにがせ） |
| Onigoe Station | 鬼越駅 （おにごえ） |
| Ōnishi Station | 大西駅 （おおにし） |
| Ōniwa Station | 大庭駅 （おおにわ） |
| Onizuka Station | 鬼塚駅 （おにづか） |
| Onji Station | 恩智駅 （おんぢ） |
| Onjuku Station | 御宿駅 （おんじゅく） |
| Onnenai Station | 恩根内駅 （おんねない） |
| Ōno Station (Fukushima) | 大野駅 （おおの） |
| Ono Station (Hyogo) | 小野駅 (兵庫県) （おの） |
| Ono Station (Kyoto) | 小野駅 (京都府) （おの） |
| Ono Station (Nagano) | 小野駅 (長野県) （おの） |
| Ono Station (Nagasaki) | 小野駅 (長崎県) （おの） |
| Ono Station (Shiga) | 小野駅 (滋賀県) （おの） |
| Onobori Station | 尾登駅 （おのぼり） |
| Onoda Station | 小野田駅 （おのだ） |
| Ōnodai Station | 大野台駅 （おおのだい） |
| Onodakō Station | 小野田港駅 （おのだこう） |
| Onoekōkōmae Station | 尾上高校前駅 （おのえこうこうまえ） |
| Onoenomatsu Station | 尾上の松駅 （おのえのまつ） |
| Onogami Station | 小野上駅 （おのがみ） |
| Onogamionsen Station | 小野上温泉駅 （おのがみおんせん） |
| Ōnogō Station | 多ノ郷駅 （おおのごう） |
| Ōnohara Station | 大野原駅 （おおのはら） |
| Ōnojō Station | 大野城駅 （おおのじょう） |
| Onomachi Station | 小野町駅 （おのまち） |
| Ōnomachi Station | 大野町駅 （おおのまち） |
| Onomichi Station | 尾道駅 （おのみち） |
| Ononiimachi Station | 小野新町駅 （おのにいまち） |
| Ōnori Station | 大乗駅 （おおのり） |
| Ōnoshimo Station | 大野下駅 （おおのしも） |
| Ōnoura Station | 大野浦駅 （おおのうら） |
| Onoya Station | 小野屋駅 （おのや） |
| Onoyama Park Station | 奥武山公園駅 （おうのやまこうえん） |
| Ontakesan Station | 御嶽山駅 （おんたけさん） |
| Onuka Station | 小奴可駅 （おぬか） |
| Ōnuki Station | 大貫駅 （おおぬき） |
| Ōnuma Station | 大沼駅 （おおぬま） |
| Ōnumakōen Station | 大沼公園駅 （おおぬまこうえん） |
| Ōoka Station (Miyagi) | 大岡駅 (宮城県) （おおおか） |
| Ōoka Station (Shizuoka) | 大岡駅 (静岡県) （おおおか） |
| Ōokashōmae Station | 大岡小前駅 （おおおかしょうまえ） |
| Ōokayama Station | 大岡山駅 （おおおかやま） |
| Oppama Station | 追浜駅 （おっぱま） |
| Orange Town Station | オレンジタウン駅 |
| Oribe Station | 織部駅 （おりべ） |
| Origuchi Station | 折口駅 （おりぐち） |
| Orihara Station | 折原駅 （おりはら） |
| Orihata Station | おりはた駅 (おりはた) |
| Orii Station | 折居駅 （おりい） |
| Orikabe Station | 折壁駅 （おりかべ） |
| Orikasa Station | 織笠駅 （おりかさ） |
| Orimoto Station | 折本駅 （おりもと） |
| Orio Station | 折尾駅 （おりお） |
| Oritate Station | 下立駅 （おりたて） |
| Oritateguchi Station | 下立口駅 （おりたてぐち） |
| Oriwatari Station | 折渡駅 （おりわたり） |
| Oroku Station | 小禄駅 （おろく） |
| Oroshimachi Station (Fukushima) | 卸町駅 (福島県) （おろしまち） |
| Oroshimachi Station (Miyagi) | 卸町駅 (宮城県) （おろしまち） |
| Oryūzako Station | 折生迫駅 （おりゅうざこ） |

=== Os - Oz ===
| Osa Station | 長駅 （おさ） |
| Osafune Station | 長船駅 （おさふね） |
| Osaka Station | 大阪駅 （おおさか） |
| Ōsaka Abenobashi Station | 大阪阿部野橋駅 （おおさかあべのばし） |
| Osaka Airport Station | 大阪空港駅 （おおさかくうこう） |
| Osakabe Station | 刑部駅 （おさかべ） |
| Osaka Business Park Station | 大阪ビジネスパーク駅 （おおさかびじねすぱーく） |
| Osaka Freight Terminal Station | 大阪貨物ターミナル駅 （おおさかかもつたーみなる） |
| Ōsakajō-kitazume Station | 大阪城北詰駅 （おおさかじょうきたづめ） |
| Osakajōkōen Station | 大阪城公園駅 （おおさかじょうこうえん） |
| Ōsakakō Station | 大阪港駅 （おおさかこう） |
| Ōsaka-Kyōikudai-mae Station | 大阪教育大前駅 （おおさかきょういくだいまえ） |
| Ōsaka Namba Station | 大阪難波駅 （おおさかなんば） |
| Ōsakasayamashi Station | 大阪狭山市駅 （おおさかさやまし） |
| Ōsaka-Temmangū Station | 大阪天満宮駅 （おおさかてんまんぐう） |
| Ōsaka Uehommachi Station | 大阪上本町駅 （おおさかうえほんまち） |
| Osaka-Umeda Station | 大阪梅田駅 （おおさかうめだ） |
| Ōsaki Station | 大崎駅 （おおさき） |
| Ōsaki-Hirokōji Station | 大崎広小路駅 （おおさきひろこうじ） |
| Ōsakura Station | 大佐倉駅 （おおさくら） |
| Osamunai Station | 納内駅 （おさむない） |
| Osashima Station | 筬島駅 （おさしま） |
| Ōsato Station | 大里駅 （おおさと） |
| Osatsu Station | 長都駅 （おさつ） |
| Osatsunai Station | 於札内駅 （おさつない） |
| Ōsawa Station (Niigata) | 大沢駅 (新潟県) （おおさわ） |
| Ōsawa Station (Yamagata) | 大沢駅 (山形県) （おおさわ） |
| Oshamambe Station | 長万部駅 （おしゃまんべ） |
| Oshiage Station | 押上駅 （おしあげ） |
| Oshibedani Station | 押部谷駅 （おしべだに） |
| Ōshida Station | 大志田駅 （おおしだ） |
| Oshikado Station | 押角駅 （おしかど） |
| Oshikiri Station | 押切駅 （おしきり） |
| Oshima Station | 小島駅 （おしま） |
| Ōshima Station | 大島駅 (岐阜県) （おおしま） |
| Oshima-Numajiri Station | 渡島沼尻駅 （おしまぬまじり） |
| Oshima-Sawara Station | 渡島砂原駅 （おしまさわら） |
| Oshima-Tōbetsu Station | 渡島当別駅 （おしまとうべつ） |
| Oshima-Tsuruoka Station | 渡島鶴岡駅 （おしまつるおか） |
| Oshimi Station | 忍海駅 （おしみ） |
| Ōshimizu Station | 大清水駅 （おおしみず） |
| Oshino Station | 押野駅 （おしの） |
| Ōshinozuchō Station | 大篠津町駅 （おおしのづちょう） |
| Ōshio Station (Fukui) | 王子保駅 （おうしお） |
| Ōshio Station (Hyogo) | 大塩駅 （おおしお） |
| Oshioe Station | 小塩江駅 （おしおえ） |
| Ōshirakawa Station | 大白川駅 （おおしらかわ） |
| Oshironai Station | 尾白内駅 （おしろない） |
| Ōshō Station | 大庄駅 （おおしょう） |
| Ōshōji Station | 大小路駅 （おおしょうじ） |
| Osokinai Station | 晩生内駅 （おそきない） |
| Ōsoneura Station | 大曽根浦駅 （おおそねうら） |
| Ōsugi Station | 大杉駅 （おおすぎ） |
| Ōsukannon Station | 大須観音駅 （おおすかんのん） |
| Ōsumi Station | 大住駅 （おおすみ） |
| Ōsumi-Natsui Station | 大隅夏井駅 （おおすみなつい） |
| Ōsumi-Yokogawa Station | 大隅横川駅 （おおすみよこがわ） |
| Ōsumi-Ōkawara Station | 大隅大川原駅 （おおすみおおかわら） |
| Ōta Station (Gunma) | 太田駅 (群馬県) （おおた） |
| Ōta Station (Kagawa) | 太田駅 (香川県) （おおた） |
| Otabayashi Station | 小田林駅 （おたばやし） |
| Ōtabe Station | 太田部駅 （おおたべ） |
| Ōtagawa Station | 太田川駅 （おおたがわ） |
| Ōtagiri Station | 大田切駅 （おおたぎり） |
| Ōtagō Station | 大田郷駅 （おおたごう） |
| Ōtaguchi Station | 大田口駅 （おおたぐち） |
| Otai Station | 小田井駅 （おたい） |
| Ōtake Station | 大竹駅 （おおたけ） |
| Ōtaki Station (Chiba) | 大多喜駅 （おおたき） |
| Ōtaki Station (Yamagata) | 大滝駅 （おおたき） |
| Ōtaki-Onsen Station | 大滝温泉駅 （おおたきおんせん） |
| Ōtani Station (Shiga) | 大谷駅 (滋賀県) （おおたに） |
| Ōtani Station (Wakayama) | 大谷駅 (和歌山県) （おおたに） |
| Otanoshike Station | 大楽毛駅 （おたのしけ） |
| Otaru Station | 小樽駅 （おたる） |
| Otaruchikkō Station | 小樽築港駅 （おたるちっこう） |
| Ōtemachi Station (Ehime) | 大手町駅 (愛媛県) （おおてまち） |
| Ōtemachi Station (Tokyo) | 大手町駅 (東京都) （おおてまち） |
| Ōtera Station | 大寺駅 （おおてら） |
| Ōto Station | 大戸駅 （おおと） |
| Ōtoba Station (Fukui) | 大鳥羽駅 （おおとば） |
| Ōtoba Station (Gifu) | 大外羽駅 （おおとば） |
| Otobaru Station | 乙原駅 (大分県) （おとばる） |
| Otogawa Station | 男川駅 （おとがわ） |
| Otoineppu Station | 音威子府駅 （おといねっぷ） |
| Otomaru Station | 乙丸駅 （おとまる） |
| Otome Station | 乙女駅 （おとめ） |
| Otomesaka Station | 乙女坂駅 （おとめさか） |
| Otomo Station | 小友駅 （おとも） |
| Ōtori Station | 鳳駅 （おおとり） |
| Ōtorii Station | 大鳥居駅 （おおとりい） |
| Ōtoshi Station | 大歳駅 （おおとし） |
| Otoshibe Station | 落部駅 （おとしべ） |
| Otōbashi Station | 尾頭橋駅 （おとうばし） |
| Otowachō Station | 音羽町駅 （おとわちょう） |
| Otozawa Station | 音沢駅 （おとざわ） |
| Ōtsu Station | 大津駅 （おおつ） |
| Ōtsuchi Station | 大槌駅 （おおつち） |
| Ōtsuka Station | 大塚駅 (東京都) （おおつか） |
| Ōtsuka-Teikyōdaigaku Station | 大塚・帝京大学駅 （おおつか・ていきょうだいがく） |
| Ōtsuka-eki-mae Station | 大塚駅前駅 （おおつかえきまえ） |
| Ōtsuki Station | 大月駅 （おおつき） |
| Ōtsukō Station | 大津港駅 （おおつこう） |
| Ōtsukyō Station | 大津京駅 （おおつきょう） |
| Ōtsumachi Station | 大津町駅 （おおつまち） |
| Ōtsuru Station | 大鶴駅 （おおつる） |
| Otsu-shiyakusho-mae Station | 大津市役所前駅 （おおつしやくしょまえ） |
| Ottomo Station | 乙供駅 （おっとも） |
| Ōuchi Station | 大内駅 （おおうち） |
| Ōuchiyama Station | 大内山駅 （おおうちやま） |
| Ōura Station | 大浦駅 （おおうら） |
| Owada Station | 大和田駅 (静岡県) （おわだ） |
| Ōwada Station (Hokkaido) | 大和田駅 (北海道) （おおわだ） |
| Ōwada Station (Nara) | 大輪田駅 （おおわだ） |
| Ōwada Station (Osaka) | 大和田駅 (大阪府) （おおわだ） |
| Ōwada Station (Saitama) | 大和田駅 (埼玉県) （おおわだ） |
| Ōwani Station | 大鰐駅 （おおわに） |
| Ōwanionsen Station | 大鰐温泉駅 （おおわにおんせん） |
| Owariasahi Station | 尾張旭駅 （おわりあさひ） |
| Owari-Hoshinomiya Station | 尾張星の宮駅 （おわりほしのみや） |
| Owari-Ichinomiya Station | 尾張一宮駅 （おわりいちのみや） |
| Owari-Morioka Station | 尾張森岡駅 （おわりもりおか） |
| Owari-Seto Station | 尾張瀬戸駅 （おわりせと） |
| Owari-Yokosuka Station | 尾張横須賀駅 （おわりよこすか） |
| Owase Station | 尾鷲駅 （おわせ） |
| Ōya Station (Gifu) | 大矢駅 （おおや） |
| Ōya Station (Nagano) | 大屋駅 （おおや） |
| Ōyakaigan Station | 大谷海岸駅 （おおやかいがん） |
| Ōyabu Station | 大藪駅 （おおやぶ） |
| Ōyachi Station (Hokkaido) | 大谷地駅 （おおやち） |
| Ōyachi Station (Mie) | 大矢知駅 （おおやち） |
| Oyahana Station | 親鼻駅 （おやはな） |
| Oyama Station | 小山駅 （おやま） |
| Ōyama Station (Kagoshima) | 大山駅 (鹿児島県) （おおやま） |
| Ōyama Station (Tokyo) | 大山駅 (東京都) （おおやま） |
| Ōyama Cable Station | 大山ケーブル駅 （おおやまけーぶる） |
| Oyamada Station | 小山田駅 （おやまだ） |
| Oyamadai Station | 尾山台駅 （おやまだい） |
| Ōyamadera Station | 大山寺駅 (神奈川県) （おおやまでら） |
| Ōyamazaki Station | 大山崎駅 （おおやまざき） |
| Oyanagi Station | 小柳駅 (石川県) （おやなぎ） |
| Oyashirazu Station | 親不知駅 （おやしらず） |
| Oyumino Station | おゆみ野駅 （おゆみの） |
| Ōzai Station | 大在駅 （おおざい） |
| Ozaki Station | 尾崎駅 （おざき） |
| Ozaku Station | 小作駅 （おざく） |
| Ōzawanai Station | 大沢内駅 （おおざわない） |
| Ōzeki Station (Fukui) | 大関駅 （おおぜき） |
| Ōzeki Station (Fukuoka) | 大堰駅 （おおぜき） |
| Ozekiyama Station | 尾関山駅 （おぜきやま） |
| Ōzone Station | 大曽根駅 （おおぞね） |
| Ōzore Station | 大嵐駅 （おおぞれ） |
| Ōzuka Station | 大塚駅 (広島県) （おおづか） |
| Ozuki Station | 小月駅 （おづき） |
