= Aso Station =

Aso Station is the name of multiple train stations in Japan:

- Aso Station (Kumamoto) (阿蘇駅) in Kumamoto Prefecture
- Aso Station (Mie) (阿曽駅) in Mie Prefecture
- Asō Station (吾桑駅) in Kōchi Prefecture
