= Tosa Domain Battery =

- 土佐藩砲台跡 (Japanese)
- Location within Kochi Prefecture Location within Japan
- 33°23′16″N 133°17′02″E
- Type: fortification
- Location: Susaki, Kochi, Japan

History
- Built: 1863
- Demolished: 1908
- National Historic Site of Japan

The Tosa Domain Battery (土佐藩砲台跡, Tosa-han Hōdai-ato) was a Bakumatsu period coastal artillery battery erected by Tosa Domain on the Pacific coast in the Susaki neighborhood of the city of Susaki, Kochi in the island of Shikoku, Japan. The ruins were designated a National Historic Site in 1944.

== Background ==
In the late Edo period, the Tokugawa shogunate was increasing alarmed by incursions by foreign ships into Japanese territorial waters, fearing that these kurofune warships of the United States or other Western powers would attempt to end Japan's self-imposed national isolation policy by force, or would attempt an invasion of Japan by landing hostile military forces. Numerous feudal domains were ordered to establish fortifications along their coastlines with shore artillery located at strategic locations. The powerful daimyō of Tosa Domain, Yamauchi Yōdō had three batteries erected to protect the entrance of Susaki Bay, the domain's main port, from July to August 1863.

Although the Tosa Domain Battery was never used in combat, tensions were high after the Icarus affair in Nagasaki in 1867. Two British sailors were murdered by an unknown swordsman, and the British suspected the Kaientai led by Sakamoto Ryōma was behind the incident. Sir Harry Parkes, head of the British Legation, sailed to Kōchi on a gunboat to demand reparations and anchored off shore the Tosa Domain Battery. After several days it was evident that the British lacked sufficient evidence, and charges against the domain were eventually dropped.

In 1908, the site of the western fortification, the Nishidaiba, was sold to the town of Susaki, and became Nishihama Park. The earthworks and stone walls of the battery remain are still in good condition, and the entrance to the ammunition room was blocked off with masonry in later years. Archaeological excavations were conducted in 2007.

== Design ==
The Tosa Domain Western Battery was a bow-shaped earthen rampart with a length of 116 meters, in the form of a redan with an open back, faced with stone on its inner and side surfaces. It contained seven gun ports, with a gunpowder magazine set up inside the stone wall. The Eastern Battery was of similar design, and Middle Battery was straight-shaped. All three batteries were on the western shore of the entrance to Susaki Bay. No traces of either the Eastern nor the Middle Battery have survived.

The site is located about a seven-minute walk from Tosa-Shinjō Station on the JR Shikoku Dosan Line.

== See also ==
- List of Historic Sites of Japan (Kōchi)
- Maruoka Domain Battery
