= Karasaki Station =

Railway station in Ōtsu, Shiga Prefecture, Japan

Coordinates: 35.0497°N 135.8669°E

Karasaki Station 唐崎駅
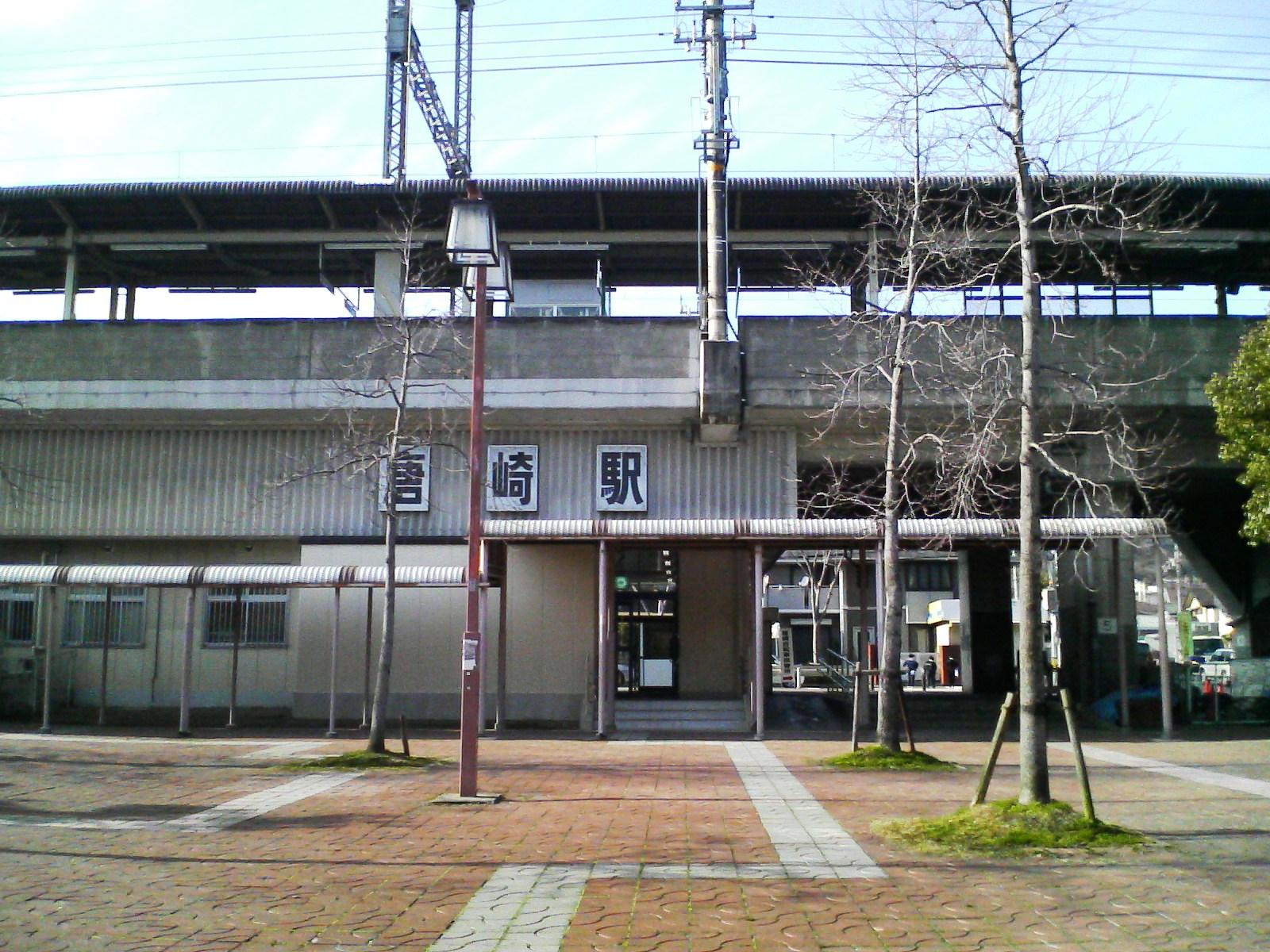
- Karasaki Station, February 2008

General information
- Location: 2-11 Karasaki, Ōtsu-shi, Shiga-ken 520-0106; Japan
- Operator: JR West
- Line: Kosei Line
- Distance: 8.5 km from Yamashina
- Platforms: 1 island platforms
- Tracks: 2

Construction
- Structure type: Elevated
- Accessible: Yes

Other information
- Station code: JR-B28
- Website: Official website

History
- Opened: 20 July 1974

Passengers
- FY 2023: 6,992 daily
Location
- Location within Shiga Prefecture Location within Japan

Karasaki Station (唐崎駅, Karasaki-eki) is a passenger railway station located in the city of Ōtsu, Shiga Prefecture, Japan, operated by the West Japan Railway Company (JR West).

== Lines ==
Karasaki Station is served by the Kosei Line, and is 8.5 kilometres (5.3 miles) from the starting point of the line at Yamashina and 14.0 kilometres (8.7 miles) from Kyoto.

== Station layout ==
The station consists of one elevated island platform with the station building underneath. The station is staffed.

== Platforms ==
1	■ Kosei Line	for Katata , Ōmi-Imazu and Tsuruga
2	■ Kosei Line	for Kyoto

== Adjacent Stations ==
«	Service	»
Kosei Line
Special Rapid Service: Does not stop at this station
Rapid Service: Does not stop at this station
Ōtsukyō	Local	Hieizan Sakamoto

== History ==
The station opened on 20 July 1974 as a station on the Japan National Railway (JNR). The station became part of the West Japan Railway Company on 1 April 1987 due to the privatization and dissolution of the JNR.

Station numbering was introduced in March 2018 with Karasaki being assigned station number JR-B28.

== Passenger statistics ==
In fiscal 2019, the station was used by an average of 3871 passengers daily (boarding passengers only).

== Surrounding area ==
- Otsu City Hall Karasaki Branch
- Karasaki Shrine
- Otsu Municipal Karasaki Junior High School
- Otsu City Karasaki Elementary School

== See also ==
- List of railway stations in Japan
