= Itaya Station =

Railway station in Yonezawa, Yamagata Prefecture, Japan

Itaya Station 板谷駅
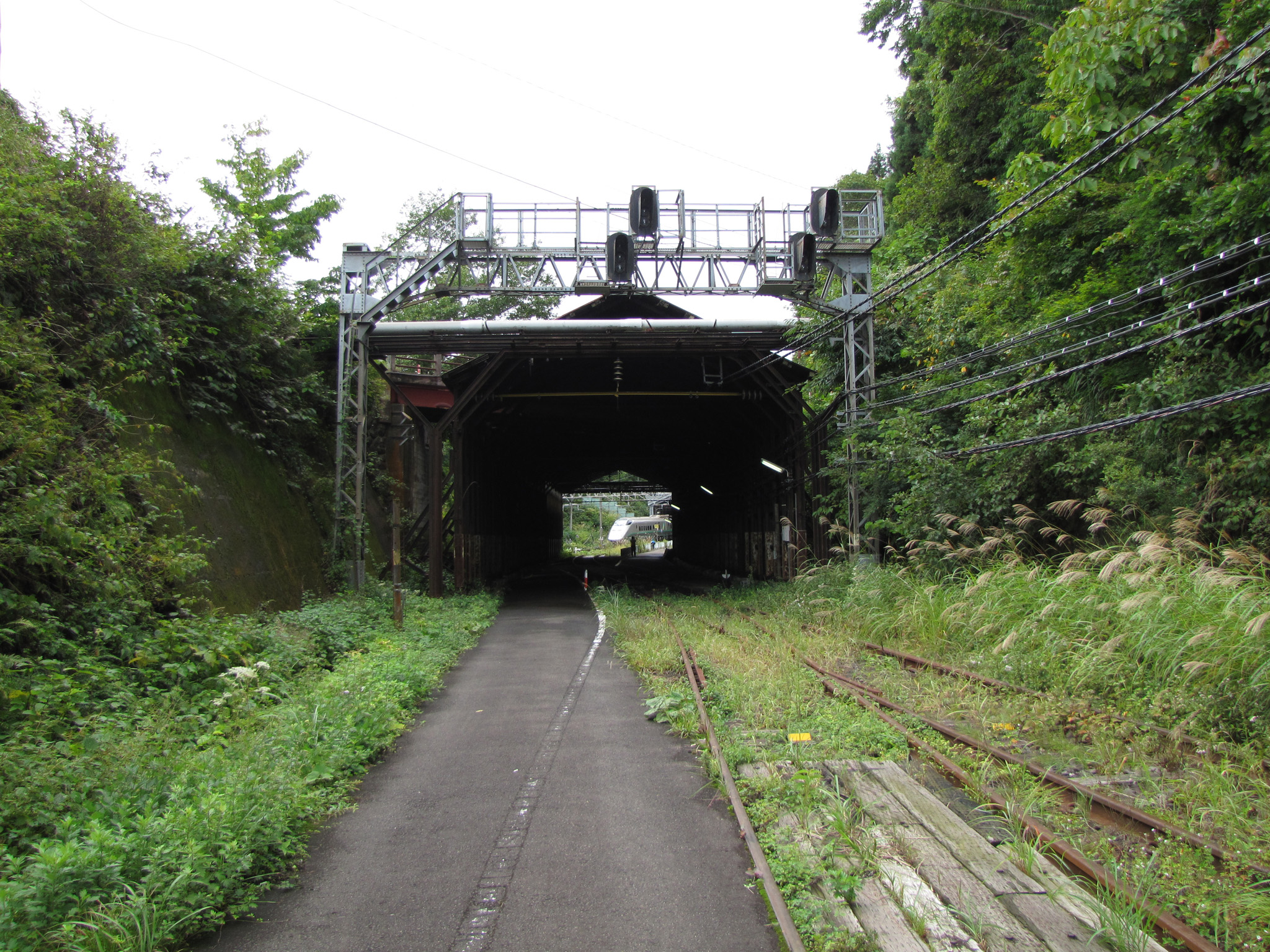
- Itaya Station entrance in September 2012

General information
- Location: 582 Itaya, Yonezawa-shi, Yamagata-ken 992-1331; Japan
- Coordinates: 37°48′42″N 140°16′07″E
- Operator: JR East
- Line: ■ Ōu Main Line
- Distance: 21.2 km from Fukushima
- Platforms: 2 side platforms

Other information
- Status: Unstaffed
- Website: Official website

History
- Opened: 15 May 1899

Services
| Preceding station | JR East | Following station |
|---|---|---|
| Niwasaka towards Fukushima | Yamagata Line | Tōge towards Shinjō |
Location
- Location within Yamagata Prefecture Location within Japan

Itaya Station (板谷駅, Itaya-eki) is a railway station on the Ōu Main Line in the city of Yonezawa, Yamagata Prefecture, Japan, operated by East Japan Railway Company (JR East).

== Lines ==
Itaya Station is served by the Ōu Main Line, and is located 21.2 rail kilometers from the terminus of the line at Fukushima Station.

== Station layout ==
Itaya Station has two unnumbered opposite side platforms connected by a level crossing. The switching point of the tracks is protected by a snow shelter due to the heavy snowfall in the area in winter. The station is unattended.

=== Platforms ===
| Entrance side | ■ Ōu Main Line | for Fukushima |
| Opposite side | ■ Ōu Main Line | for Yonezawa |

== History ==
Itaya Station was opened on 15 May 1899. The station was absorbed into the JR East network upon the privatization of JNR on 1 April 1987.

Due to extremely low ridership, the station was bypassed by all trains between mid-January and late March in 2023–25. In the winter of 2025, trains began bypassing the station on December 1.

== Surrounding area ==
- National Route 13
- Kuriko International Ski & Resort

== See also ==
- List of railway stations in Japan
