= Tōge Station =

Railway station in Yonezawa, Yamagata Prefecture, Japan

Tōge Station 峠駅
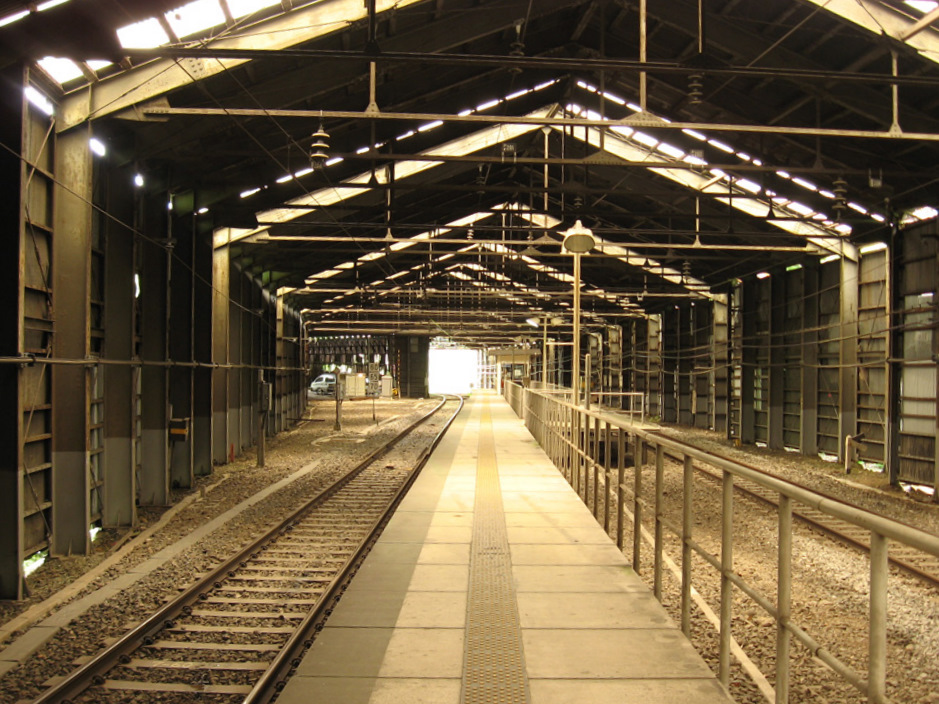
- Inside the station

General information
- Location: Ōsawa Tōge, Yonezawa-shi, Yamagata-ken 992–1303; Japan
- Coordinates: 37°48′43″N 140°14′09″E
- Operator: JR East
- Line: ■ Ōu Main Line
- Distance: 28.8 km from Fukushima
- Platforms: 1 island platform

Other information
- Status: Unstaffed
- Website: Official website

History
- Opened: 15 May 1899

Services
Preceding station	JR East	Following station
Itaya towards Fukushima	Yamagata Line	Ōsawa towards Shinjō
Location
- Location within Yamagata Prefecture Location within Japan

Tōge Station (峠駅, Tōge-eki) is a railway station in the city of Yonezawa, Yamagata Prefecture, Japan, operated by East Japan Railway Company (JR East).

== Lines ==
Tōge Station is served by the Ōu Main Line, and is located 28.8 rail kilometers from the terminus of the line at Fukushima Station.

== Station layout ==
The station has a single island platform connected to the station building by a level crossing. The station is located within a snow shelter, as it is located in a region of very heavy snowfalls in winter. The station is unattended.

=== Platforms ===
Entrance side	■ Ōu Main Line	for Fukushima
Opposite side	■ Ōu Main Line	for Yonezawa

== History ==
Tōge Station began as a signal stop on 15 May 1899 and was elevated to a full passenger station on 1 August 1899. The station was absorbed into the JR East network upon the privatization of JNR on 1 April 1987.

Before the opening of the Yamagata Shinkansen in 1992, the station used different platforms that could only be accessed through a switchback manoeuvre. However, with upgrades to the line in preparation of the opening of the shinkansen, these old platforms were abandoned on the 1st of September 1990 in favour of the current platforms where there is no need for the switchback manoeuvre.

== Surrounding area ==
The station is surrounded by wooded hills.

- Ubayu Onsen
- Namegawa Onsen

== See also ==
- List of railway stations in Japan
