= Hieizan Sakamoto Station =

Railway station in Ōtsu, Shiga Prefecture, Japan

Hieizan Sakamoto Station 比叡山坂本駅
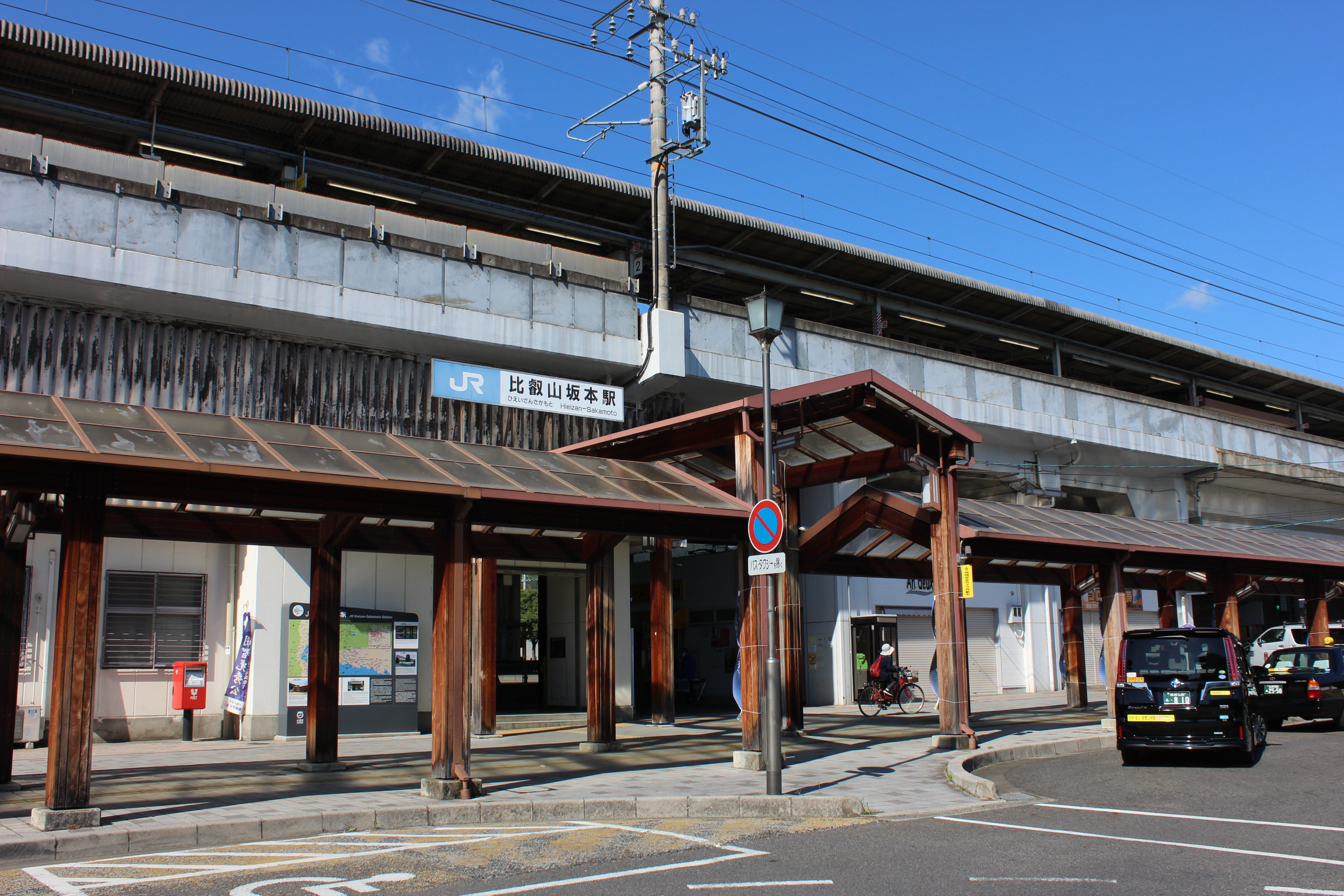
- Hieizan Sakamoto Station, October 2010

General information
- Location: 13-31-47 Sakamoto, Ōtsu-shi, Shiga-ken 520-0113; Japan
- Coordinates: 35.0704°N 135.8782°E
- Operator: JR West
- Line: Kosei Line
- Distance: 11.1 km from Yamashina
- Platforms: 1 island platforms
- Tracks: 2

Construction
- Structure type: Elevated
- Accessible: Yes

Other information
- Station code: JR-B27
- Website: Official website

History
- Opened: 20 July 1974

Passengers
- FY 2023: 11,062 daily
Location
- Location within Shiga Prefecture Location within Japan

Hieizan Sakamoto Station (比叡山坂本駅, Hieizan Sakamoto-eki) is a passenger railway station located in the city of Ōtsu, Shiga Prefecture, Japan, operated by the West Japan Railway Company (JR West).

== Lines ==
Hieizan Sakamoto Station is served by the Kosei Line, and is 11.1 kilometres (6.9 miles) from the starting point of the line at Yamashina and 16.6 kilometres (10.3 miles) from Kyoto.

== Station layout ==
The station consists of one elevated island platforms with the station building underneath. The station is staffed.

== Platforms ==
1	■ Kosei Line	for Katata, Ōmi-Imazu and Tsuruga
2	■ Kosei Line	for Kyoto

== Adjacent Stations ==
«	Service	»
Kosei Line
Ōtsukyō	Special Rapid Service	Katata
Ōtsukyō	Rapid Service	Ogoto-onsen
Karasaki	Local	Ogoto-onsen

== History ==
The station opened on 20 July 1974 as Eizan Station (叡山駅, Eizan-eki) on the Japan National Railway (JNR). The station became part of the West Japan Railway Company on 1 April 1987 due to the privatization and dissolution of the JNR. The station's name was changed to its current name on 4 September 1994. Hieizan and Eizan both refer to Mount Hiei, about 4 kilometres (2.5 miles) west of the station.

Station numbering was introduced in March 2018 with Hieizan Sakamoto being assigned station number JR-B27.

== Passenger statistics ==
In fiscal 2019, the station was used by an average of 5,630 passengers daily (boarding passengers only).

== Surrounding area ==
- Saikyoji Temple
- Otsu City Hall Sakamoto Branch
- Otsu City Hiyoshi Junior High School
- Otsu City Sakamoto Elementary School
- visit Hiei Garden

== See also ==
- List of railway stations in Japan
