= Susaki =

Susaki 須崎市
- City
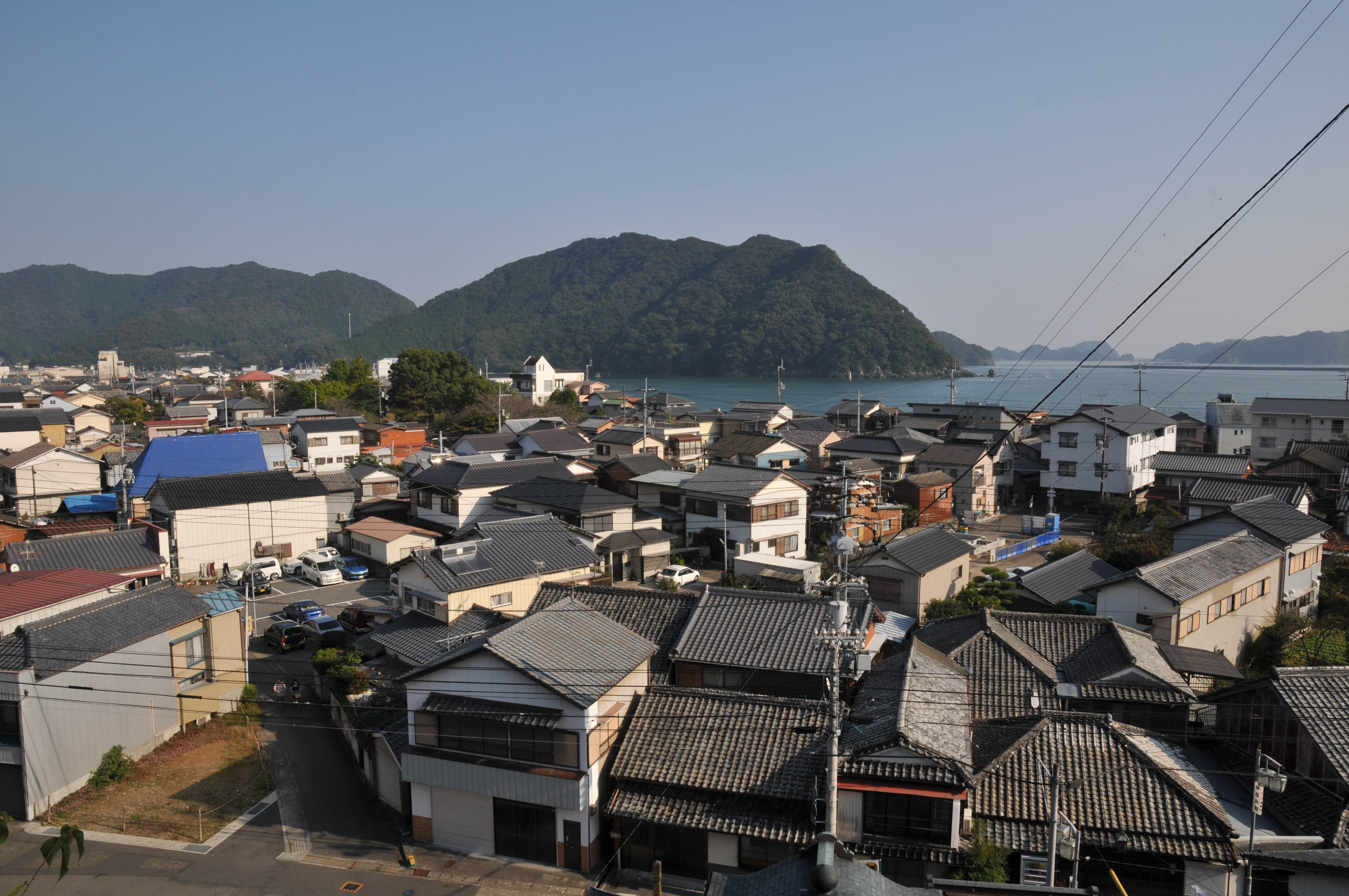
- View of Susaki city

- Flag Seal
- Location of Susaki in Kōchi Prefecture

- Location in Japan
- Coordinates: 33°23′33″N 133°17′35″E
- Country: Japan
- Region: Shikoku
- Prefecture: Kōchi

Government
  - Mayor: Kosaku Kusunose (since February 2012)

Area
  - Total: 135.44 km^{2} (52.29 sq mi)

Population (31 July 2022)
  - Total: 20,429
  - Density: 150.83/km^{2} (390.66/sq mi)
- Time zone: UTC+09:00 (JST)
- City hall address: 1-7 Yamate-machi, Susaki-shi, Kochi-ken 785-8601
- Climate: Cfa
- Website: Official website
- Symbols
- Bird: Alcedo atthis
- Flower: Prunus jamasakura
- Tree: Cherry blossom

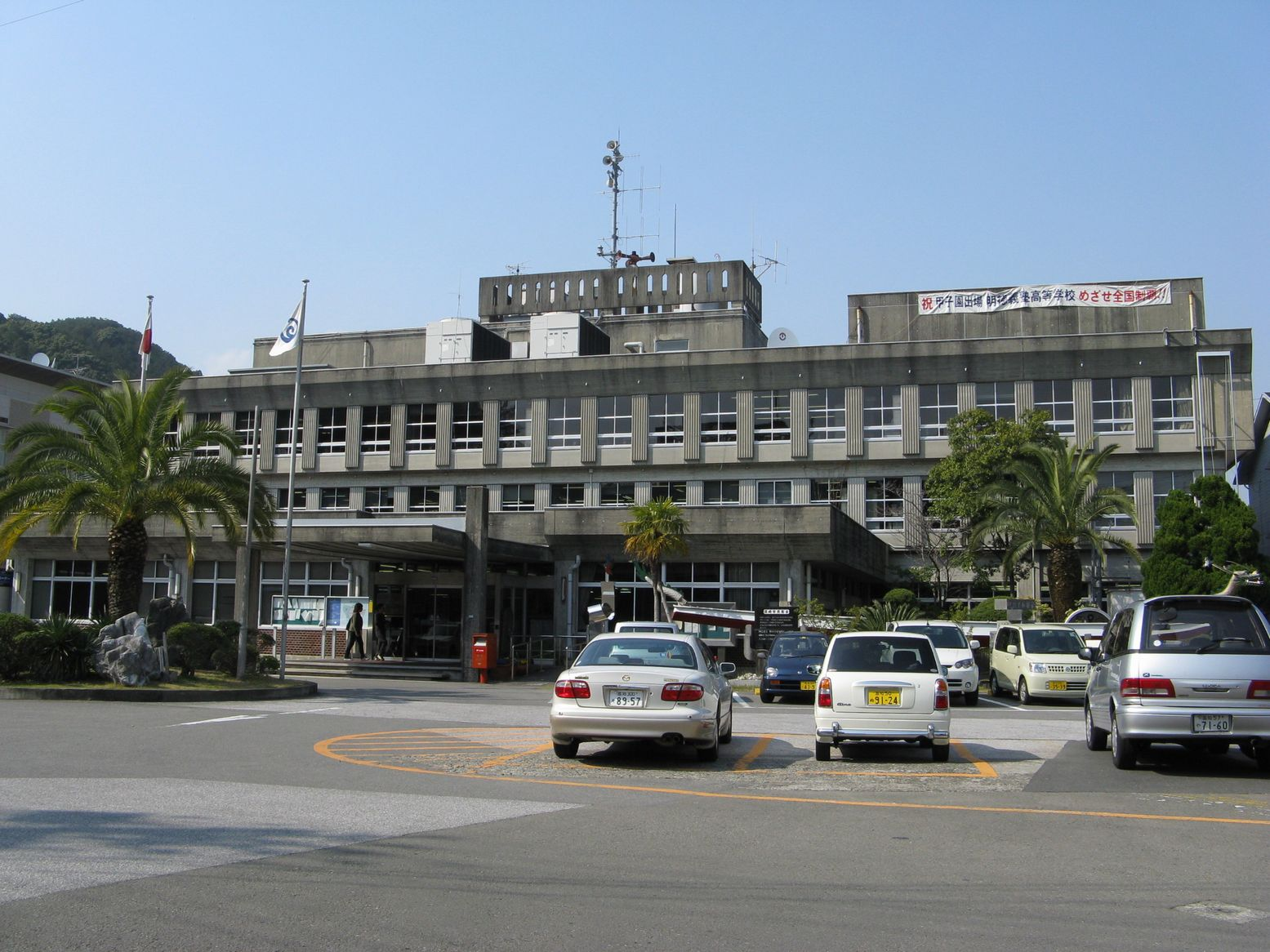
Susaki City Hall

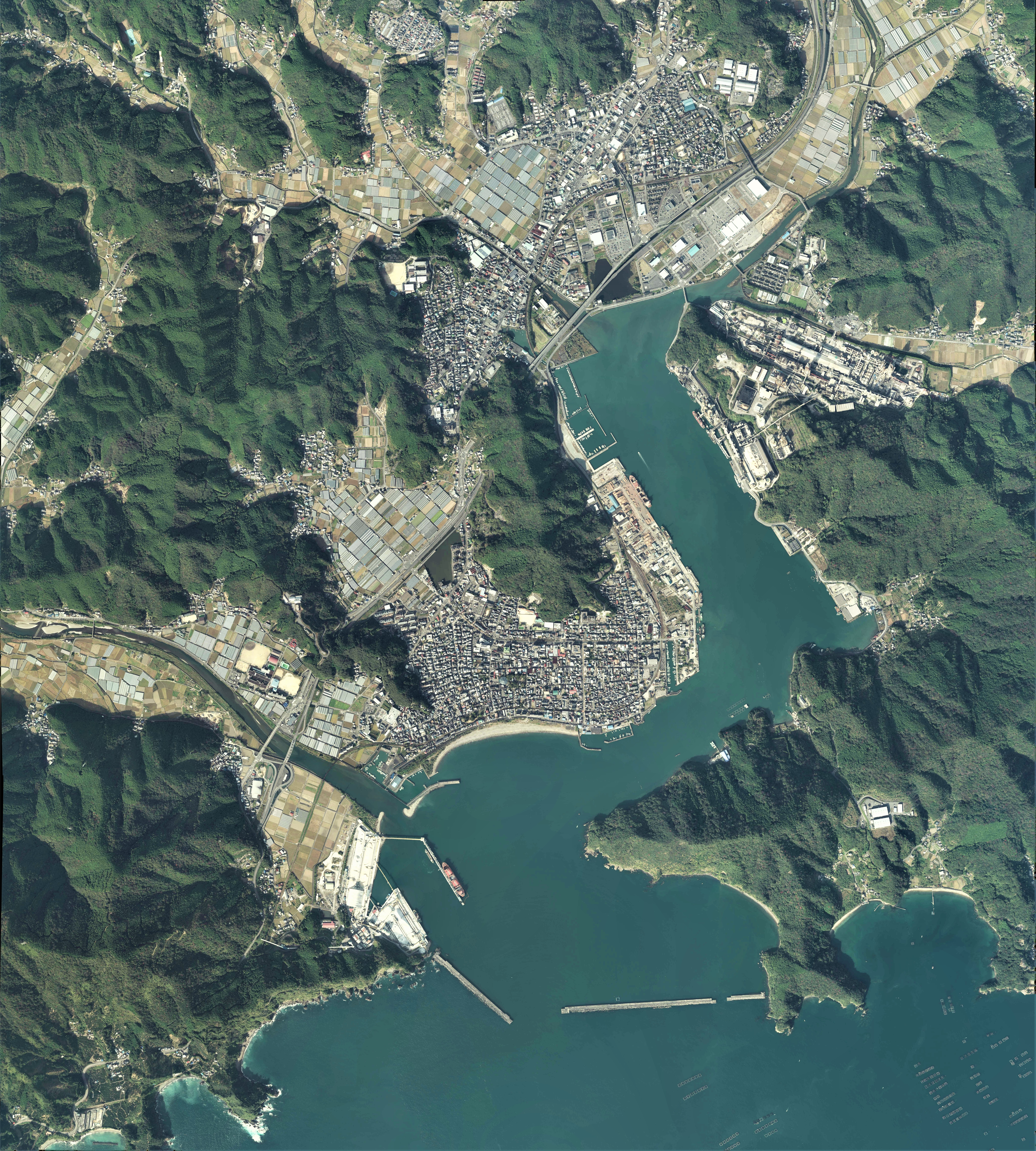
Aerial view of Susaki city center

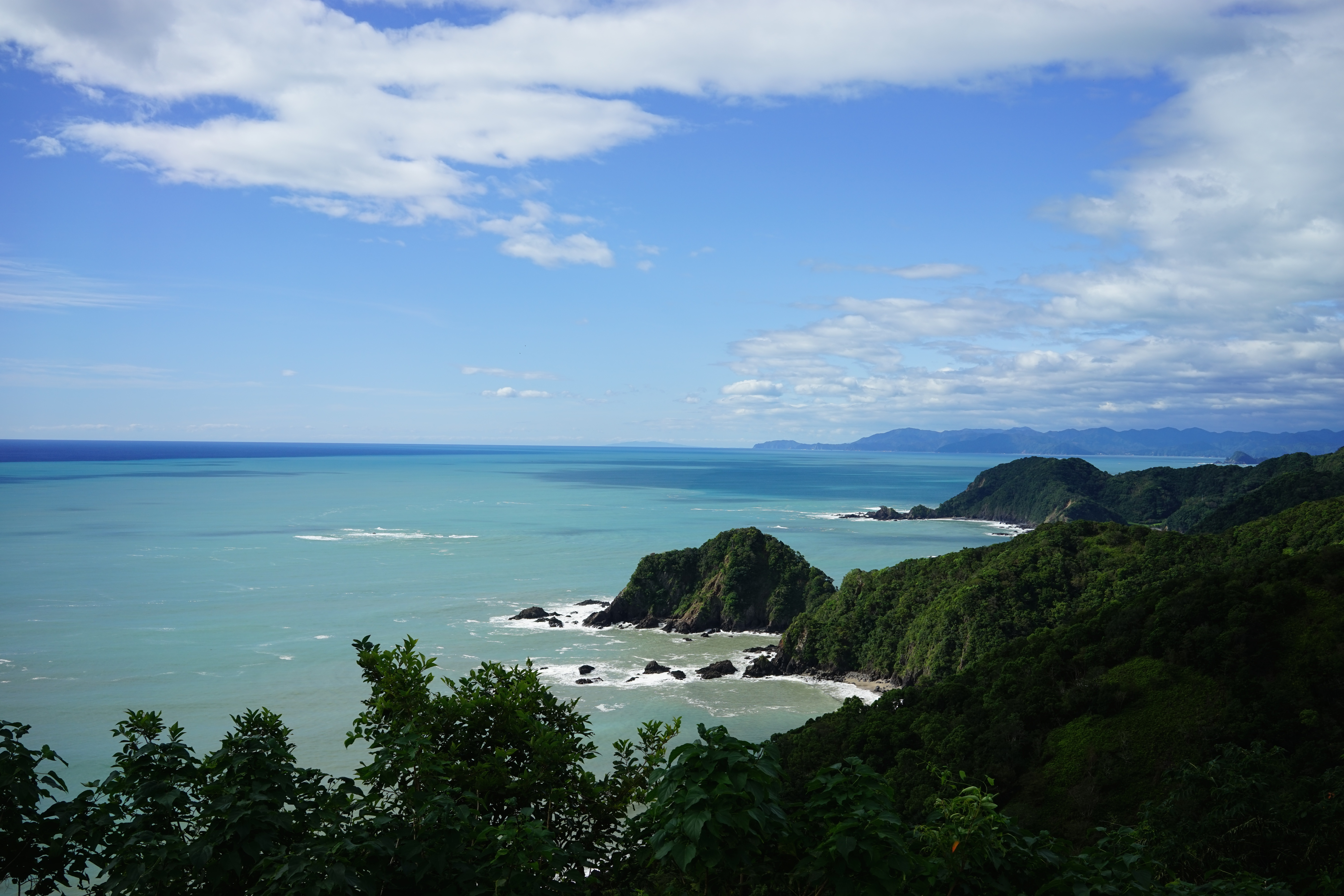
Yokonami-Kuroshio coast

Susaki (須崎市, Susaki-shi) is a city located in Kōchi Prefecture, Japan. As of 31 July 2022, the city had an estimated population of 20‚429 in 10672 households and a population density of 150 persons per km^{2}. The total area of the city is 135.44 square kilometres (52.29 sq mi).

== Geography ==
Susaki is located in central Kōchi Prefecture, facing Tosa Bay of the Pacific Ocean to the south and bordered by mountains to the north. Most of the city area is forest. The coastline is intricate, with deep coves such as Uranouchi Bay and Susaki Bay.

=== Neighbouring municipalities ===
Kōchi Prefecture

- Nakatosa
- Sakawa
- Tosa
- Tsuno

=== Climate ===
Susaki has a humid subtropical climate (Köppen climate classification Cfa) with hot, humid summers and cool winters. There is significant precipitation throughout the year, especially during June and July. The average annual temperature in Susaki is 16.8 °C (62.2 °F). The average annual rainfall is 2,780.2 mm (109.46 in) with September as the wettest month. The temperatures are highest on average in August, at around 27.2 °C (81.0 °F), and lowest in January, at around 6.7 °C (44.1 °F). The highest temperature ever recorded in Susaki was 39.3 °C (102.7 °F) on 8 August 2006; the coldest temperature ever recorded was −5.7 °C (21.7 °F) on 26 February 1981.

Climate data for Susaki (1991−2020 normals, extremes 1977−present)
Month	Jan	Feb	Mar	Apr	May	Jun	Jul	Aug	Sep	Oct	Nov	Dec	Year
Record high °C (°F)	21.3 (70.3)	23.5 (74.3)	27.4 (81.3)	29.8 (85.6)	34.2 (93.6)	35.3 (95.5)	38.7 (101.7)	39.3 (102.7)	35.8 (96.4)	32.8 (91.0)	28.8 (83.8)	23.8 (74.8)	39.3 (102.7)
Mean daily maximum °C (°F)	12.3 (54.1)	13.1 (55.6)	16.1 (61.0)	20.4 (68.7)	24.0 (75.2)	26.3 (79.3)	30.1 (86.2)	31.4 (88.5)	29.1 (84.4)	24.8 (76.6)	19.7 (67.5)	14.5 (58.1)	21.8 (71.3)
Daily mean °C (°F)	6.7 (44.1)	7.6 (45.7)	10.8 (51.4)	15.3 (59.5)	19.4 (66.9)	22.4 (72.3)	26.2 (79.2)	27.2 (81.0)	24.4 (75.9)	19.4 (66.9)	13.9 (57.0)	8.7 (47.7)	16.8 (62.3)
Mean daily minimum °C (°F)	2.1 (35.8)	2.8 (37.0)	5.7 (42.3)	10.3 (50.5)	14.9 (58.8)	19.1 (66.4)	23.1 (73.6)	23.8 (74.8)	20.8 (69.4)	15.1 (59.2)	9.3 (48.7)	4.1 (39.4)	12.6 (54.7)
Record low °C (°F)	−5.5 (22.1)	−5.7 (21.7)	−3.0 (26.6)	0.1 (32.2)	6.0 (42.8)	11.7 (53.1)	16.5 (61.7)	16.9 (62.4)	11.2 (52.2)	4.4 (39.9)	0.0 (32.0)	−3.4 (25.9)	−5.7 (21.7)
Average precipitation mm (inches)	68.3 (2.69)	99.2 (3.91)	187.8 (7.39)	221.6 (8.72)	275.9 (10.86)	376.8 (14.83)	338.2 (13.31)	326.2 (12.84)	428.3 (16.86)	230.2 (9.06)	141.3 (5.56)	86.4 (3.40)	2,780.2 (109.46)
Average precipitation days (≥ 1.0 mm)	6.0	7.6	10.4	10.2	10.4	14.8	12.7	12.3	13.1	8.7	7.3	6.3	119.8
Mean monthly sunshine hours	187.8	177.9	197.3	197.7	203.9	140.6	184.8	213.3	161.3	178.8	168.7	182.6	2,197.3
Source: Japan Meteorological Agency

== Demographics ==
Per Japanese census data, the population of Susaki in 2020 is 20,590 people. Susaki has been conducting censuses since 1920.

Historical population
Year	Pop.	±%
1920	24,557	—
1925	25,347	+3.2%
1930	25,898	+2.2%
1935	25,998	+0.4%
1940	25,786	−0.8%
1945	33,412	+29.6%
1950	34,113	+2.1%
1955	34,192	+0.2%
1960	32,976	−3.6%
1965	32,020	−2.9%
1970	31,050	−3.0%
1975	31,019	−0.1%
1980	31,852	+2.7%
1985	31,378	−1.5%
1990	30,295	−3.5%
1995	28,742	−5.1%
2000	27,569	−4.1%
2005	26,039	−5.5%
2010	24,698	−5.1%
2015	22,606	−8.5%
2020	20,590	−8.9%
Susaki population statistics

== History ==
As with all of Kōchi Prefecture, the area of Susaki was part of ancient Tosa Province. During the Edo period, the area was part of the holdings of Tosa Domain ruled by the Yamauchi clan from their seat at Kōchi Castle. Following the Meiji restoration, the town of Susaki was established within Takaoka District, Kōchi with the creation of the modern municipalities system on October 1, 1889. It was elevated to city status on October 1, 1954.

== Government ==
Susaki has a mayor-council form of government with a directly elected mayor and a unicameral city council of 15 members. Susaki contributes one member to the Kōchi Prefectural Assembly. In terms of national politics, the city is part of the Kōchi 1st district of the lower house of the Diet of Japan.

== Economy ==
Agriculture and commercial fishing are mainstays of the local economy, with charcoal production and cement also major contributors.

== Education ==
Susaki has eight public elementary schools and five public middle schools operated by the city government and one public high schools operated by the Kōchi Prefectural Department of Education. There is also one private combined middle and high school.

== Transportation ==
=== Railway ===
Shikoku Railway Company - Dosan Line

- Asō - Ōnogō - Ōma - Susaki - Tosa-Shinjō - Awa

=== Highways ===
- Kōchi Expressway
- National Route 56
- National Route 197
- National Route 494

== Sister cities ==
- Castanhal, Brazil, since 1979
- Tauranga, New Zealand, since 1997
- Louny, Czech Republic, since 2026

== Local attractions ==
- Tosa Domain Battery site, National Historic Site

== In popular media ==
Susaki's official mascot is Shinjo-kun, a Japanese river otter wearing a hot pot ramen dish for a hat. Japanese river otter is an extinct variety of otter, that was last documented in the mouth of the Shinjo River in Susaki.

Susaki has hit the worldwide press due to an unofficial mascot, also an otter, named Chiitan. Chiitan is somewhat violent, but in a humorous way. A 2019 episode of Last Week Tonight with John Oliver discussed the humor of Chiitan. In May 2019, Chiitan was banned from Twitter for inflammatory content. There is speculation that this disturbing but amusing content can help the city of Susaki, either by attracting tourists or because Japanese can donate a portion of their taxes to cities where they are not resident.
