= Ogoto-onsen Station =

Railway station in Ōtsu, Shiga Prefecture, Japan

Ogoto-onsen Station おごと温泉駅
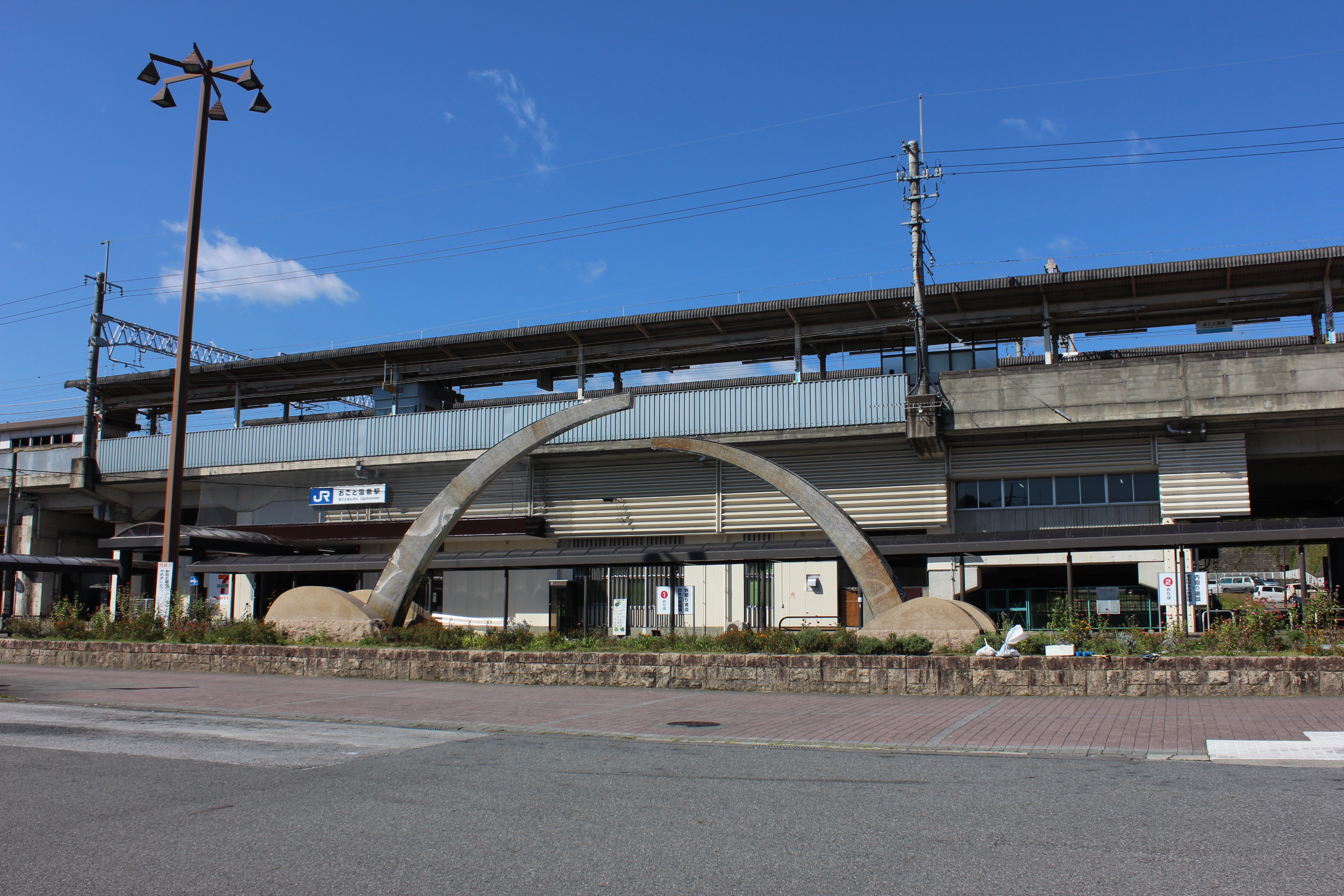
- Ogoto-onsen Station, October 2010

General information
- Location: 1-4 Ogotokita, Ōtsu-shi, Shiga-ken 520-0107; Japan
- Coordinates: 35°05′50″N 135°53′42″E
- Operator: JR West
- Line: Kosei Line
- Distance: 14.5 km from Yamashina
- Platforms: 2 island platforms
- Tracks: 4
- Connections: Bus terminal

Construction
- Structure type: Elevated
- Accessible: Yes

Other information
- Station code: JR-B26
- Website: Official website

History
- Opened: 20 July 1974
- Former names: Ogoto (to 2008)

Passengers
- FY 2023: 10,826 daily
Location
- Location within Shiga Prefecture Location within Japan

Ogoto-onsen Station (おごと温泉駅, Ogoto-onsen-ek) is a passenger railway station located in the city of Ōtsu, Shiga Prefecture, Japan, operated by the West Japan Railway Company (JR West).

== Lines ==
Ogoto-onsen Station is served by the Kosei Line, and is 14.5 kilometres (9.0 miles) from the starting point of the line at Yamashina and 20.0 kilometres (12.4 miles) from Kyoto.

== Station layout ==
The station consists of two elevated island platforms with the station building underneath. The station is staffed.

== Platforms ==
1, 2	■ Kosei Line	for Ōmi-Imazu and Tsuruga
3, 4	■ Kosei Line	for Kyoto

== Adjacent Stations ==
«	Service	»
West Japan Railway Company Kosei Line
Special Rapid Service: Does not stop at this station
Hieizan Sakamoto	Rapid Service	Katata
Hieizan Sakamoto	Local	Katata

== History ==
The station opened on 20 July 1974 as Ogoto Station (雄琴駅, Ogoto-eki) on the Japan National Railway (JNR). The station became part of the West Japan Railway Company on 1 April 1987 due to the privatization and dissolution of the JNR. The station name was renamed to the present name on 15 March 2008.

Station numbering was introduced in March 2018 with Ogoto-onsen being assigned station number JR-B26.

== Passenger statistics ==
In fiscal 2019, the station was used by an average of 6,313 passengers daily (boarding passengers only).

== Surrounding area ==
- Otsu City Ogoto Elementary School
- Japan National Route 161
- Ogoto Shrine
- Ogoto Onsen

== See also ==
- List of railway stations in Japan
