= Oginojō Station =

Railway station in Izumozaki, Niigata Prefecture, Japan

Oginojō Station 小木ノ城駅
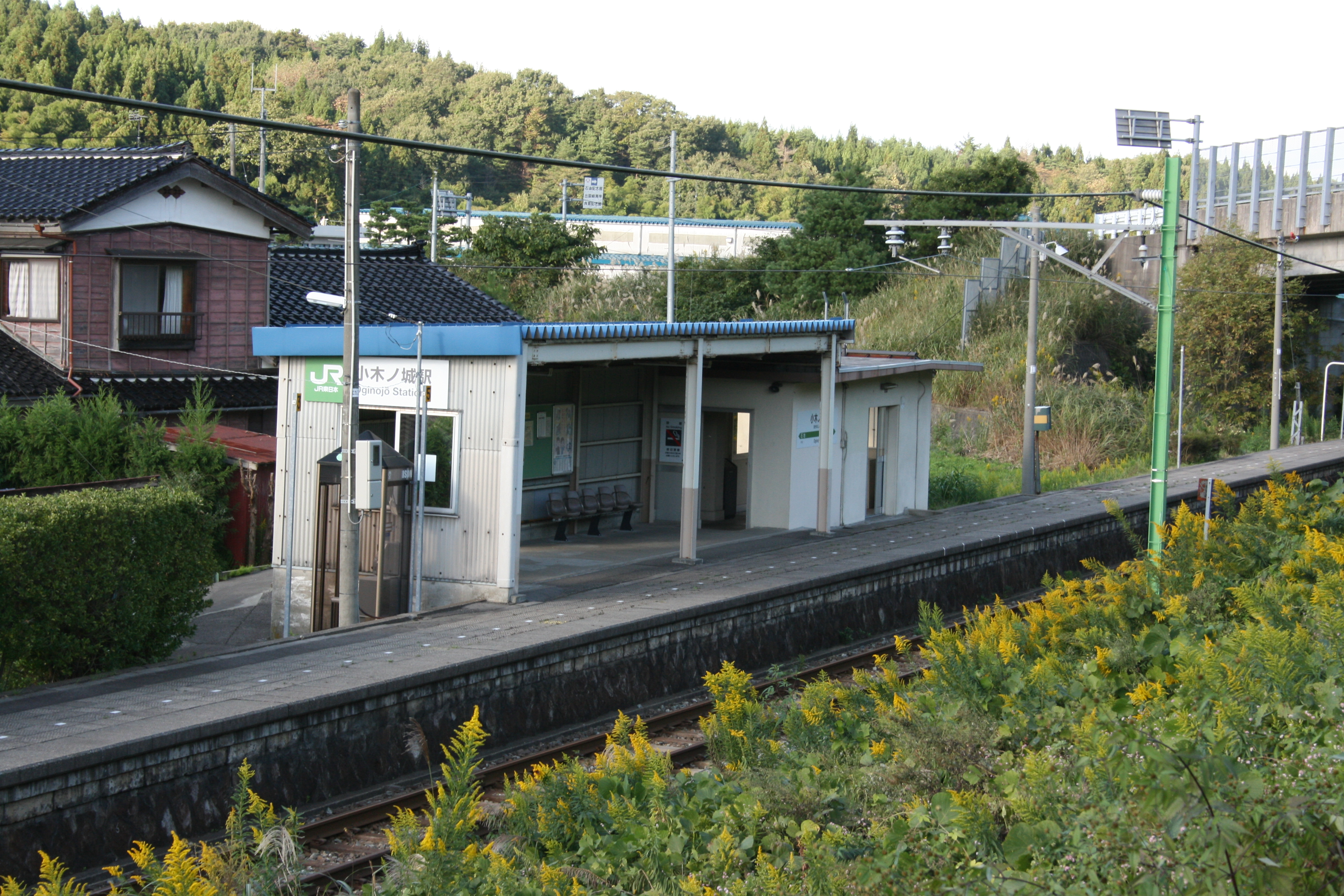
- Oginojō Station, October 2009

General information
- Location: Ogi, Izumosaki-machi, Santo-gun, Niigata-ken 949-4332; Japan
- Coordinates: 37.5154°N 138.7038°E
- Operator: JR East
- Line: ■ Echigo Line
- Distance: 22.7 km from Kashiwazaki
- Platforms: 1 side platform
- Tracks: 1

Other information
- Status: Unstaffed
- Website: Official website

History
- Opened: 25 June 1958

Services
| Preceding station | JR East | Following station |
|---|---|---|
| Ishiji towards Kashiwazaki | Echigo Line | Izumozaki towards Niigata |
Location
- Location within JR Echigo Line Location within Japan

Oginojō Station (小木ノ城駅, Oginojō-eki) is a railway station in the town of Izumozaki, Santō District, Niigata Prefecture, Japan, operated by East Japan Railway Company (JR East).

== Lines ==
Oginojō Station is served by the Echigo Line and is 22.7 kilometers from the terminus of the line at Kashiwazaki Station.

== Station layout ==
The station consists of a single ground-level side platform serving one bi-directional track. There is no station building, but only a waiting room on the platform.

The station is unattended. Suica farecards cannot be used at this station.

== History ==
Oginojō Station opened on 25 June 1958. With the privatization of Japanese National Railways (JNR) on 1 April 1987, the station came under the control of JR East.

== Surrounding area ==
- National Route 116

== See also ==
- List of railway stations in Japan
