= Ōike-Ikoi-no-mori Station =

Railway station in Jōetsu, Niigata Prefecture, Japan

Ōike-Ikoi-no-mori Station 大池いこいの森駅
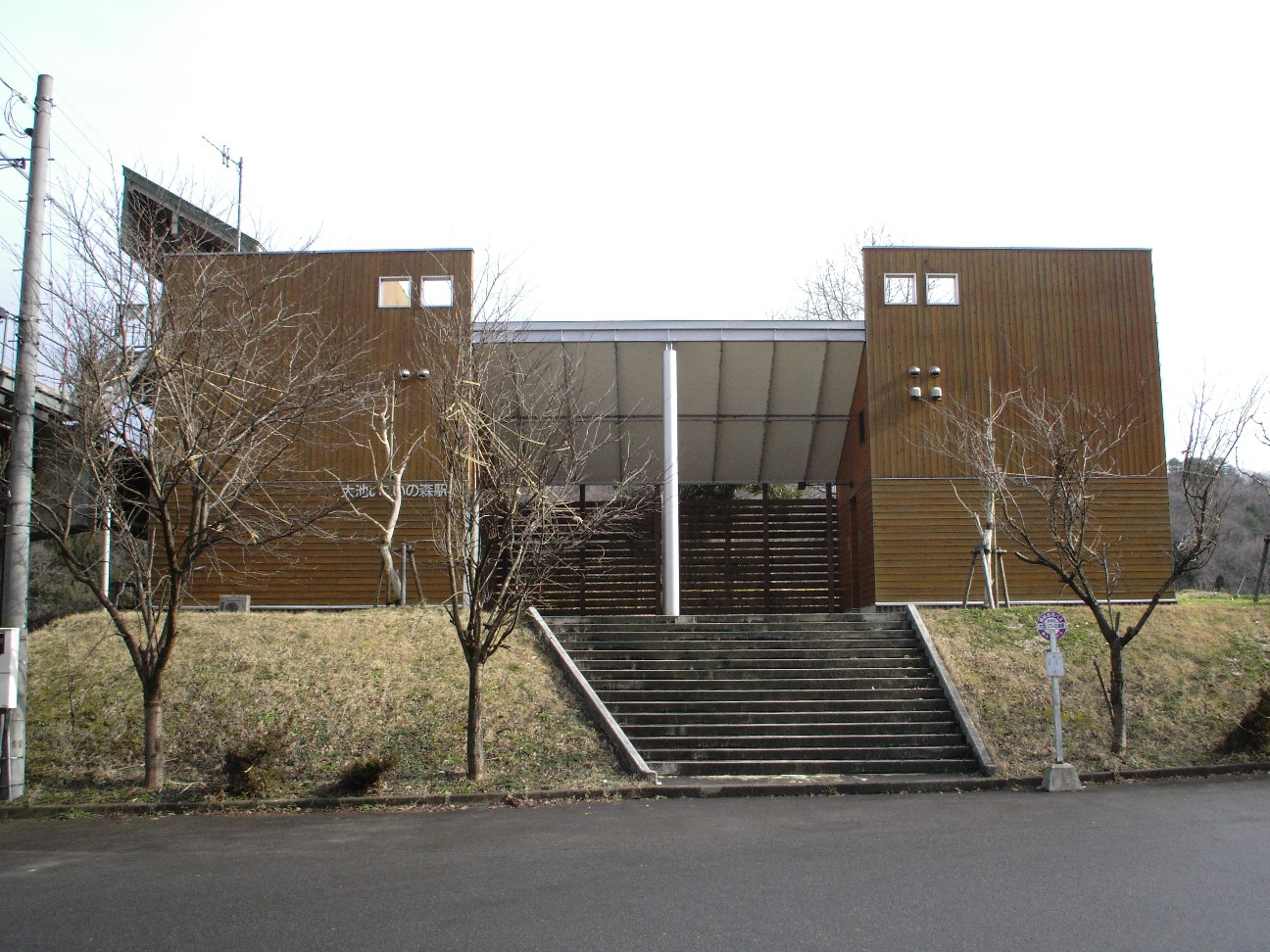
- Ōike-Ikoi-no-mori Station in February 2007

General information
- Location: 1210-3 Ōkamoda, Kubiki-ku, Jōetsu-shi, Niigata-ken 942-0214; Japan
- Coordinates: 37°11′04″N 138°22′24″E
- Operator: Hokuetsu Express
- Line: ■ Hokuhoku Line
- Distance: 51.7 km from Muikamachi
- Platforms: 1 side platform
- Tracks: 1

Other information
- Status: Unstaffed
- Website: Official website

History
- Opened: 22 March 1997; 29 years ago

Passengers
- FY2015: 7 daily
Location
- Location within Hokuhoku Line Location within Japan

Ōike-Ikoi-no-mori Station (大池いこいの森駅, Ōike-Ikoi-no-mori-eki) is a railway station located in the city of Jōetsu, Niigata, Japan.

== Lines ==
Ōike-Ikoi-no-mori Station is served by the Hokuetsu Express Hokuhoku Line and is 51.7 kilometers from the terminus of the line at Muikamachi.

== Station layout ==
The station has one side platform serving a single bi-directional track. The station is unattended.

■ Hokuhoku Line	for Echigo-Yuzawa, Muikamachi, Tōkamachi, Saigata and Naoetsu (bidirectional)

== Adjacent stations ==
«	Service	»
Hokuhoku Line
Uragawara	Local	Kubiki

== History ==
The station opened on 22 March 1997 with the opening of the Hokuhoku Line.

== Passenger statistics ==
In fiscal 2015, the station was used by an average of 7 passengers daily (boarding passengers only).

== Surroundings area ==
- Ōike-Ikoi-no-mori Park
