= Asō Station =

Railway station in Susaki, Kōchi Prefecture, Japan

Asō Station 吾桑駅
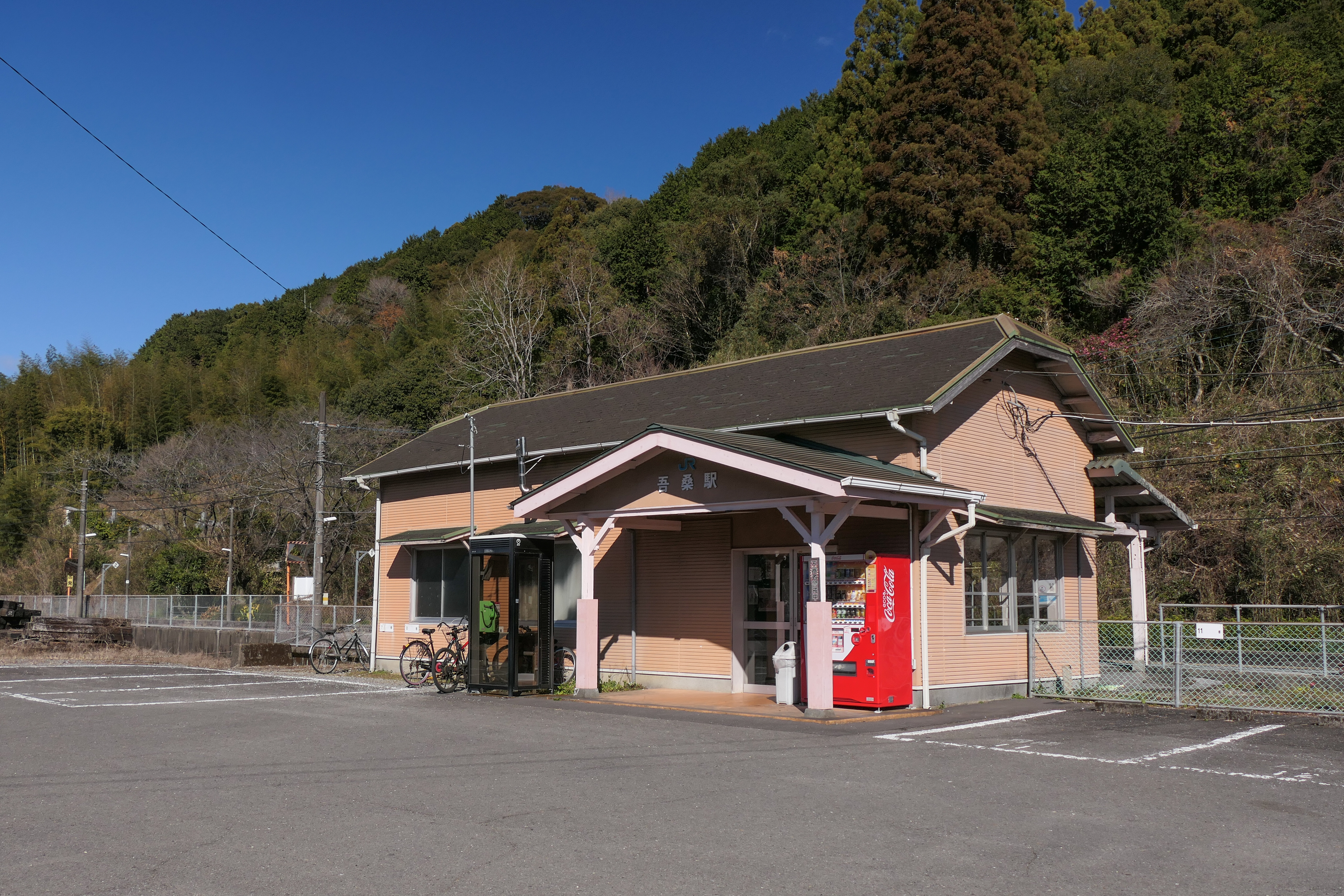
- Asō Station in 2021

General information
- Location: Ainogoko, Susaki-shi, Kōchi-ken 785-0047; Japan
- Coordinates: 33°25′49″N 133°17′43″E
- Operator: JR Shikoku
- Line: ■ Dosan Line
- Distance: 163.4 km from Tadotsu
- Platforms: 2 side platforms
- Tracks: 2 + 1 siding

Construction
- Parking: Available
- Accessible: Yes - platforms linked by ramps and a level crossing

Other information
- Status: Unstaffed
- Station code: K16

History
- Opened: 30 March 1924

Passengers
- FY2019: 84
Location
- Location within Kochi Prefecture Location within Japan

Asō Station (吾桑駅, Asō-eki) is a passenger railway station located in the city of Susaki, Kōchi Prefecture, Japan. It is operated by JR Shikoku and has the station number "K16".

== Lines ==
The station is served by JR Shikoku's Dosan Line and is located 163.4 km from the beginning of the line at Tadotsu.

== Layout ==
The station consists of two opposed side platforms serving two tracks. A station building linked to platform 1 serves as a waiting room. Access to platform 2 across the tracks is by means of ramps and a level crossing. On the other side of platform 1, a siding leads to a freight platform which is used for the loading of sleepers and ballast for track maintenance. The station is unstaffed but a shop sells tickets as a kan'i itaku agent.

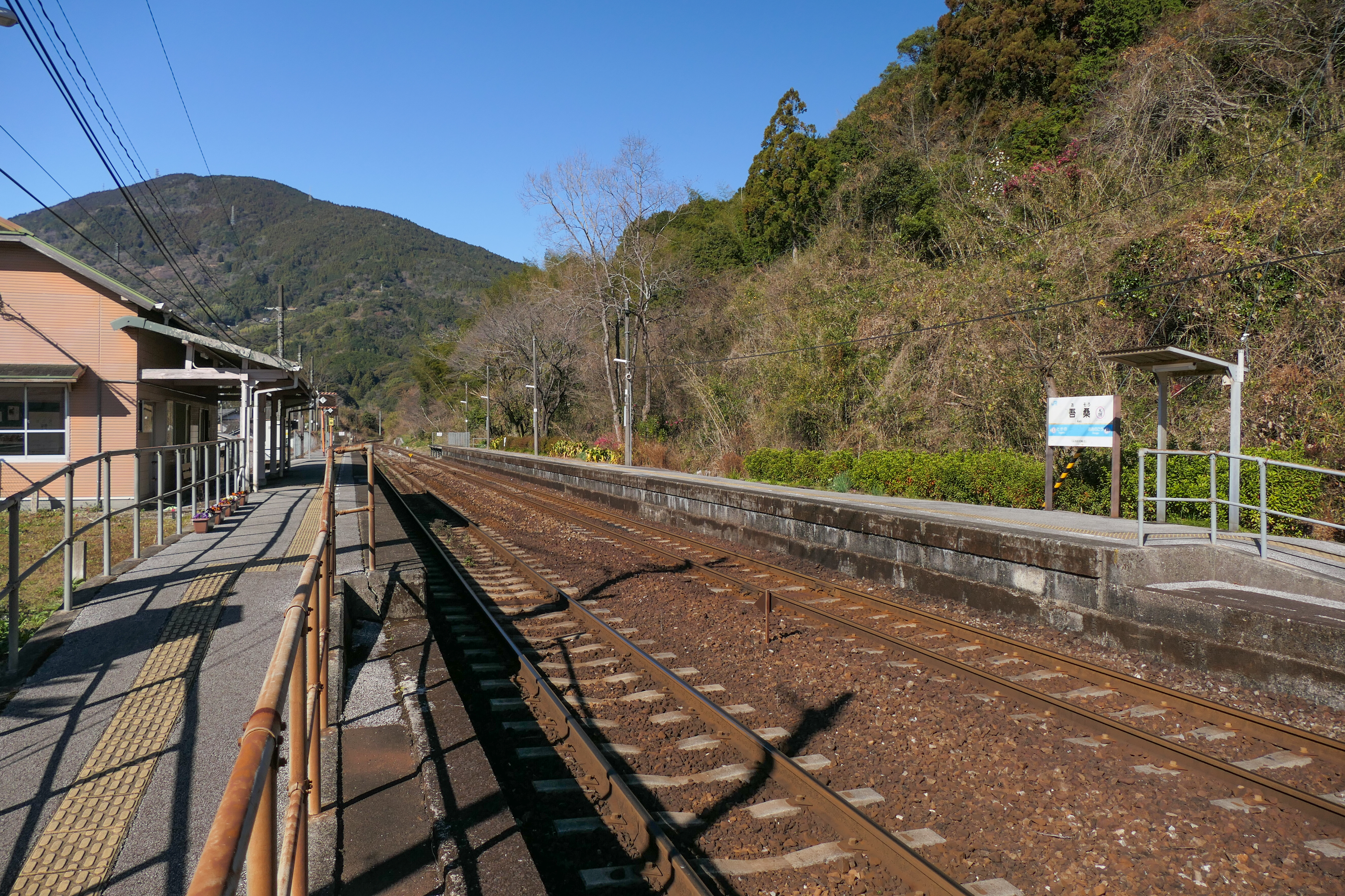
View of the station platforms in 2021

== Adjacent stations ==
«	Service	»
Dosan Line
Togano	Local	Ōnogō

== History ==
The station opened on 30 March 1924 when the then Kōchi Line (later renamed the Dosan Line) was constructed from Susaki to Kusaka. At this time the station was operated by Japanese Government Railways, later becoming Japanese National Railways (JNR). With the privatization of JNR on 1 April 1987, control of the station passed to JR Shikoku.

== Surrounding area ==
- Kuwatayama Onsen

== See also ==
- List of railway stations in Japan
