= Ōtsukyō Station =

Railway station in Ōtsu, Shiga Prefecture, Japan

Ōtsukyō Station 大津京駅
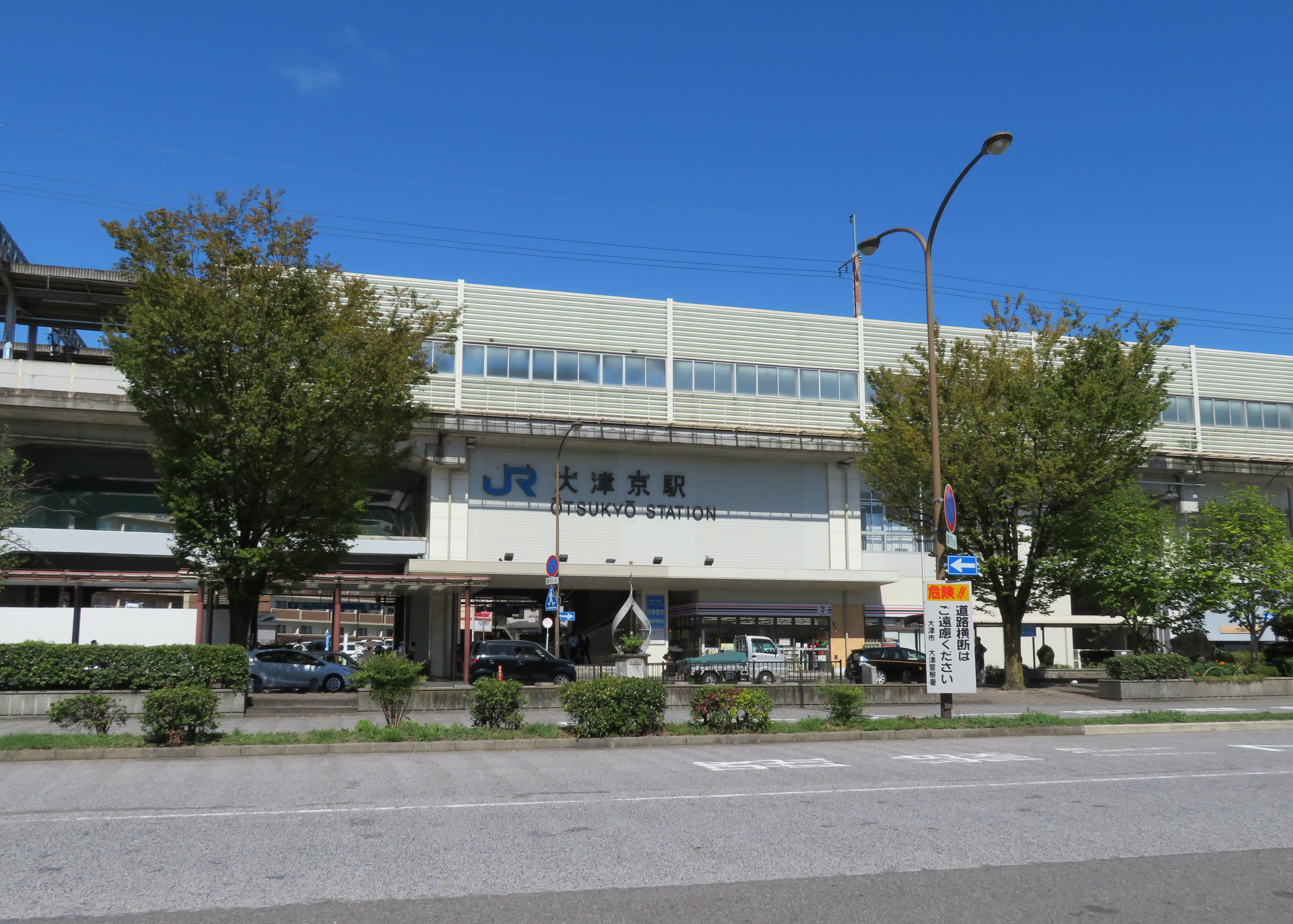
- Ōtsukyō Station, September 2019

General information
- Location: 2-8 Ōjigaoka, Ōtsu-shi, Shiga-ken 520-0025; Japan
- Coordinates: 35.0245°N 135.8575°E
- Operator: JR West
- Line: Kosei Line
- Distance: 5.4 km from Yamashina
- Platforms: 2 island platforms
- Connections: Bus stop

Construction
- Structure type: Elevated
- Accessible: Yes

Other information
- Station code: JR-B29
- Website: Official website

History
- Opened: 20 July 1974
- Former names: Nishi-Ōtsu (to 2008)

Passengers
- FY 2023: 17,994 daily
Location
- Location within Shiga Prefecture Location within Japan

Ōtsukyō Station (大津京駅, Ōtsukyō-eki) is a passenger railway station located in the city of Ōtsu, Shiga Prefecture, Japan, operated by the West Japan Railway Company (JR West).

== Lines ==
Ōtsukyō Station is served by the Kosei Line, and is 5.4 kilometers from the starting point of the line at Yamashina and 10.9 kilometers from Kyoto.

== Station layout ==
The station consists of two elevated island platforms with the station building underneath. The station is staffed.

== Platforms ==
1, 2	■ Kosei Line	for Katata , Ōmi-Imazu and Tsuruga
3, 4	■ Kosei Line	for Kyoto

== Adjacent Stations ==
«	Service	»
Kosei Line
Yamashina	Special Rapid Service	Hieizan Sakamoto
Yamashina	Rapid Service	Hieizan Sakamoto
Yamashina	Local	Karasaki

== History ==
The station opened on July 20, 1974 as Nishi-Ōtsu Station (西大津駅, Nishi-Ōtsu eki) on the Japan National Railway (JNR). The station became part of the West Japan Railway Company on April 1, 1987 due to the privatization and dissolution of the JNR. It was renamed to its present name on March 15, 2008.

Station numbering was introduced in March 2018 with Ōtsukyō being assigned station number JR-B29.

== Passenger statistics ==
In fiscal 2019, the station was used by an average of 9,672 passengers daily (boarding passengers only).

== Surrounding area ==
- Keihan Electric Railway Ishiyama Sakamoto Line Keihan-otsukyo Station
- Otsu City Ojiyama Sports Park
- Ojiyama Athletics Stadium
- Ojiyama Stadium
- Otsu City Hall

== See also ==
- List of railway stations in Japan
