= Ōsawa Station (Yamagata) =

Railway station in Yonezawa, Yamagata Prefecture, Japan

Coordinates: 37°50′14″N 140°12′01″E

Ōsawa Station 大沢駅
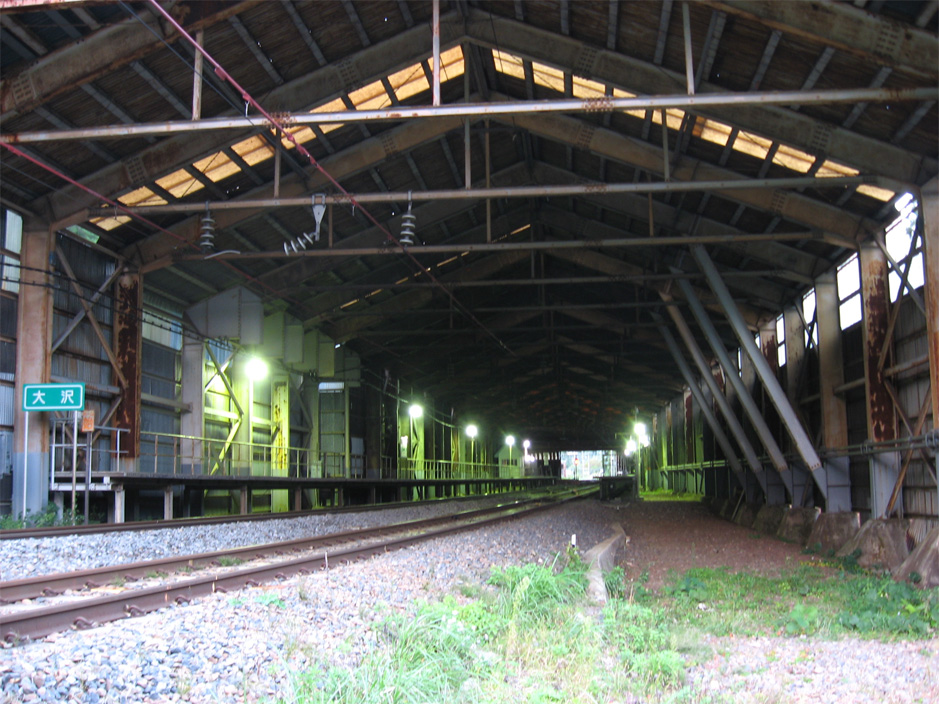
- Ōsawa Station, October 2007

General information
- Location: Ōsawa , Yonezawa, Yamagata-ken 992–1303; Japan
- Operator: JR East
- Line: ■ Ōu Main Line
- Distance: 28.8 km from Fukushima
- Platforms: 2 side platforms

Other information
- Status: Unstaffed
- Website: Official website

History
- Opened: 15 May 1899

Services
Preceding station	JR East	Following station
Tōge towards Fukushima	Yamagata Line	Sekine towards Shinjō
Location
- Location within Yamagata Prefecture Location within Japan

Ōsawa Station (大沢駅, Ōsawa-eki) is a railway station in the city of Yonezawa, Yamagata Prefecture, Japan, operated by East Japan Railway Company (JR East).

== Lines ==
Ōsawa Station is served by the Ōu Main Line, and is located 28.8 rail kilometers from the terminus of the line at Fukushima Station.

== Station layout ==
The station has two opposed unnumbered side platforms connected via a level crossing. The station is located within a snow shelter, due to the very heavy snowfall in the region in winter. The station is unattended.

=== Platforms ===
Entrance side	■ Ōu Main Line	for Fukushima
Opposite side	■ Ōu Main Line	for Yonezawa

== History ==
Ōsawa Station began as a signal stop on 15 May 1899 and was elevated to a full passenger station on 25 December 1906. The station was absorbed into the JR East network upon the privatization of JNR on 1 April 1987.

By 2005, daily ridership had fallen to an average of two users per day.

Due to extremely low ridership, the station was bypassed by all trains between mid-January and late March in 2023–25. In the winter of 2025, trains began bypassing the station on December 1.

== Surrounding area ==
- Kasamatsu Onsen

== See also ==
- List of railway stations in Japan
