= Ozekiyama Station =

Former railway station in Miyoshi, Hiroshima, Japan

Ozekiyama Station 尾関山駅
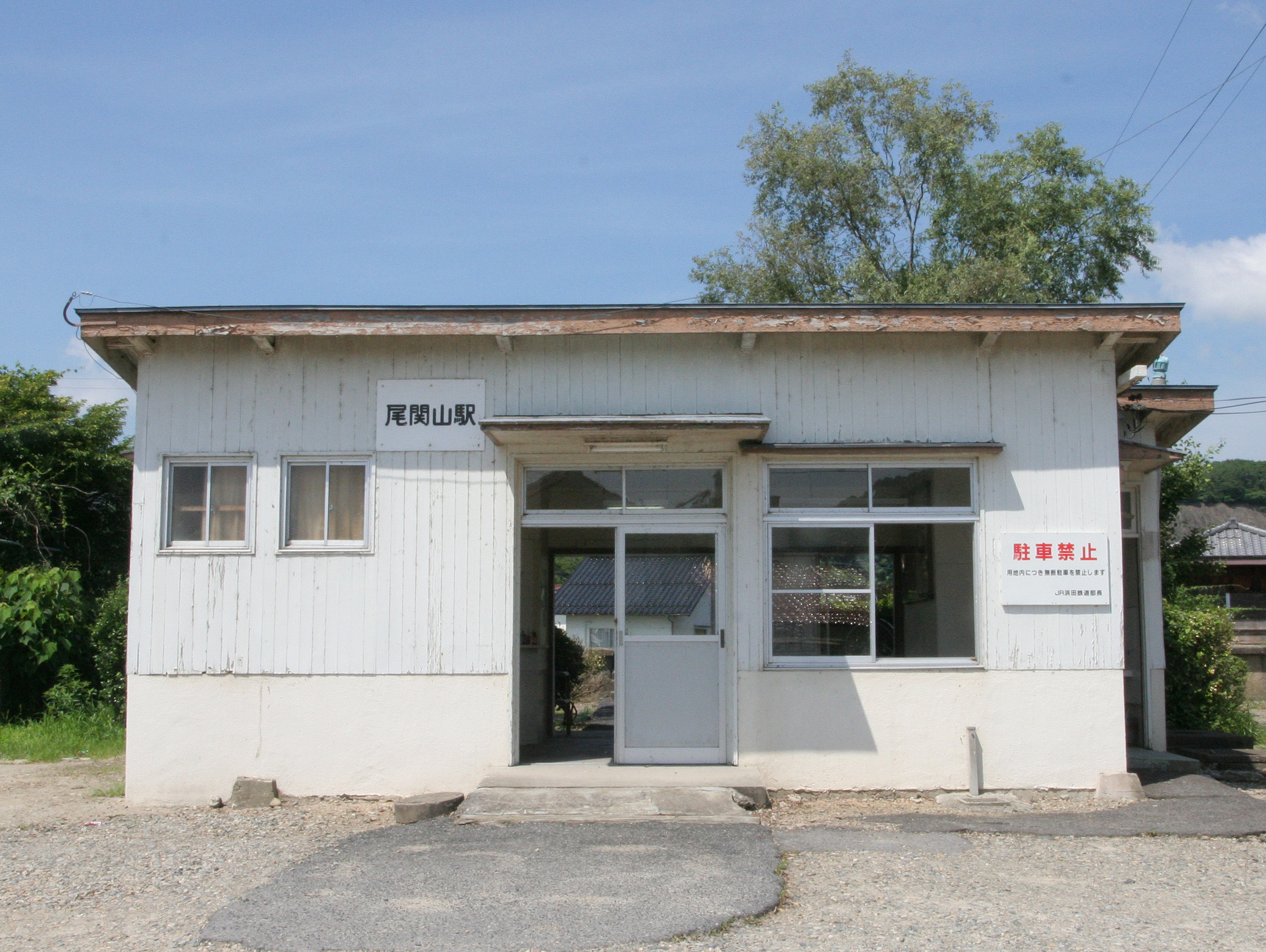
- Ozekiyama Station in July 2008

General information
- Location: 1770 Miyoshi-machi, Miyoshi-gun, Hiroshima-ken; Japan
- Coordinates: 34°48′45″N 132°50′31″E
- Operator: JR West
- Line: F Sankō Line
- Connections: Bus stop

History
- Opened: 1955
- Closed: 31 March 2018
Location
- Location within Japan

Ozekiyama Station (尾関山駅, Ozekiyama-eki) was a railway station on the Sankō Line in Miyoshi, Hiroshima Prefecture, Japan, operated by West Japan Railway Company (JR West). Opened in 1955, the station closed on 31 March 2018 with the closure of the Sanko Line.

== Lines ==
Ozekiyama Station was served by the 108.1 km Sankō Line from Gōtsu in Shimane Prefecture to Miyoshi in Hiroshima Prefecture, which closed on 31 March 2018.

== Adjacent stations ==
«	Service	»
Sankō Line
Awaya	Local	Miyoshi

== History ==
On 16 October 2015, JR West announced that it was considering closing the Sanko Line due to poor patronage. On 29 September 2016, JR West announced that the entire line would close on 31 March 2018. The line then closed on 31 March 2018, with an event hosted by JR West.

== See also ==
- List of railway stations in Japan
