= Ōnogō Station =

Railway station in Susaki, Kōchi Prefecture, Japan

Ōnogō Station 多ノ郷駅
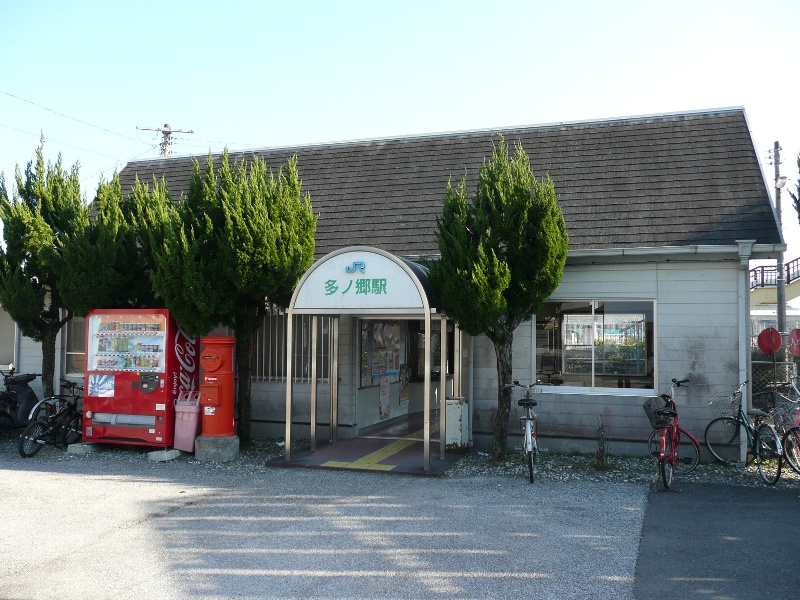
- Ōnogō Station in 2008

General information
- Location: Koda, Susaki-shi, Kōchi-ken 785-0051; Japan
- Coordinates: 33°24′39″N 133°17′41″E
- Operator: JR Shikoku
- Line: ■ Dosan Line
- Distance: 166.1 km from Tadotsu
- Platforms: 2 side platforms
- Tracks: 2

Construction
- Parking: Available
- Accessible: Yes - platforms linked by ramps and a level crossing

Other information
- Status: Unstaffed
- Station code: K17

History
- Opened: 1 June 1947

Passengers
- FY2019: 442
Location
- Location within Kochi Prefecture Location within Japan

Ōnogō Station (多ノ郷駅, Ōnogō-eki) is a passenger railway station located in the city of Susaki, Kōchi Prefecture, Japan. It is operated by JR Shikoku and has the station number "K17".

== Lines ==
The station is served by JR Shikoku's Dosan Line and is located 166.1 km from the beginning of the line at Tadotsu.

In addition to the local trains on the Dosan Line, some trains from the following limited express services also stop at the station:

- Nanpū - Okayama to Kōchi, Nakamura and Sukumo
- Ashizuri - Kōchi to Nakamura and Sukumo

== Layout ==
The station, which is unstaffed, consists of two opposed side platforms serving two tracks. A station building linked to platform 1 serves as a waiting room. Access to platform 2 across the tracks is by means of ramps and a level crossing. A footbridge allows pedestrian access to the station entrance from the main road on the other side of the tracks.

== Adjacent stations ==
«	Service	»
JR Limited Express Services
Sakawa	Nanpū	Susaki
Sakawa	Ashizuri	Susaki
Dosan Line
Asō	Local	Ōma

== History ==
Ōnogō Signal Box (多ノ郷信号場, Ōnogō-shingō-ba) was opened on 20 June 1942 along the existing Dosan Line track. The facility was closed on 1 September 1945 but reopened on 10 July 1946. On 1 June 1947, it was upgraded to a full passenger station. At that time, the station was operated by Japanese National Railways (JNR). With the privatization of JNR on 1 April 1987, control of the station passed to JR Shikoku and JR Freight. Freight operations ceased on 1 October 1992.

== Surrounding area ==
- Sumitomo Osaka Cement Kochi Factory
- Kuroshio Suzaki Hospital

== See also ==
- List of railway stations in Japan
