= Ōma Station =

Railway station in Susaki, Kochi prefecture, Japan

Ōma Station 大間駅
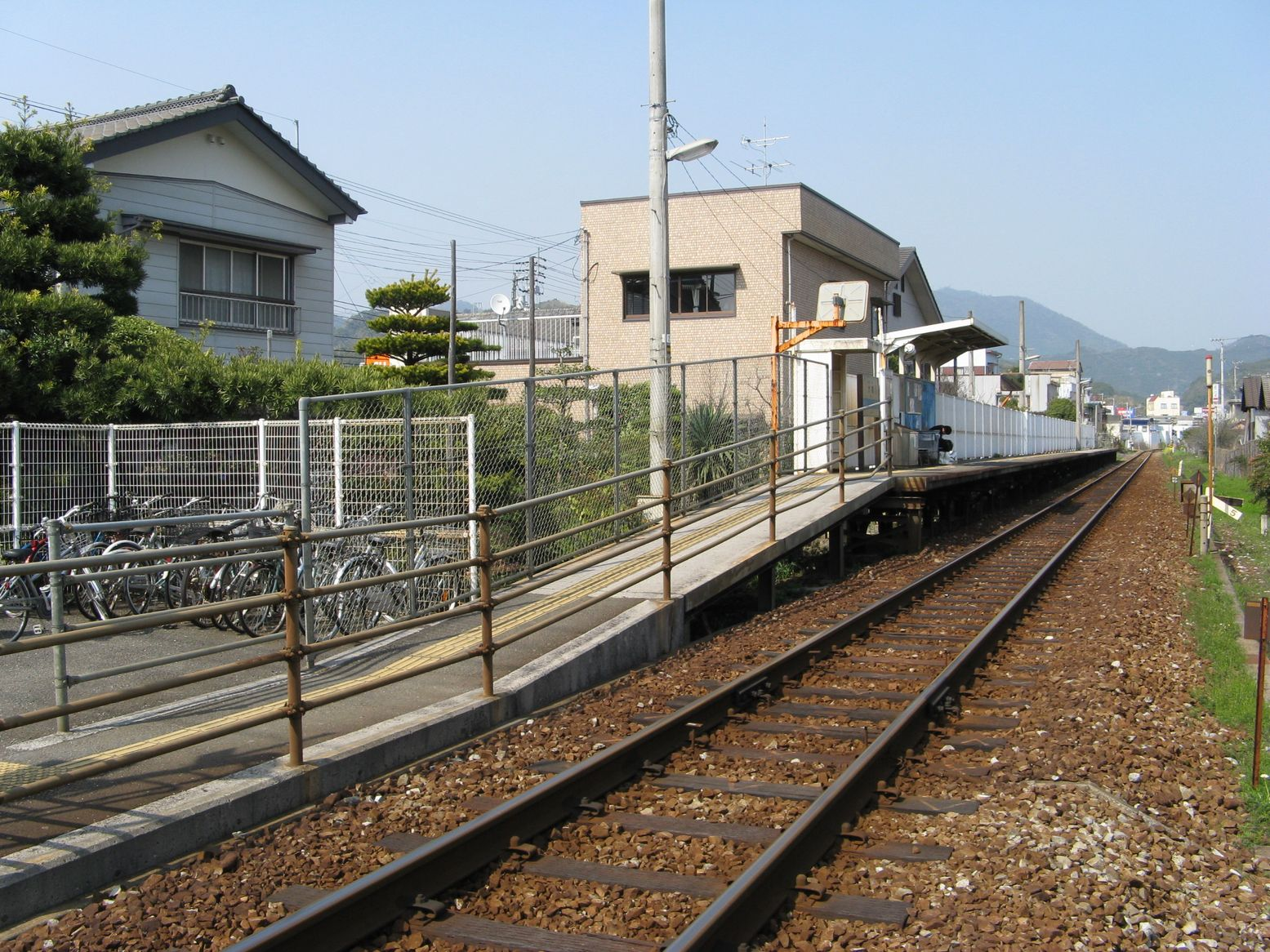
- Ōma Station, March 2008

General information
- Location: 1 Ōnogōkō, Susaki-shi, Kōchi-ken 785-0030; Japan
- Coordinates: 33°24′24″N 133°17′16″E
- Operator: JR Shikoku
- Line: ■ Dosan Line
- Distance: 167.0 km from Tadotsu
- Platforms: 1 side platform
- Tracks: 1

Construction
- Cycle facilities: Bike shed
- Accessible: Yes - ramp leads up to platform

Other information
- Status: Unstaffed
- Station code: K18

History
- Opened: 1 October 1960

Passengers
- FY2019: 434
Location
- Location within Kochi Prefecture Location within Japan

Ōma Station (大間駅, Ōma-eki) is a passenger railway station located in the city of Susaki, Kōchi Prefecture, Japan. It is operated by JR Shikoku and has the station number "K18".

== Lines ==
The station is served by JR Shikoku's Dosan Line and is located 167.0 km from the beginning of the line at Tadotsu.

== Layout ==
The station consists of a side platform serving a single track. There is no station building, only a weather shelter on the platform for waiting passengers. A ramp leads up to the platform from the access road. A bike shed is provided near the station.

== Adjacent stations ==
| « | Service | » |
Dosan Line
| Ōnogō | Local | Susaki |

== History ==
The station opened on 1 October 1960 as a new stop on the existing Dosan Line. At this time the station was operated by Japanese National Railways (JNR). With the privatization of JNR on 1 April 1987, control of the station passed to JR Shikoku.

== Surrounding area ==
- Japan National Route 56

== See also ==
- List of railway stations in Japan
