= Oji-kamiya Station =

Metro station in Tokyo, Japan

Coordinates: 35.764914°N 139.735821°E

Oji-kamiya Station 王子神谷駅

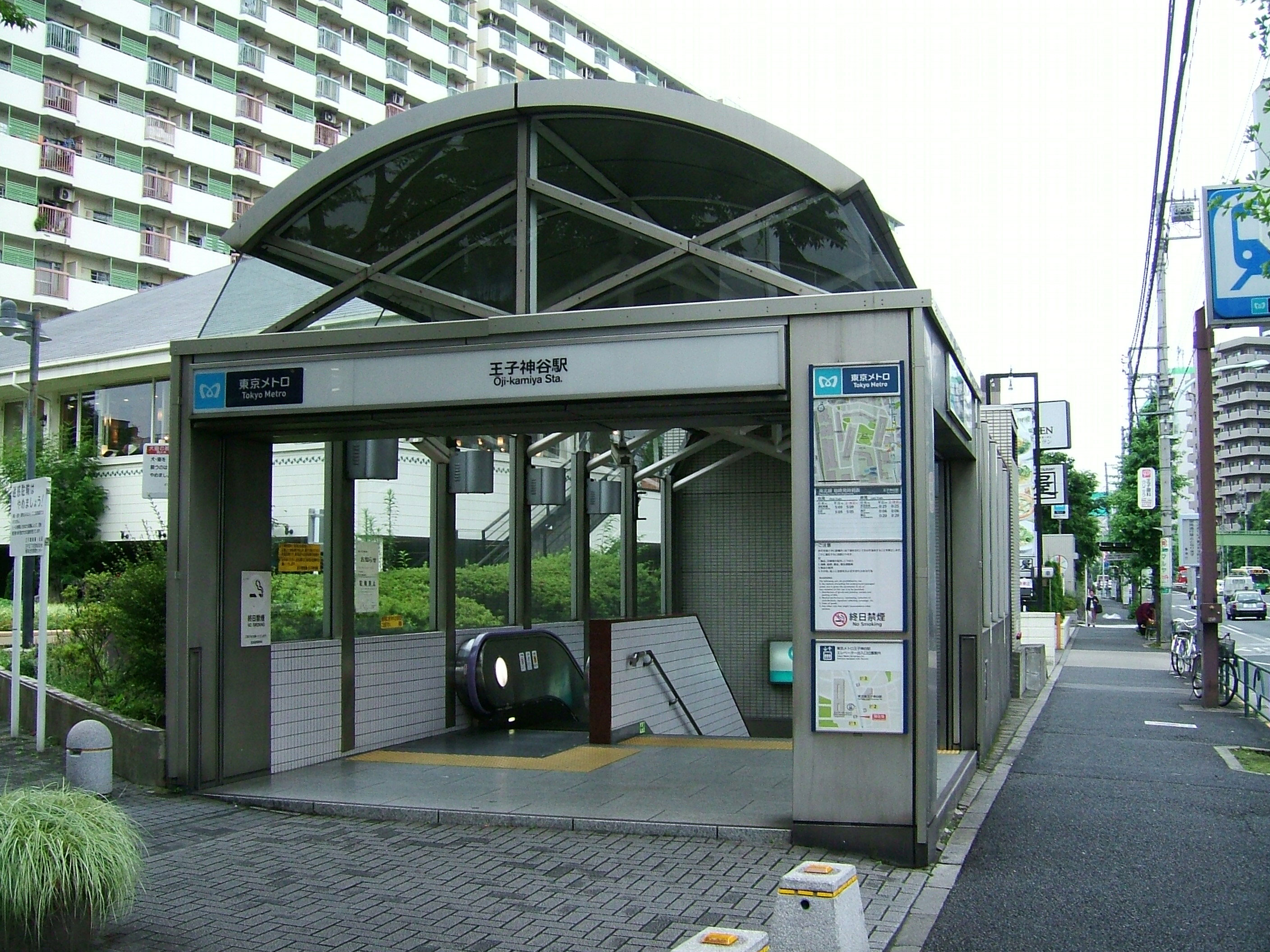
- Oji-kamiya station, 2023

General information
- Location: 2-11 Oji 5-chome, Kita, Tokyo; Japan
- Operator: Tokyo Metro
- Line: Namboku Line
- Platforms: 2 side platforms
- Tracks: 2

Construction
- Structure type: Underground

Other information
- Station code: N-17

History
- Opened: 29 November 1991; 34 years ago

Services
Preceding station	Tokyo Metro	Following station
Ōji towards Meguro	Namboku Line	Shimo towards Akabane-iwabuchi
Location
- Location within Special wards of Tokyo Location within Tokyo Bay and Bōsō Peninsula Location within Tokyo Location within Japan

Oji-kamiya Station (王子神谷駅, Ōji-kamiya eki) is a subway station in the Tokyo Metro network on the Tokyo Metro Namboku Line. It is located in Kita, Tokyo and is numbered N-17.

== Lines ==
- Tokyo Metro Namboku Line (station number N-17)

== Platforms ==
The platforms are configured as two side platforms.

1
2
Namboku Line
Namboku Line
for Akabane-iwabuchi
Saitama Rapid Railway Line for Urawa-misono
- for Iidabashi and Meguro
- Meguro Line for Hiyoshi
- Tokyu Shin-Yokohama Line for Shin-Yokohama Station
- Sotetsu Main Line for Ebina via the Tokyu/Sotetsu Shin-Yokohama Line

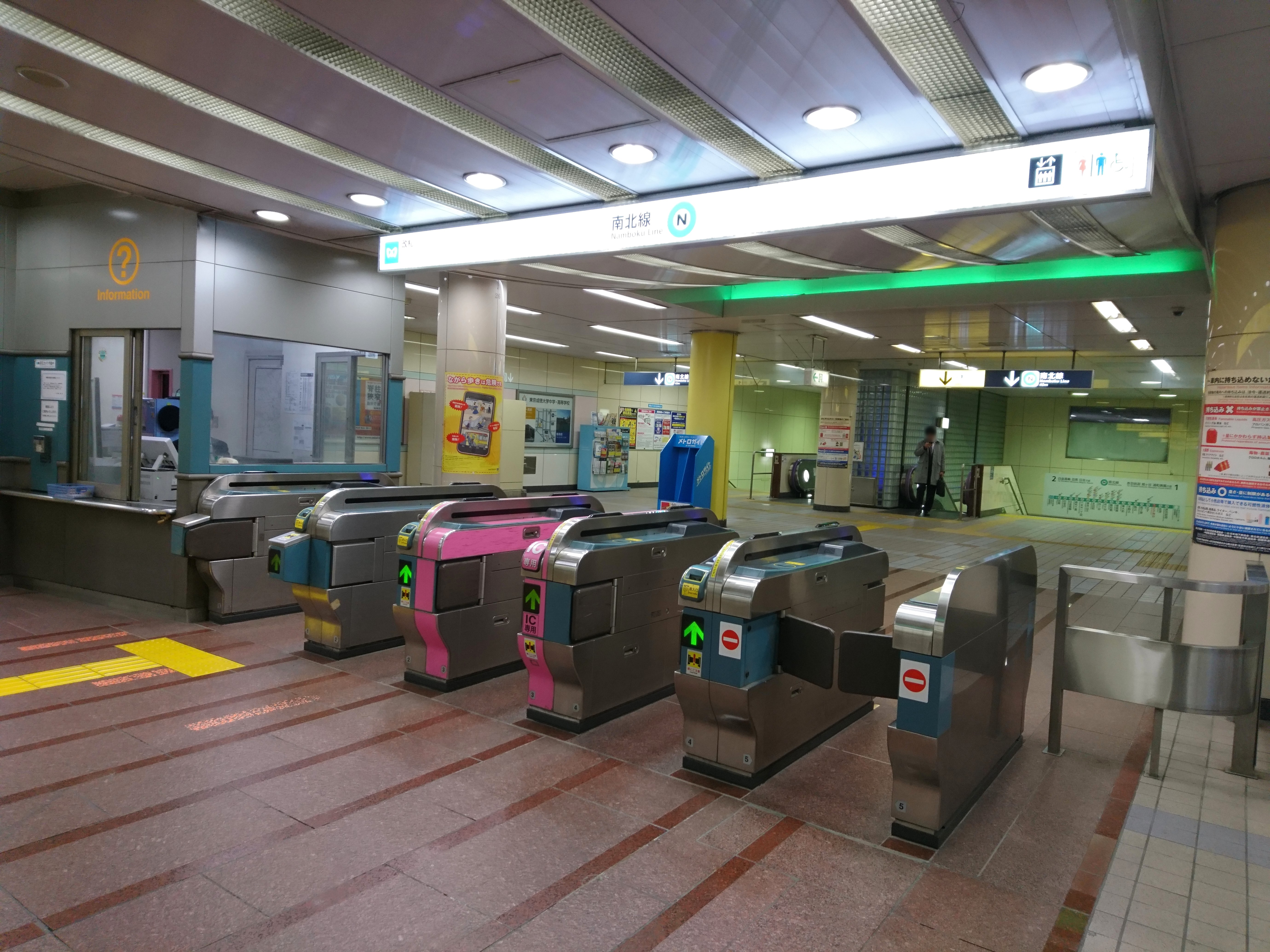
Ticket gate in January 2019

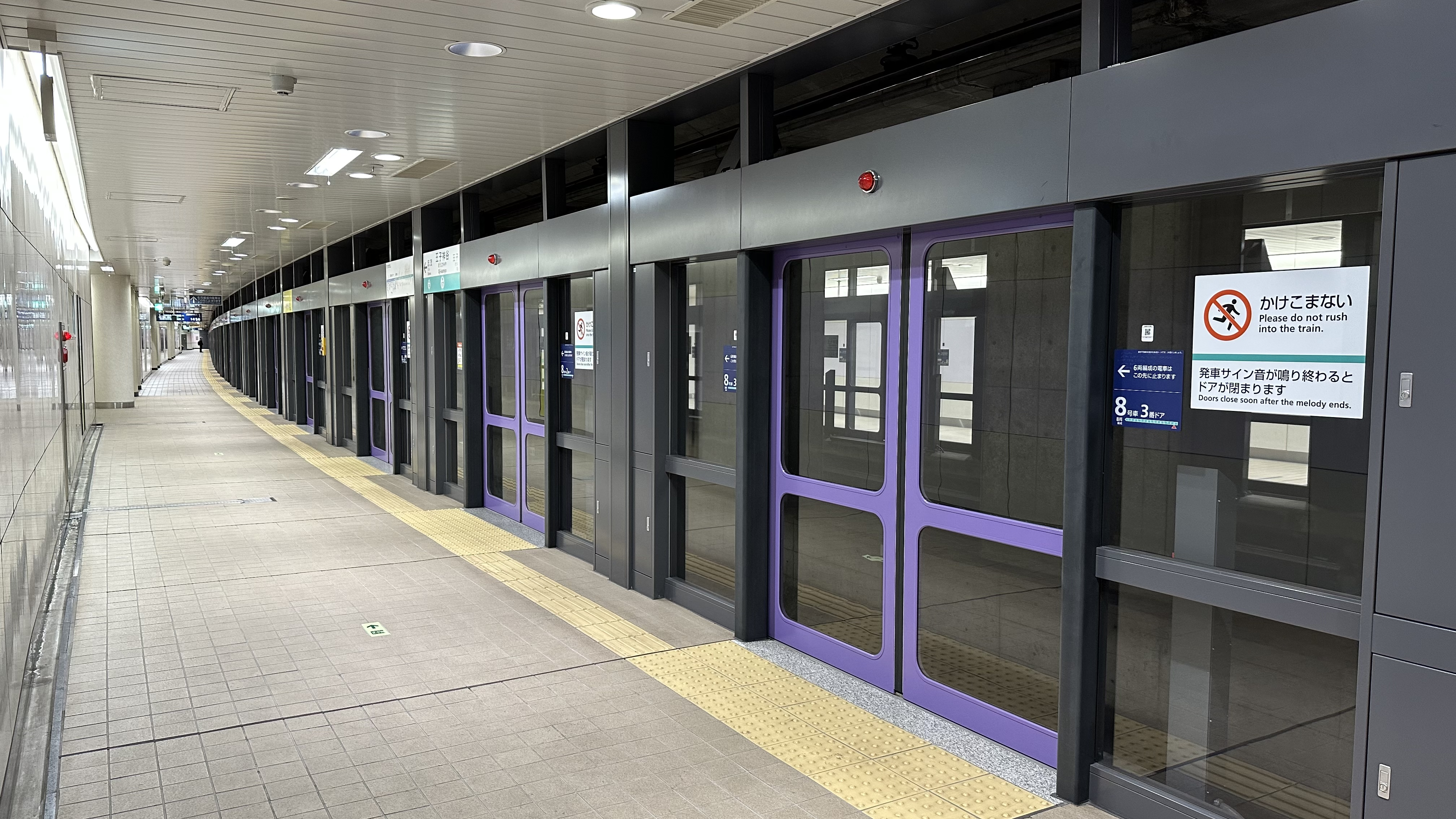
Platform in May 2023

== History ==
Oji-kamiya Station opened on 29 November 1991.

The station facilities were inherited by Tokyo Metro after the privatization of the Teito Rapid Transit Authority (TRTA) in 2004.

The name is derived from the names of the adjacent areas, Oji and Kamiya. The inclusion of “Oji” distinguishes the station from Kamiyacho Station on the Hibiya Line.
