= Rakuraku Biwako =

Japanese train service

Overview
- Service type: Commuter Limited Express
- Status: Operational
- Predecessor: Biwako Liner
- First service: 2 June 2003
- Current operator: JR West

Route
- Termini: Osaka; Kusatsu / Maibara
- Distance travelled: 110.5 km (68.7 mi)
- Average journey time: approx. 1 hr 28 mins (Ōsaka–Maibara)
- Service frequency: 1 morning working from Maibara to Ōsaka; 1 evening working from Ōsaka to Maibara; 1 evening working from Ōsaka to Kusatsu
- Lines used: Tokaido Main Line (Biwako Line and JR Kyoto Line)

On-board services
- Class: Ordinary + Green
- Disabled access: Yes
- Sleeping arrangements: None
- Catering facilities: None
- Observation facilities: None
- Entertainment facilities: None
- Other facilities: Toilets

Technical
- Rolling stock: 681 series EMUs, 683 series EMUs, KiHa 189 series DMUs
- Track gauge: 1,067 mm (3 ft 6 in)
- Electrification: 1,500 V DC overhead
- Operating speed: 130 km/h (81 mph)
- Track owner: JR West

The Rakuraku Biwako (らくラクびわこ, Rakuraku Biwako) is a commuter limited express train service operated by West Japan Railway Company (JR West) between Osaka and Maibara or Kusatsu in Japan since June 2003. It replaced the previous Biwako Liner services.

== Service pattern ==
As of March 2024, one weekday morning service (Rakuraku Biwako 1) runs from Maibara to Osaka, and two weekday evening services (Rakuraku Biwako 2 & 4) run from Osaka to Maibara and Kusatsu respectively, with the journey time from Osaka to Maibara taking approximately 1 hour 28 minutes.

== Rolling stock ==
- 681 series or 683 series 6-car EMU sets
- KiHa 189 series 3-car DMU (since March 2014)

Services were initially operated using the nine-car 681 series or 683 series EMUs used on Thunderbird services.

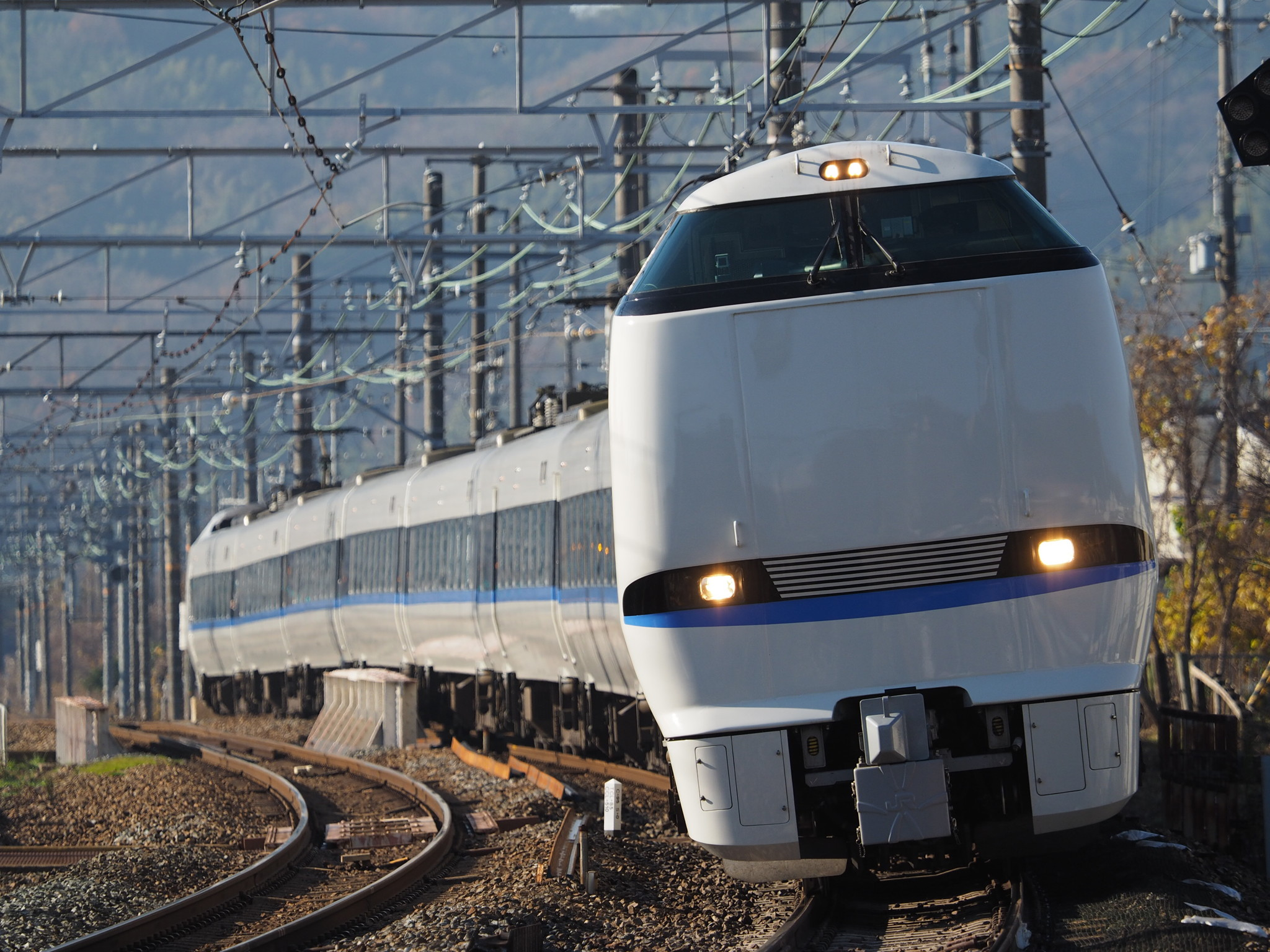
A 683–4000 series EMU

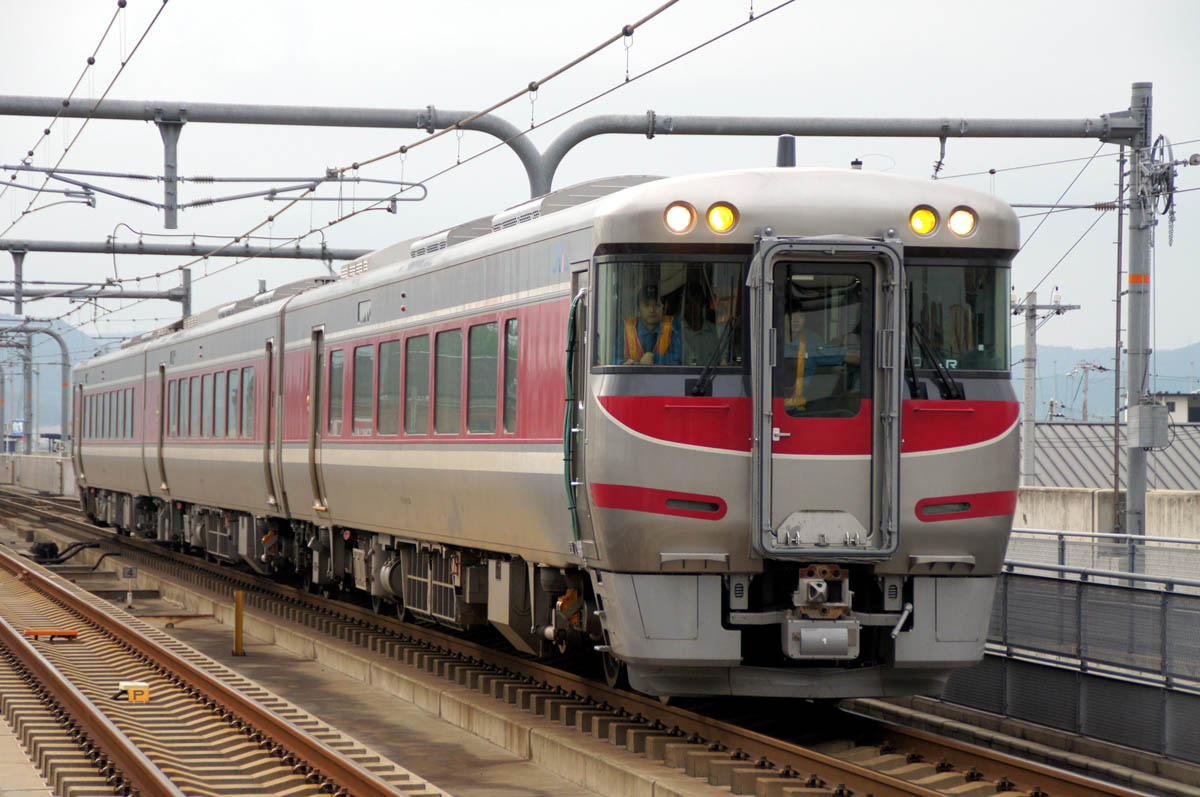
A KiHa 189 series DMU

== Formations ==
=== Rakuraku Biwako 1 and 2 ===
Rakuraku Biwako 1 and 2 (between Osaka and Maibara) are formed as follows, with car 1 at the Maibara end.

Car No.	1	2	3	4	5	6
Accommodation	Green	Reserved	Reserved	Reserved	Reserved	Reserved

- Trains run as 9-car formations on certain days.

=== Rakuraku Biwako 4 ===
Rakuraku Biwako 4 (Osaka to Kusatsu) is formed as follows, with car 1 at the Osaka end.

Car No.	1	2	3
Accommodation	Reserved	Reserved	Reserved
Facilities			Wheelchair-accessible toilet

- All cars are standard class and no-smoking.
- Trains run as 6-car formations during busy periods.

== History ==
The Biwako Express service was introduced from 2 June 2003.

The service was made entirely no-smoking from 1 June 2009.

The service started calling at Minami-Kusatsu Station, and all seats become reserved from 13 March 2021.

Effective the 16 March 2024 timetable revision, all services were renamed to Rakuraku Biwako. At the same time, 9-car 683 series sets operated on this service were replaced with 6-car 681 or 683 series sets.

== See also ==
- List of named passenger trains of Japan
