= Dinostar =

Japanese limited express train service

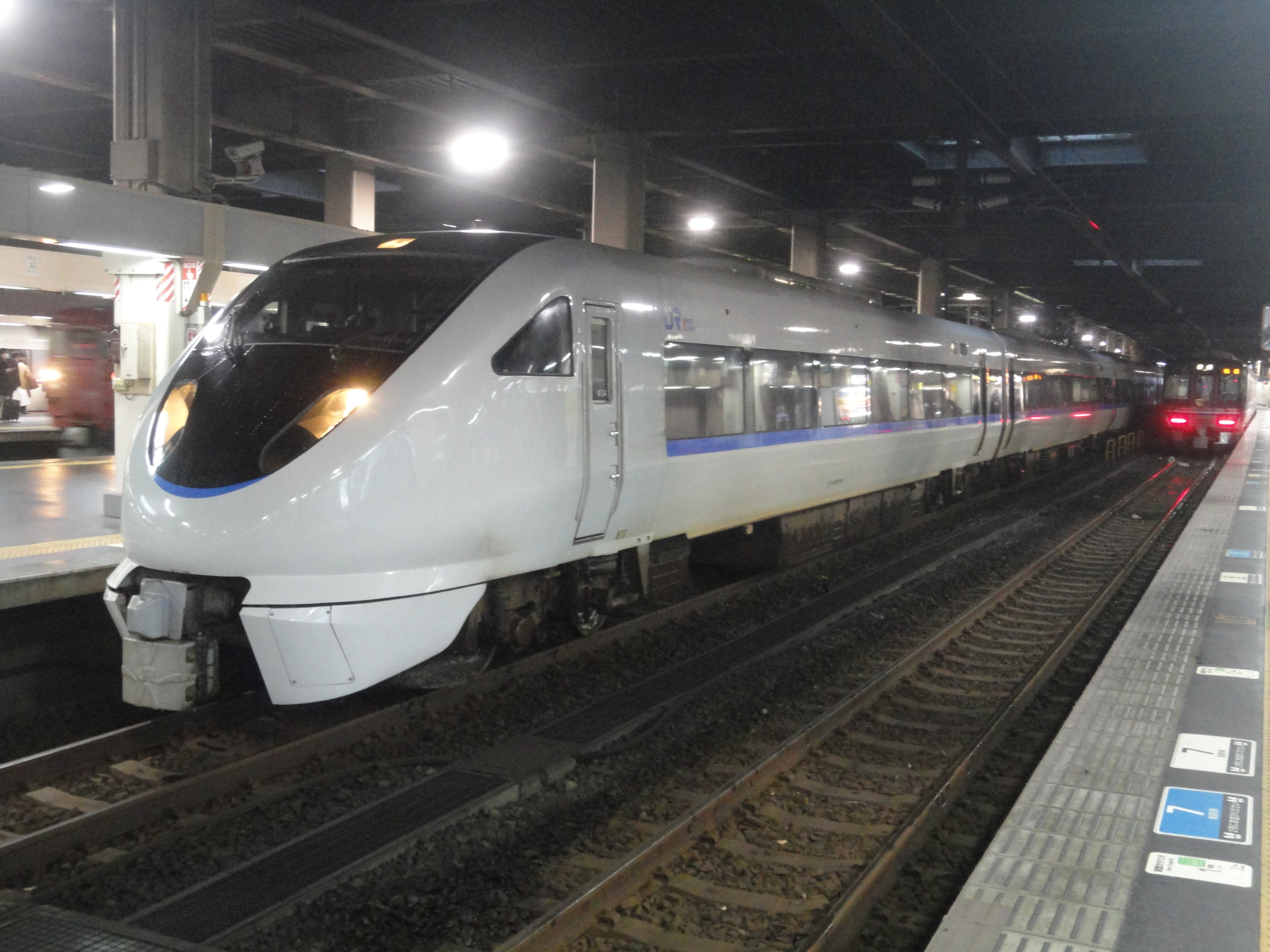
- A 683 series trainset on a Dinostar service, December 2020

Overview
- Service type: Limited express
- Status: Discontinued
- Locale: Japan
- First service: 14 March 2015
- Last service: 15 March 2024
- Successor: Hokuriku Shinkansen
- Current operator: JR West

Route
- Termini: Fukui; Kanazawa
- Service frequency: 3 return services daily
- Line used: Hokuriku Main Line

On-board services
- Class: Ordinary + Green

Technical
- Rolling stock: 681 series, 683 series
- Track gauge: 1,067 mm (3 ft 6 in)

The Dinostar (ダイナスター, Dainasutā) was a limited express train service operated by the West Japan Railway Company (JR West) between Fukui and Kanazawa in Japan via the Hokuriku Main Line from 14 March 2015 until 15 March 2024.

== Service outline ==
Three return services operated daily between Fukui and Kanazawa, supplementing the existing Thunderbird services truncated with the opening of the Hokuriku Shinkansen extension from Nagano to Kanazawa on 14 March 2015.

The name was a portmanteau derived from the English words "dinosaur" for which Fukui is famous and "star".

== Rolling stock ==
The services used the 681 series and 683 series EMUs used on Thunderbird services.

== Formations ==
Trains were normally formed as shown below, with car 1 at the Kanazawa (eastern) end. All cars were no-smoking.

Car No.	1	2	3	4	5	6
Accommodation	Green	Reserved	Reserved	Reserved	Non-reserved	Non-reserved

From the start of the revised timetable introduced on 26 March 2016, some services (Dinostar 1 and 6) operated as three-car formations with no Green car.

== History ==
The name of the new train services was officially announced by JR West's Kanazawa Division on 7 October 2014.

From the start of the revised timetable that took place on 16 March 2024, all Dinostar services were discontinued with the extension of the Hokuriku Shinkansen to Tsuruga.

== See also ==
- List of named passenger trains of Japan
