= List of named passenger trains of Japan =

This article contains lists of named passenger trains in Japan.

== Shinkansen (bullet trains) ==
Train name	Name meaning	Operator	Train endpoints	Operated	Maximum operating speed (km/h)	Japan Rail Pass coverage
Aoba	refers to Aoba Castle	JR East	Tokyo – Sendai	1982–1997	240	Service discontinued
Asahi	Morning sun	JR East	Tokyo – Niigata	1982–2004	275	Service discontinued
Asama	refers to Mount Asama	JR East	Tokyo – Nagano	1998–	275	Yes
Hakutaka	White hawk	JR East / JR-West	Tokyo – Tsuruga	2015–	275	Yes
Hayabusa	Peregrine falcon	JR East / JR Hokkaido	Tokyo – Shin-Hakodate-Hokuto	2011–	320	Yes
Hayate	Strong wind	JR East / JR Hokkaido	Morioka – Shin-Hakodate-Hokuto	2002– 2002-2019 (Tokyo to Morioka)	275	Yes
Hikari	Light	JR Central / JR-West	Tokyo – Hiroshima and Nagoya – Hakata	1964–	Tokaido Shinkansen: 285; Sanyo Shinkansen: 300	Yes
Hikari Rail Star	Light – Rail Star	JR-West	Shin-Ōsaka – Hakata	2000–	285	Yes
Kagayaki	Glitter	JR East / JR-West	Tokyo – Tsuruga	2015–	275	Yes
Kamome	Seagull	JR Kyushu	Nagasaki – Takeo-Onsen	2022–	260	Yes
Kodama	Echo	JR Central / JR-West	Tokyo – Shin-Ōsaka and Shin-Ōsaka – Hakata	1964–	285	Yes
Komachi	Beauty	JR East	Tokyo – Akita	1997–	320	Yes
Mizuho	Harvest, also an ancient name of Japan	JR Kyushu / JR-West	Shin-Ōsaka – Kagoshima-Chūō	2011–	300	No
Nasuno	refers to Nasu highlands	JR East	Tokyo – Kōriyama	1995–	275	Yes
Nozomi	Hope	JR Central / JR-West	Tokyo – Shin-Ōsaka, Hakata	1992–	Tokaido Shinkansen: 285; Sanyo Shinkansen: 300	No
Sakura	Cherry blossom	JR Kyushu / JR-West	Shin-Ōsaka – Kagoshima-Chūō	2011–	300	Yes
Tanigawa	refers to Mount Tanigawa	JR East	Tokyo – Echigo-Yuzawa	1997–	240	Yes
Toki	Crested ibis	JR East	Tokyo – Niigata	1982–1997; 2004–	275	Yes
Tsubame	Barn swallow	JR Kyushu	Hakata – Kagoshima-Chūō	2004–	260	Yes
Tsubasa	Wings	JR East	Tokyo – Shinjō	1992–	275	Yes
Tsurugi	refers to Mount Tsurugi	JR-West	Toyama – Tsuruga	2015–	260	Yes
Yamabiko	Mountain echo	JR East	Tokyo – Morioka	1982–	275	Yes

== Daytime trains ==
=== Limited express (partial list) ===
Train name	Name meaning	Operator	Train endpoints	Operated
A-Train	refers to Ariake region	JR Kyushu	Yoshizuka, Hakata – Nagasu	1967–
Aizu Liner	refers to Aizu region	JR East	Kōriyama – Aizu-Wakamatsu	1968–
Akagi / Swallow Akagi	refers to Mt. Akagi	JR East	Ueno, Shinjuku – Takasaki, Maebashi	1982–
Ariake	refers to Ariake region	JR Kyushu	Kumamoto – Misumi	1967–2021
Asagiri	Morning mist	Odakyu / JR Central	Shinjuku – Gotemba	1991–2018
Ashizuri	refers to Cape Ashizuri	JR Shikoku	Kōchi – Nakamura	1990–
Ayame	Japanese iris	JR East	Tokyo – Narita, Kashimajingū, Chōshi	1975–2015
Azusa	refers to Azusa River	JR East	Shinjuku, Tokyo, Chiba – Matsumoto, Hakuba	1966–
Banetsu Monogatari	refers to Banetsu West Line	JR East	Niigata - Aizu-Wakamatsu	1999–
Dinostar	portmanteau derived from the English word "dinosaur" for which Fukui is famous and the word "star"	JR-West	Fukui – Kanazawa	2015–2024
Enoshima	refers to Enoshima	Odakyu	Shinjuku – Fujisawa – Katase-Enoshima	1964–
Fuji Excursion		JR East	Shinjuku – Kawaguchiko	2019–
Fujikawa	refers to Fuji River	JR Central	Kōfu – Shizuoka	1996–
Hachiōji / Ōme		JR East	Tokyo – Hachiōji,Ōme	2019–2025
Hakone / Super Hakone / Metro Hakone	refers to Hakone	Odakyu	Shinjuku, Kita-Senju – Hakone-Yumoto	1950–
Hakuchō / Super Hakuchō	Swan	JR East / JR Hokkaido	Shin-Aomori, Aomori – Hakodate	2002–2016
Hamakaze	Sea breeze/beach wind	JR-West	Ōsaka – Kasumi, Hamasaka, Tottori	1972–
Haruka	Faraway	JR-West	Kyoto/Shin-Ōsaka – Kansai Airport	1993–
Hashidate	-	JR-West, Willer Trains	Kyoto – Amanohashidate, Toyooka	1965–
Hida	refers to Hida	JR Central	Ōsaka, Nagoya – Takayama, Hida Furukawa, Toyama	1968–
Hitachi	old name of Ibaraki Prefecture	JR East	Shinagawa – Sendai	1969–
Hitoyoshi	name of Hitoyoshi, Kumamoto	JR Kyushu	Kumamoto – Hitoyoshi	2009–2024
Hokuto	Big Dipper	JR Hokkaido	Hakodate – Sapporo	1965–
Homeway / Metro Homeway	-	Odakyu	Shinjuku, Kita-Senju, Ōtemachi – Machida, Sagami-Ōno, Hon-Atsugi, Odawara, Hakone-Yumoto, Karakida, Fujisawa, Katase-Enoshima	1999–
Huis Ten Bosch	-	JR Kyushu	Hakata – Huis Ten Bosch	1992–
Inaho	Rice stalk	JR East	Niigata – Sakata, Akita	1969–
Inaji	Way to Ina, refers to Ina region	JR Central	Toyohashi – Iida	1996–
Ishizuchi	Refers to Mt. Ishizuchi	JR Shikoku	Takamatsu – Matsuyama	1988–
Iyonada Monogatari	Story of the Iyonada Sea; refers to Iyo, old name of Ehime Prefecture	JR Shikoku	Matsuyama – Iyo-Ōzu, Yawatahama	2014–
Kaiji	Way to Kai, old name of Yamanashi Prefecture	JR East	Tokyo, Shinjuku – Kōfu, Ryūō	1988–
Kaio	refers to Kaiō Hiroyuki, a celebrity sumo wrestler from Nōgata	JR Kyushu	Hakata – Nōgata	2001–
Kamome	Seagull	JR Kyushu	Hakata – Saga, Hizen-Kashima, Nagasaki and Haiki – Nagasaki	1961–
Kamoshika	Japanese serow	JR East	Akita – Aomori	1997–2010
Kamui	Kamuy	JR Hokkaido	Sapporo – Asahikawa	2007–
Kawasemi Yamasemi	refers to kingfishers native to the area	JR Kyushu	Kumamoto-Hitoyoshi	2017-
Kinosaki	refers to Kinosaki Onsen	JR-West	Kyoto – Kinosaki Onsen	1996–
Kinugawa / Spacia Kinugawa	refers to Kinugawa River	JR East / Tobu Railway	Shinjuku – Kinugawa-Onsen	2006–
Kirameki	Glitter	JR Kyushu	Hakata – Kokura, Mojikō	2001–
Kirishima	refers to Mount Kirishima	JR Kyushu	Miyazaki – Miyakonojō, Nishi-Miyakonojō, Kagoshima-Chūō and Kokubu – Kagoshima-Chūō	1995–
Kita-Kinki	North Kinki	JR-West	Shin-Ōsaka, Fukuchiyama – Toyooka, Kinosaki Onsen	1986–2011
Kounotori	Stork	JR-West	Shin-Ōsaka – Fukuchiyama, Toyooka, Kinosaki Onsen	2011–
Kumagawa	refers to Kuma River	JR Kyushu	Kumamoto – Hitoyoshi	2004–
Kuroshio	Kuroshio Current	JR-West	Kyoto, Shin-Ōsaka, Tennōji – Wakayama, Shirahama, Shingu	1965–
Kusatsu/Shima	refers to Kusatsu Onsen	JR East	Ueno – Naganoharakusatsuguchi	1985–
Lilac	-	JR Hokkaido	Sapporo – Asahikawa	1980–2007; 2017–
Mahoroba,Rakuraku Yamato		JR West	Osaka,Shin-Ōsaka – Nara	Mahoroba: 2010;2019- Rakuraku Yamato: 2024-
Midori	Green	JR Kyushu	Hakata – Sasebo	1976–
Muroto	refers to Cape Muroto	JR Shikoku	Tokushima – Mugi	1962-2025
Nanki	refers to South Kii Peninsula	JR Central	Nagoya – Shingū, Kii-Katsuura	1978–
Nanpū	Southern wind	JR Shikoku	Okayama – Kōchi	1972–
Narita Express	-	JR East	Tokyo area – Narita Airport	1991–
Nikkō / Spacia Nikkō	refers to Nikkō	JR East / Tōbu	Shinjuku – Tōbu-Nikko	2006–
Noto Kagaribi	Noto fire built in an iron basket	JR-West	Kanazawa – Wakuraonsen	2015–
Odoriko / Super View Odoriko / Saphir Odoriko	refers to The Dancing Girl of Izu	JR East / Izukyū / Izuhakone Railway	Tokyo, Shinjuku, Ikebukuro – Itō, Izukyū Shimoda, Shuzenji	Odoriko: 1981- Super View Odoriko: 1990–2020 Saphir Odoriko: 2020-
Ohayo Express / Oyasumi Express	Good morning express / Good night express	JR-West	Tsuruga – Kanazawa	Ohayo Express: 2001–2024; Oyasumi Express: 2004–2024
Ohayo Tochigi / Hometown Tochigi	Good morning Tochigi / -	JR East	Shinjuku – Utsunomiya, Kuroiso	1995–2010
Okhotsk	refers to Sea of Okhotsk	JR Hokkaido	Sapporo – Asahikawa - Abashiri	1972–
Ozora	Sky	JR Hokkaido	Sapporo – Kushiro	1961–
Rakuraku Biwako		JR West	Osaka – Kusatsu,Maibara	2003-
Rakuraku Harima		JR West	Kyoto,Shin-Ōsaka – Aboshi	2019-
Relay Tsubame	Swallow	JR Kyushu	Hakata – Shin-Yatsushiro	2004–2011
Relay Kamome	-	JR Kyushu	Hakata - Takeo-Onsen	2023-
Sagami / Metro Sagami	refers to Sagami, old name of Kanagawa Prefecture	Odakyu	Shinjuku, Kita-Senju – Machida, Sagami-Ōno, Hon-Atsugi, Odawara	1950–
Sarobetsu	refers to Sarobetsu plain	JR Hokkaido	Asahikawa – Wakkanai	2017–
Sazanami	Ripples	JR East	Tokyo – Kimitsu	1972–
Shimanto	refers to Shimanto River	JR Shikoku	Takamatsu – Kōchi, Sukumo	1988–
Shinano	refers to Shinano region, old name of Nagano Prefecture	JR Central	Nagoya – Nagano	1968–
Shiokaze	Sea breeze	JR Shikoku	Okayama – Imabari, Matsuyama	1972–
Shiosai	-	JR East	Tokyo, Shinjuku – Sakura, Narutō, Chōshi	1975–
Shirasagi	Egret	JR-West	Nagoya, Maibara – Tsuruga	1964–
Shirayuki	White snow	JR East	Niigata – Jōetsumyōkō,Arai	2015–
Shōnan	refers to Shōnan region	JR East	Tokyo,Shinjyuku – Hiratsuka,Odawara	2021–
Skyliner	-	Keisei	Keisei Ueno – Narita Airport	1972–
Sonic	-	JR Kyushu	Hakata – Yanagigaura, Ōita, Saiki (via Nippō Main Line)	1997–
Soya	refers to Soya region	JR Hokkaido	Sapporo – Asahikawa - Wakkanai	2000–
Super Hakuto	White hare, i.e. Hare of Inaba	JR-West, Chizu Express	Kyoto – Tottori - Kurayoshi	1994–
Super Inaba	refers to Inaba, old name of Tottori Prefecture. Also Hare of Inaba	JR-West, Chizu Express	Okayama – Tottori	1993–
Super Matsukaze	Pine wind	JR-West	Tottori – Masuda	2003–
Super Oki	refers to Oki Islands	JR-West	Tottori – Yonago, Shin-Yamaguchi	2001–
Super White Arrow	-	JR Hokkaido	New Chitose Airport, Sapporo – Asahikawa	1986–2007
Suzuran	Lily of the valley	JR Hokkaido	Muroran – Sapporo	1992–
Taisetsu	another name of Mt. Daisetsu	JR Hokkaido	Asahikawa - Abashiri	2017–2025
Thunderbird	-	JR-West	Ōsaka – Tsuruga	1995–
Tokachi	refers to Tokachi region	JR Hokkaido	Sapporo – Obihiro	1990–
Tōkai	refers to Tokai region	JR Central	Tokyo – Shizuoka	1996–2007
Tokiwa	old name of Ibaraki Prefecture	JR East	Shinagawa – Tsuchiura, Katsuta, Iwaki, Takahagi	2015–
Trans-Kyushu Limited Express	-	JR Kyushu	Beppu – Hitoyoshi, Kumamoto	2004–
Tsugaru	old name of Aomori Prefecture	JR East	Akita – Aomori	2002–
Tsurugisan	refers to Mount Tsurugi	JR Shikoku	Tokushima – Awa-ikeda	1996–
Umisachi Yamasachi	refers to Hoderi, whose myth supposedly takes place in Southern Kyushu	JR Kyushu	Miyazaki-Nangō	2009-
Uwakai	refers to Sea of Uwa	JR Shikoku	Matsuyama – Uwajima	1990–
Uzushio	refers to Naruto whirlpools	JR Shikoku	Takamatsu – Tokushima	1988–
Wakashio	Growing tide from neap tide to spring tide, also another name of Kuroshio Current	JR East	Shinjuku – Kazusa-Ichinomiya, Katsuura, Awa-Kamogawa	1972–
Yakumo	thick clouds	JR-West	Okayama – Izumoshi	1972–
Yufu / Yufuin-no-mori	refers to Yufu Onsen	JR Kyushu	Hakata – Yufuin, Ōita, Beppu (via Kyūdai Main Line)	1989–
μ Sky	-	Meitetsu	Shin-Unuma, Shin-Kani, Mikakino, Meitetsu Gifu, Meitetsu Nagoya – Central Japan International Airport	2005–

=== Express ===
Train name	Operator	Train endpoints	Operated
Chichibuji	Chichibu Railway	Hanyū, Kumagaya – Kagemori, Mitsumineguchi	1969–
Moriyoshi	Akita Nairiku Jūkan Railway	Kakunodate – Takanosu	1989–
SL Express	Ōigawa Railway	Shin-Kanaya – Senzu	1976–

=== Rapid ===
Train name	Operator	Train endpoints	Operated
Acty	JR East	Tokyo – Atami	1989–2023
Airport	JR Hokkaido	Otaru, Sapporo – New Chitose Airport	1992–
Aqua Liner	JR-West	Yonago – Masuda	2001–
Aterui	JR East	Mizusawa – Morioka	2001–
Central Liner	JR Central	Nagoya – Nakatsugawa	1999–2013
Hamayuri	JR East	Morioka – Kamaishi (via Kamaishi Line)	2002–
Kansai Airport Rapid Service	JR-West	Tennōji – Kansai Airport (via Ōsaka)	1994–
Karikachi	JR Hokkaido	Takikawa, Asahikawa – Obihiro	1990–2024
Kishuji Rapid Service	JR-West	Tennōji – Wakayama, Kainan, Gobō, Kii-Tanabe (via Ōsaka)	1999–
Kitami	JR Hokkaido	Asahikawa – Abashiri	1998–
Kubikino	JR East	Arai – Niigata	2002–2015
Marine Liner	JR-West / JR Shikoku	Okayama – Takamatsu	1988–
Mie	JR Central / Ise Tetsudo	Nagoya – Toba	1990–
Nayoro	JR Hokkaido	Asahikawa – Nayoro	1965–
Rabbit	JR East	Tokyo – Utsunomiya, Kuroiso	1988–
Rias	JR East	Morioka – Miyako (via Yamada Line)	1988–
Shōnan Liner	JR East	Tokyo – Odawara (Some of trains pass Tōkaidō Freight Line)	1986–2021
Sunliner	JR West	Okayama – Fukuyama	1989–2022
Sunport	JR Shikoku	Takamatsu – Matsuyama (some trains to Kotohira via the Dosan Line)	2002–
Tambaji Rapid Service	JR-West	Ōsaka – Sasayamaguchi	2000–
Tottori Liner	JR-West	Tottori – Yonago, Izumoshi	2001–
Urban	JR East	Tokyo – Takasaki, Maebashi	1989–2024
Yamatoji Rapid Service	JR-West	Tennōji – Kamo (via Ōsaka)	1989–

== Night trains ==
=== Limited express ===
Train name	Operator	Train endpoints	Operated
Akatsuki	JR-West	Kyoto – Nagasaki	1965 – Mar 2008
Akebono	JR East	Ueno – Aomori	1970 – Jan 2015
Asakaze	JR-West	Tokyo – Shimonoseki	1956 – Mar 2005
Cassiopeia	JR East	Ueno – Sapporo	1999 – Mar 2016; occasionally operates as a charter train
Dream Nichirin	JR Kyushu	Hakata – Minami-Miyazaki, Miyazaki Airport	1993–2011
Fuji	JR Kyushu	Tokyo – Ōita	1964 – Mar 2009
Hayabusa	JR Kyushu	Tokyo – Kumamoto	1958 – Mar 2009
Hokuriku	JR East	Ueno – Kanazawa	1947 – Mar 2010
Hokutosei	JR East / JR Hokkaido	Ueno – Sapporo	1988 – August 2015
Izumo	JR East	Tokyo – Izumoshi (via Tottori)	1972 – Mar 2006
Marimo	JR Hokkaido	Sapporo – Kushiro	2001–2008
Naha	JR Kyushu	Kyoto – Kumamoto	1968 – Mar 2008
Nihonkai	JR-West / JR East	Ōsaka – Aomori	1968 – Mar 2012
Sunrise Izumo	JR Central / JR-West	Tokyo – Izumoshi (via Okayama)	1998–
Sunrise Seto	JR Central / JR-West	Tokyo – Takamatsu (via Okayama)	1998–
Okhotsk	JR Hokkaido	Sapporo – Abashiri	1992 – Mar 2006; Daytime service continues
Rishiri	JR Hokkaido	Sapporo – Wakkanai	2000–2007
Sakura	JR Kyushu	Tokyo – Nagasaki	1959 – Mar 2005
Suisei	JR-West	Kyoto – Minami-Miyazaki	1968–2005
Twilight Express	JR-West	Ōsaka – Sapporo	1989 – Mar 2015
Oze yakō 23:55 / Snowpal 23:55	Tobu Railway	Asakusa – Aizukōgen-Ozeguchi	1986–; Climbing and skiing season only

=== Express ===
Train name	Operator	Train endpoints	Operated
Daisen	JR-West	Ōsaka – Yonago (via San'in Main Line)	1968 – Oct 2004
Ginga	JR-West	Tokyo – Ōsaka	1950 – Mar 2008
Hakkōda	JR East	Ueno – Aomori(via Tohoku Main Line)	1961 – Dec 1993 (daily operation) / Aug 1998 (temporary service)
Hamanasu	JR Hokkaido	Aomori – Sapporo	1955 – Mar 2016
Kitaguni	JR-West	Ōsaka – Niigata	1968 – Jan 2013
Noto	JR East	Ueno – Kanazawa	1975 – Feb 2012
Tsugaru	JR East	Ueno – Aomori(via Ōu Main Line)	1954 (temporary service) / 1956 – Dec 1993 (daily operation) / Jan 1998 (temporary service)

=== Rapid ===
Train name	Operator	Train endpoints	Operated
Moonlight Echigo	JR East	Shinjuku – Niigata	1986 – May 2014
Moonlight Nagara	JR East / JR Central	Tokyo – Ōgaki	1996 – March 2020
Moonlight Shinshu	JR East	Shinjuku - Hakuba	2002 - December 2018

== See also ==
- Rail transport in Japan
