= 683 series =

Japanese train type

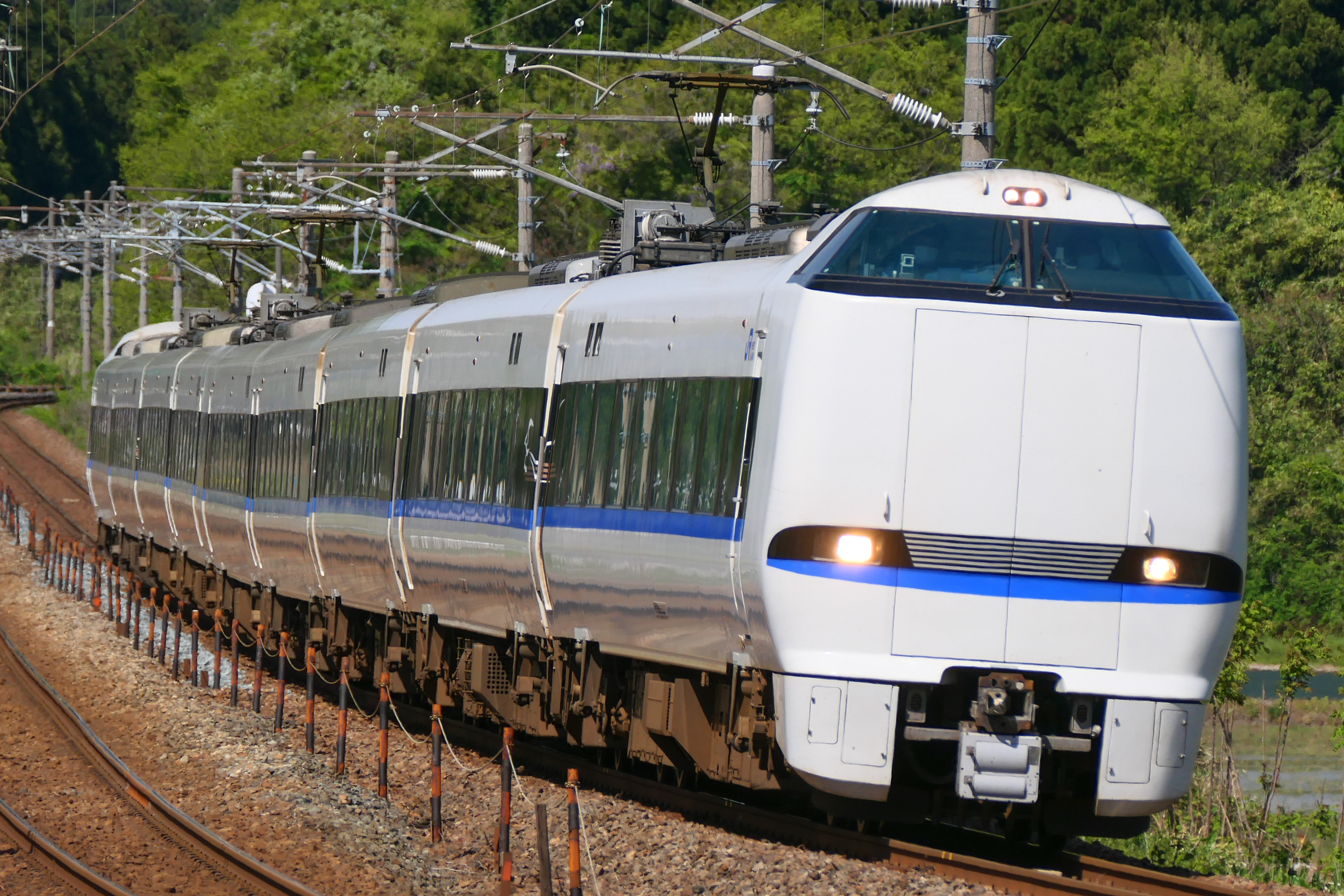
- A refurbished JR-West 683-4000 series train on a Thunderbird service in April 2022
- Manufacturers: Hitachi, Kawasaki Heavy Industries, Kinki Sharyo
- Family name: A-train
- Replaced: 485 series
- Constructed: 2001–2011
- Entered service: 2001
- Refurbished: 2015–
- Number built: 270 vehicles
- Number in service: 189 vehicles (the rest of 79 vehicles were converted to 289 series)
- Number scrapped: 2 vehicles
- Formation: 3/5/6/9 cars per trainset
- Operators: JR-West (2001–); Hokuetsu Express (2005–2015)
- Depots: Kyoto, Kanazawa
- Lines served: Tokaido Main Line, Kosei Line, Hokuriku Main Line, IR Ishikawa Railway Line, Nanao Line

Specifications
- Car body construction: Aluminium alloy, double-skin
- Maximum speed: 160 km/h (100 mph) (683-4000/5000/8000 series); 130 km/h (80 mph) (683-0/1000/2000/3000 series)
- Traction system: Variable frequency (3-level IGBT)
- Electric system: 20 kV AC 60 Hz / 1,500 V DC overhead
- Current collection: WPS27C scissors-type pantograph WPS28D single-arm pantograph (683-4000/5000 series)
- Braking systems: Regenerative brake, electronically controlled pneumatic brakes, snow-resistant brake
- Safety systems: ATS-SW, ATS-P
- Multiple working: 681 series
- Track gauge: 1,067 mm (3 ft 6 in)

The 683 series (683系, 683-kei) is a dual-voltage electric multiple unit (EMU) train type operated by West Japan Railway Company (JR-West) on limited express services in Japan since 2001.

== Variants ==
=== 683-0 series ===
The first subseries consists of 54 cars composed of 6 6-car trains (W31–W36) and 6 3-car trains (V31–V36) built in 2001–2002.

=== 683-2000 series ===
87 cars were built in 3-car and 5-car sets. This subseries was subsequently transferred to the 289 series with their AC equipment removed. The move was made after the opening of the Hokuriku Shinkansen and the associated discontinuation of service by these sets on the Hokuhoku Line.

=== 683-4000 series ===
108 cars were built in 9-car sets for a total of 12 trainsets.

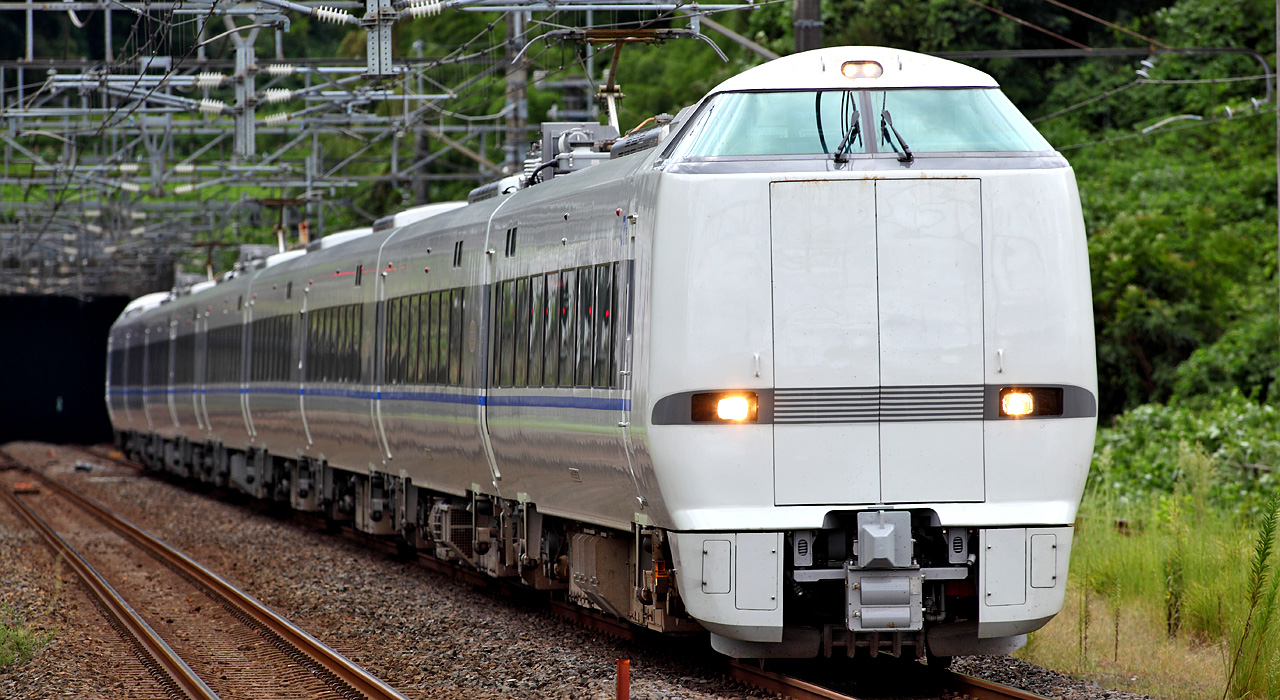
683-4000 series

=== 683-8000 series ===
This is the designation given to a 6-car train (N03) and a 3-car train (N13) formerly owned by Hokuetsu Express for services on the Hakutaka limited express. When the extension of the Hokuriku Shinkansen to Kanazawa opened in March 2015, the sets were transferred to JR West.

== Operations ==
=== JR-West ===
- Thunderbird
- Shirasagi
- Biwako Express
- Ohayō Express
- Oyasumi Express
- Dinostar (from 14 March 2015 until 15 March 2024)
- Noto Kagaribi (from 14 March 2015)
- Kuroshio (from 13 March 2015)

=== Hokuetsu Express ===
- Hakutaka (until 12 March 2015)

=== JR Central ===
- Home Liner Ōgaki rapid service (until 13 March 2015)
- Home Liner Sekigahara rapid service (until 13 March 2015)

== Formations ==
The various formations are configured as follows.

=== 3-car sets ===
==== Thunderbird sets ====
Designation	Tpc	M	T'c
Numbering	KuHa 682-500	MoHa 683-1300	KuHa 683–700

Designation	Tpc	T	Mc
Numbering	KuHa 682-2700	SaHa 683-2400	KuMoHa 683–3500

Designation	T'c	M	Tpc
Numbering	KuHa 683-8700	MoHa 683-8000	KuHa 682–8500

==== Shirasagi sets ====
Designation	Mc	T	Tpc
Numbering	KuMoHa 683-3500	SaHa 683-2400	KuHa 682–2700

The KuHa 682 cars are each fitted with one scissors-type pantograph.

=== 5-car sets ===
==== Shirasagi sets ====
Designation	Mc	T	Tp	M	Tpsc
Numbering	KuMoHa 683-3500	SaHa 683-2500	SaHa 682-2200	MoHa 683-3400	KuRo 682–2000

The SaHa 682 and KuRo 682 cars are each fitted with one scissors-type pantograph.

=== 6-car sets ===
==== Thunderbird sets ====
Designation	Tsc	Tp	M	T	Tp	Mc
Numbering	KuRo 683	SaHa 682	MoHa 683-1000	SaHa 683-300	SaHa 682	KuMoHa 683–1500

Designation	Mc	Tp	T	M	Tp	Tsc
Numbering	KuMoHa 683-8700	SaHa 682-8000	SaHa 683-8000	MoHa 683-8300	SaHa 682-8000	KuRo 683–8000

The SaHa 682 cars are each fitted with one scissors-type pantograph.

=== 9-car sets ===
==== Thunderbird sets ====
Designation	Tsc	Tp	M	Tp	M	T		Tp	Mc
Numbering	KuRo 683-4500	SaHa 682-4300	MoHa 683-5400	SaHa 682-4400	MoHa 683-5000	SaHa 683-4700	SaHa 683-4800	SaHa 682-4300	KuMoHa 683–5500

The SaHa 682 cars are each fitted with one single-arm pantograph.

== Interior ==
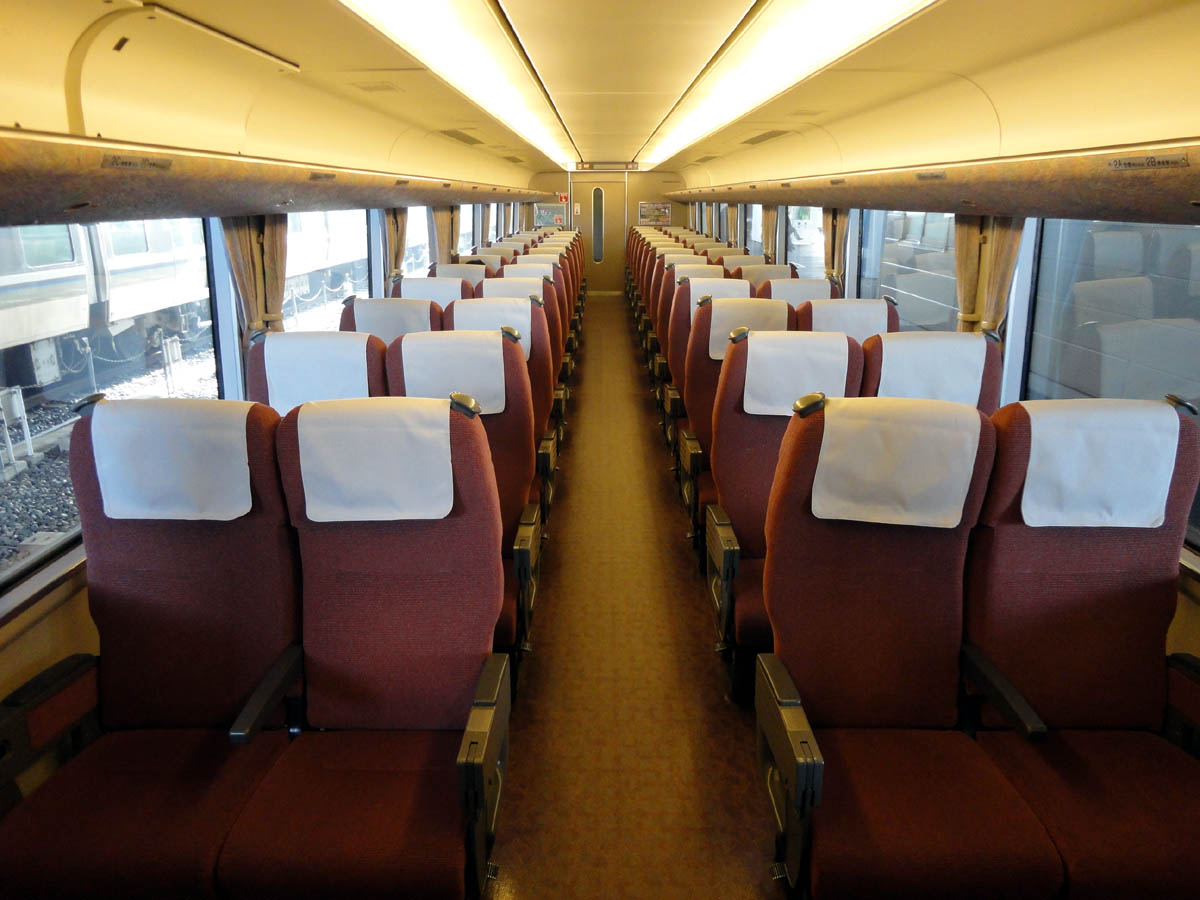
683-2000 series odd number car Standard-class saloon, January 2012

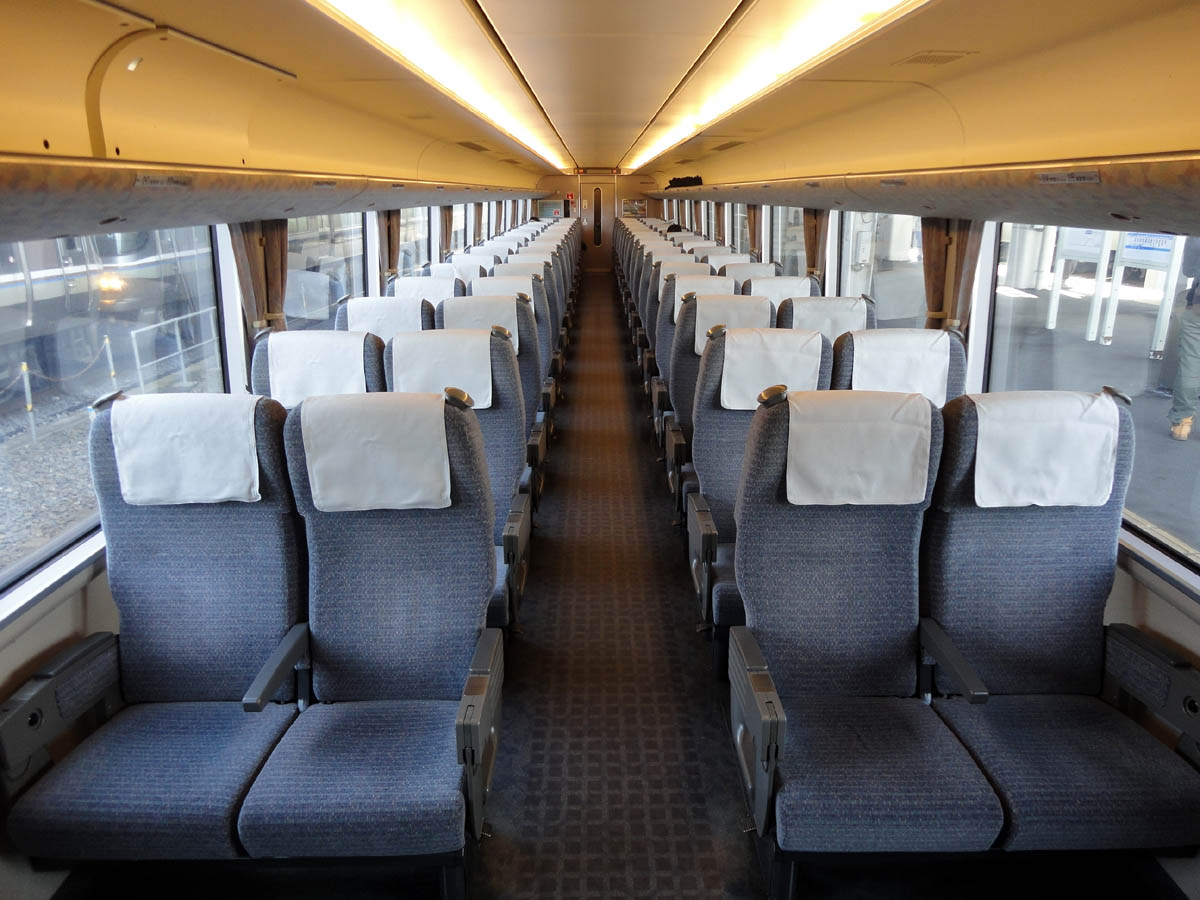
683-2000 series even number car Standard-class saloon, January 2012

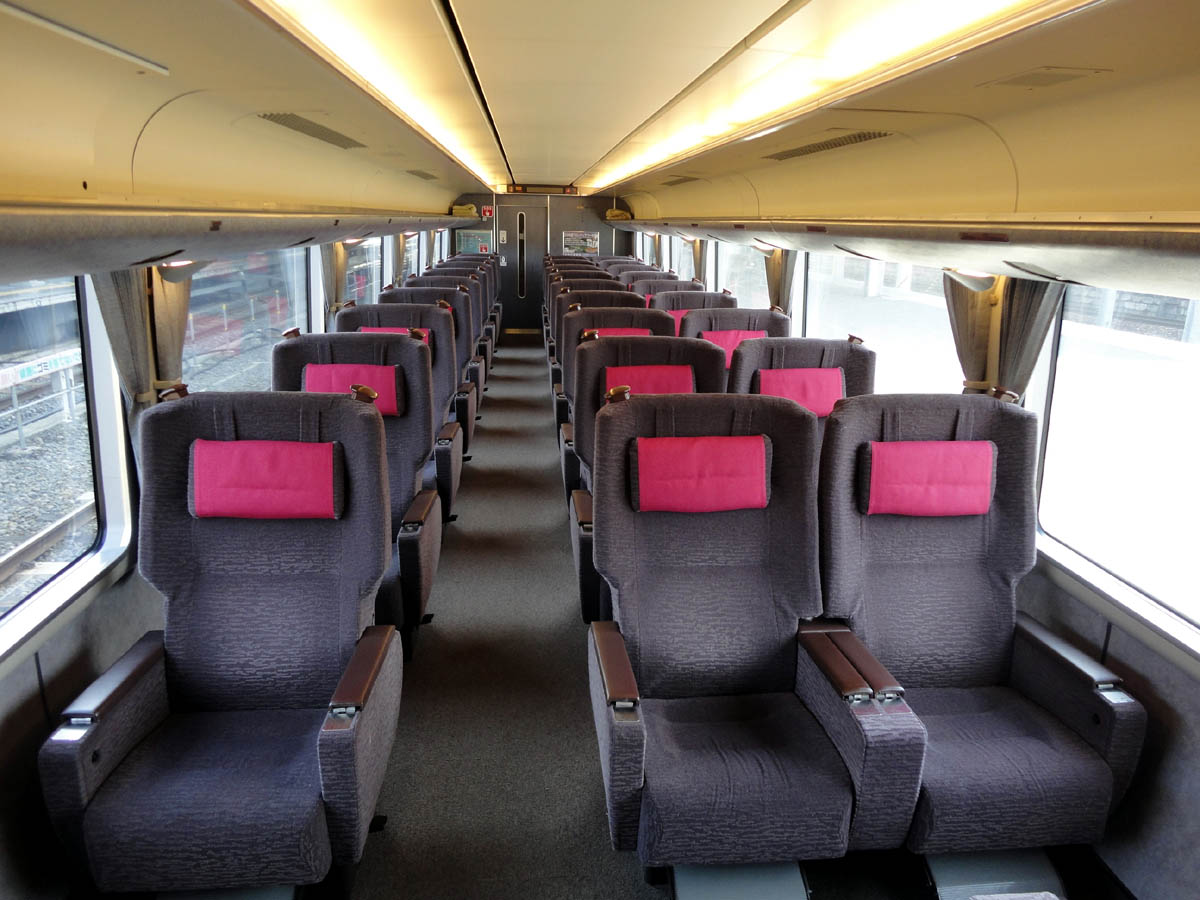
683-2000 series Green car saloon, January 2012

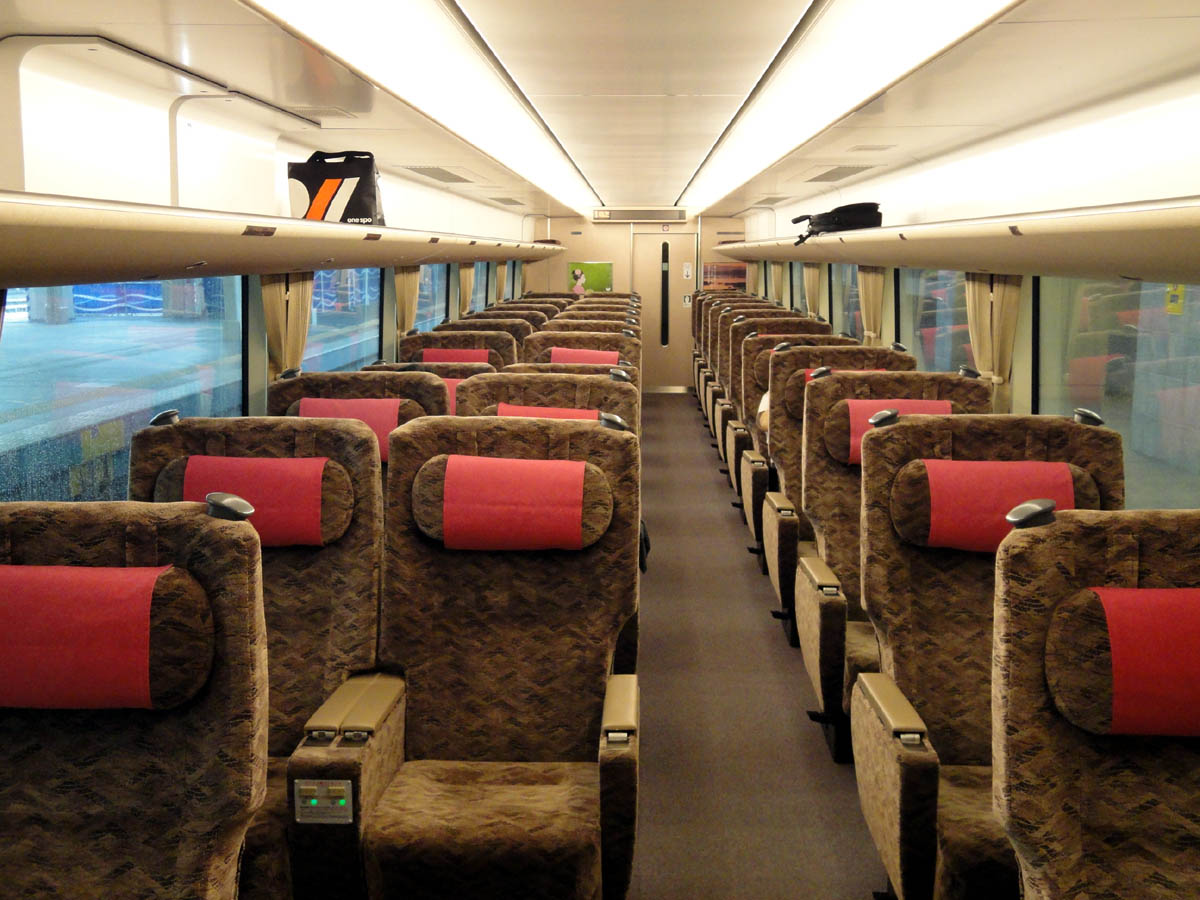
683-4000 series Green car saloon, June 2010

== Refurbishment ==
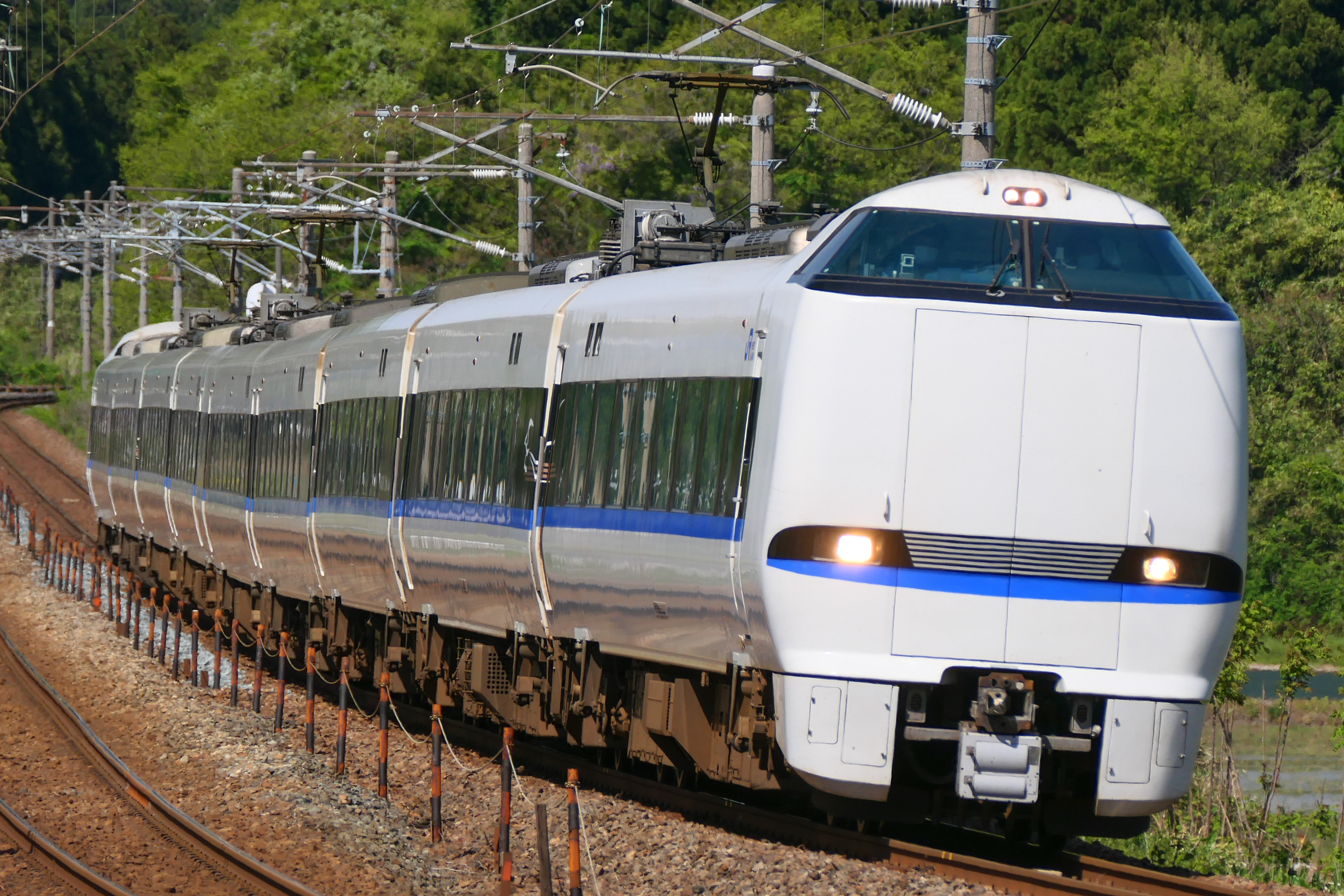
A refurbished 683–4000 series set in April 2022

All of the 683 series trainsets used on Thunderbird limited express services are scheduled to undergo a programme of refurbishment from the middle of 2015 until the end of fiscal 2018. The first set treated, nine-car 683–4000 series set T51, was returned to revenue service in September 2015.

== Conversion to 289 series ==
From 2015, 85 former Shirasagi 683 series vehicles were converted and reformed to become DC-only 289 series EMUs, formed as three-car, four-car, and six-car sets for use on Hashidate, Kinosaki, Kounotori, and Kurioshio limited express services in the Kyoto and Osaka area.
