= Hakutaka =

Japanese high-speed Shinkansen train service

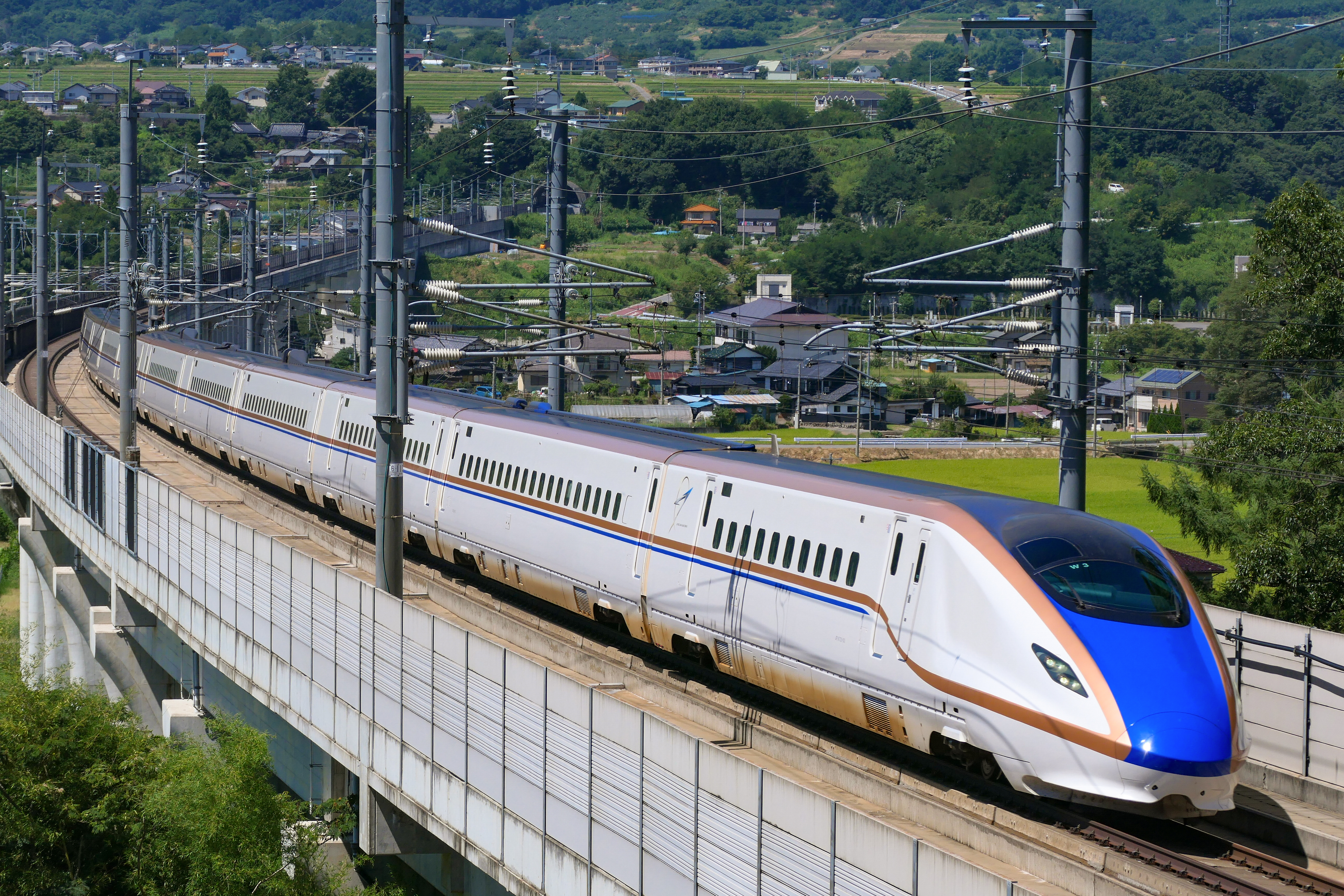
- W7 series set operating a Hakutaka service near Sakudaira Station, August 2020

Overview
- Service type: Shinkansen (Limited-stop)
- Status: Operational
- Locale: Hokuriku region, Japan
- First service: Limited express: 1 October 1965; Shinkansen: 14 March 2015
- Current operators: JR East; JR West
- Former operators: Japanese National Railways, Hokuetsu Express

Route
- Termini: Tokyo; Tsuruga
- Distance travelled: 579.2 km (359.9 mi)
- Service frequency: 15 round trips daily
- Train number: 551–591
- Line used: Hokuriku Shinkansen

On-board services
- Classes: Ordinary, Green, Gran Class
- Disabled access: Yes, cars 7 and 11
- Seating arrangements: 2+3 (Ordinary car); 2+2 (Green car); 1+2 (Gran Class)

Technical
- Rolling stock: E7 and W7 series
- Track gauge: 1,435 mm (4 ft 8 1/2 in) standard gauge
- Electrification: Overhead line: 25 kV 50 Hz AC; 25 kV 60 Hz AC
- Operating speed: 275 km/h (171 mph)

The Hakutaka (Japanese: はくたか; lit. 'white hawk') is a limited-stop high-speed Shinkansen service on the Hokuriku Shinkansen jointly operated by the East Japan Railway Company (JR East) and the West Japan Railway Company (JR West). It operates between Tokyo and Tsuruga in Japan. The Shinkansen service was introduced on 14 March 2015, although the name Hakutaka was previously used for a limited express service operated by Japanese National Railways (JNR) from 1965 to 1982, and later by JR West and Hokuetsu Express between 1997 and March 2015.

== Service outline ==
The operational schedule for the Hakutaka service currently features 15 continuous regular round trips, numbered 551 to 591, between Tokyo and Tsuruga, as well as between Tokyo and Kanazawa, with more trains terminating at Kanazawa.

Trains operate at a maximum speed of 260 km/h (160 mph).

Hakutaka services stop at the following stations. Not all trains stop at stations marked with an asterisk.

- Tokyo
- Ueno
- Ōmiya
- Takasaki
- Karuizawa*
- Sakudaira*
- Ueda*
- Nagano
- Iiyama*
- Jōetsumyōkō
- Itoigawa
- Kurobe-Unazukionsen
- Toyama
- Shin-Takaoka
- Kanazawa
- Komatsu
- Kagaonsen
- Awaraonsen
- Fukui
- Echizen-Takefu
- Tsuruga

== Rolling stock ==
- E7 series 12-car sets based at Nagano Depot, since 14 March 2015
- W7 series 12-car sets based at Hakusan Depot, since 14 March 2015

Hakutaka services are operated using JR East E7 series and JR West W7 series 12-car train sets based at Nagano and Hakusan depots respectively.

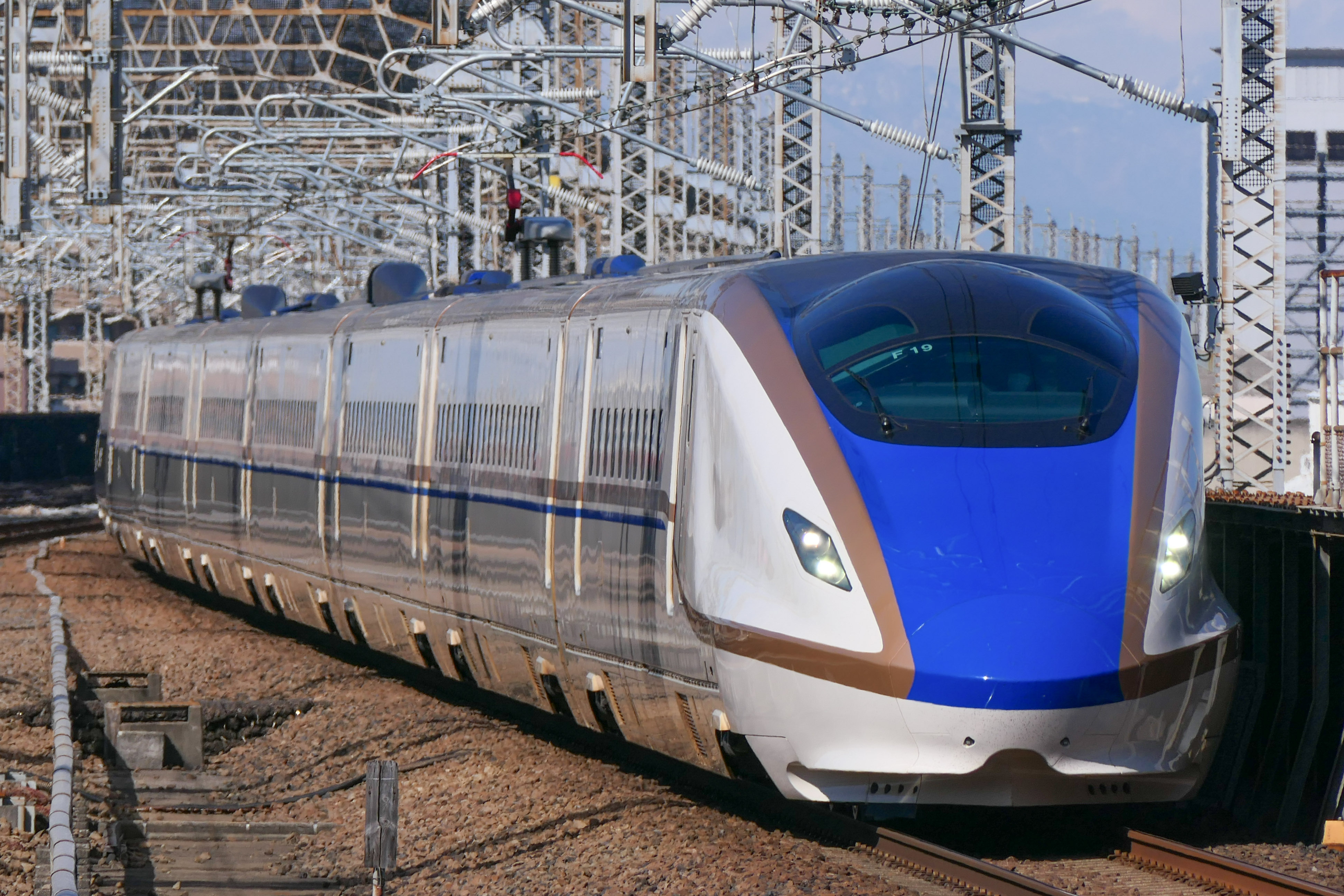
A JR East E7 series train

=== Pre-shinkansen ===
- 485 series EMUs
- 681 series EMUs owned by JR West
- 681-2000 series EMUs owned by Hokuetsu Express
- 683-8000 series EMUs owned by Hokuetsu Express

Limited express services from March 1997 until March 2015 were operated with 6- or 9-car (6+3-car) 681 series or 683-8000 series EMU trains owned by JR West or Hokuetsu Express. Green (first class) car accommodation was provided in car 1.

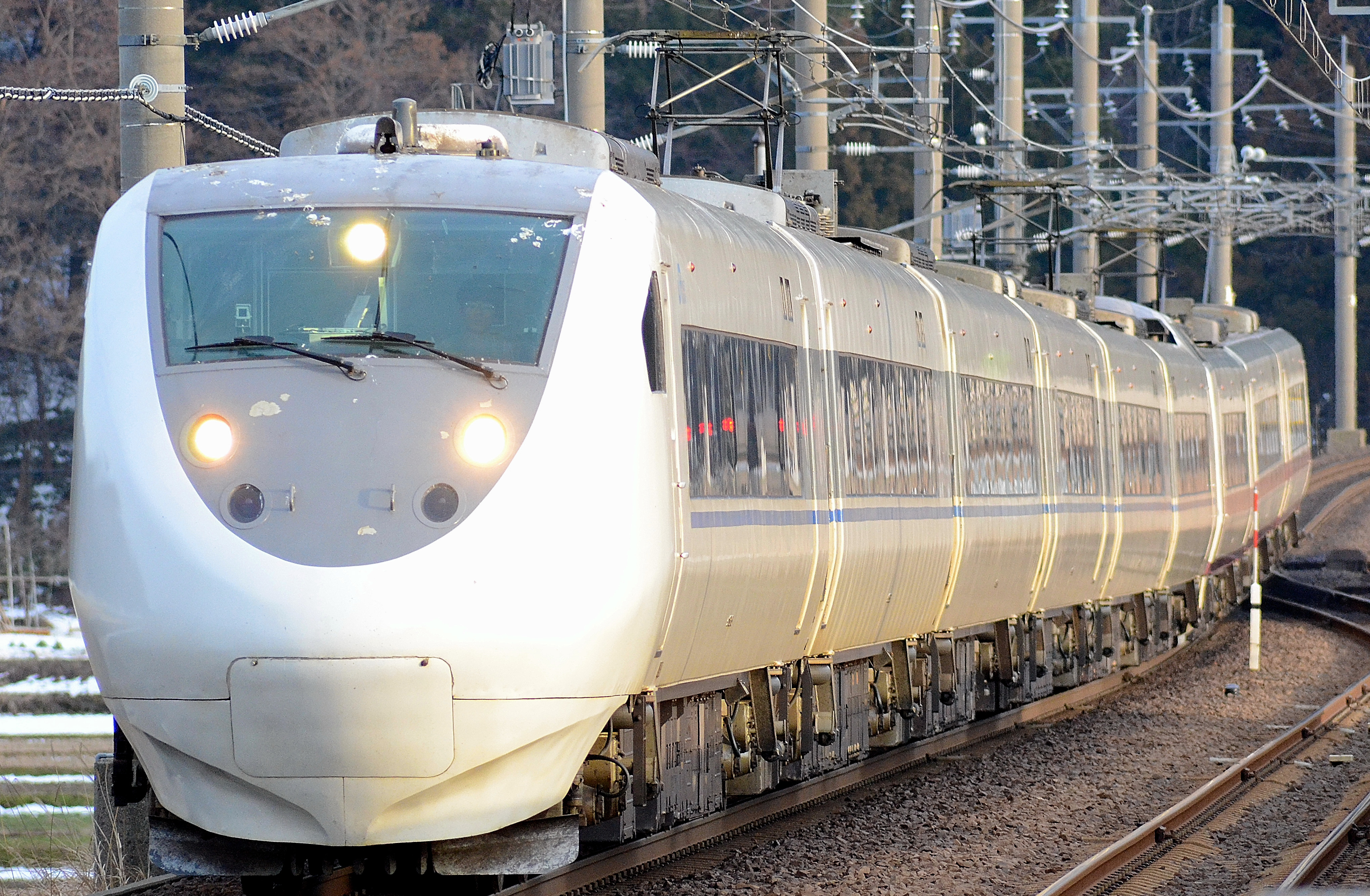
A JR West 681 series, February 2015

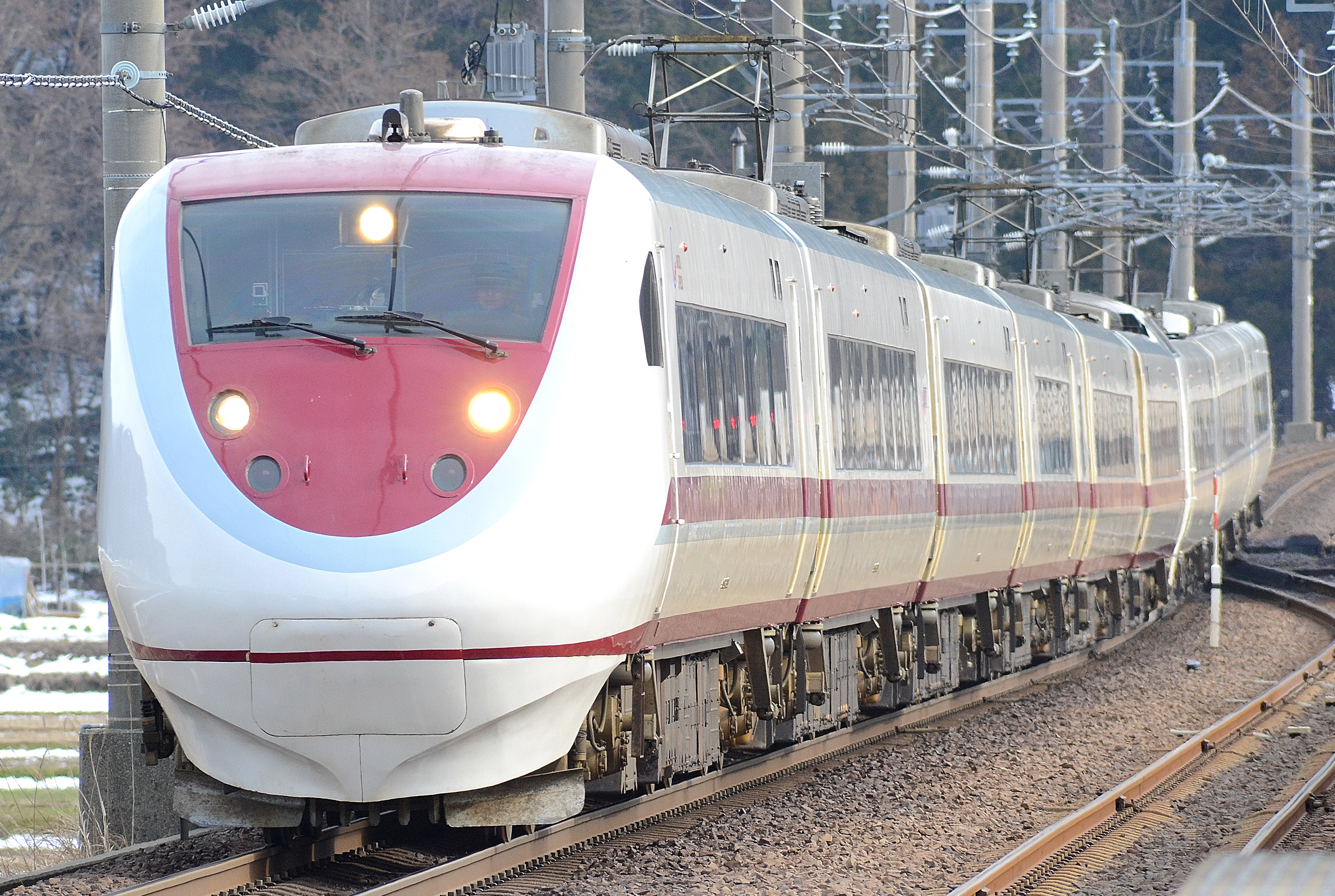
A Hokuetsu Express 681-2000 series, September 2014

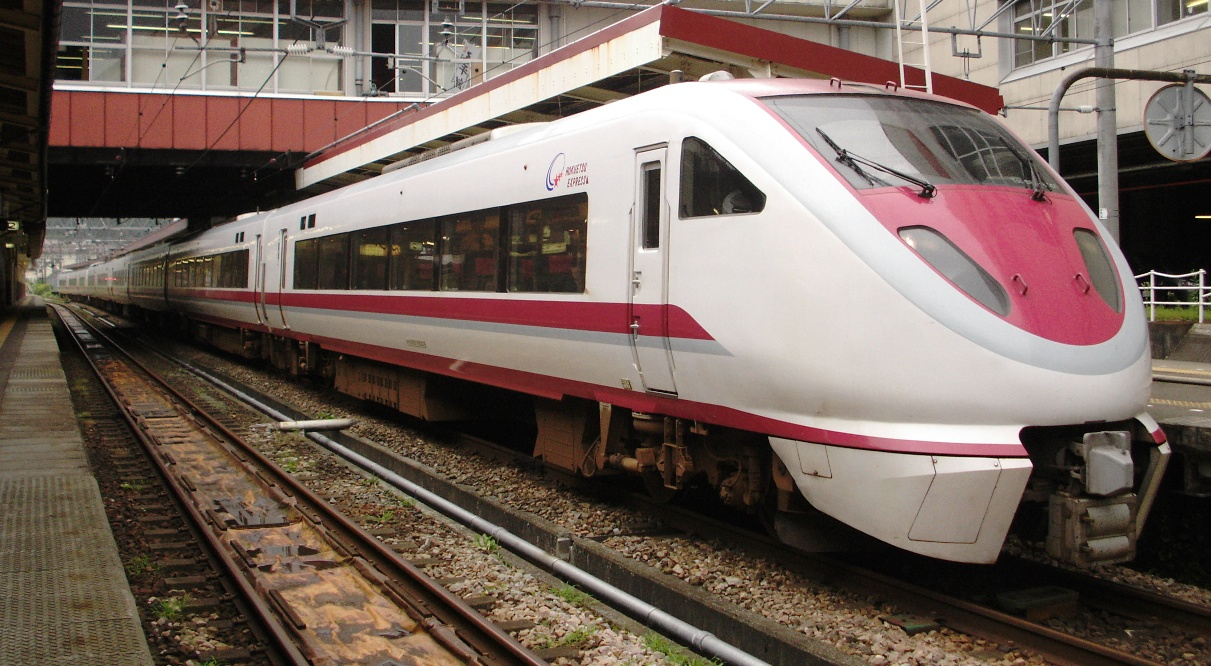
A Hokuetsu Express 683-8000 series, July 2007

== Formations ==
Hakutaka shinkansen services use 12-car JR East E7 series and JR West W7 series trainsets, formed as follows, with car 1 at the Tokyo (southern) end. Cars 1 to 10 are ordinary-class cars with 2+3 seating, car 11 is a "Green" car with 2+2 seating, and car 12 is a "Gran Class" car with 2+1 seating. All cars are no-smoking.

Car No.	1	2	3	4	5	6	7	8	9	10	11	12
Accommodation	Non-reserved	Non-reserved	Non-reserved	Non-reserved	Reserved	Reserved	Reserved	Reserved	Reserved	Reserved	Green	Gran Class
Facilities	Toilets		Toilets, phone		Toilets		Wheelchair space, accessible toilet, phone		Toilets		Wheelchair space, accessible toilet	Toilets

== History ==
=== October 1965 – November 1982 ===
The Hakutaka service was first introduced on 1 October 1965 as a limited express service operating between Ueno in Tokyo and Kanazawa via Naoetsu. This was discontinued from 15 November 1982.

=== March 1997 – March 2015 ===
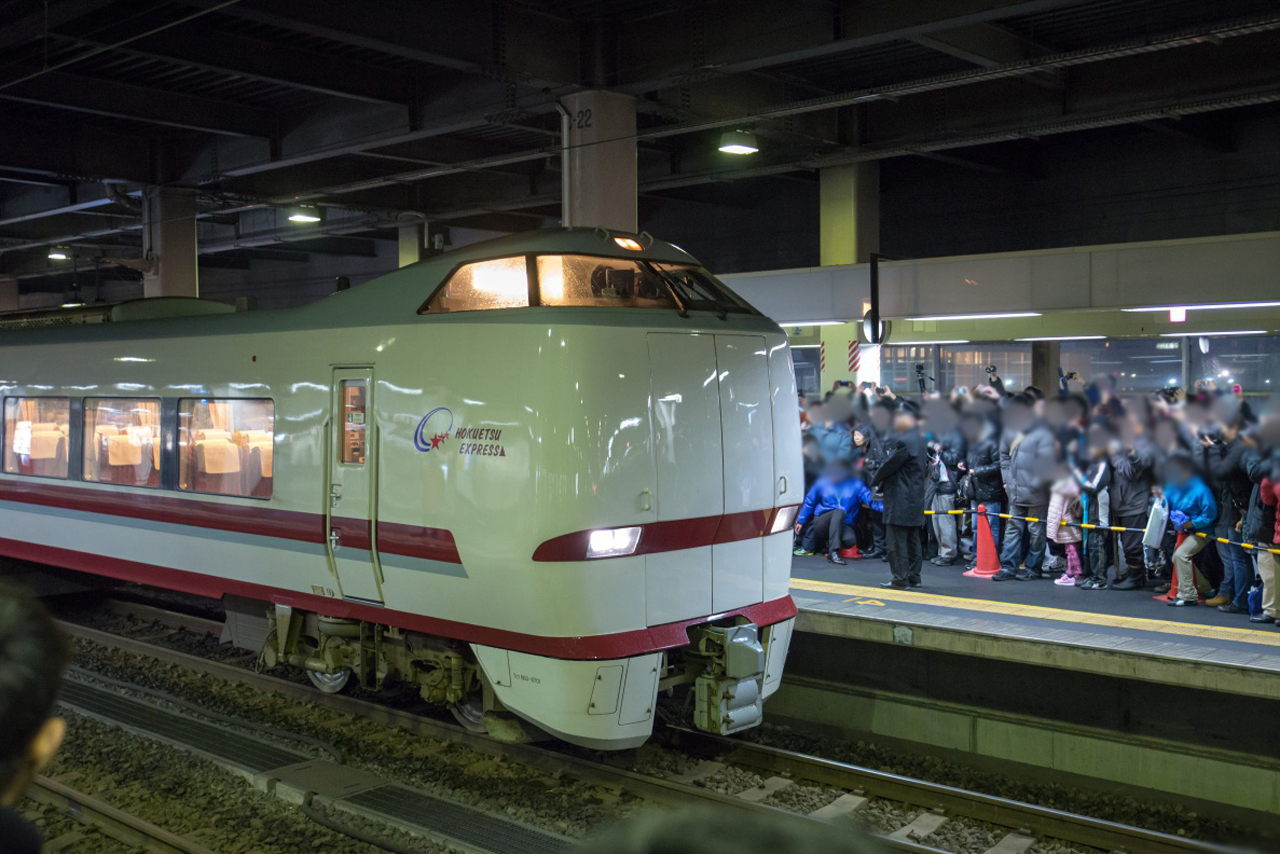
A Hokuetsu Express 683-8000 series EMU on the last run as limited express Hakutaka service from Kanazawa on 13 March 2015

The Hakutaka name was reinstated from 23 March 1997 for use on new limited express services jointly operated by JR West and Hokuetsu Express connecting Kanazawa with Echigo-Yuzawa on the Joetsu Shinkansen via the newly built Hokuetsu Express Hokuhoku Line, operating at a maximum speed of 160 km/h (100 mph). Services travelling beyond Naoetsu required a switchback. Hakutaka services operated at approximately hourly intervals between Kanazawa and Echigo-Yuzawa, with one return service daily starting and terminating at Fukui. One return working daily operated between Wakura-Onsen and Echigo-Yuzawa. Services stopped at the following stations.

(Fukui) – Kanazawa – Takaoka – Toyama – Uozu – Itoigawa – Naoetsu – Echigo-Yuzawa

The last Hakutaka limited express service ran on 13 March 2015, replaced by new high-speed shinkansen services from the start of the revised timetable introduced the following day.

=== Shinkansen Hakutaka, (March 2015 – ) ===
From 14 March 2015, the name Hakutaka was transferred to new shinkansen services operating between Tokyo and Kanazawa following the opening of the Hokuriku Shinkansen beyond Nagano.

Since the extension of the Hokuriku Shinkansen to Tsuruga on 16 March 2024, Hakutaka service has been extended past Kanazawa and now reaches Tsuruga.

== See also ==
- List of named passenger trains of Japan
