= Shirasagi (train) =

Japanese train service

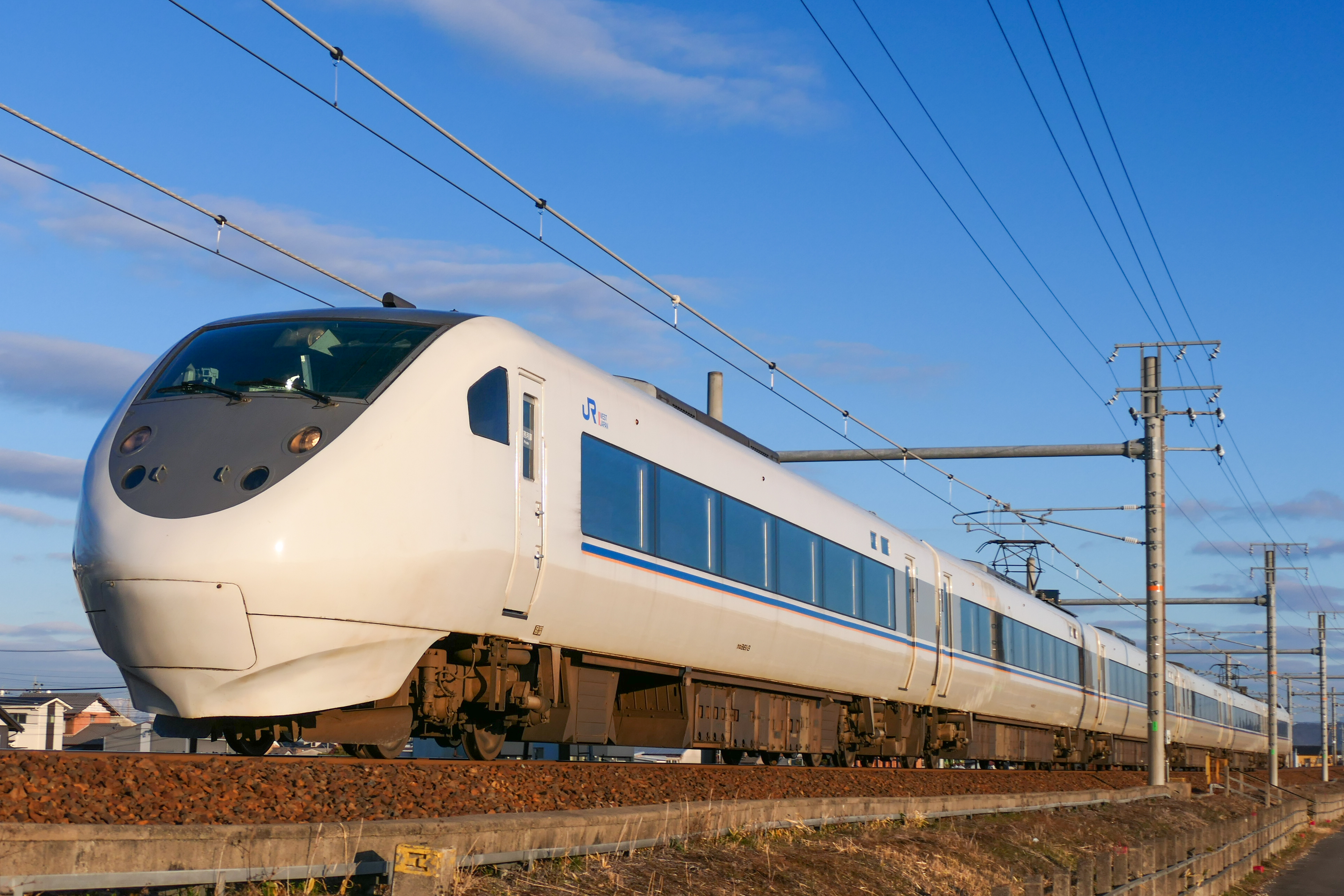

Overview
- Service type: Limited express
- First service: 25 December 1964
- Current operator(s): JR West
- Former operator(s): JNR

Route
- Termini: Nagoya
- Stops: Tsuruga
- Service frequency: 14 return services daily
- Line(s) used: Tōkaidō Main Line; Hokuriku Main Line

On-board services
- Class(es): Green, standard

Technical
- Rolling stock: 681 series EMUs; 683 series EMUs
- Track gauge: 1,067 mm (3 ft 6 in)
- Operating speed: 130 km/h (80 mph)

The Shirasagi (しらさぎ) is a limited express train service in Japan operated by the West Japan Railway Company (JR West) since 1964. It runs between Nagoya and Tsuruga. Shirasagi (白鷺) is the Japanese name for the "egret", a white heron.

For services continuing to and from Nagoya, a switchback is required at Maibara Station to enable services to continue travel in either direction. Half of all services operate between Maibara and Tsuruga.

== Rolling stock ==
Services are normally operated using Kanazawa-based 681 series and 683-8000 series EMUs formed as 6-, 6+3-, or 6+3+3-car formations. Services were originally formed of 7-car 485 series, 489 series and 5-, 5+3-, or 5+3+3-car 683 series EMUs.

== Formations ==
Services are formed as follows:

Car No.	1	2	3	4	5	6
Accommodation	Green	Reserved	Reserved	Reserved	Reserved	Reserved

Car No.	1	2	3	4	5	6	7	8	9
Accommodation	Green	Reserved	Reserved	Reserved	Reserved	Reserved	Reserved	Reserved	Reserved

== History ==
The Shirasagi service was first introduced on 25 December 1964. Services operated between Nagoya and Toyama.

From the start of the revised timetable on 14 March 2015, with the opening of the Hokuriku Shinkansen, all Shirasagi services were shortened for the first time to run between Nagoya and Kanazawa.

From the start of the revised timetable on 16 March 2024, all Shirasagi services were shortened for the second time to run between Nagoya and Tsuruga with the extension of the Hokuriku Shinkansen. Non-reserved seating was also discontinued on all Shirasagi services on this date.

== See also ==
- List of named passenger trains of Japan
