= Thunderbird (train) =

Japanese limited express train service

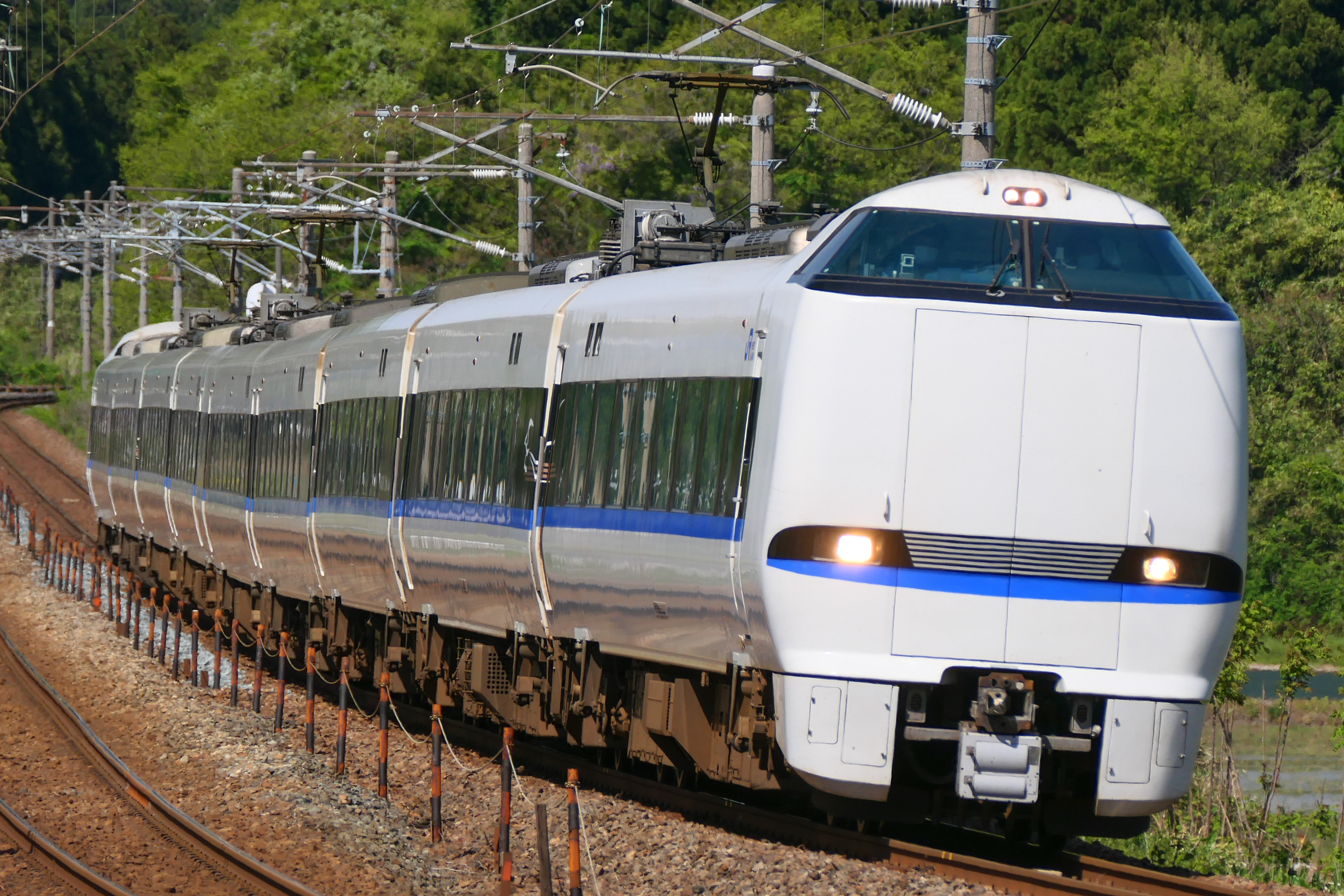
- A refurbished JR-West 683-4000 series train on a Thunderbird service in April 2022

Overview
- Service type: Limited express
- Status: Operational
- Locale: Japan
- First service: 1995
- Current operator: JR West

Route
- Lines used: Tokaido Line (JR Kyoto Line), Kosei Line

On-board services
- Other facilities: Universal Toilets

Technical
- Rolling stock: 681 series, 683 series
- Track gauge: 1,067 mm (3 ft 6 in)

The Thunderbird (サンダーバード, Sandābādo) is a limited express train service operated by the West Japan Railway Company (JR West) between Osaka and Tsuruga in Japan, using portions of the Tokaido Main Line and Kosei Line.

== Station stops ==
Stations in parentheses are not served by all services.

=== Thunderbird ===
Osaka – Tsuruga: Osaka - Shin-Osaka - (Takatsuki) - Kyoto - (Katata) - (Omi-Imazu) - Tsuruga

=== Business Thunderbird ===
(an extra train which runs from Osaka to Tsuruga in the morning on weekdays after holidays)

Osaka → Shin-Osaka → Kyoto → Tsuruga

== Rolling stock ==
JR West 683 series Thunderbird limited express at Shin-Hikida Station, Tsuruga

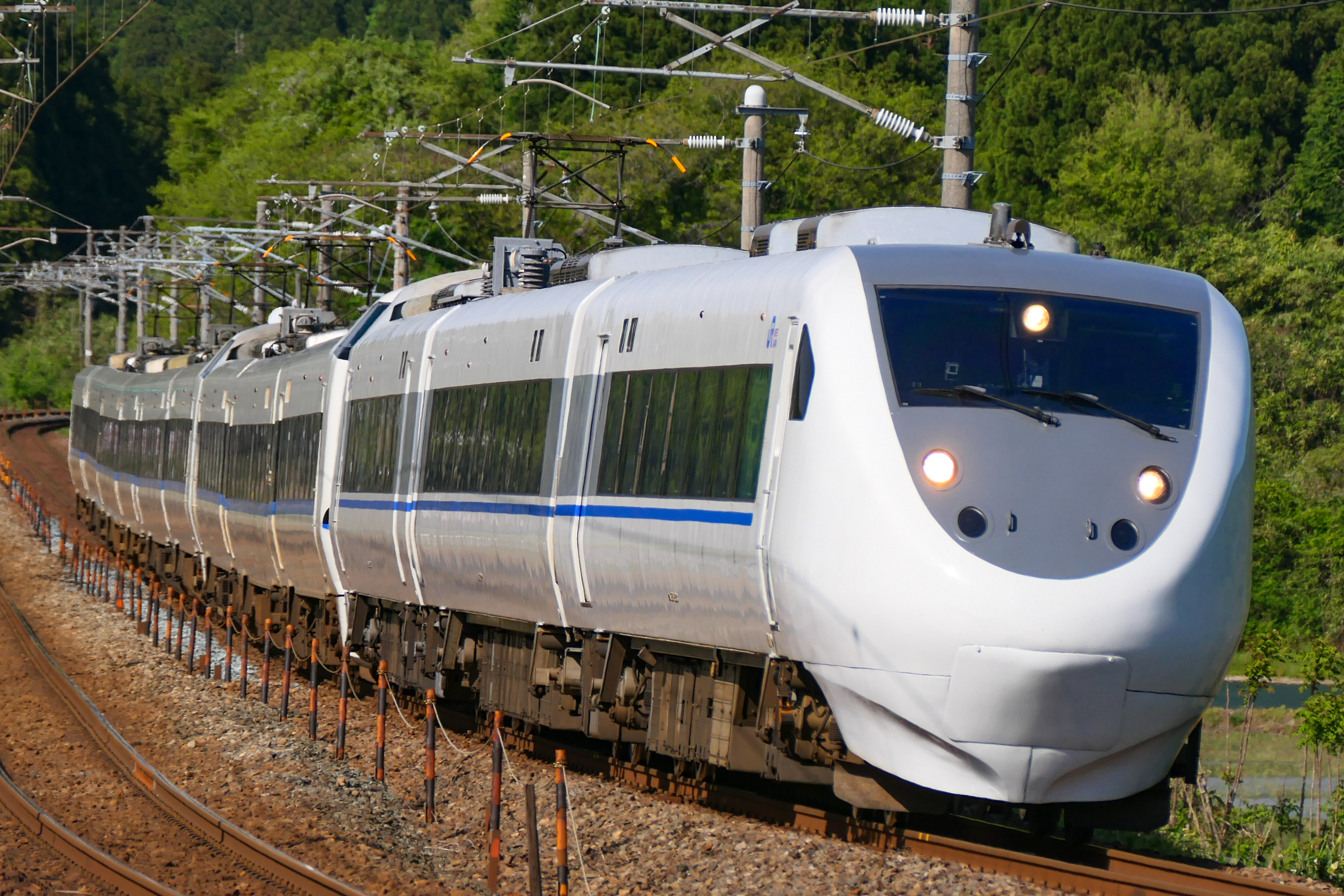
A JR-West 681 series train on a Thunderbird service in April 2022

- 681 series EMUs (since April 1995)
- 683 series EMUs (since March 2001)

== Formations ==
Services are formed as follows:

=== Thunderbird ===
Car No.	1	2	3	4	5	6	7	8	9
Accommodation	Green	Reserved	Reserved	Reserved	Reserved	Reserved	Reserved	Reserved	Reserved

Car No.	1	2	3	4	5	6	7	8	9	10	11	12
Accommodation	Green	Reserved	Reserved	Reserved	Reserved	Reserved	Reserved	Reserved	Reserved	Reserved	Reserved	Reserved

=== Business Thunderbird ===
Car No.	1	2	3
Accommodation	Reserved	Reserved	Reserved

== History ==
From the start of the 20 April 1995 timetable revision, new 681 series EMUs were introduced on Osaka to Toyama services, named Super Raichō (Thunderbird). These became simply Thunderbird from March 1997.

The last remaining Raichō service was discontinued from the start of the 12 March 2011 timetable revision, with all trains subsequently using the Thunderbird name.

From the start of the revised timetable on 14 March 2015, with the opening of the Hokuriku Shinkansen, all Thunderbird services were shortened for the first time to run between Osaka, Kanazawa and Wakura-Onsen.

From the start of the revised timetable on 16 March 2024, all Thunderbird services were shortened for the second time to run between Osaka and Tsuruga with the opening of the extension of the Hokuriku Shinkansen between Kanazawa and Tsuruga. With effect from the same date, all non-reserved seating was discontinued on all Thunderbird services.

== Incidents ==
On 3 August 2006, a woman was raped by a 36-year-old man in a train toilet while travelling on the Thunderbird 50 service (just after Fukui Station), despite the car being occupied by approximately 40 other passengers. As a result, JR West introduced a "women-only" section in the reserved-seating cars of Raichō and Thunderbird trains from October 2007, and JR East added prominent "SOS" stickers inside all of its trains in June 2007. On 17 January 2008, the district court in Otsu sentenced the man to 18 years in prison.

== Future developments ==
All of the 681 and 683 series trainsets used on Thunderbird limited express services are scheduled to undergo a programme of refurbishment from autumn 2015 until the end of fiscal 2018.

== See also ==
- Shirasagi: Limited-express service between Nagoya and the Hokuriku region, using identical rolling stock with slightly different livery
