= 681 series =

Japanese train type

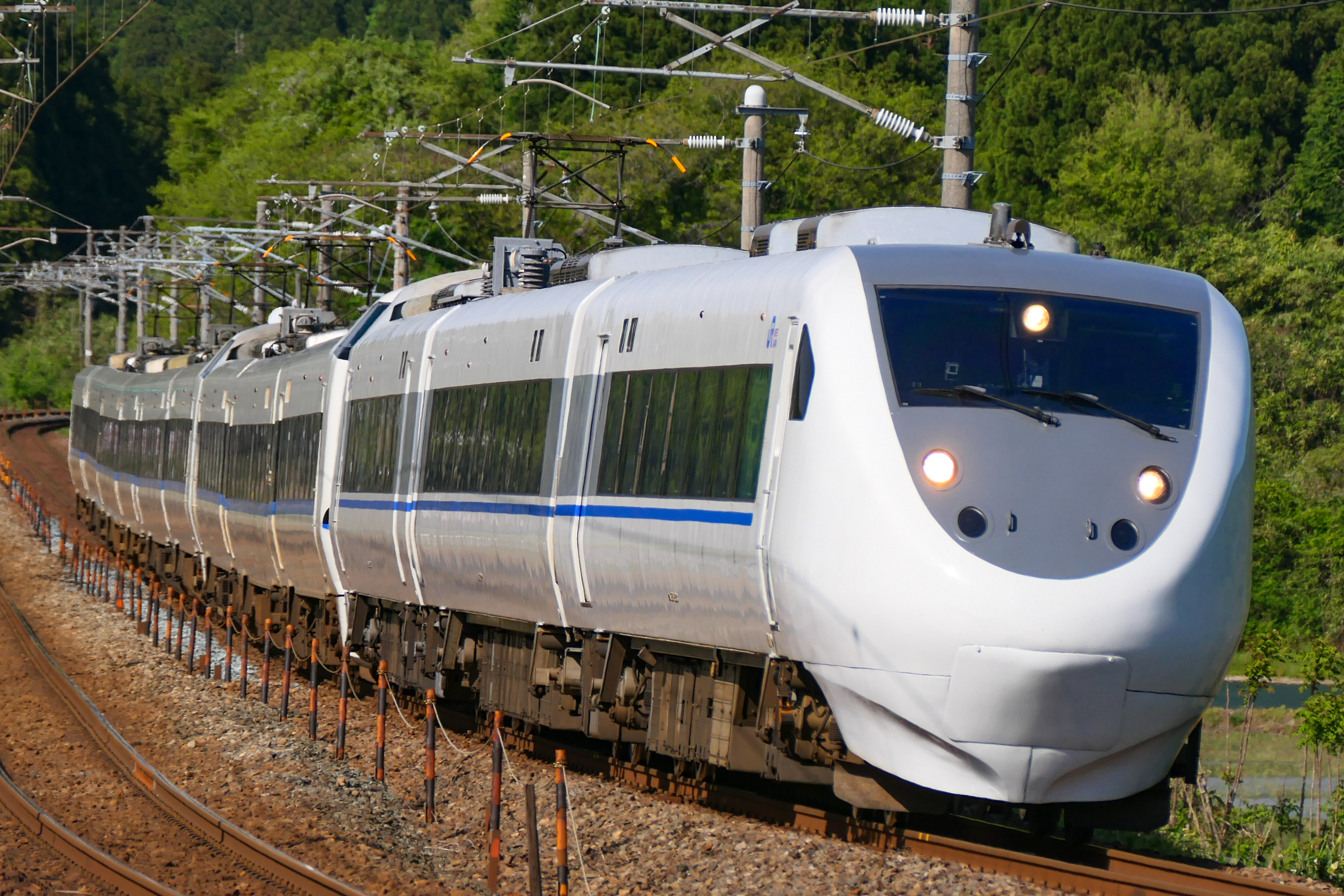
- A JR-West 681 series train on a Thunderbird service in April 2022
- Manufacturers: Niigata Transys, Kawasaki Heavy Industries, Kinki Sharyo, Hitachi
- Constructed: 1992 (Prototype set); 1995–1997
- Entered service: 1992
- Refurbished: 2015–2018
- Scrapped: 2015–
- Number built: 102 vehicles
- Number in service: 99 vehicles (as of 1 October 2015)
- Number scrapped: 3 vehicles
- Formation: 3/6 cars per trainset
- Operators: JR-West (1992–); Hokuetsu Express (1997–2015)
- Depots: Kyoto, Kanazawa
- Lines served: Tokaido Main Line, Kosei Line, Hokuriku Main Line, Nanao Line, Shinetsu Main Line, Joetsu Line, Hokuetsu Express Hokuhoku Line

Specifications
- Car body construction: Steel
- Maximum speed: 160 km/h (100 mph) (Hokuhoku Line); 130 km/h (80 mph) (JR lines)
- Traction system: Thyristor drive + Variable frequency (GTO)
- Acceleration: 1.8 km/h/s (1.2 mph/s)
- Deceleration: 5.5 km/h/s (3.4 mph/s)
- Electric system: 20 kV AC 60 Hz / 1,500 V DC overhead
- Current collection: WPS27C scissors-type pantograph
- Braking systems: Regenerative brake, electronically controlled pneumatic brakes, snow-resistant brake
- Safety systems: ATS-SW, ATS-P
- Multiple working: 683 series
- Track gauge: 1,067 mm (3 ft 6 in)

The 681 series (681系, 681-kei) is a dual-voltage electric multiple unit (EMU) train type operated by West Japan Railway Company (JR-West) on limited express services in Japan.

== Variants ==
=== 681-0 series ===
Four six-car sets (T01–T03, T06) and five three-car sets (T11–T13, T15, T17) are used on Thunderbird services. These trains feature Thunderbird branding. Also four six-car sets (W01–W04) and four three-car sets (W11–W14) were used on Hakutaka services. These trains featured "White Wing" logos.

From February 2015, Hakutaka W sets began being repainted into the same livery as 683 series trainsets used on Shirasagi services, with thin blue and orange lines below the window band.

=== 681-1000 series ===
The pre-series six-car set (T18) and one three-car set (T07) are used on Thunderbird services.

=== 681-2000 series ===
Two six-car sets (N01–N02) and two three-car sets (N11–N12) were formerly used on Hokuetsu Express Hakutaka services. These trains featured "Snow Rabbit Express" logos.

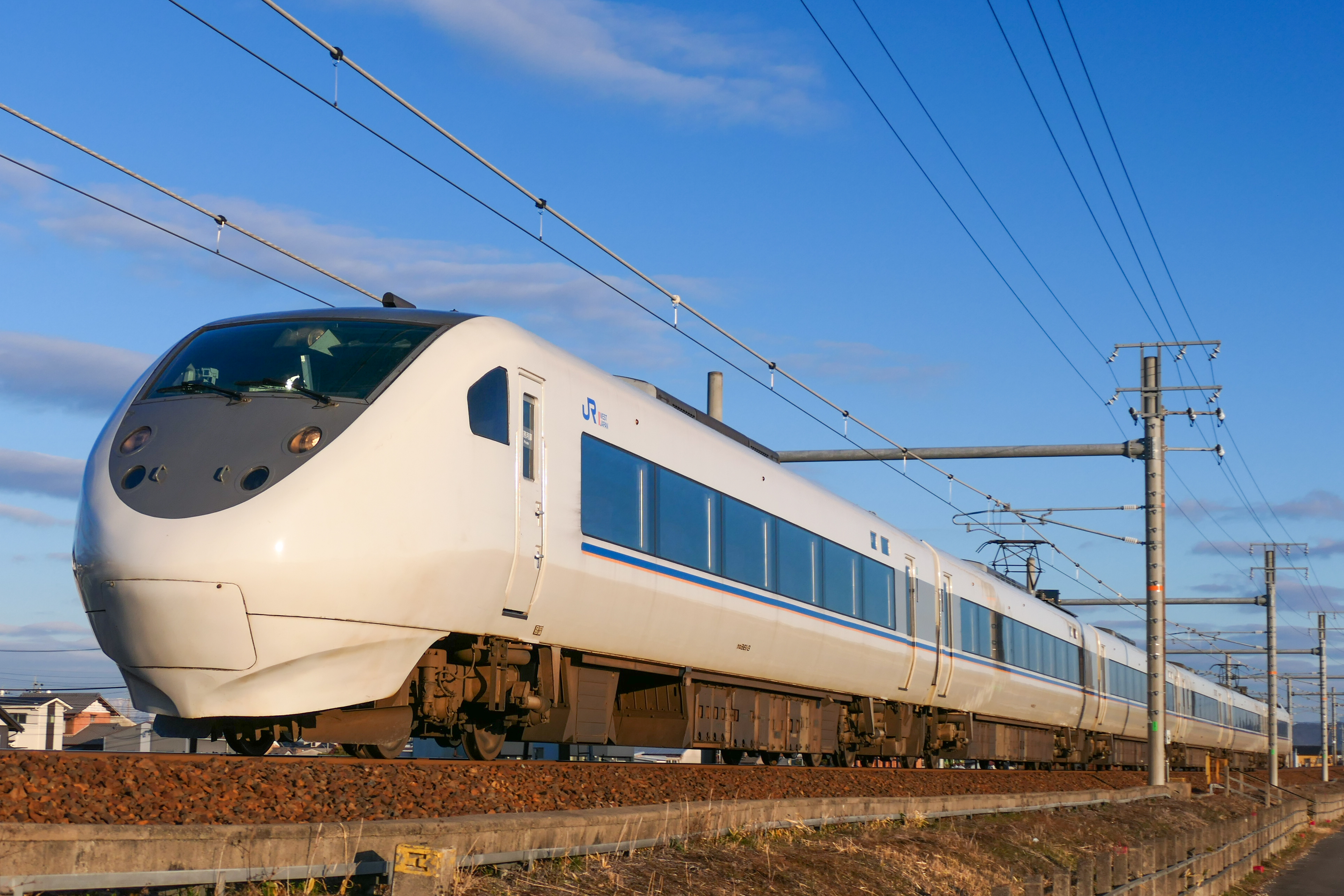
JR-West Shirasagi livery (681-0 series)

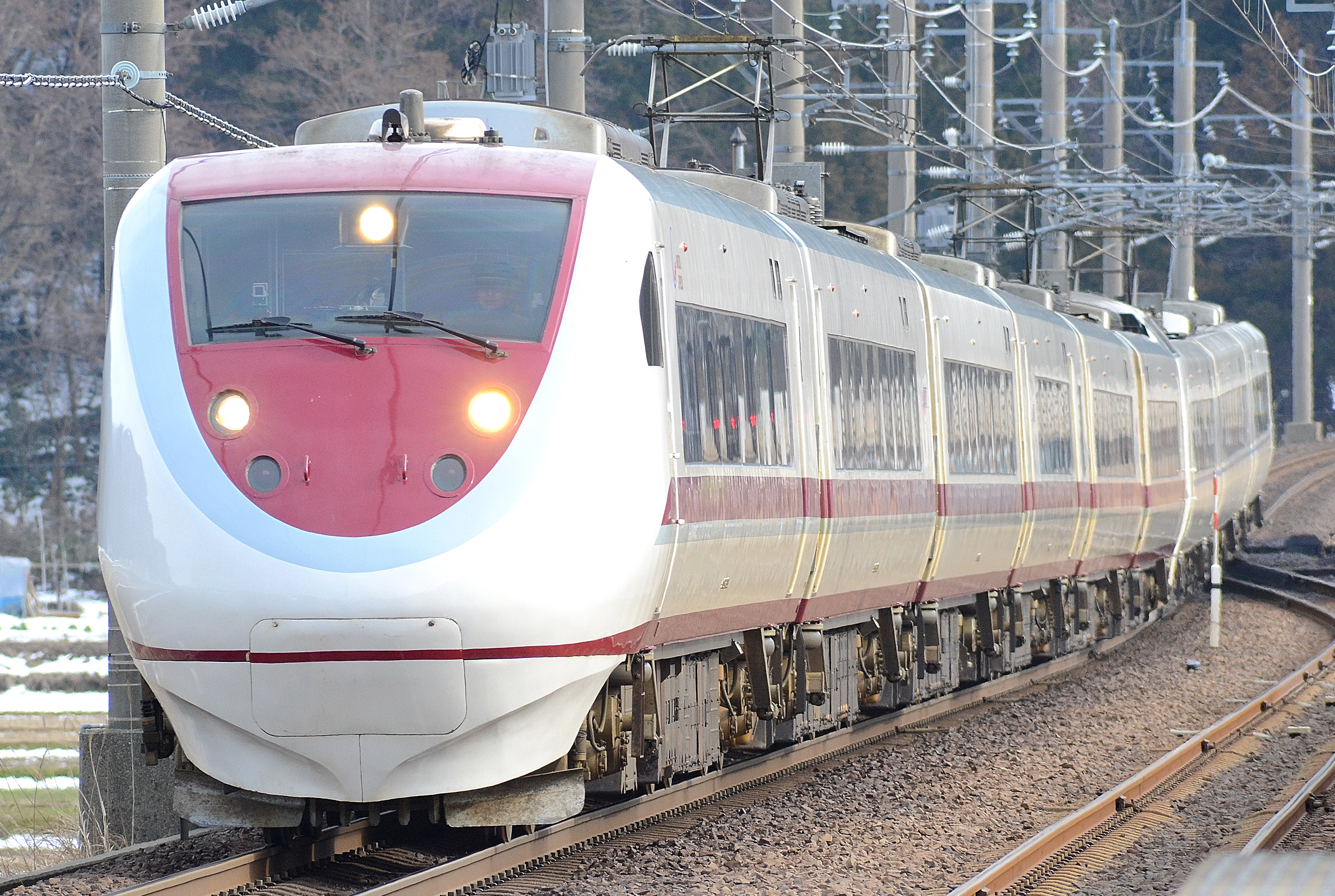
Hokuetsu Express livery (681-2000 series)

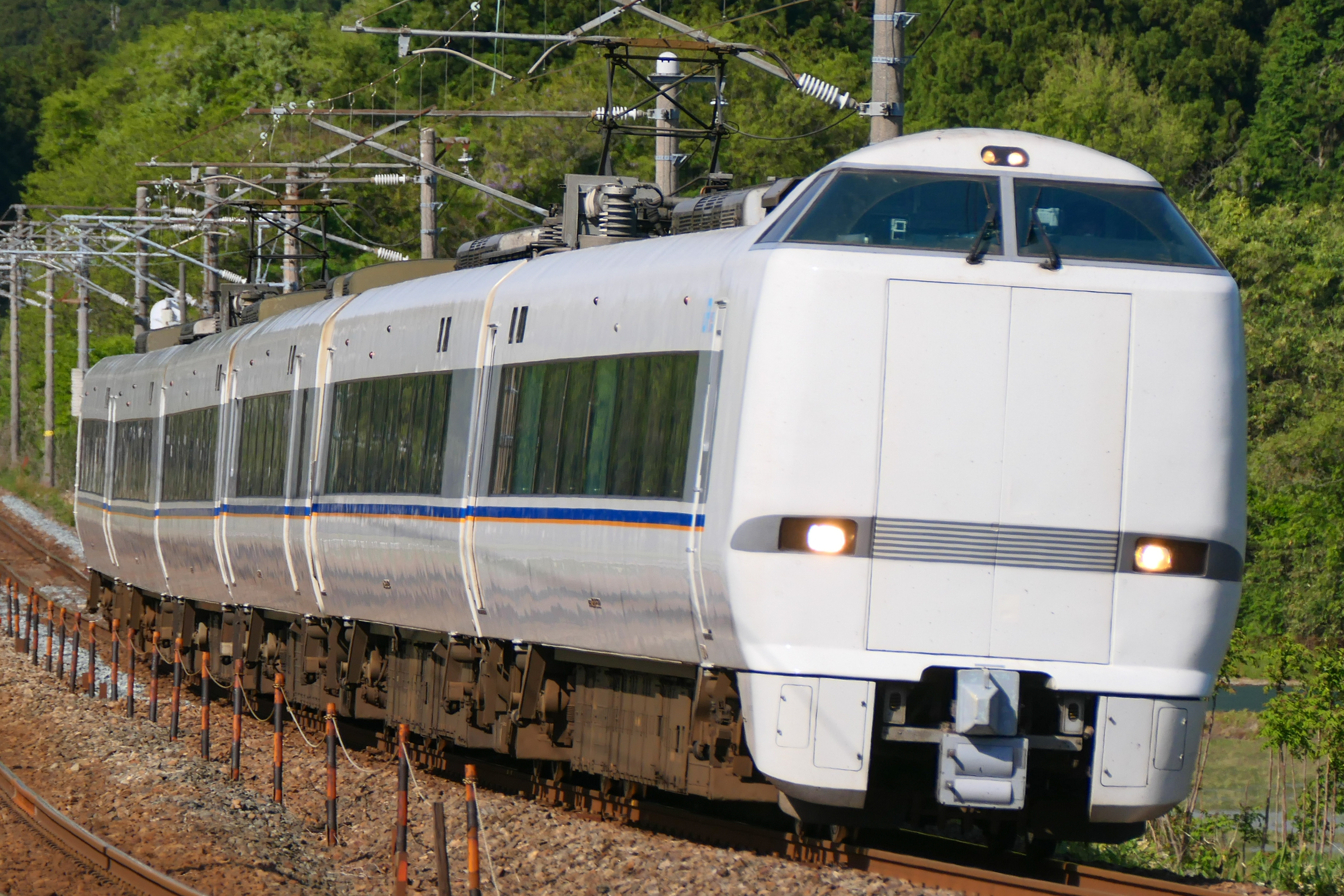
Gangwayed cab car

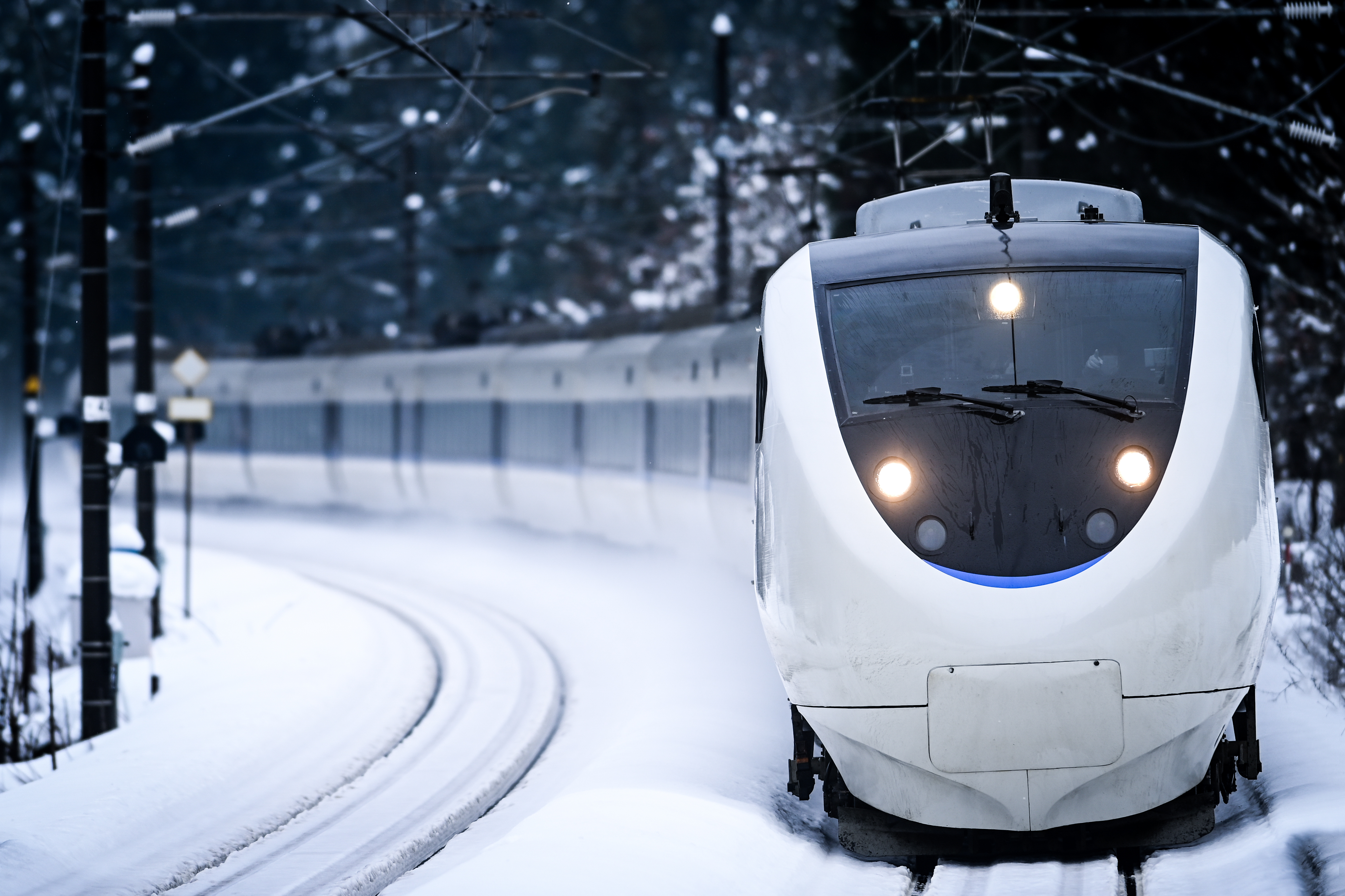
A refurbished 681-0 series set

== Interior ==
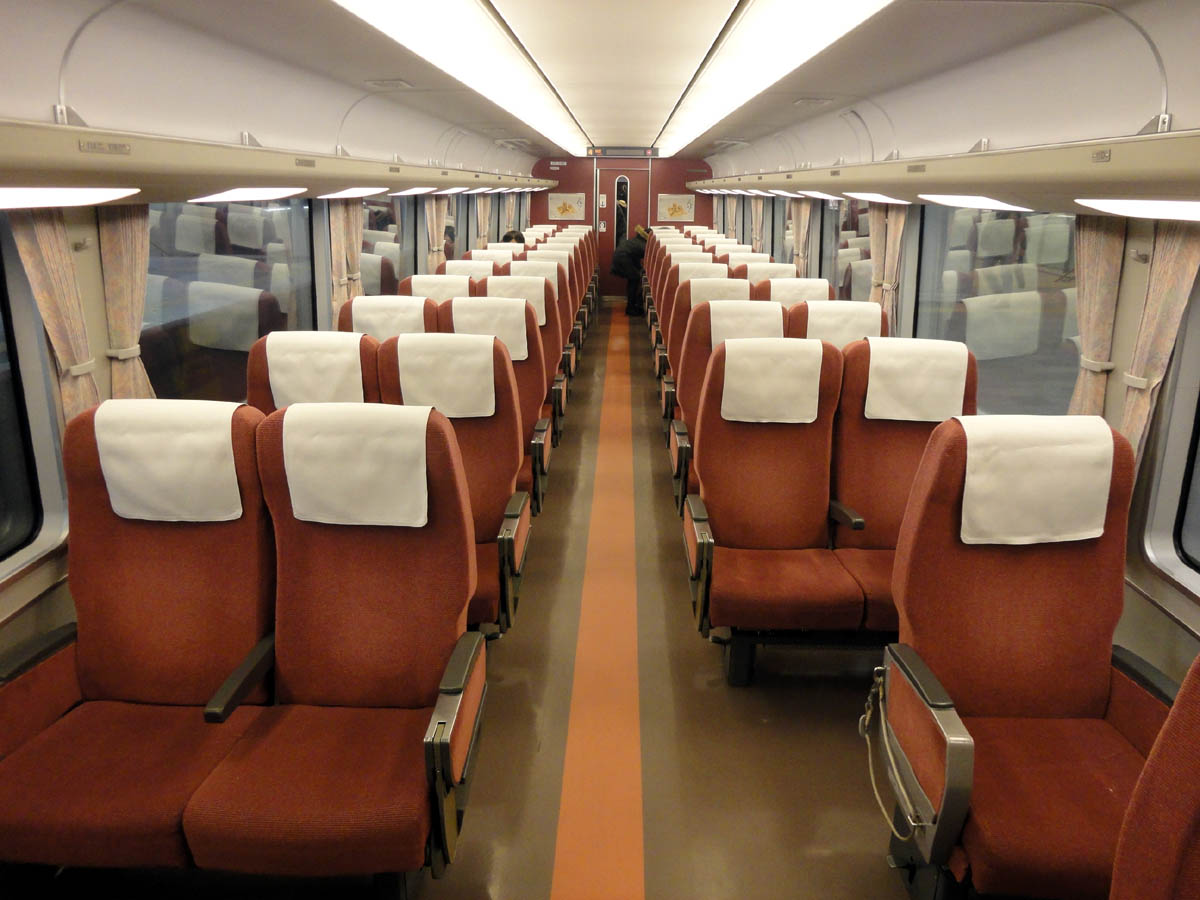
681-1000 series Standard-class saloon

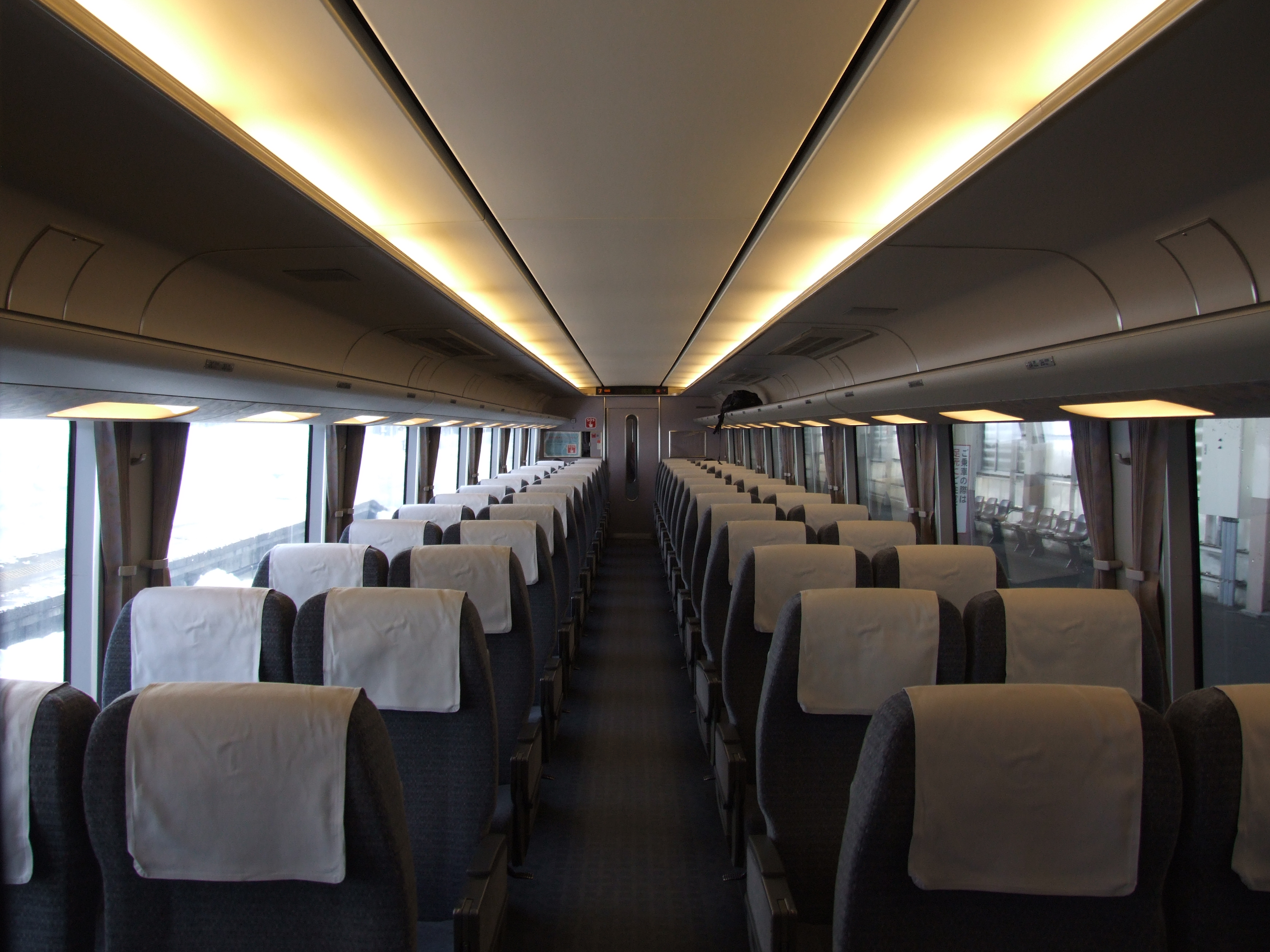
681-0 series odd number car Standard-class saloon

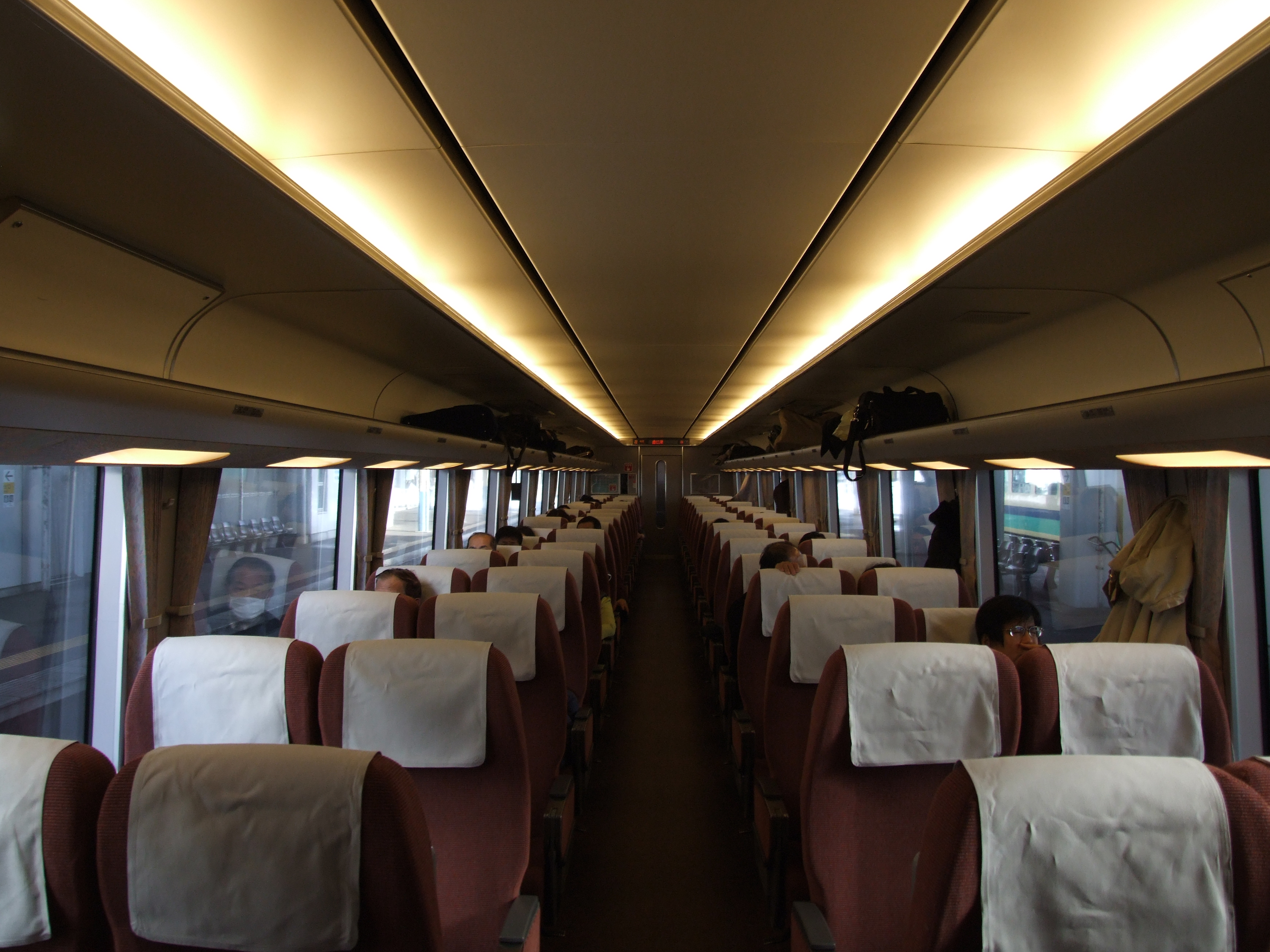
681-0 series even number car Standard-class saloon

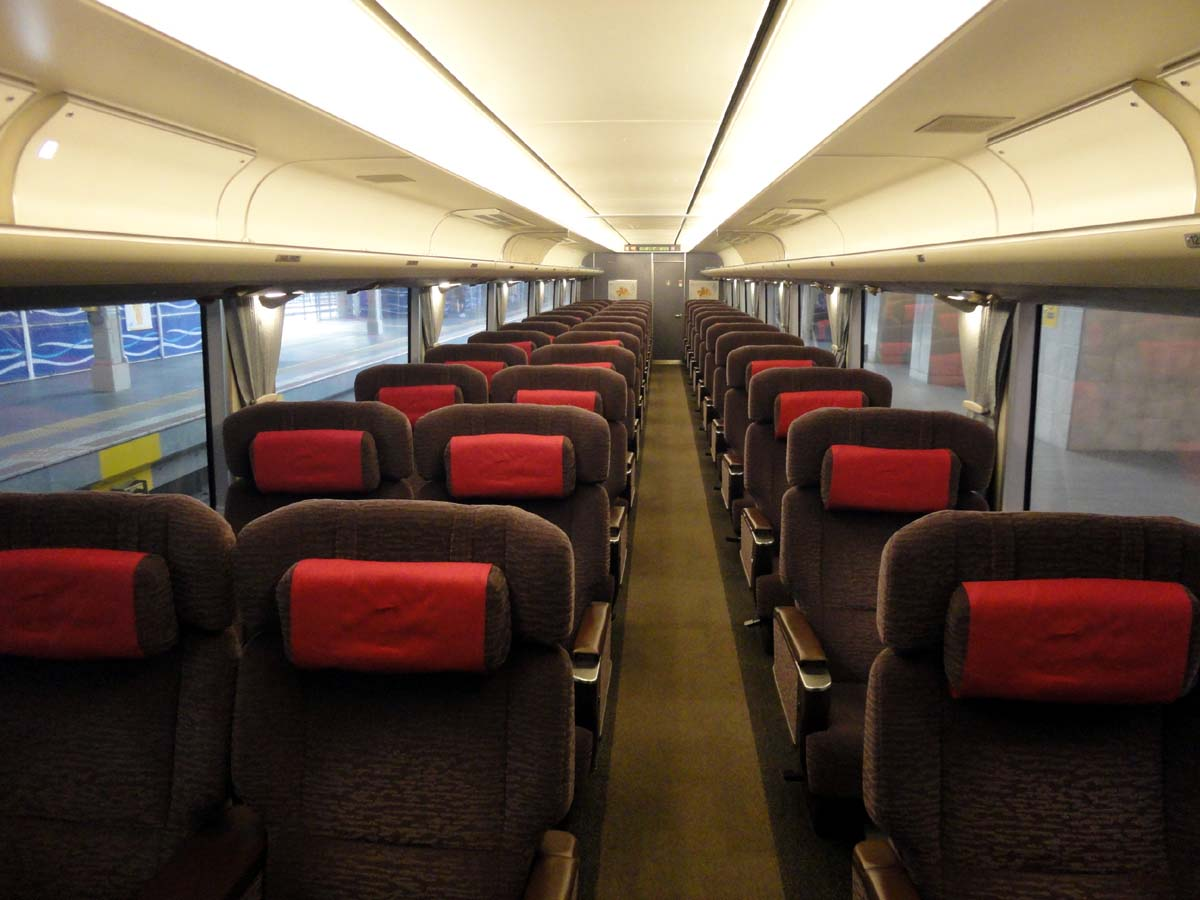
681-0 series Green car saloon

== Refurbishment ==
All of the 681 series trainsets used on Thunderbird limited express services underwent a programme of refurbishment from autumn 2015 until the end of fiscal 2018.
