= Shimizuyama Castle =

- 清水山城
- Takashima, Shiga Prefecture, Japan

Site information
- Type: Yamashiro-style Japanese castle
- Open to the public: yes (no public facilities)
- Condition: ruins

Location
- Shimizuyama Castle Shimizuyama Castle (Japan)
- Coordinates: 35°21′37″N 136°1′11″E

Site history
- Built: 1235
- Built by: Sasaki Takanobu
- In use: Sengoku period
- Demolished: 1572

Shimizuyama Castle (清水山城, Shimizuyama-jō) is a Kamakura to Sengoku period Japanese castle located in the former town of Shin'asahi, now part of Takashima city, in Shiga Prefecture, Japan. It had curved rings arranged in three directions around the main enclosure, and the site of the vassals and other buildings at the foot of the mountain. Its ruins have been protected as a National Historic Site since 2004.

== Overview ==
Shimizuyama Castle was constructed by Sasaki Takanobu in 1235. Sasaki Hideyoshi was the uncle of Minamoto no Yoritomo, and he and his descendants were appointed shugo of Ōmi Province. The Rokkaku, Amago, Kyōgoku and Kuroda clans were all cadet branches of the Sasaki. The Takashima clan was another cadet branch, which controlled Takashima District from their stronghold at Shimizuyama Castle from the Kamakura period until the destruction of the clan at the hands of Oda Nobunaga during his conquest of northern Ōmi Province in 1572.

The castle is located to the south of the center of modern Takashima on the west bank of Lake Biwa in the northwestern part of Shiga Prefecture. The Adogawa and Kamogawa rivers form a plain, and to the west of the north bank of the Adogawa River is the Aibano Plateau at an elevation of about 210 meters. At the foot of the Aibano Plateau, the Nishi-Ōmi Road runs north-to-south, connecting Kyoto with the Sea of Japan, and the Aibagawa, the largest river on the western bank of Lake Biwa, flows to the south. The castle is located at an elevation of 130 to 170 meters above the intersection of the highway with the river, and when built was therefore in a strategic location to control both land and water transpiration in the region.

Shimizuyama Castle consisted of several enclosures on the mountainside, protected with dry moats and earthen embankments, along with ridge-shaped pits, which are rarely seen in the Ōmi area, in two places, on the north and south side of the main enclosure. These pits were a later innovation based on construction techniques developed by the neighboring Azai clan and Asakura clan after the Eiroku period (1558-70). The main enclosure on the ridge extended to the southeast and was L-shaped, measuring approximately 55 meters east-to-west and 60 meters north-to-south. The foundations of a large six by five bay building in the center is considered likely to have been the residence and government center for the Takashima clan. excavated relics include domestic porcelain such as Echizen ware and imported porcelain, as well as metal artifacts and inkstones, all of which date from the middle of the 16th century.

Shimizuyama Castle extended along the hill for about 350 meters north-to-south and about 550 meters east-to-west. The Hondoya Ruins, located on the west side of the Shimizuyama Ruins at an altitude of about 130 meters, also extend 270 meters east-to-west and about 180 meters north-to-south, and are surrounded by a double moat and earthworks; they are considered to be part of the overall Shimizuyama Castle site.

The ruins are located about 35 minutes on foot from Shin-Asahi Station on the JR West Kosei Line.

== See also ==
- List of Historic Sites of Japan (Shiga)
