= Takashima =

Takashima may refer to:

== People with the surname ==
- Gara Takashima (born 1954), Japanese voice actor
- Kazusa Takashima, Japanese manga artist
- Kōbōyama Daizō, Japanese former sumo wrestler now known as Takashima Oyakata
- Mamoru Takashima (高島 守; born 1938), Japanese ice hockey player
- Masahiro Takashima (born 1965), Japanese actor
- Masanobu Takashima (born 1966), Japanese actor, brother of Masahiro
- Misako Takashima, US comic artist
- Norio Takashima (高島 規郎), Japanese table tennis player
- Reiko Takashima (born 1964), Japanese actress
- Saki Takashima (高島 咲季; born 2002), Japanese sprinter
- Shuhan Takashima (1798–1866), 19th-century samurai
- Tomonosuke Takashima (1844–1916), Imperial Japanese Army general
- Yoshimitsu Takashima (born 1941), Japanese politician

=== Characters ===
- Laurel Takashima, character in Babylon 5
- Takashima, fictional villain in the manga No Need for Tenchi!

== Places ==
- Takashima, Nagasaki (Nishisonogi), town
- Takashima, Nagasaki (Kitamatsuura), town
- Takashima District, Shiga
- Takashima, Shiga, city
- Takashima, Shiga (town)
- Takashima, Shimane, island
- Takashima Station, Okayama, Okayama Prefecture
