= Nakae Tōju =

Nakae Tōju 中江 藤樹
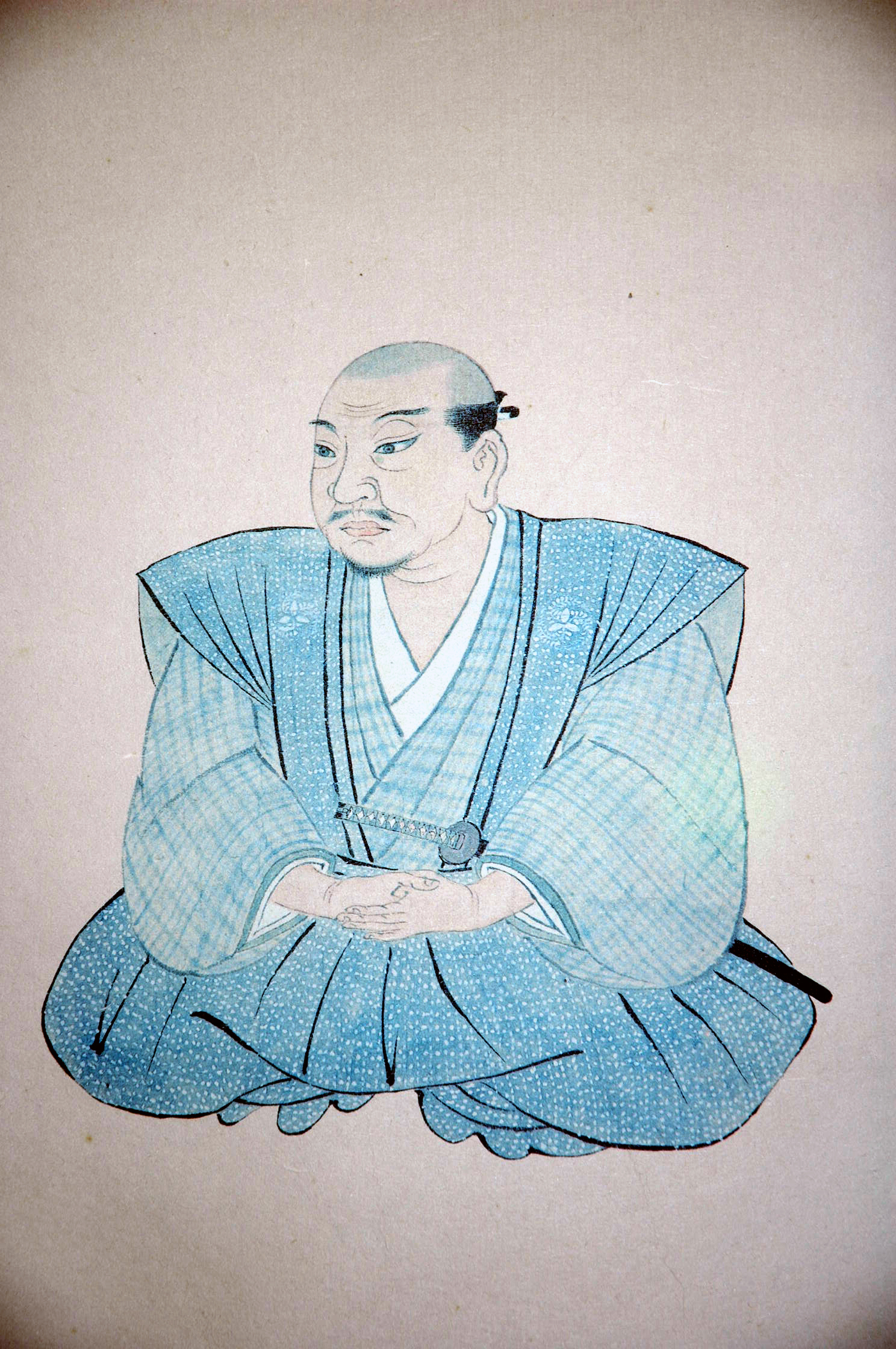
- Nakae Tōju
- Born: April 21, 1608; Takashima, Ōmi Province, Japan
- Died: October 11, 1648 (aged 40); Takashima, Ōmi Province, Japan

Nakae Tōju (中江 藤樹; Japanese pronunciation: [toꜜː.dʑɯ], 21 April 1608 – 11 October 1648) was a writer and Confucian scholar of early Edo period Japan popularly known as "the Sage of Ōmi".

== Biography ==
Nakae was the eldest son of a farmer in Ōmi Province. When he was nine years old, he was adopted by his grandfather, Yoshinaga Tokuzaemon, who was a samurai with a stipend of 150 koku serving Yonago Domain in Hoki Province. In 1617, the daimyō of Yonago, Kato Sadayasu was transferred to Ōzu Domain in Iyo Province and Nakae relocated to Shikoku with his grandparents. In 1622, his grandfather died and Nakae inherited a position with a stipend of 100 koku. However, in 1634, at the age of 27, he left his position without officially resigning due to filial piety for his mother and health reasons. After hiding for a time in Kyoto, he returned to his home village of Ogawa in Ōmi (currently part of Takashima, Shiga, where he opened a private academy for Confucian studies. This was the Tōju Shoin (藤樹書院). The Tōju Shoin takes its name from a giant wisteria which grew behind Nakae's house. His students nicknamed him Mr Wisteria Tree, or "Tōju" in the kanbun pronunciation of its kanji.

In 1637, Nakae married Hisashi, the daughter of a retainer of Ise-Kameyama Domain. Nakae gradually became obsessed with the Cheng–Zhu school, but was also highly influenced by Yangmingism, which argued for the primacy of human intuition or conscience over intellect: moral improvement arises out of conscience-based action (similar to Aristotle's ethics). Nakae added a more religious aspect to Wang's "School of Intuition of Mind", calling the human conscience the "divine light of heaven". Nakae's works also supplied his followers (such as Kumazawa Banzan [1619–1691]) with "the moral foundation for political action". His wife died in 1846 and the following year he remarried to Kuri, the daughter of a retainer of Ōmizo Domain. In early 1848, he rebuilt the Tōju Shoin on a larger scale; however, he died less than half a year later at the age of 41. His grave is at the temple of Tamarin-ji in Takashima.

The Tōju Shoin building was destroyed by a large fire in 1880 along with 34 nearby farmhouses. The current structure is a reconstruction built in 1882, but on a smaller scale than the original. It was designated a National Historic Site in 1922, with the area under protection expanded in 2007. It is about a 15-minute walk from Adogawa Station on the JR Kosei Line.

Nakae was unusual in teaching that humanism transcended social status or gender, and that his teachings would be useful to women as well as men. While accepting the then standard view of women as usually lacking such virtues as compassion and honesty, he argued: "if a wife's disposition is healthy and pious, obedient, sympathetic and honest, then ... every member of her family will be at peace and the entire household in perfect order." His teachings spread widely not only to samurai but also to farmers, merchants, and craftsmen, and has been spontaneously called "Ōmi saint" since the middle of the Edo period. His later disciples included Yoshida Shoin.

== Gallery ==
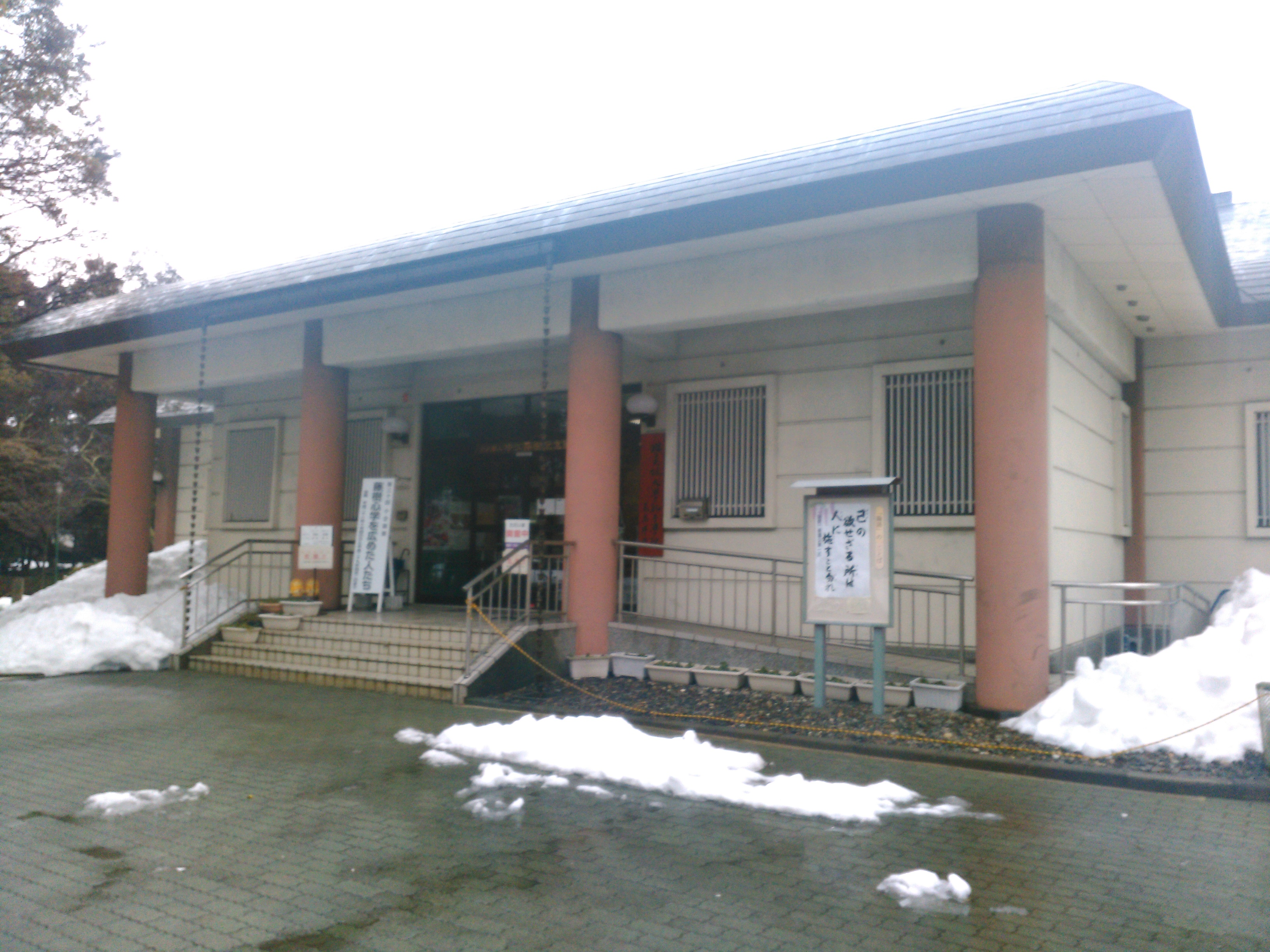
Nakae Tōju Memorial Museum, Takashima

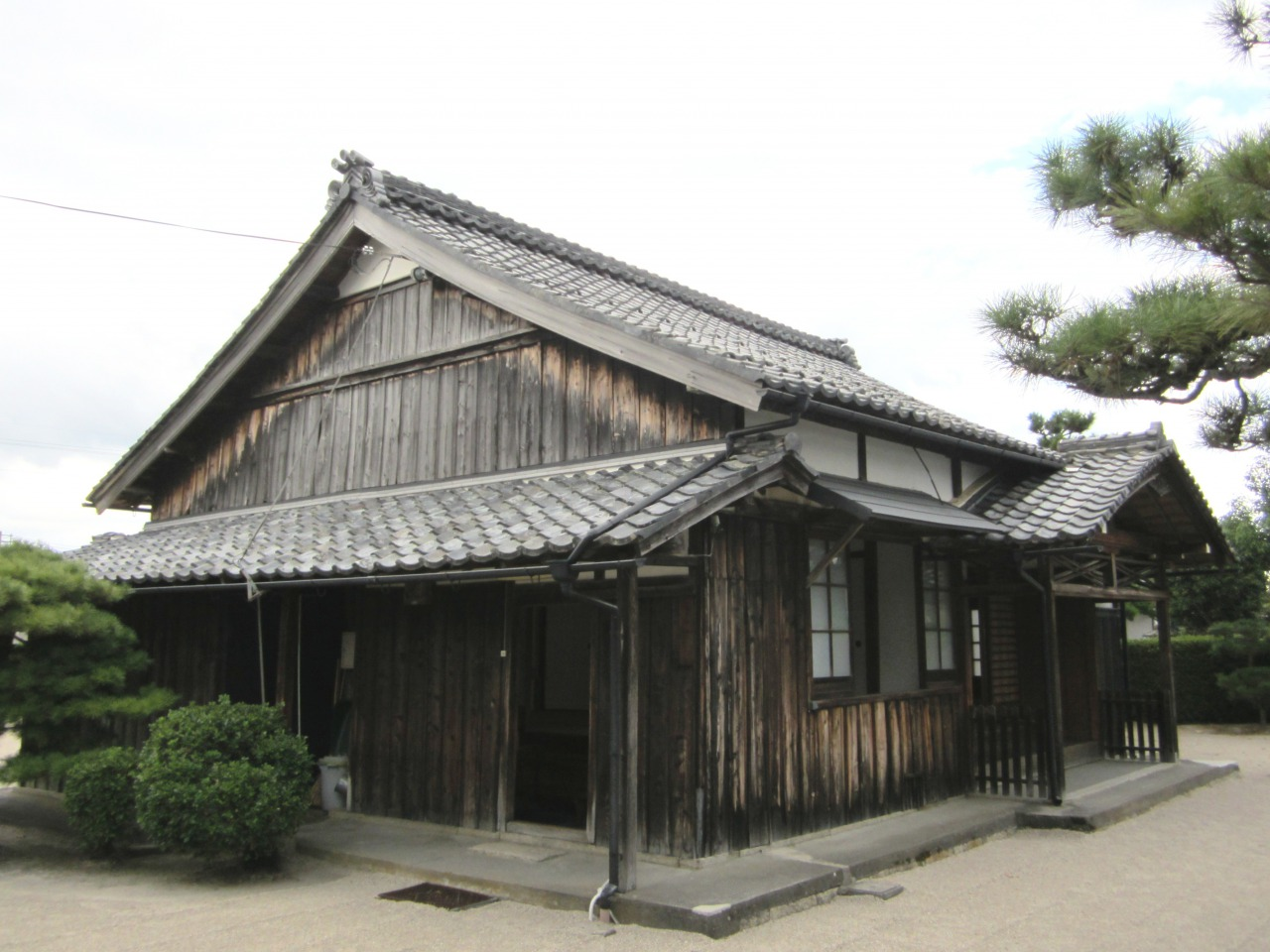
Tōju Shoin

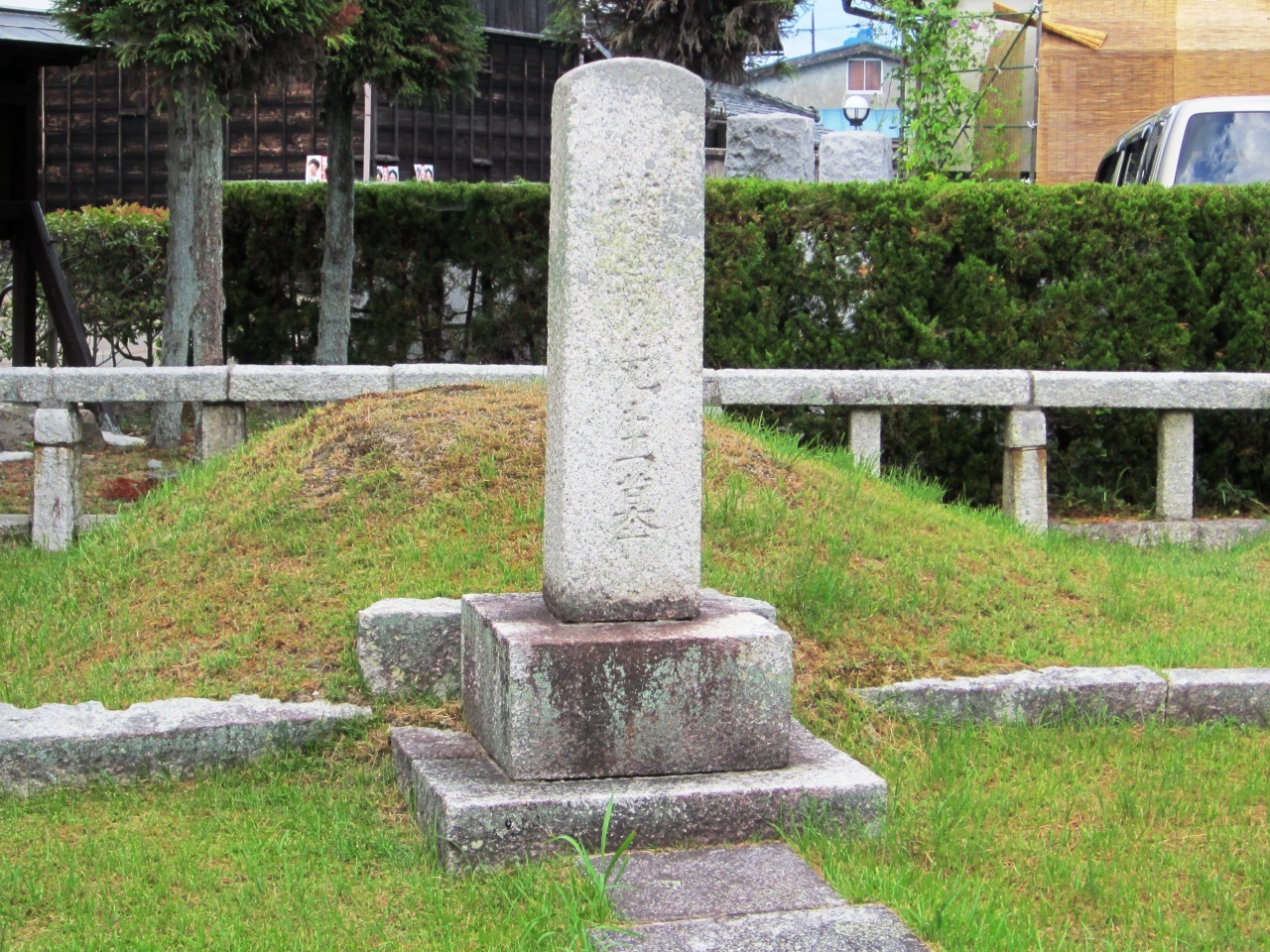
Nakae Tōju grave at Tamarin-ji

== Selected works ==
In a statistical overview derived from writings by and about Nakae Tōju, OCLC/WorldCat encompasses roughly 130+ works in 200 publications in 5 languages and 740+ library holdings.

- 1650 -- Dialogue with the elder (Okina mondō).
- 藤樹遺稿 (1795)
- 翁問答 (1831)
- 藤樹全書: 中江藤樹先生遺稿 (1893)
- 中江藤樹文集 (1914)
- 孝經五種 (1925)
- Nakae Tōju sensei zenshu (1928)
- 鑑草; 附・春風; 陰騭 (1939)
- 藤樹先生全集 (1940)
- 中江藤樹・熊沢蕃山集 (1966)
- 中江藤樹 (1974)
- 中江藤樹・熊沢蕃山 (1976)

== See also ==
- List of Historic Sites of Japan (Shiga)
