= Adogawa, Shiga =

Dissolved municipality in Shiga prefecture, Japan

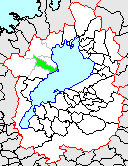
Location of Adogawa

Adogawa (安曇川町, Adogawa-chō) was a town located in Takashima District, Shiga Prefecture, Japan.

As of 2003, the town had an estimated population of 14,245 and a density of 293.89 persons per km^{2}. The total area was 48.47 km^{2}.

On January 1, 2005, Adogawa, along with the towns of Takashima, Imazu, Makino and Shin'asahi, and the village of Kutsuki (all from Takashima District), was merged to create the city of Takashima.

Adogawa is one of the more densely populated areas in Takashima City. There are many stores around the JR Adogawa Station.

Adogawa is well known for its fan ribs (the wooden part that comprises the skeleton of traditional Japanese hand fans), and roughly 80% of fan ribs made in Japan come from Adogawa.

In Adogawa, there is one prefectural high school, one junior high school, and five elementary schools. There are plans to create a new prefectural middle school within Adogawa High School by 2008.
