= Shin'asahi, Shiga =

Dissolved municipality in Shiga prefecture, Japan

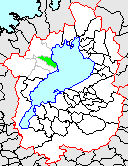
Location of Shin'asahi

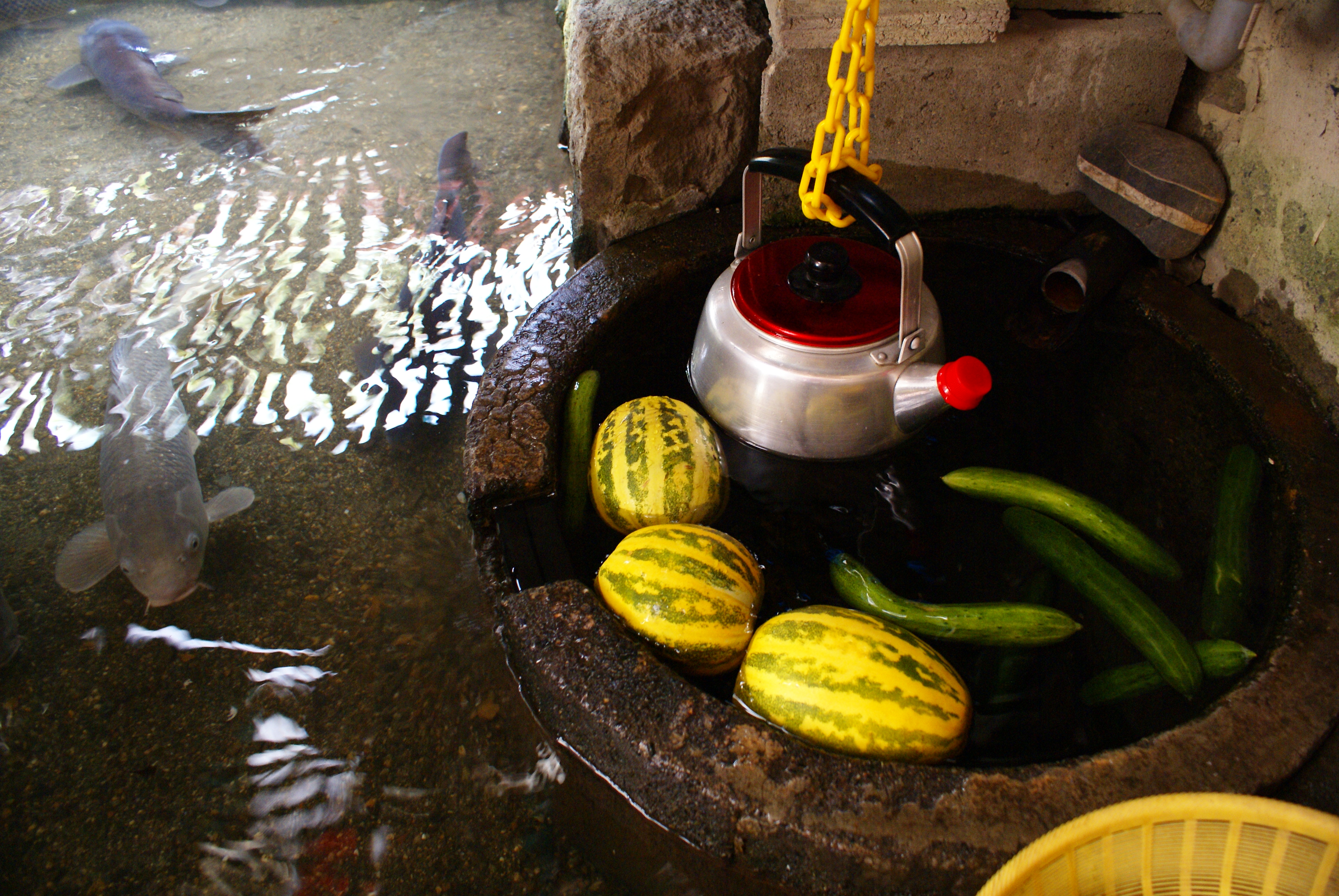
Natural clear water in Harie area

Shin'asahi (新旭町, Shin'asahi-chō) was a town located in Takashima District, Shiga Prefecture, Japan.

== Population ==
As of 2003, the town had an estimated population of 11,188 and a density of 340.68 persons per km^{2}. The total area was 32.84 km^{2}.

== History ==
On January 1, 2005, Shin'asahi, along with the towns of Takashima, Adogawa, Imazu and Makino, and the village of Kutsuki (all from Takashima District), was merged to create the city of Takashima.

== Etymology ==
"Shin'asahi" means "new sunrise" which derives from its western position on Lake Biwa.

== Access ==
Shin'asahi has a stop on the JR Kosei Line Shin-Asahi Station.

== Attractions ==
Shin'asahi is famous for it natural clear water that are taken from natural sources close to the town. There is at least one sake brewery in town which takes advantage of the availability of the water.

The area of Lake Biwa is fantastic for its natural surroundings. It has monkeys, bears and giant bamboo. Don't be surprised to see children walking to school wearing bear bells, even though bear attacks are much rarer than in other parts of the world.

Water sports including swimming and windsurfing are activities during the summer. Winter activities include snowboarding in the nearby mountains.
