= Kutsuki, Shiga =

Dissolved municipality in Shiga prefecture, Japan

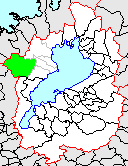
Location of Kutsuki

Kutsuki (朽木村, Kutsuki-mura) was a village located in Takashima District, Shiga Prefecture, Japan.

As of 2003, the village had an estimated population of 2,546 and a density of 15.36 persons per km^{2}. The total area was 165.77 km^{2}.

On January 1, 2005, Kutsuki, along with the towns of Takashima, Adogawa, Imazu, Makino and Shin'asahi (all from Takashima District), was merged to create the city of Takashima.
