= Nagahara Station (Shiga) =

Railway station in Nagahama, Shiga Prefecture, Japan

Nagahara Station 永原駅
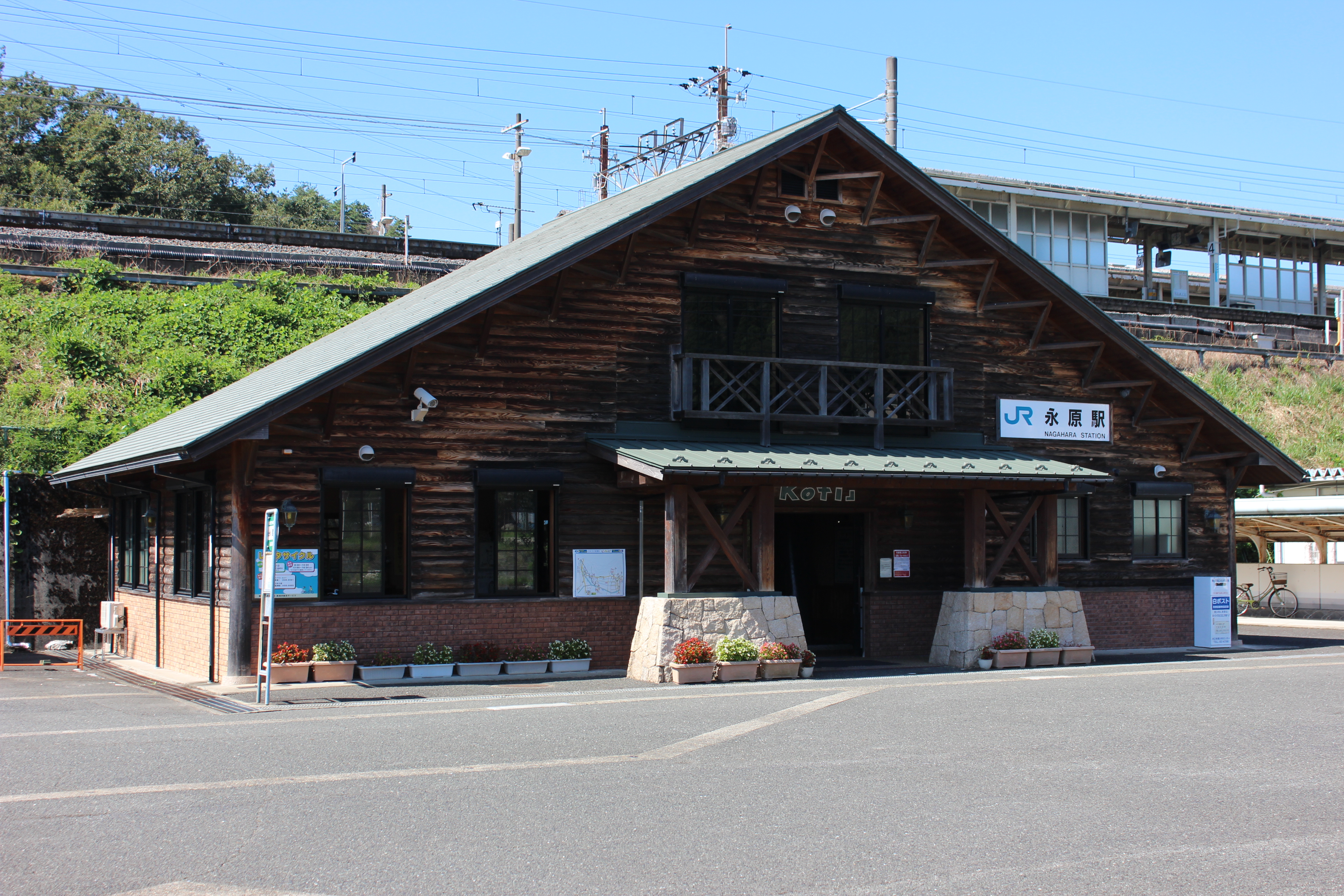
- Nagahara Station, August 2020

General information
- Location: Nishiazaicho Oura, Nagahama-shi, Shiga-ken 529-0721; Japan
- Coordinates: 35°29′55.8″N 136°7′20.09″E
- Operator: JR West
- Line: Kosei Line
- Distance: 68.3 km from Yamashina
- Platforms: 2 island platforms
- Tracks: 4
- Connections: Bus stop

Construction
- Structure type: Elevated (embankment)
- Accessible: No

Other information
- Station code: JR-B11
- Website: Official website

History
- Opened: 20 July 1974

Passengers
- FY 2023: 180 daily

Services
| Preceding station | JR West | Following station |
|---|---|---|
| Makino towards Kyoto | Kosei Line Local Rapid Special Rapid | Omi-Shiotsu towards Tsuruga |
Location
- Location within Shiga Prefecture Location within Japan

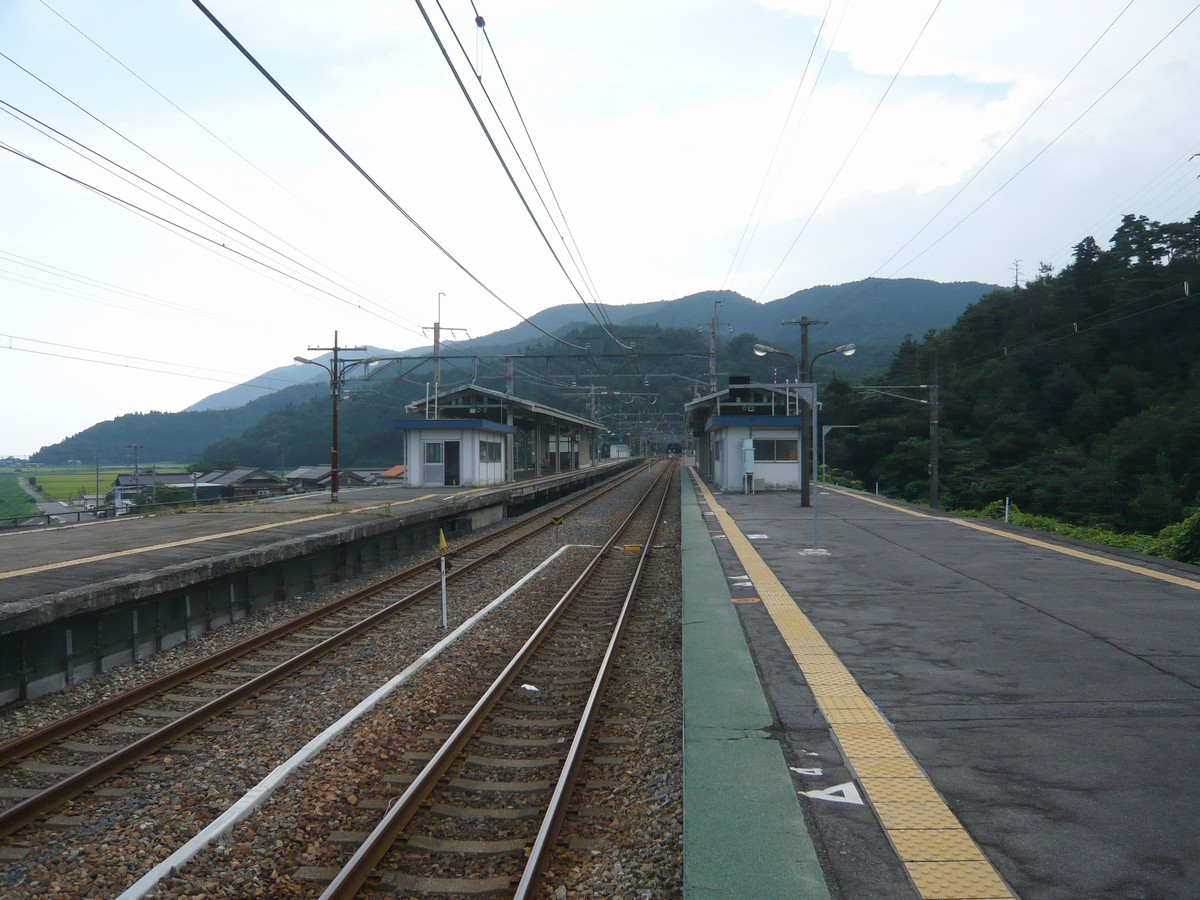
Platforms and tracks

Nagahara Station (永原駅, Nagahara-eki) is a passenger railway station located in the city of Nagahama, Shiga Prefecture, Japan, operated by the West Japan Railway Company (JR West).

== Lines ==
Nagahara Station is served by the Kosei Line, and is 68.3 kilometres (42.4 miles) from the starting point of the line at Yamashina and 73.8 kilometres (45.9 miles) from Kyoto.

== Station layout ==
The station consists of two island platforms on an embankment, connected by an underground passage to the station building. The station is unattended.

== Platforms ==
| 1, 2 | ■ Kosei Line | for Ōmi-Shiotsu and Tsuruga |
| 3, 4 | ■ Kosei Line | for Ōmi-Imazu and Kyoto |

== History ==
The station opened on 20 July 1974 as a station on the Japan National Railway (JNR). The station became part of the West Japan Railway Company on 1 April 1987 due to the privatization and dissolution of the JNR.

Station numbering was introduced in March 2018 with Nagahara being assigned station number JR-B11.

== Passenger statistics ==
In fiscal 2019, the station was used by an average of 102 passengers daily (boarding passengers only).

== Surrounding area ==
- Nagahama City Hall Nishi-Asai Branch
- Nagahama City Nagahara Elementary School
- Japan National Route 303

== See also ==
- List of railway stations in Japan
