= Makino, Shiga =

Makino マキノ町 まきのちょう
- Town
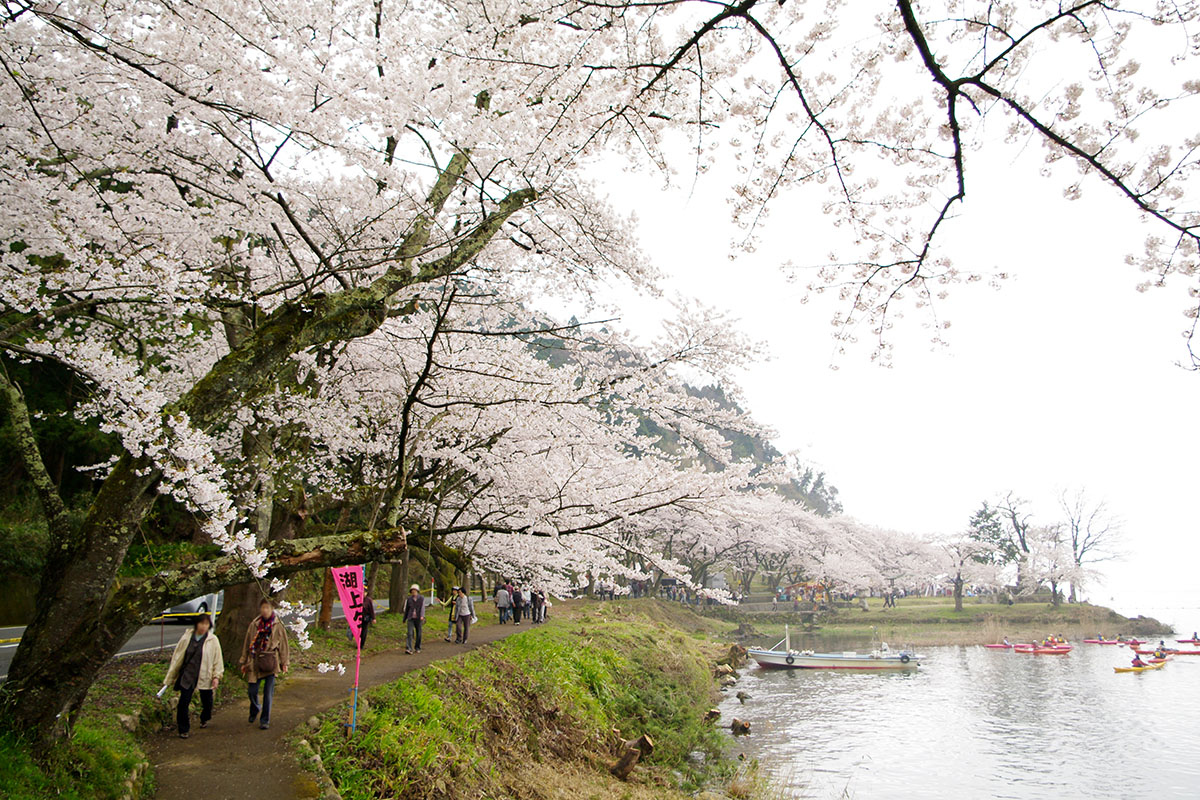

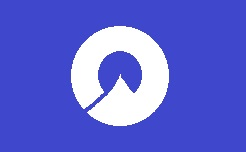
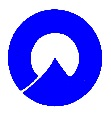
- Flag Seal
- Interactive map of Makino
- Country: Japan
- Region: Kansai
- Prefecture: Shiga
- District: Takashima
- Merged: January 1, 2005

Area
  - Total: 78.34 km^{2} (30.25 sq mi)

Population
  - Estimate (2004): 6,232

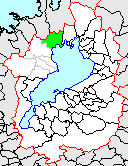
Location of Makino

Makino (マキノ町, Makino-chō) was a town located in Takashima District, Shiga Prefecture, Japan.

As of 2003, the town had an estimated population of 6,230 and a density of 79.53 per km^{2}. The total area was 78.34 km^{2}.

On January 1, 2005, Makino, along with the towns of Takashima, Adogawa, Imazu and Shin'asahi, and the village of Kutsuki (all from Takashima District), was merged to create the city of Takashima.
