= Imazu, Shiga =

Dissolved municipality in Shiga prefecture, Japan

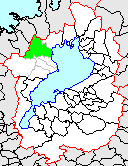
Location of Imazu

Imazu (今津町, Imazu-chō) was a town located in Takashima District, Shiga Prefecture, Japan. It was the center of the district.

As of 2003, the town had an estimated population of 14,018 and a density of 114.21 persons per km^{2}. The total area is 122.74 km^{2}.

On January 1, 2005, Imazu, along with the towns of Takashima, Adogawa, Makino and Shin'asahi, and the village of Kutsuki (all from Takashima District), was merged to create the city of Takashima.

== Climate ==
Climate data for Imazu (1991−2020 normals, extremes 1978−present)
Month	Jan	Feb	Mar	Apr	May	Jun	Jul	Aug	Sep	Oct	Nov	Dec	Year
Record high °C (°F)	16.1 (61.0)	18.0 (64.4)	22.1 (71.8)	26.9 (80.4)	29.7 (85.5)	33.3 (91.9)	36.2 (97.2)	36.9 (98.4)	35.2 (95.4)	30.9 (87.6)	22.8 (73.0)	18.3 (64.9)	36.9 (98.4)
Mean daily maximum °C (°F)	6.3 (43.3)	6.9 (44.4)	11.0 (51.8)	16.9 (62.4)	21.9 (71.4)	25.3 (77.5)	29.2 (84.6)	31.0 (87.8)	27.1 (80.8)	21.4 (70.5)	15.2 (59.4)	9.3 (48.7)	18.5 (65.2)
Daily mean °C (°F)	2.8 (37.0)	3.1 (37.6)	6.4 (43.5)	11.7 (53.1)	17.0 (62.6)	21.2 (70.2)	25.1 (77.2)	26.4 (79.5)	22.7 (72.9)	16.8 (62.2)	10.7 (51.3)	5.4 (41.7)	14.1 (57.4)
Mean daily minimum °C (°F)	−0.4 (31.3)	−0.4 (31.3)	2.0 (35.6)	6.8 (44.2)	12.5 (54.5)	17.5 (63.5)	21.8 (71.2)	22.8 (73.0)	18.9 (66.0)	12.6 (54.7)	6.5 (43.7)	1.9 (35.4)	10.2 (50.4)
Record low °C (°F)	−10.6 (12.9)	−11.7 (10.9)	−8.4 (16.9)	−1.7 (28.9)	3.4 (38.1)	7.1 (44.8)	12.6 (54.7)	12.8 (55.0)	9.8 (49.6)	1.6 (34.9)	−2.0 (28.4)	−8.0 (17.6)	−11.7 (10.9)
Average precipitation mm (inches)	192.5 (7.58)	144.2 (5.68)	139.9 (5.51)	126.6 (4.98)	167.0 (6.57)	175.1 (6.89)	225.5 (8.88)	142.2 (5.60)	194.4 (7.65)	148.5 (5.85)	112.9 (4.44)	178.1 (7.01)	1,946.9 (76.65)
Average snowfall cm (inches)	110 (43)	102 (40)	14 (5.5)	0 (0)	0 (0)	0 (0)	0 (0)	0 (0)	0 (0)	0 (0)	0 (0)	34 (13)	258 (102)
Average precipitation days (≥ 1.0 mm)	19.6	16.9	15.1	11.7	10.9	11.2	13.0	9.1	11.3	10.9	12.2	17.9	159.8
Average snowy days (≥ 3 cm)	10.0	9.0	1.4	0	0	0	0	0	0	0	0	2.8	23.2
Mean monthly sunshine hours	79.0	86.1	137.9	174.6	187.1	141.4	150.9	198.3	148.6	141.4	117.0	92.3	1,654.6
Source: JMA
