= Ōmi-Takashima Station =

Railway station in Takashima, Shiga Prefecture, Japan

Ōmi-Takashima Station 近江高島駅
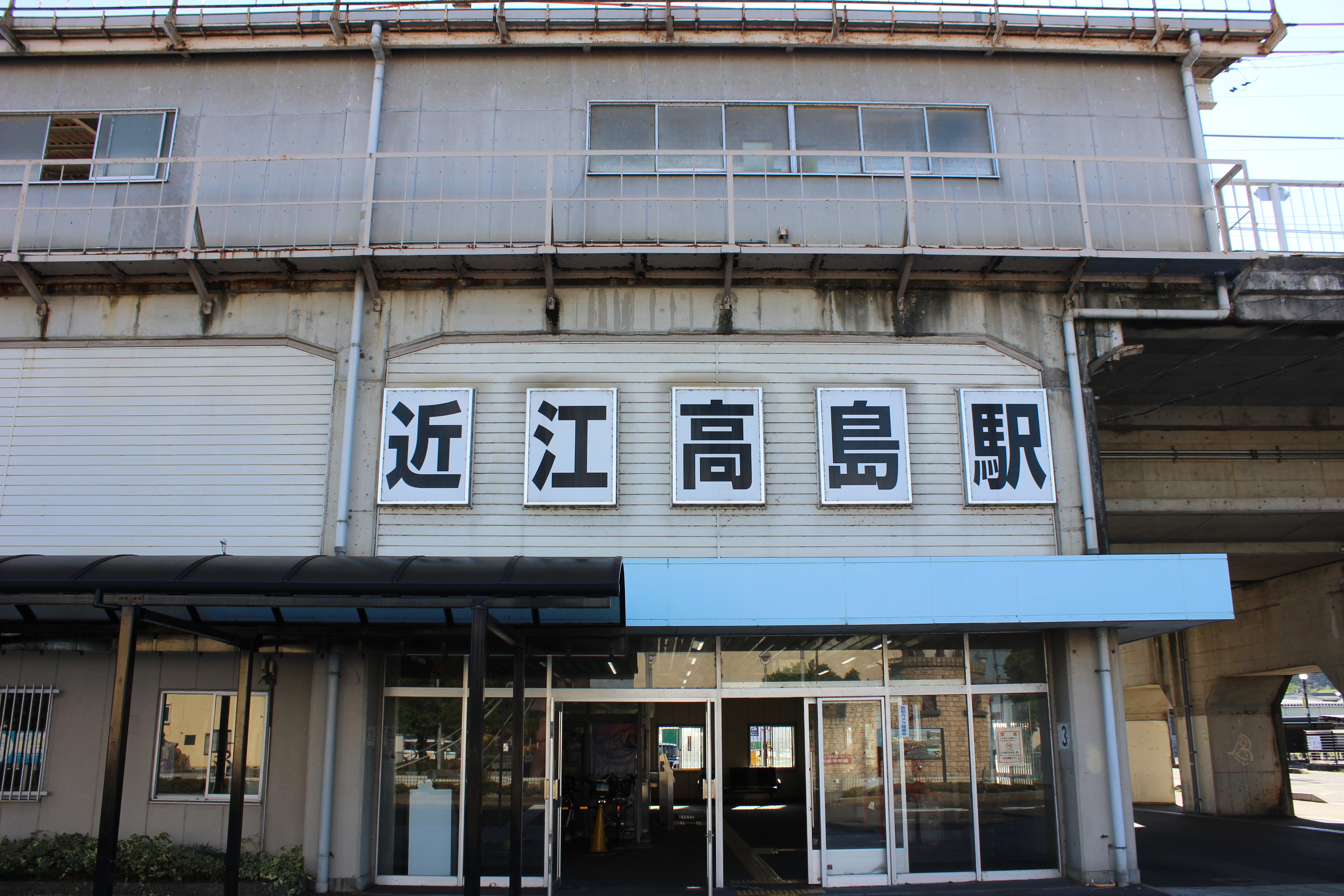
- Ōmi-Takashima Station

General information
- Location: Katsuno, Takashima-shi, Shiga-ken 520-1121; Japan
- Coordinates: 35.2926°N 136.0106°E
- Operator: JR West
- Line: Kosei Line
- Distance: 40.9 km from Yamashina
- Platforms: 2 side platforms
- Tracks: 2

Construction
- Structure type: Elevated
- Accessible: None

Other information
- Station code: JR-B17
- Website: Official website

History
- Opened: 20 July 1974

Passengers
- FY 2023: 1,386 daily

Services
Preceding station	JR West	Following station
Omi-Takashima towards Kyoto	Kosei Line Local Rapid Special Rapid	Adogawa towards Tsuruga
Location
- Location within Shiga Prefecture Location within Japan

Ōmi-Takashima Station (近江高島駅, Ōmi-Takashima-eki) is a passenger railway station located in the city of Takashima, Shiga Prefecture, Japan, operated by the West Japan Railway Company (JR West).

== Lines ==
Ōmi-Takashima Station is served by the Kosei Line, and is 40.9 kilometres (25.4 miles) from the starting point of the line at Yamashina and 46.4 kilometres (28.8 miles) from Kyoto.

== Station layout ==
The station consists of two opposed elevated side platforms with the station building underneath. The station is staffed.

== Platforms ==
1	■ Kosei Line	for Ōmi-Imazu and Tsuruga
2	■ Kosei Line	for Katata and Kyoto

== History ==
The station opened on 20 July 1974, as a station on the Japan National Railway (JNR). The station became part of the West Japan Railway Company on 1 April 1987, due to the privatization and dissolution of the JNR.

Station numbering was introduced in March 2018 with Ōmi-Takashima being assigned station number JR-B17.

== Passenger statistics ==
In fiscal 2019, the station was used by an average of 822 passengers daily (boarding passengers only).

== Surrounding area ==
- Takashima City Hall Takashima Branch
- Takashima Municipal Hospital
- Takashima City Takashima Junior High School
- Takashima City Takashima Elementary School

== See also ==
- List of railway stations in Japan
