= Ōmi-Nakashō Station =

Railway station in Takashima, Shiga Prefecture, Japan

Ōmi-Nakashō Station 近江中庄駅
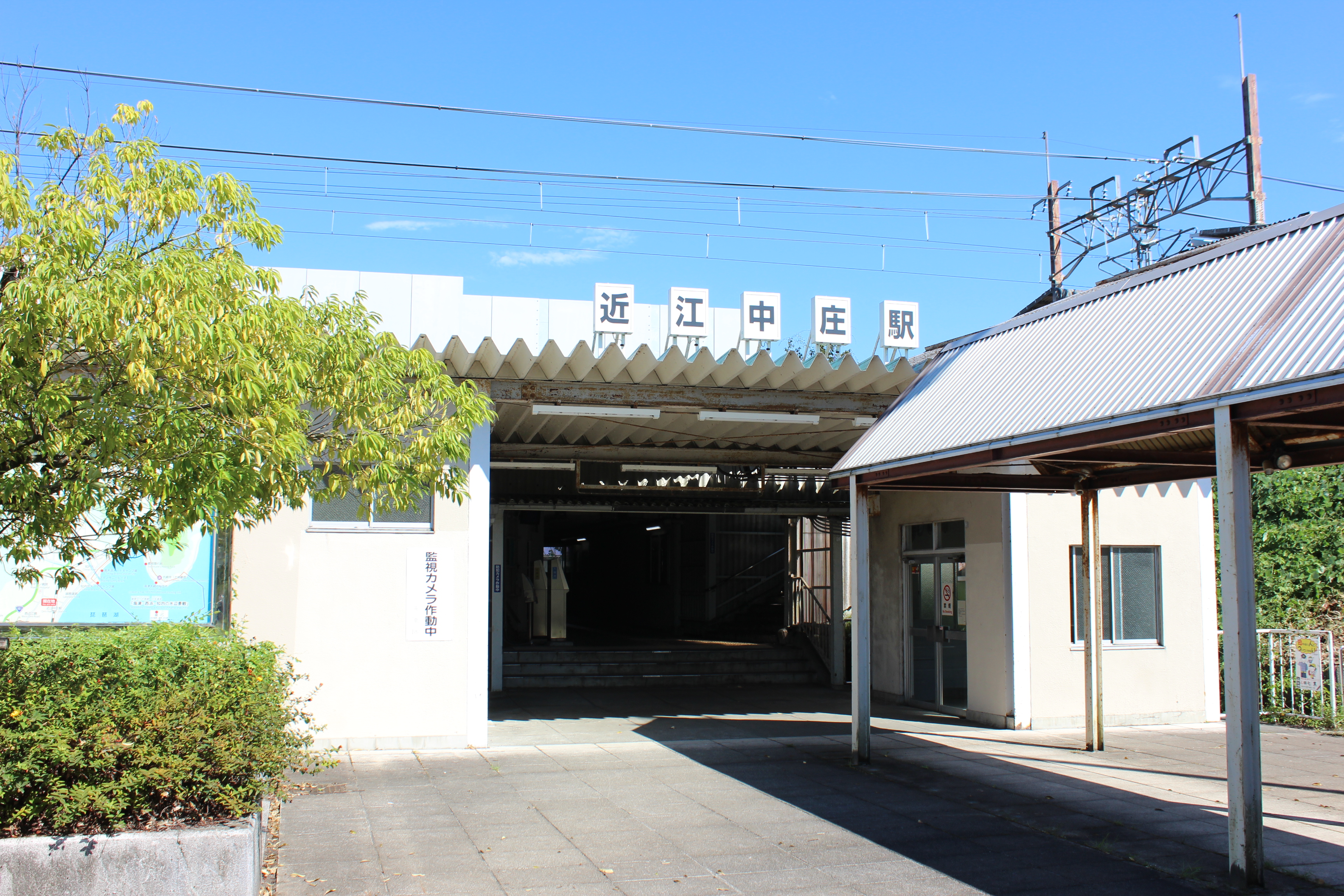
- Ōmi-Nakashō Station, August 2020

General information
- Location: Makino-cho Nakashonakashita 1043 917-2, Takashima-shi, Shiga-ken 520-1823; Japan
- Coordinates: 35.4414°N 136.0385°E
- Operator: JR West
- Line: Kosei Line
- Distance: 58.0 km from Yamashina
- Platforms: 2 side platforms
- Tracks: 2
- Connections: Bus stop

Construction
- Structure type: Elevated
- Accessible: None

Other information
- Station code: JR-B13
- Website: Official website

History
- Opened: 20 July 1974

Passengers
- FY 2023: 208 daily

Services
Preceding station	JR West	Following station
Omi-Imazu towards Kyoto	Kosei Line Local Rapid Special Rapid	Makino towards Tsuruga
Location
- Location within Shiga Prefecture Location within Japan

Ōmi-Nakashō Station (近江中庄駅, Ōmi-Nakashō-eki) is a passenger railway station located in the city of Takashima, Shiga Prefecture, Japan, operated by the West Japan Railway Company (JR West).

== Lines ==
Ōmi-Nakashō Station is served by the Kosei Line, and is 58.0 kilometres (36.0 miles) from the starting point of the line at Yamashina and 63.5 kilometres (39.5 miles) from Kyoto.

== Station layout ==
The station consists of two opposed elevated side platforms with the station building underneath. The station is staffed.

== Platforms ==
1	■ Kosei Line	for Ōmi-Shiotsu and Tsuruga
2	■ Kosei Line	for Ōmi-Imazu and Kyoto

== History ==
The station opened on 20 July 1974 as a station on the Japan National Railway (JNR). The station became part of the West Japan Railway Company on 1 April 1987 due to the privatization and dissolution of the JNR.

Station numbering was introduced in March 2018 with Ōmi-Nakashō being assigned station number JR-B13.

== Passenger statistics ==
In fiscal 2019, the station was used by an average of 124 passengers daily (boarding passengers only).

== Surrounding area ==
- Makino Hospital
- Japan National Route 161

== See also ==
- List of railway stations in Japan
