= Makino Station (Shiga) =

Railway station in Takashima, Shiga Prefecture, Japan

Makino Station マキノ駅
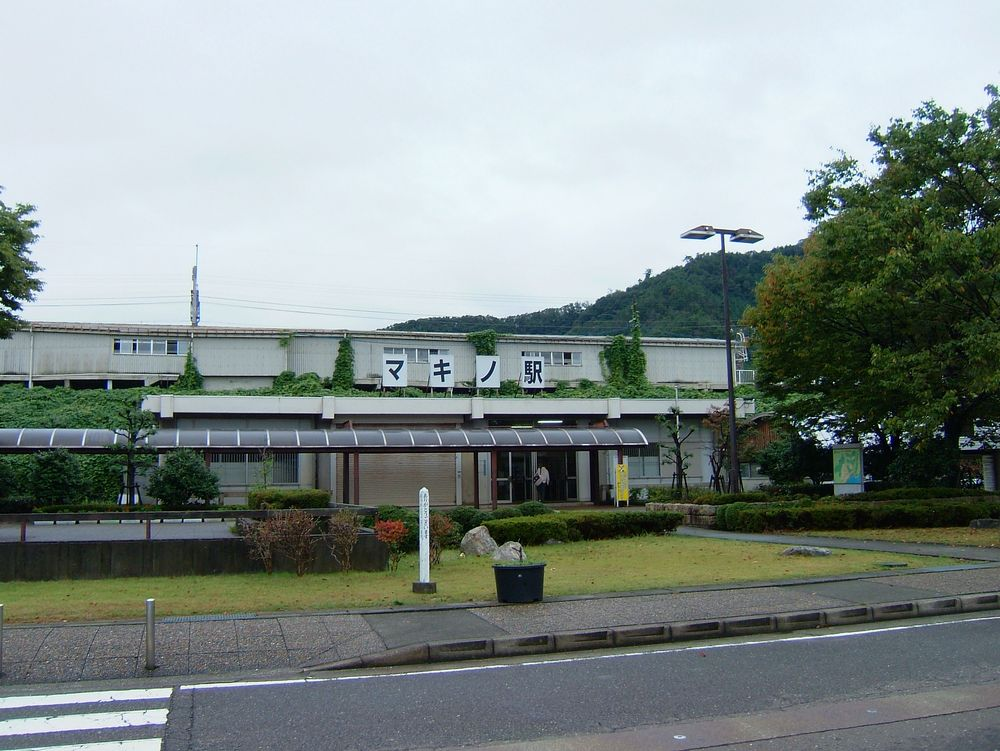
- Makino Station, September 2006

General information
- Location: Makino-cho Nishihama Kanda 1243, Takashima-shi, Shiga-ken 520-1812; Japan
- Coordinates: 35.4613°N 136.0595°E
- Operator: JR West
- Line: Kosei Line
- Distance: 61.2 km from Yamashina
- Platforms: 2 side platforms
- Tracks: 2
- Connections: Bus stop

Construction
- Structure type: Elevated
- Accessible: None

Other information
- Station code: JR-B12
- Website: Official website

History
- Opened: 20 July 1974

Passengers
- FY 2023: 512 daily

Services
Preceding station	JR West	Following station
Omi-Nakasho towards Kyoto	Kosei Line Local Rapid Special Rapid	Nagahara towards Tsuruga
Location
- Location within Shiga Prefecture Location within Japan

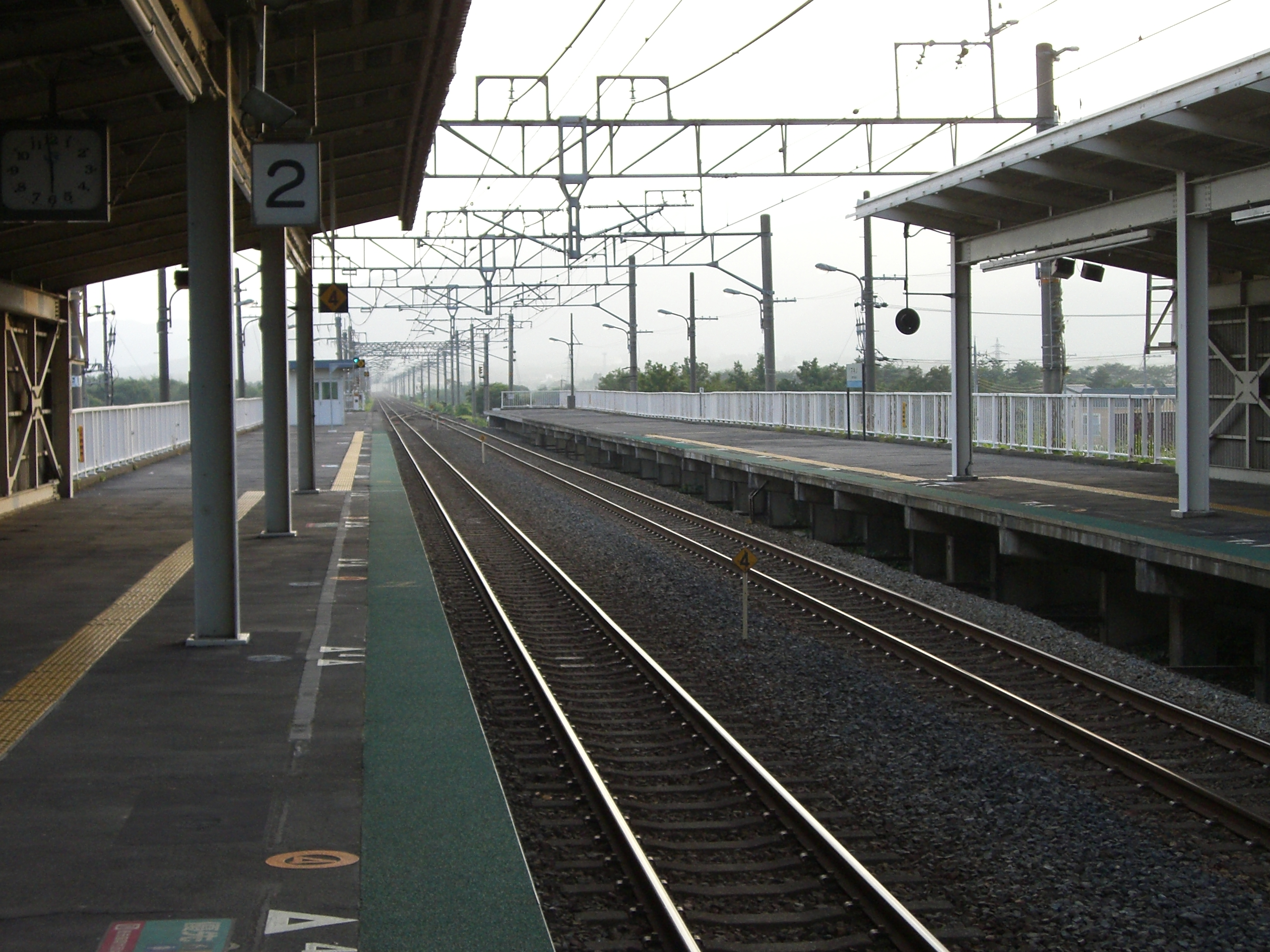
Platforms and tracks, August 2006

Makino Station (マキノ駅, Makino-eki) is a passenger railway station located in the city of Takashima, Shiga Prefecture, Japan, operated by the West Japan Railway Company (JR West).

== Lines ==
Makino Station is served by the Kosei Line, and is 61.2 kilometres (38.0 miles) from the starting point of the line at Yamashina and 66.8 kilometres (41.5 miles) kilometers from Kyoto.

== Station layout ==
The station consists of two opposed elevated side platforms with the station building underneath. The station is staffed.

== Platforms ==
1	■ Kosei Line	for Ōmi-Shiotsu and Tsuruga
2	■ Kosei Line	for Ōmi-Imazu and Kyoto

== Adjacent stations ==
«	Service	»
Kosei Line
Ōmi-Nakashō	Special rapid service	Nagahara
Ōmi-Nakashō	Rapid service	Nagahara
Ōmi-Nakashō	Local	Nagahara

== History ==
The station was opened on 20 July 1974 as a station on the Japan National Railway (JNR). The station became part of the West Japan Railway Company on 1 April 1987 due to the privatization and dissolution of the JNR.

Station numbering was introduced in March 2018 with Makino being assigned station number JR-B12.

== Passenger statistics ==
In fiscal 2019, the station was used by an average of 309 passengers daily (boarding passengers only).

== Surrounding area ==
- Lake Biwa
- Japan National Route 161

== See also ==
- List of railway stations in Japan
