= Takashima, Shiga (town) =

Dissolved municipality in Shiga prefecture, Japan

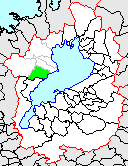
Location of Takashima

Takashima (高島町, Takashima-chō) was a town located in Takashima District, Shiga Prefecture, Japan. In the Edo period, Ōmizo Domain was based here.

== Population ==
On December 1, 2004, the town had an estimated population of 7,086 and a density of 112.12 persons per km^{2}. The total area was 63.20 km^{2}.

== History ==
On January 1, 2005, Takashima absorbed the towns of Adogawa, Imazu, Makino and Shin'asahi, and the village of Kutsuki (all from Takashima District) to create the city of Takashima.
