= Takashima, Shiga =

Takashima 高島市
- City
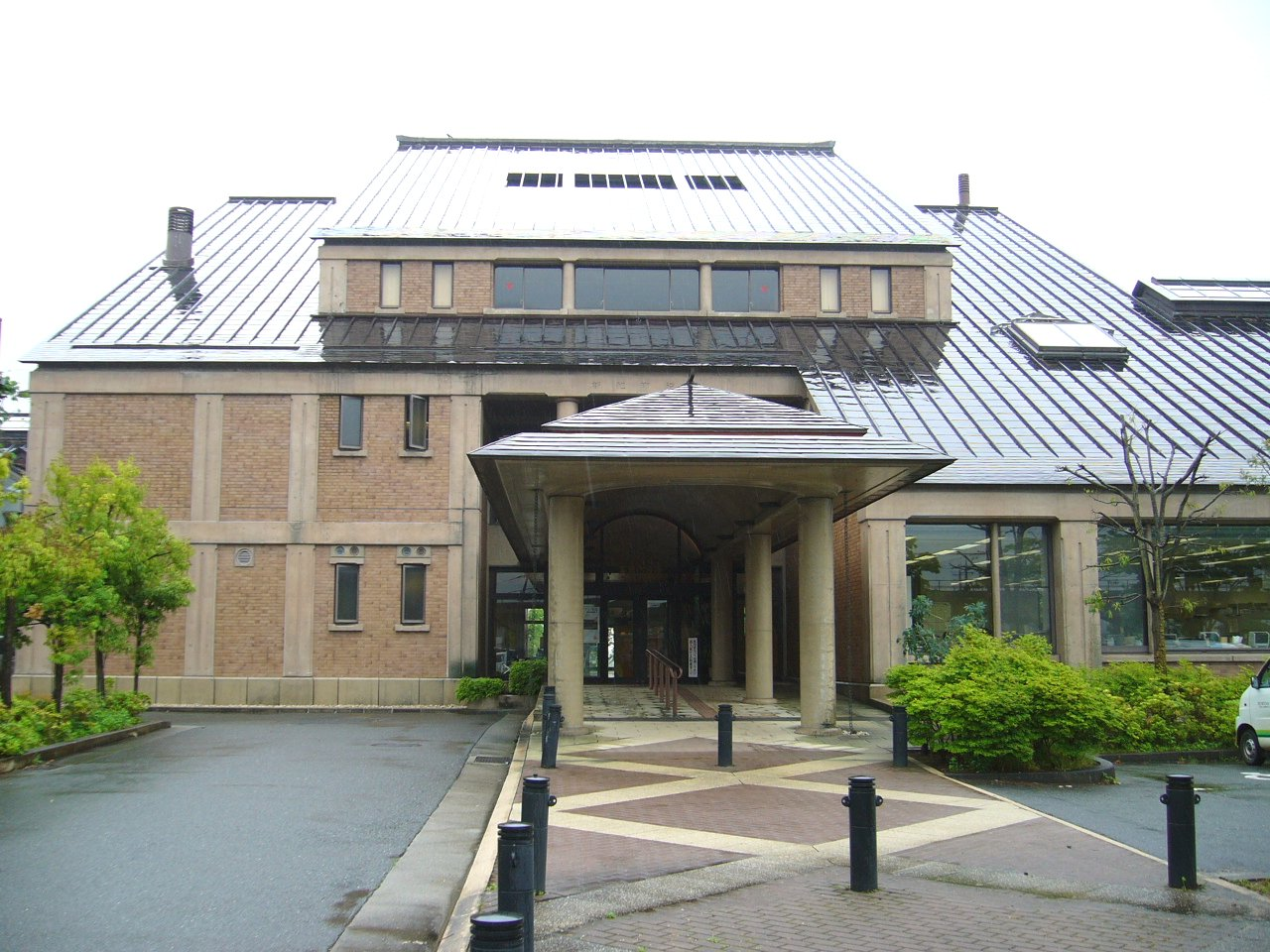
- Takashima City Hall

- Flag Seal

- Location of Takashima in Shiga Prefecture

- Location in Japan
- Coordinates: 35°21′N 136°2′E
- Country: Japan
- Region: Kansai
- Prefecture: Shiga

Area
  - Total: 693.05 km^{2} (267.59 sq mi)

Population (November 1, 2021)
  - Total: 46,976
  - Density: 67.782/km^{2} (175.55/sq mi)
- Time zone: UTC+09:00 (JST)
- City hall address: 565 Shin'asahichō Kitahata, Takashima-shi, Shiga-ken 520-1592
- Website: Official website

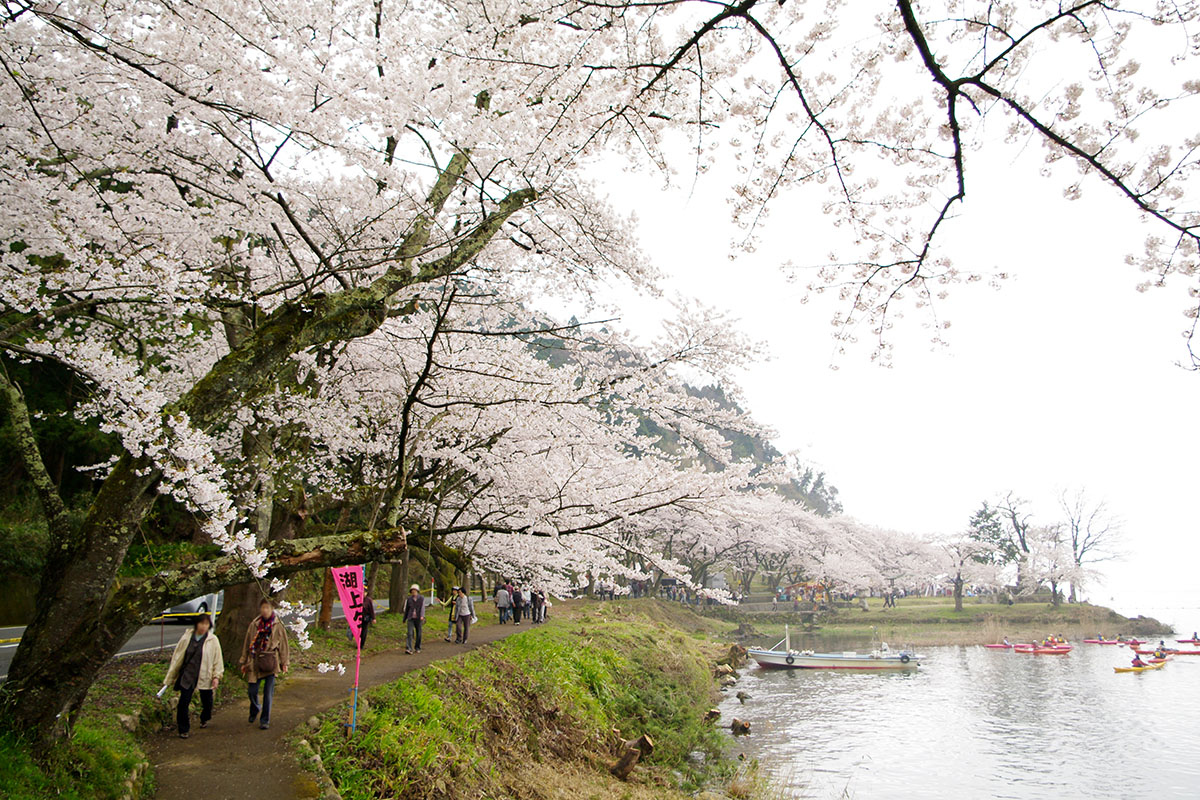
Kaizu-Osaki in the spring

Takashima (高島市, Takashima-shi; Japanese pronunciation: [tä̀.kä́.ɕì.mä̀, -ɕí.mä́.ɕì]) is a city located in Shiga Prefecture, Japan. As of 1 November 2021, the city had an estimated population of 46,976 in 20601 households and a population density of 68 persons per km^{2}. The total area of the city is 693.05 square kilometres (267.59 sq mi).

== Geography ==
Takashima is located on the western shore of Lake Biwa in the northwestern portion of Shiga Prefecture. The Adogawa and Ishida rivers form alluvial fans in the eastern part of the city on the shores of Lake Biwa, whereas the inland areas rise to the Nosaka and Hira Mountains. The former Makino town region of the city has the Kaizu Osaki, which has been selected as one of Japan's Top 100 Cherry Blossom Spots, and the area is also well known for its Asian fawn lily colonies. The inland areas of the city are noted for very heavy snow accumulation in winter.

=== Neighboring municipalities ===
- Fukui Prefecture
  - Mihama
  - Obama
  - Ōi
  - Tsuruga
  - Wakasa
- Kyoto Prefecture
  - Nantan
  - Sakyō-ku, Kyoto
- Shiga Prefecture
  - Nagahama
  - Ōtsu

=== Climate ===
Takashima has a humid subtropical climate (Köppen Cfa) characterized by warm summers and cool winters with light to no snowfall. The average annual temperature in Takashima is 13.5 °C. The average annual rainfall is 1801 mm with September as the wettest month. The temperatures are highest on average in August, at around 25.3 °C, and lowest in January, at around 2.3 °C.

Climate data for Imazu, Takashima
Month	Jan	Feb	Mar	Apr	May	Jun	Jul	Aug	Sep	Oct	Nov	Dec	Year
Mean daily maximum °C (°F)	6.0 (42.8)	6.5 (43.7)	10.4 (50.7)	16.7 (62.1)	21.4 (70.5)	24.9 (76.8)	28.6 (83.5)	30.5 (86.9)	26.7 (80.1)	20.9 (69.6)	14.8 (58.6)	9.2 (48.6)	18.1 (64.5)
Mean daily minimum °C (°F)	−0.7 (30.7)	−0.7 (30.7)	1.7 (35.1)	6.6 (43.9)	12.2 (54.0)	17.0 (62.6)	21.2 (70.2)	22.3 (72.1)	18.6 (65.5)	11.9 (53.4)	6.1 (43.0)	1.6 (34.9)	9.8 (49.7)
Average precipitation mm (inches)	171.1 (6.74)	137.9 (5.43)	136.7 (5.38)	125.0 (4.92)	164.3 (6.47)	199.2 (7.84)	208.6 (8.21)	118.6 (4.67)	180.7 (7.11)	124.3 (4.89)	112.3 (4.42)	148.3 (5.84)	1,827 (71.92)
Average snowfall cm (inches)	123 (48)	110 (43)	21 (8.3)	0 (0)	0 (0)	0 (0)	0 (0)	0 (0)	0 (0)	0 (0)	0 (0)	33 (13)	287 (112.3)
Average precipitation days (≥ 1.0 mm)	19.2	17.4	15.6	11.7	11.5	11.9	13.1	8.8	11.6	11.3	12.6	17.3	162
Mean monthly sunshine hours	75.8	81.5	120.9	171.0	175.5	143.0	150.1	189.3	146.7	142.5	112.3	91.1	1,599.7
Source: Japan Meteorological Agency

== Demographics ==
Per Japanese census data, the population of Takashima has remained relatively steady over the past 60 years.

Historical population
Year	Pop.	±%
1960	52,320	—
1970	49,818	−4.8%
1980	50,926	+2.2%
1990	52,032	+2.2%
2000	55,451	+6.6%
2010	52,491	−5.3%
2020	46,377	−11.6%

== History ==
Takashima is part of ancient Ōmi Province and has been settled since at least the Yayoi period. The Kofun period Emperor Keitai was born in what is now Takashima, and there are many burial tumuli within the city limits. The city is located on the shortest route between the Asuka and Nara period capitals of Japan and the Sea of Japan coastline and was thus an important thoroughfare for both domestic and international travel and commerce in the ancient period. It was also the site of a major battle of the Jinshin War. From the late Heian period and into the Kamakura period and beyond, the area came under then control of the powerful Sasaki clan and was ruled by a cadet branch of the clan, the Takashima clan, from their stronghold at Shimizuyama Castle. The clan was destroyed by Oda Nobunaga in the wars of the Sengoku period and after the establishment of the Tokugawa shogunate, much of the city area came under the control of the 20,000 koku Ōmizo Domain.

The village of Ōmizo was established within Takashima District, Shiga with the creation of the modern municipalities system on April 1, 1889. It was elevated to town status on November 1, 1902. After merging with neighboring Takashima and Mizuo villages on April 29, 1943, it was renamed the town of Takashima. On January 1, 2005, Takashima merged with the towns of Adogawa, Imazu, Makino and Shin'asahi, and the village of Kutsuki (all from Takashima District) to form the city of Takashima.

== Government ==
Takashima has a mayor-council form of government with a directly elected mayor and a unicameral city council of 18 members. Takashima contributes two members to the Shiga Prefectural Assembly. In terms of national politics, the city is part of Shiga 1st district of the lower house of the Diet of Japan.

== Economy ==
The economy of Takashima is centered on agriculture and light manufacturing.

== Education ==
Takashima has 13 public elementary schools and six public middle schools operated by the city government. There are two public high schools operated by the Shiga Prefectural Department of Education, and one private high school. The prefecture also operates one special education school for the handicapped.

== Transportation ==
=== Railway ===
JR West – Kosei Line

- Ōmi-Takashima - Adogawa - Shin-Asahi - Ōmi-Imazu - Ōmi-Nakashō - Makino

=== Highway ===
- Meishin Expressway
- National Route 161
- National Route 303
- National Route 367

== Sister cities ==
- Petoskey, Michigan, United States, since 1976

== Local attractions ==
- Shimizuyama Castle ruins, National Historic Site
- Tōju Shoin, National Historic Site

== Notable people ==
- Kakuzo Kawamoto, politician
- Yasuzo Shimizu, educator and Christian missionary
