= Ōmizo Domain =

Japanese historical domain in Omi province

Ōmizo Domain 大溝藩
- Domain of Japan
- 1619–1871
- Capital: Ōmizo jin'ya
- Area
  - Coordinates: 35°17′42″N 136°00′40″E
- Government
  - Type: Daimyō
- Historical era: Edo period
  - Established: 1619
  - Disestablished: 1871
- Today part of: part of Shiga Prefecture

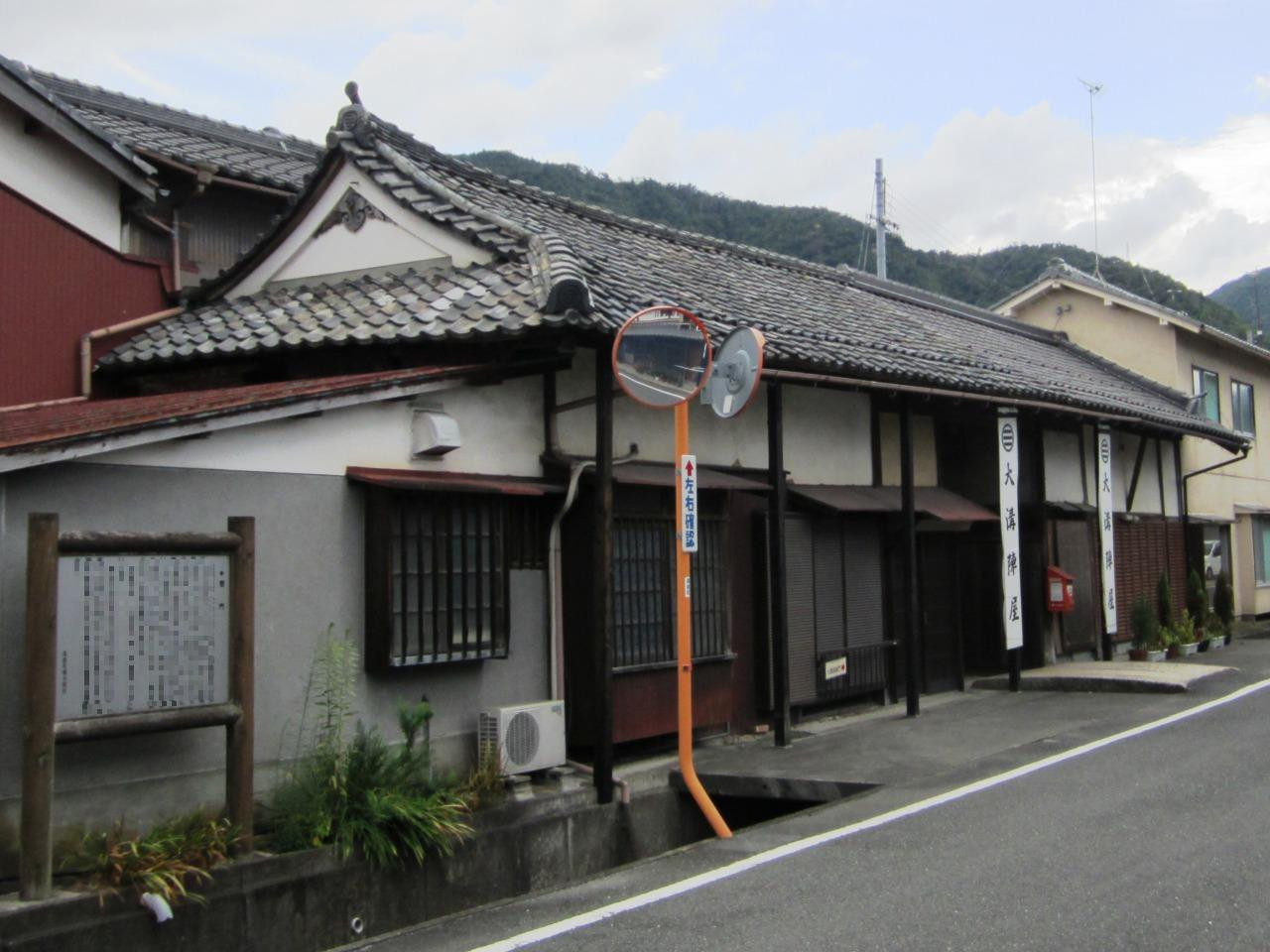
Gate of Ōmizo jin'ya

Ōmizo Domain (大溝藩, Ōmizo-han) was a tozama feudal domain under the Tokugawa shogunate of Edo period Japan. It was located in northwestern Ōmi Province, in the Kansai region of central Honshu. The domain was centered at Ōmizo jin'ya, located in what is now the city of Takashima in Shiga Prefecture.

== History ==
Ōmizo Castle was built by Tsuda Nobuzumi, a retainer of Akechi Mitsuhide around 1579. However, after the assassination of Nobunaga in 1582, he was executed as he was married to Akechi Mitsuhide's daughter and his territory was seized by Toyotomi Hideyoshi. Under Hideyoshi, the castle passed through a number of hands with rapidity, including Niwa Nagahide, Kato Mitsuyasu, Ikoma Chikamasa and Kyōgoku Takatsugu.

Ōmizo Domain was established by the Tokugawa shogunate when Wakebe Mitsunori was transferred from Iga-Ueno Domain and assigned a kokudaka of 20,0000 koku in 1619. The Wakebe were local gentry from Ise Province who had supported Tokugawa Ieyasu at the Battle of Sekigahara. As his status did not allow for a castle, the existing Ōmizo Castle was destroyed, leaving only the outer San-no-maru Bailey, upon which he constructed a jin'ya. He also laid out the surrounding jōkamachi and served the shogunate as a magistrate at Osaka Castle and at Mount Hiei. He was succeeded by his son, Wakebe Yoshiharu who, in 1658, killed his wife's uncle Ikeda Nagashige over a trivial argument, and succumbed to his own wounds the following day. His son, Wakebe Yoshitaka died at the age of 20 without heir. To avoid attainder, the clan turned to Ikeda Nobumasa, daimyō of Bitchu-Matsuyama Domain (who was a relative of Yoshitaka's mother) for an heir. They were sent his third son, who became Wakebe Nobumasa. However, the domain's finances were always in a precarious situation and due to frequent floods and crop failures, especially in 1669 and 1676, the domain often had to apply to the shogunate for assistance or exemption from its sankin kōtai obligation. The domain was often assigned then post of Osaka kaban, which was also a serious drain on its resources. Although the 8th daimyō, Wakebe Mitsuzane, attempted to implement a five-year plan of fiscal reforms, he was ultimately unsuccessful. During the Bakumatsu period, the 11th daimyō, Wakebe Mitsusada was assigned to the guard of Emperor Kōmei in Kyoto. The domain sided with the imperial cause in the Boshin War and he died in 1870, just before he could be appointed imperial governor of Ōmizo.

The final daimyō, Wakebe Mitsunori died on November 29, 1944, and was one of the last surviving daimyō (along with Hayashi Tadataka of Jōzai Domain and Asano Nagakoto of Hiroshima Domain). Wakebe Mitsunori outlined Hayashi and Asano; however, he succeeded to his title after the formal position of daimyō had been abolished, and his formal title was that of domain governor (藩知事) rather than daimyō. These circumstances lead historians to consider Hayashi Tadataka of the Jōzai Domain to have been last surviving daimyō.

Ōmizo was incorporated into Ōtsu prefecture, which subsequently became part of Shiga Prefecture.

== Bakumatsu period holdings ==
As with most domains in the han system, Ōmizo Domain consisted of a discontinuous territories calculated to provide the assigned kokudaka, based on periodic cadastral surveys and projected agricultural yields.

- Ōmi Province
  - 4 villages in Yasu District
  - 33 villages in Takashima District

== List of daimyō ==
- Wakebe clan (Tozama) 1619–1871

	Name	Tenure	Courtesy title	Court Rank	kokudaka
1	Wakebe Mitsunobu (分部光信)	1619–1643	Sakyō-no-suke (左京亮)	Junior 5th Rank, Lower Grade (従五位下)	20,000 koku
2	Wakebe Yoshiharu (分部嘉治)	1643–1658	Iga-no-kami (伊賀守)	Junior 5th Rank, Lower Grade (従五位下)	20,000 koku
3	Wakebe Yoshitaka (分部嘉高)	1658–1667	Wakasa-no-kami (若狭守)	Junior 5th Rank, Lower Grade (従五位下)	20,000 koku
4	Wakebe Nobumasa (分部信政)	1667–1714	Wakasa-no-kami (若狭守)	Junior 5th Rank, Lower Grade (従五位下)	20,000 koku
5	Wakebe Mitsutada (分部光忠)	1714–1731	Sakyō-no-suke (左京亮)	Junior 5th Rank, Lower Grade (従五位下)	20,000 koku
6	Wakebe Mitsunaga (分部光命)	1731–1754	Wakasa-no-kami (若狭守)	Junior 5th Rank, Lower Grade (従五位下)	20,000 koku
7	Wakebe Mitsutsune (分部光庸)	1754–1785	Wakasa-no-kami (若狭守)	Junior 5th Rank, Lower Grade (従五位下)	20,000 koku
8	Wakebe Mitsuzane (分部光賓)	1785–1808	Sakyō-no-suke (左京亮)	Junior 5th Rank, Lower Grade (従五位下)	20,000 koku
9	Wakebe Mitsukuni (分部光邦)	1808–1810	Wakasa-no-kami (若狭守)	Junior 5th Rank, Lower Grade (従五位下)	20,000 koku
10	Wakebe Mitsuyasu (分部光寧)	1810–1831	Sakyō-no-suke (左京亮)	Junior 5th Rank, Lower Grade (従五位下)	20,000 koku
11	Wakebe Mitsusada (分部光貞)	1831–1870	Wakasa-no-kami (若狭守)	Junior 5th Rank, Lower Grade (従五位下)	20,000 koku
11	Wakebe Mitsunori (分部光謙)	1870–1871	-none-	4th Rank (従四位)	20,000 koku

== See also ==
- List of Han
