= Adogawa Station =

Railway station in Takashima, Shiga Prefecture, Japan

Adogawa Station 安曇川駅
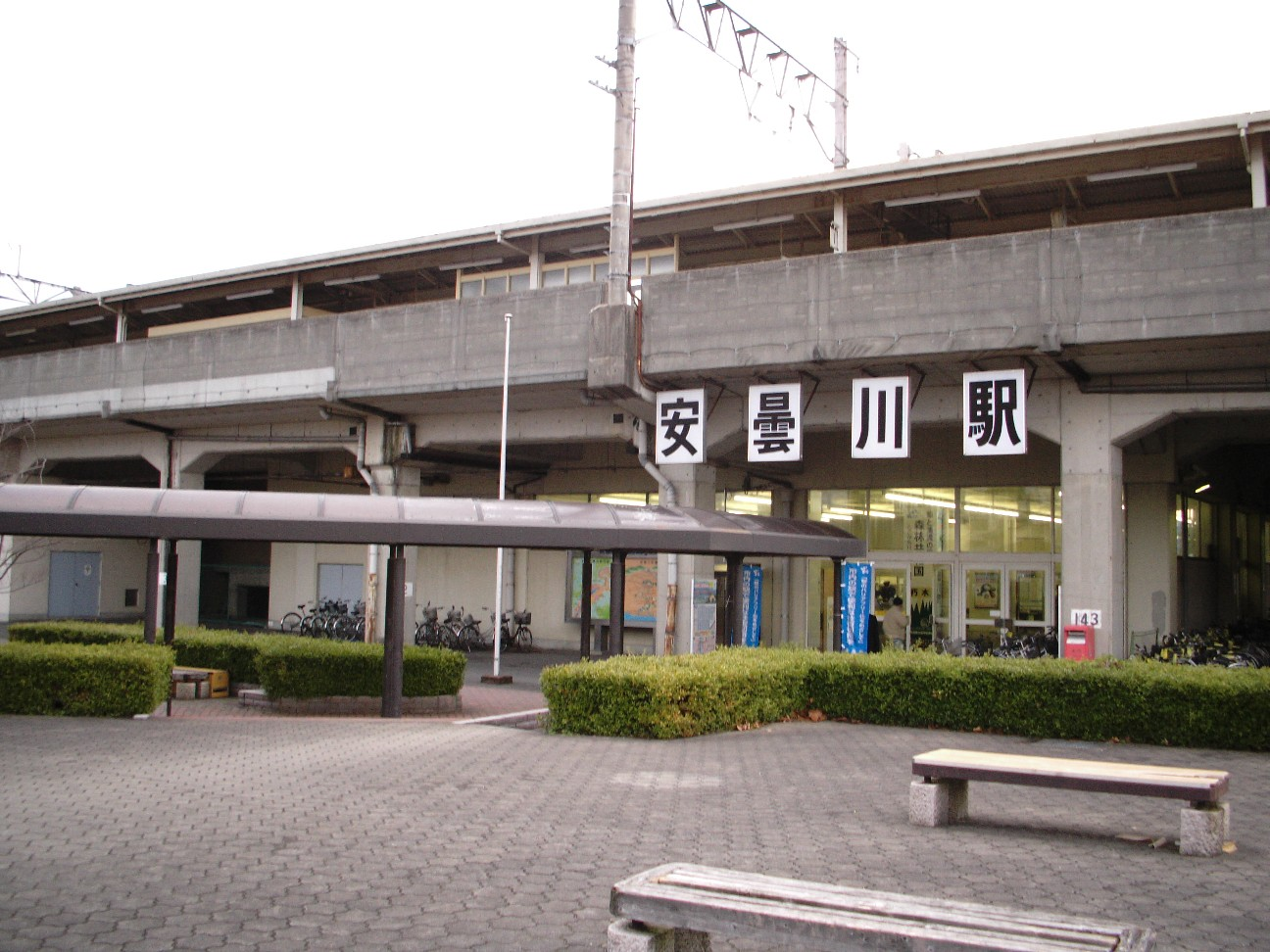
- Adogawa Station, March 2007

General information
- Location: Adogawacho Nishiyurugi 601, Takashima-shi, Shiga-ken 520-1212; Japan
- Coordinates: 35.3282°N 136.0200°E
- Operator: JR West
- Line: Kosei Line
- Distance: 45.0 km from Yamashina
- Platforms: 2 island platforms
- Tracks: 4
- Connections: Bus stop

Construction
- Structure type: Elevated
- Accessible: Yes

Other information
- Station code: JR-B16
- Website: Official website

History
- Opened: 20 July 1974

Passengers
- FY 2023: 2,800 daily

Services
Preceding station	JR West	Following station
Omi-Takashima towards Kyoto	Kosei Line Local Rapid Special Rapid	Shin-Asahi towards Tsuruga
Location
- Location within Shiga Prefecture Location within Japan

Adogawa Station (安曇川駅, Adogawa-eki) is a passenger railway station located in the city of Takashima, Shiga Prefecture, Japan, operated by the West Japan Railway Company (JR West).

== Lines ==
Adogawa Station is served by the Kosei Line, and is 45.0 kilometres (28.0 miles) from the starting point of the line at Yamashina and 50.5 kilometres (31.4 miles) from Kyoto.

== Station layout ==
The station consists of two opposed elevated island platforms with the station building underneath. The station is staffed.

== Platforms ==
1, 2	■ Kosei Line	for Ōmi-Imazu and Tsuruga
3, 4	■ Kosei Line	for Katata and Kyoto

== History ==
The station opened on 20 July 1974 as a station on the Japan National Railway (JNR). The station became part of the West Japan Railway Company on 1 April 1987 due to the privatization and dissolution of the JNR.

Station numbering was introduced in March 2018, and Adogawa was assigned station number JR-B16.

== Passenger statistics ==
In fiscal 2019, the station was used by an average of 1596 passengers daily (boarding passengers only).

== Surrounding area ==
- Shiga Prefectural Azumigawa High School
- Takashima City Office Adogawa Branch
- Takashima City Azumi Elementary School
- Takashima City Azumigawa Junior High School

== See also ==
- List of railway stations in Japan
