= Shin-Asahi Station =

Railway station in Takashima, Shiga Prefecture, Japan

Shin-Asahi Station 新旭駅
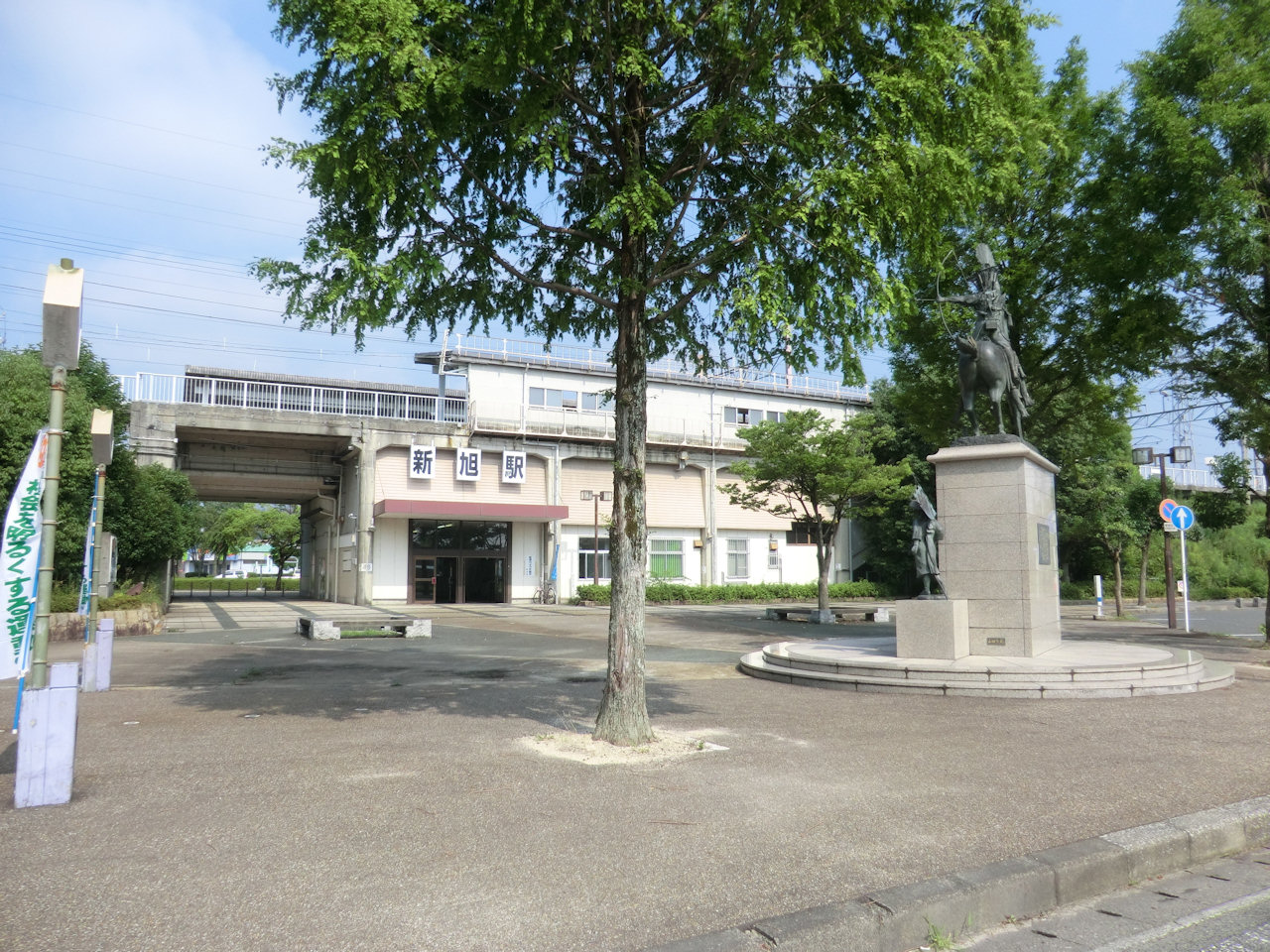
- Shin-Asahi Station, July 2012

General information
- Location: Shinasahi-cho Asahi 917-2, Takashima-shi, Shiga-ken 520-1501; Japan
- Coordinates: 35.3552°N 136.0349°E
- Operator: JR West
- Line: Kosei Line
- Distance: 48.3 km from Yamashina
- Platforms: 2 side platforms
- Tracks: 2
- Connections: Bus stop

Construction
- Structure type: Elevated
- Accessible: None

Other information
- Station code: JR-B15
- Website: Official website

History
- Opened: 20 July 1974

Passengers
- FY 2023: 2,082 daily

Services
Preceding station	JR West	Following station
Adogawa towards Kyoto	Kosei Line Local Rapid Special Rapid	Omi-Imazu towards Tsuruga
Location
- Location within Shiga Prefecture Location within Japan

Shin-Asahi Station (新旭駅, Shin-Asahi-eki) is a passenger railway station located in the city of Takashima, Shiga Prefecture, Japan, operated by the West Japan Railway Company (JR West).

== Lines ==
Shin-Asahi Station is served by the Kosei Line, and is 48.3 kilometres (30.0 miles) from the starting point of the line at Yamashina and 53.8 kilometres (33.4 miles) from Kyoto.

== Station layout ==
The station consists of two opposed elevated side platforms with the station building underneath. The station is staffed.

== Platforms ==
1	■ Kosei Line	for Ōmi-Imazu and Tsuruga
2	■ Kosei Line	for Katata and Kyoto

== History ==
The station opened on 20 July 1974 as a station on the Japan National Railway (JNR). The station became part of the West Japan Railway Company on 1 April 1987 due to the privatization and dissolution of the JNR.

Station numbering was introduced in March 2018 with Shin-Asahi being assigned station number JR-B15.

== Passenger statistics ==
In fiscal 2019, the station was used by an average of 1129 passengers daily (boarding passengers only).

== Surrounding area ==
- Takashima City Hall (former Shin-Asahi Town Hall)
- Shin-Asahi Public Hall
- Takashima City Kosai Junior High School
- Shin-Asahi Comprehensive Sports Park

== See also ==
- List of railway stations in Japan
