= Takashima District, Shiga =

Former district in Shiga prefecture, Japan

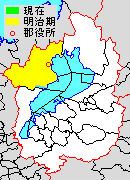
Map of Takashima District with Meiji period (1890) area in yellow.

Takashima (高島郡, Takashima-gun) was a district located in Shiga Prefecture, Japan.

As of 2003, the district had an estimated population of 55,348 and a density of 108.24 persons per km^{2}. The total area was 511.36 km^{2}.

On January 1, 2005, the former town of Takashima absorbed the towns of Adogawa, Imazu, Makino and Shin'asahi, and the village of Kutsuki to create the city of Takashima. Therefore, Takashima District was converted into a city.

== Former towns and village ==
- Adogawa (town)
- Imazu (town)
- Kutsuki (village)
- Makino (town)
- Shin'asahi (town)
- Takashima (town)
